= Murano Station =

Railway station in Hiraakata, Osaka Prefecture, Japan

Murano Station 村野駅
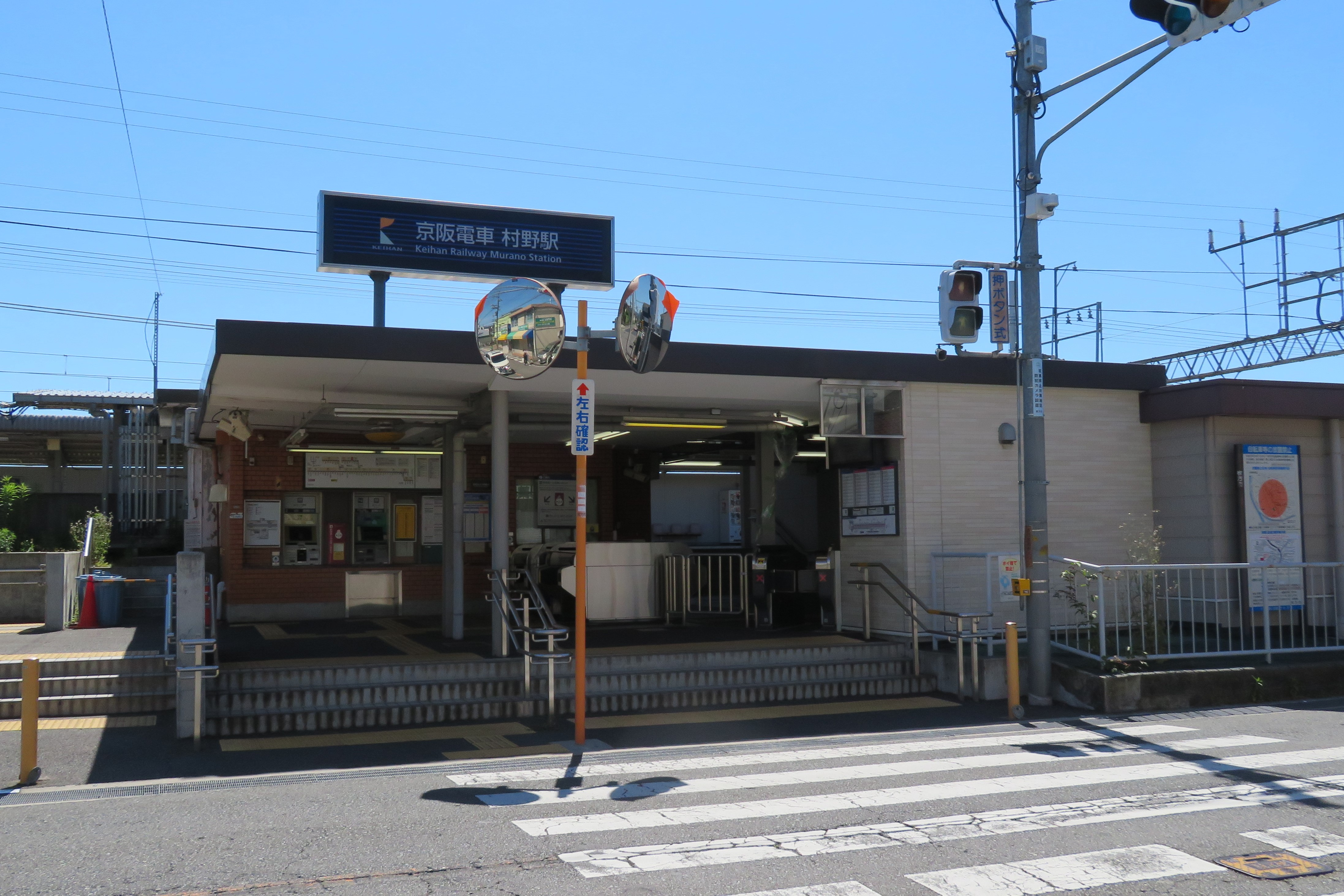
- Murano Station

General information
- Location: 1-25 Murano Hommachi, Hirakata-shi, Osaka-fu 573-0016; Japan
- Coordinates: 34°48′06″N 135°39′51″E
- Operator: Keihan Electric Railway
- Line: Katano Line
- Distance: 2.5 km from Hirakatashi
- Platforms: 2 side platforms
- Connections: Bus stop

Other information
- Station code: KH63
- Website: Official website

History
- Opened: 10 July 1929

Passengers
- FY2019: 4,840 daily

Services
Preceding station	Keihan Electric Railway	Following station
Hoshigaoka towards Hirakatashi	Katano Line	Kōzu towards Kisaichi
Location
- Location within Osaka Prefecture Location within Japan

Murano Station (村野駅, Murano-eki) is a passenger railway station in located in the city of Hirakata, Osaka Prefecture, Japan, operated by the private railway company Keihan Electric Railway.

== Lines ==
Murano Station is a station of the Keihan Katano Line, and is located 2.5 kilometers from the terminus of the line at Hirakatashi Station.

== Station layout ==
The station has two ground-level opposed side platforms connected by an elevated station building.

=== Platforms ===
1	■ Keihan Katano Line	for Hirakatashi, Yodoyabashi, and Demachiyanagi
2	■ Keihan Katano Line	for Katanoshi and Kisaichi

== History ==
The station was opened on July 10, 1929.

== Passenger statistics ==
In fiscal 2019, the station was used by an average of 4,840 passengers daily.

== Surrounding area ==
- Murano Public Housing
- Murano Shrine
- Murano Water Purification Plant
- Osaka Prefectural Hirakata Support School

== See also ==
- List of railway stations in Japan
