= Hoshigaoka Station (Osaka) =

Railway station in Hiraakata, Osaka Prefecture, Japan

Hoshigaoka Station 星ヶ丘駅
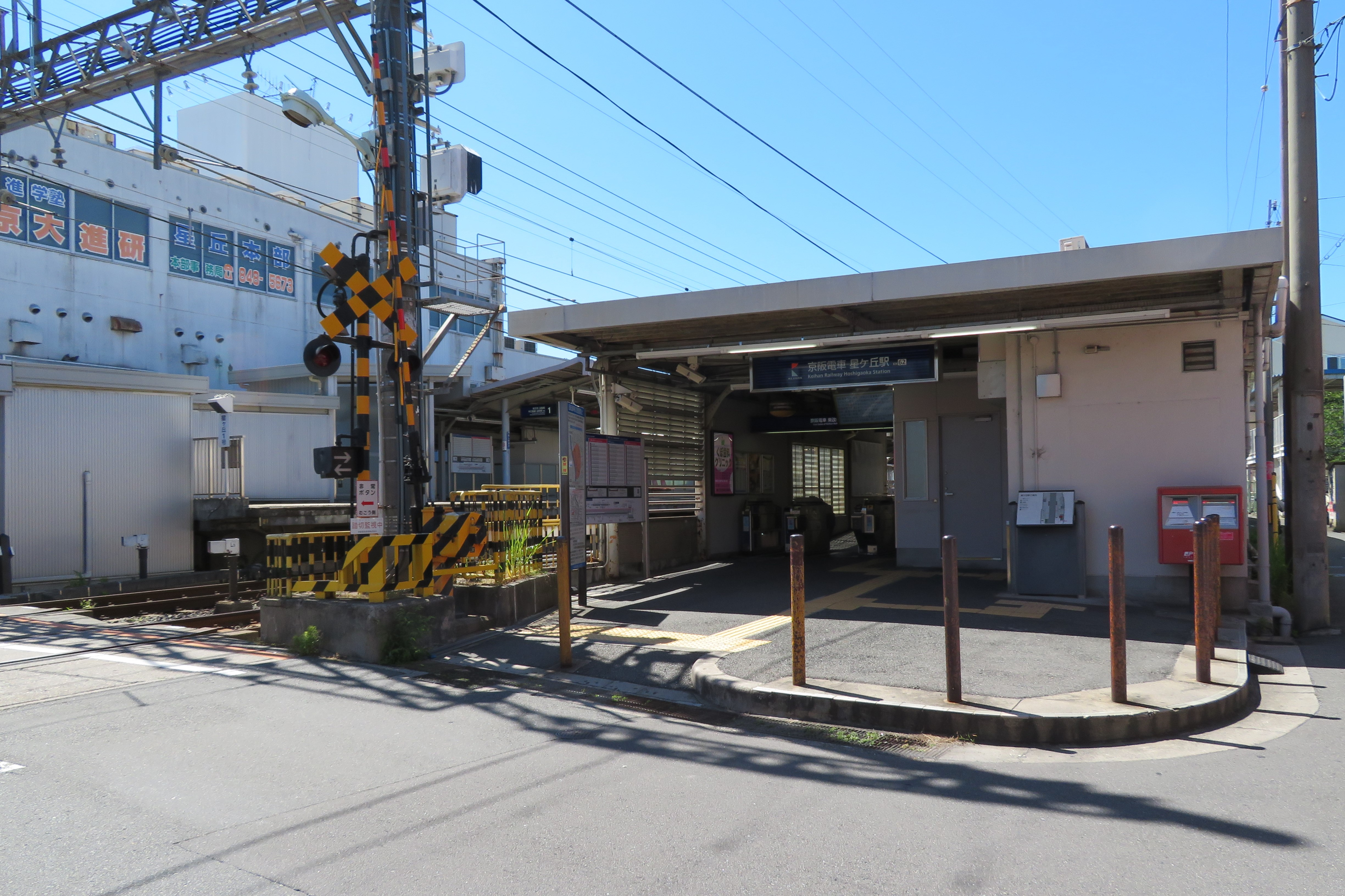
- Hoshigaoka Station

General information
- Location: 1-1 Hoshigaoka 2-chōme, Hirakata-shi, Osaka-fu 573-0013; Japan
- Coordinates: 34°48′27″N 135°39′35″E
- Operator: Keihan Electric Railway
- Line: Katano Line
- Distance: 1.7 km from Hirakatashi
- Platforms: 2 side platforms
- Connections: Bus stop

Other information
- Station code: KH62
- Website: Official website

History
- Opened: 1 November 1938

Passengers
- FY2019: 4,885 daily

Services
Preceding station	Keihan Electric Railway	Following station
Miyanosaka towards Hirakatashi	Katano Line	Murano towards Kisaichi
Location
- Location within Osaka Prefecture Location within Japan

Hoshigaoka Station (星ヶ丘駅, Hoshigaoka-eki) is a passenger railway station in the city of Hirakata, Osaka Prefecture, Japan, operated by the private railway company Keihan Electric Railway.

== Lines ==
Hoshigaoka Station is a station of the Keihan Katano Line and is located 1.7 kilometres (1.1 mi) from the terminus of the line at Hirakatashi Station.

== Station layout ==
The station has two ground-level opposed side platforms connected by an elevated station building.

=== Platforms ===
1	■ Keihan Katano Line	for Hirakatashi, Yodoyabashi, and Demachiyanagi
2	■ Keihan Katano Line	for Katanoshi and Kisaichi

== History ==
The station was opened on November 1, 1938.

== Passenger statistics ==
In the 2009 fiscal year, the station was used by an average of 4,885 passengers daily.

== Surrounding area ==
- Amano River
- Hirakata Hoshigaoka Post Office

== See also ==
- List of railway stations in Japan
