= Kōzu Station (Osaka) =

Railway station in Katano, Osaka Prefecture, Japan

Kōzu Station 郡津駅
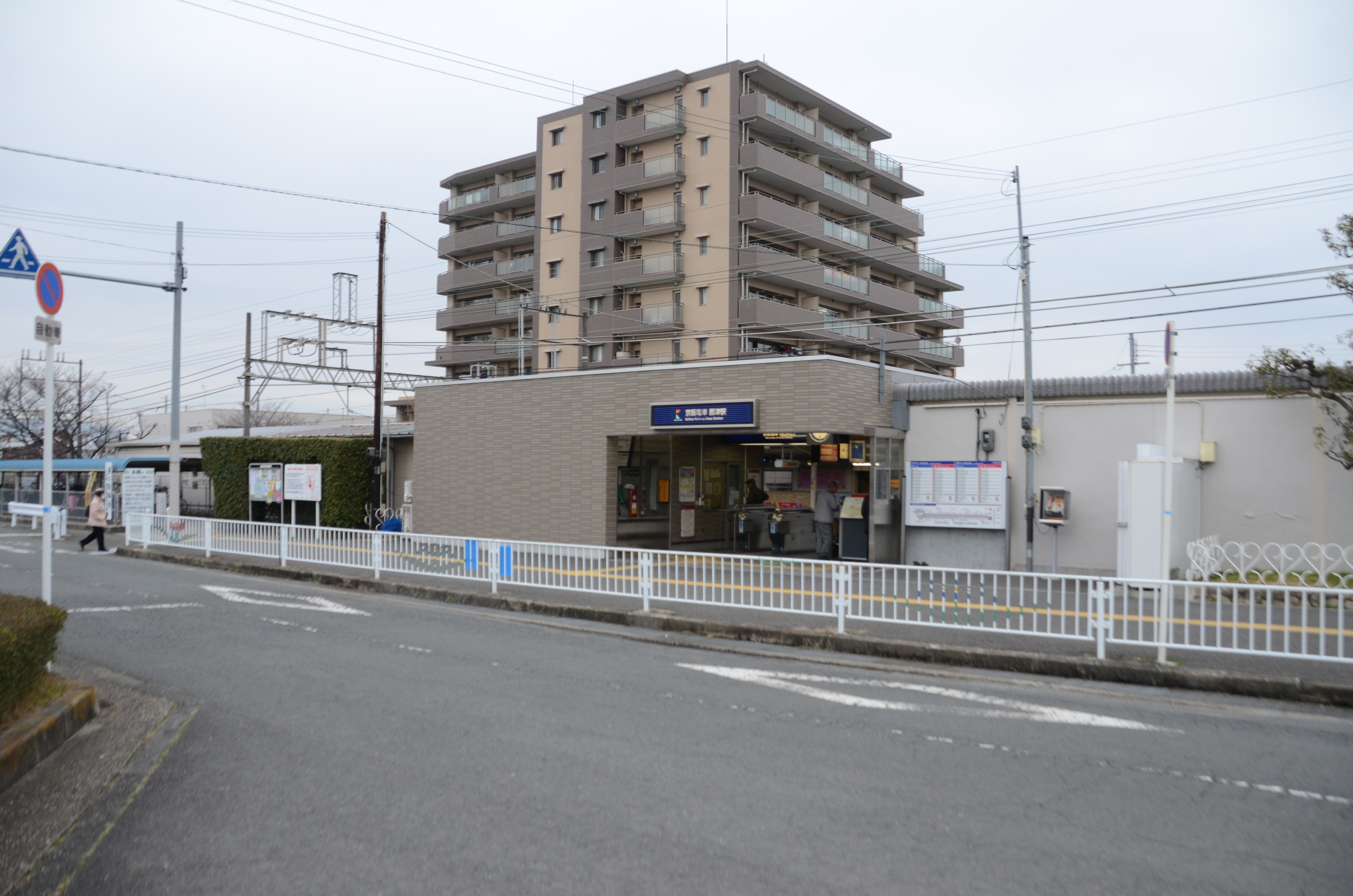
- Kōzu Station, March 2015

General information
- Location: 14 Matsuzuka, Katano-shi, Osaka-fu 576-0043; Japan
- Coordinates: 34°47′39″N 135°40′12″E
- Operator: Keihan Electric Railway
- Line: Katano Line
- Distance: 3.4 km from Hirakatashi
- Platforms: 2 side platforms
- Connections: Bus stop

Other information
- Station code: KH64
- Website: Official website

History
- Opened: 10 July 1929

Passengers
- FY2019: 6,768 daily

Services
Preceding station	Keihan Electric Railway	Following station
Murano towards Hirakatashi	Katano Line	Katanoshi towards Kisaichi
Location
- Location within Osaka Prefecture Location within Japan

Kōzu Station (郡津駅, Kōzu-eki) is a passenger railway station in located in the city of Katano, Osaka Prefecture, Japan, operated by the private railway company Keihan Electric Railway.

== Lines ==
Kōzu Station is a station of the Keihan Katano Line, and is located 3.4 kilometers from the terminus of the line at Hirakatashi Station.

== Station layout ==
The station has two ground-level opposed side platforms connected by an underground passage.

=== Platforms ===
1	■ Keihan Katano Line	for Hirakatashi, Yodoyabashi, and Demachiyanagi
2	■ Keihan Katano Line	for Kisaichi

== History ==
The station was opened on July 10, 1929.

== Passenger statistics ==
In fiscal 2019, the station was used by an average of 6,768 passengers daily.

== Surrounding area ==
- Maruyama Kofun
- Kozu Shrine
- Matsuzuka Park
- Kozu Ekimae Post Office
- Katano City Kozu Elementary School

== See also ==
- List of railway stations in Japan
