= Kinyakurumazuka Kofun =

- 禁野車塚古墳 (Japanese)
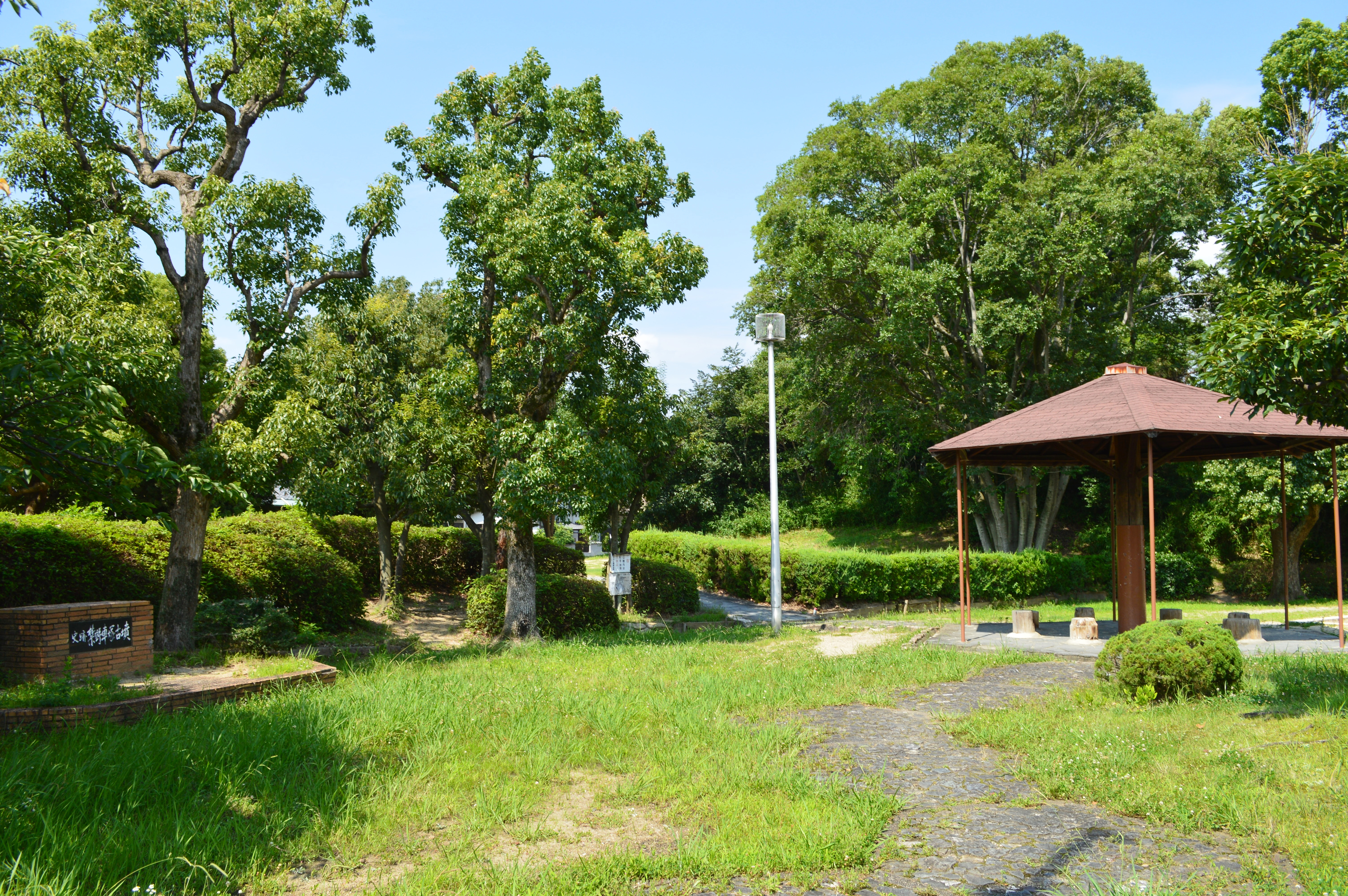
- Kinyakurumazuka Kofun

- Kinyakurumazuka Kofun Kinyakurumazuka Kofun (Japan)
- Interactive map of Kinyakurumazuka Kofun
- 34°48′39.23″N 135°39′25″E
- Type: Kofun
- Periods: Kofun period
- Location: Hirakata, Osaka, Japan
- Region: Kansai region

History
- Built: c.late 4th century

Site notes
- Public access: Yes (Park)

The Kinyakurumazuka Kofun (禁野車塚古墳) is a Kofun period keyhole-shaped burial mound, located in the Miyanosaka neighborhood of the city of Hirakata, Osaka in the Kansai region of Japan. The tumulus was designated a National Historic Site of Japan in 1972 with the area under protection expanded in 2007.

== Overview ==
The Kinyakurumazuka Kofun is a zenpō-kōen-fun (前方後円墳), which is shaped like a keyhole, having one square end and one circular end, when viewed from above. It is located in a residential area between the rivers of the Hirakata hills extending to the northwestern foot of the Ikoma Mountains on the bank of the Amano River near its confluence with the Yodo River. It is one of the few ancient burial mounds that remain on the south bank of the Yodo River basin, and since the Yodo River was one of the main transportation routes from Seto Inland Sea to the center of the Kinai region, it is regarded to be of great significance to understanding the Kofun period history of the area. The tumulus has a length of 120 meters and is orientated to the west. The anterior portion is low and has a "drumstick" shape, whereas the posterior circular portion is high. There is no moat, but fukiishi have been found on the lower south side of the posterior circular portion and both cylindrical haniwa and figurative haniwa have been found. The tumulus has been extensively surveyed, but no archaeological excavation has yet been conducted, so details of its burial chamber are uncertain. It is presumed to be a vertical pit-type stone chamber based on piece of stone slab at the top of the posterior circle. Based on the shape and construction technique and style of haniwa, the tumulus is believed to date from the early Kofun period, or around the 4th century.

The tumulus is located about a five-minute walk from Miyanosaka Station on the Keihan Katano Line.

Total length
120 meters:
Anterior rectangular portion
55 meters wide, 2-tier
Posterior circular portion
63 meter diameter, 2-tiers

== Gallery ==
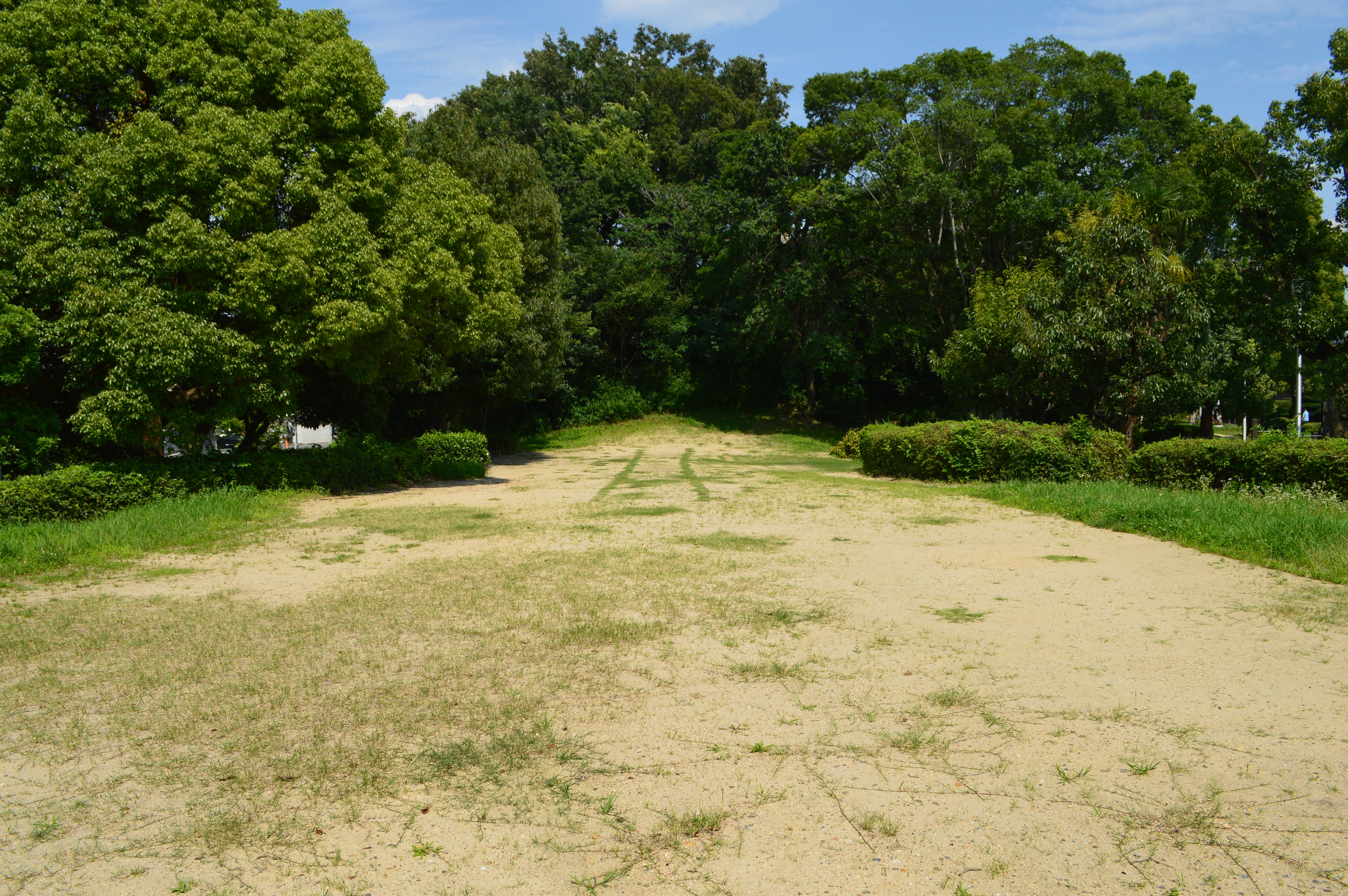
Anterior looking towards posterior

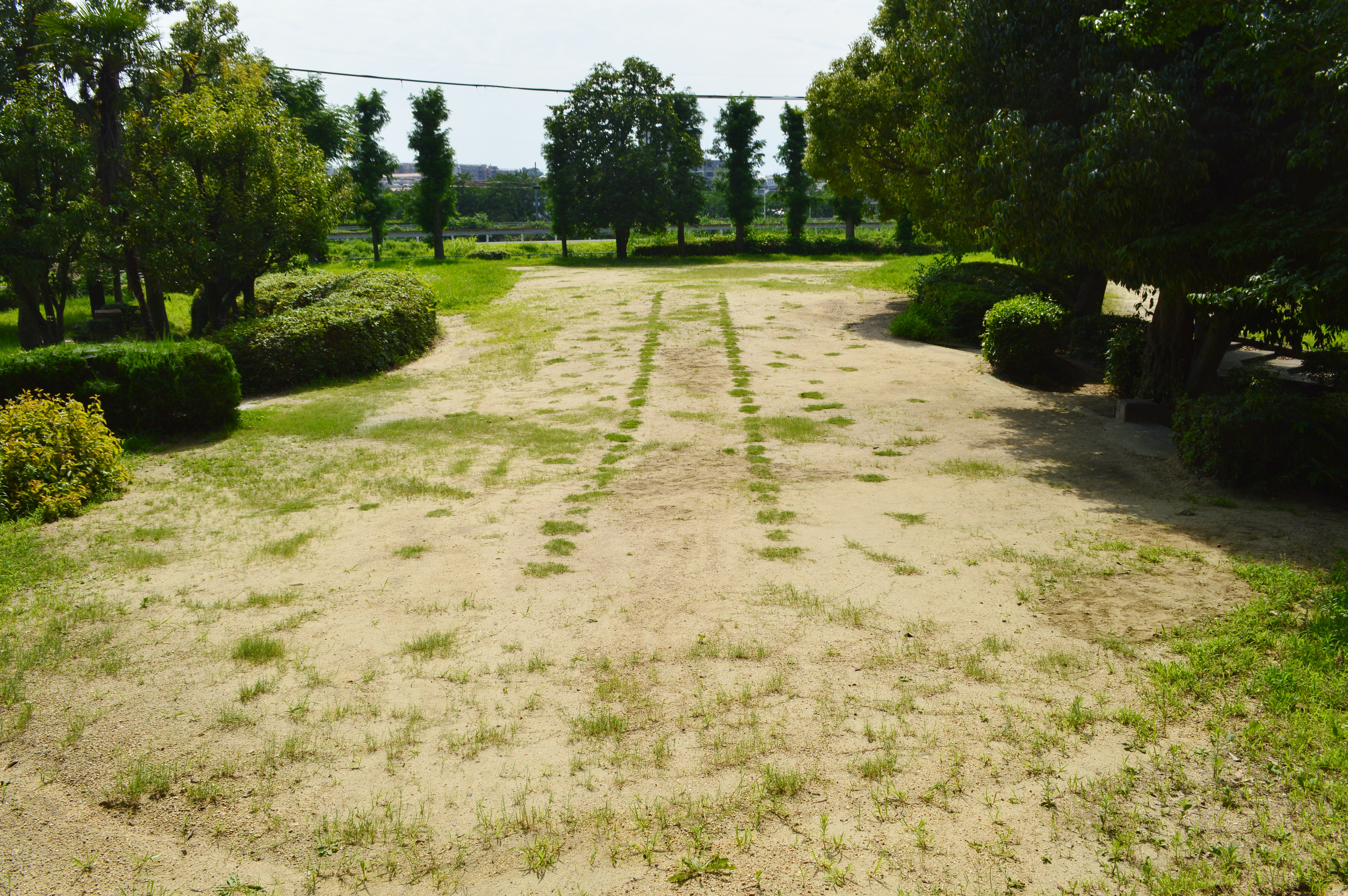
Posterior looking towards anterior

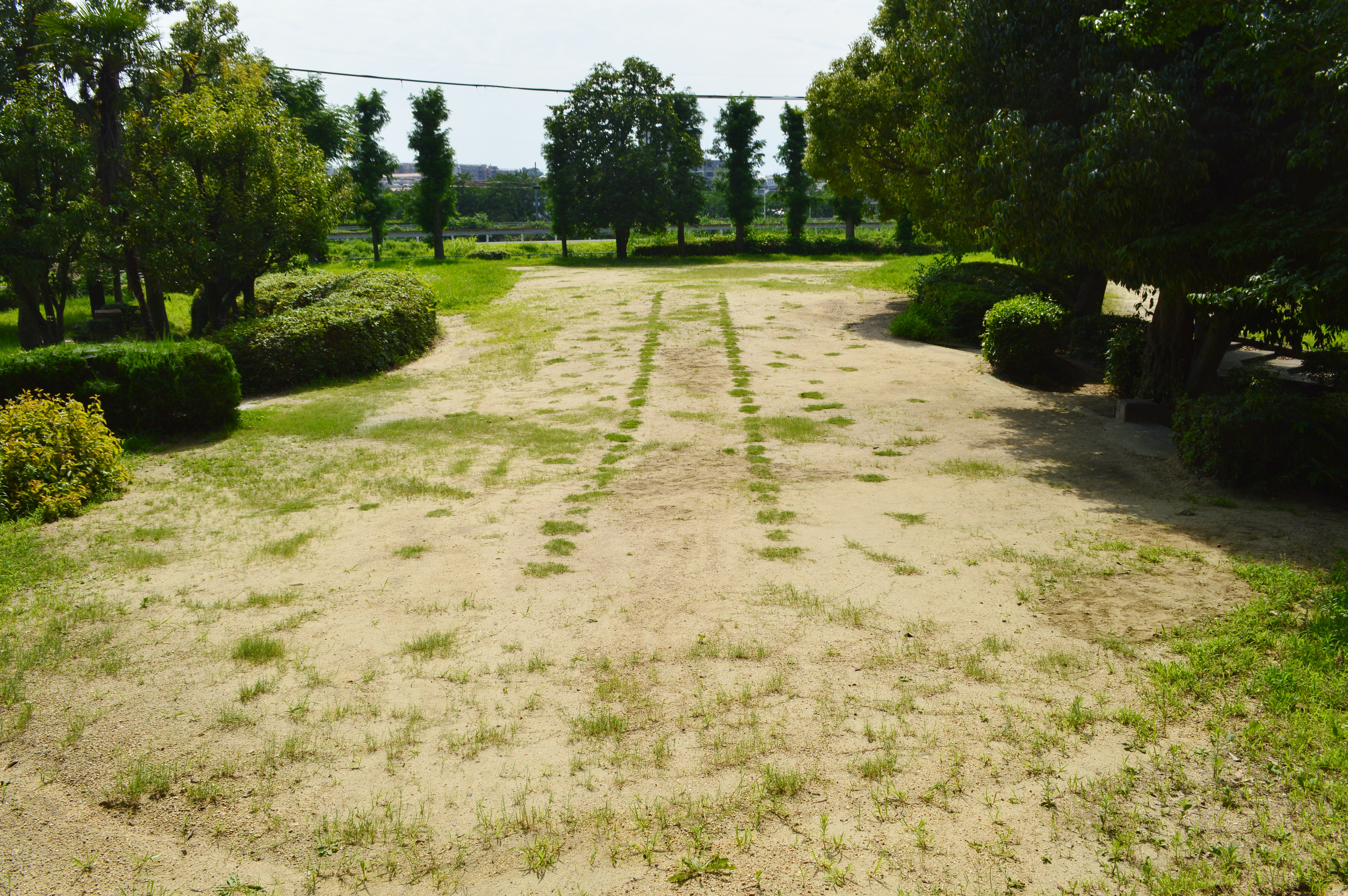
Top of the tumulus

== See also ==
- List of Historic Sites of Japan (Osaka)
