= Miyanosaka Station =

Miyanosaka Station is the name of multiple railway stations in Japan:

- Miyanosaka Station (Osaka) (宮之阪駅)
- Miyanosaka Station (Tokyo) (宮の坂駅)
