= Kawachimori Station =

Railway station in Katano, Osaka Prefecture, Japan

Kawachi-mori Station 河内森駅
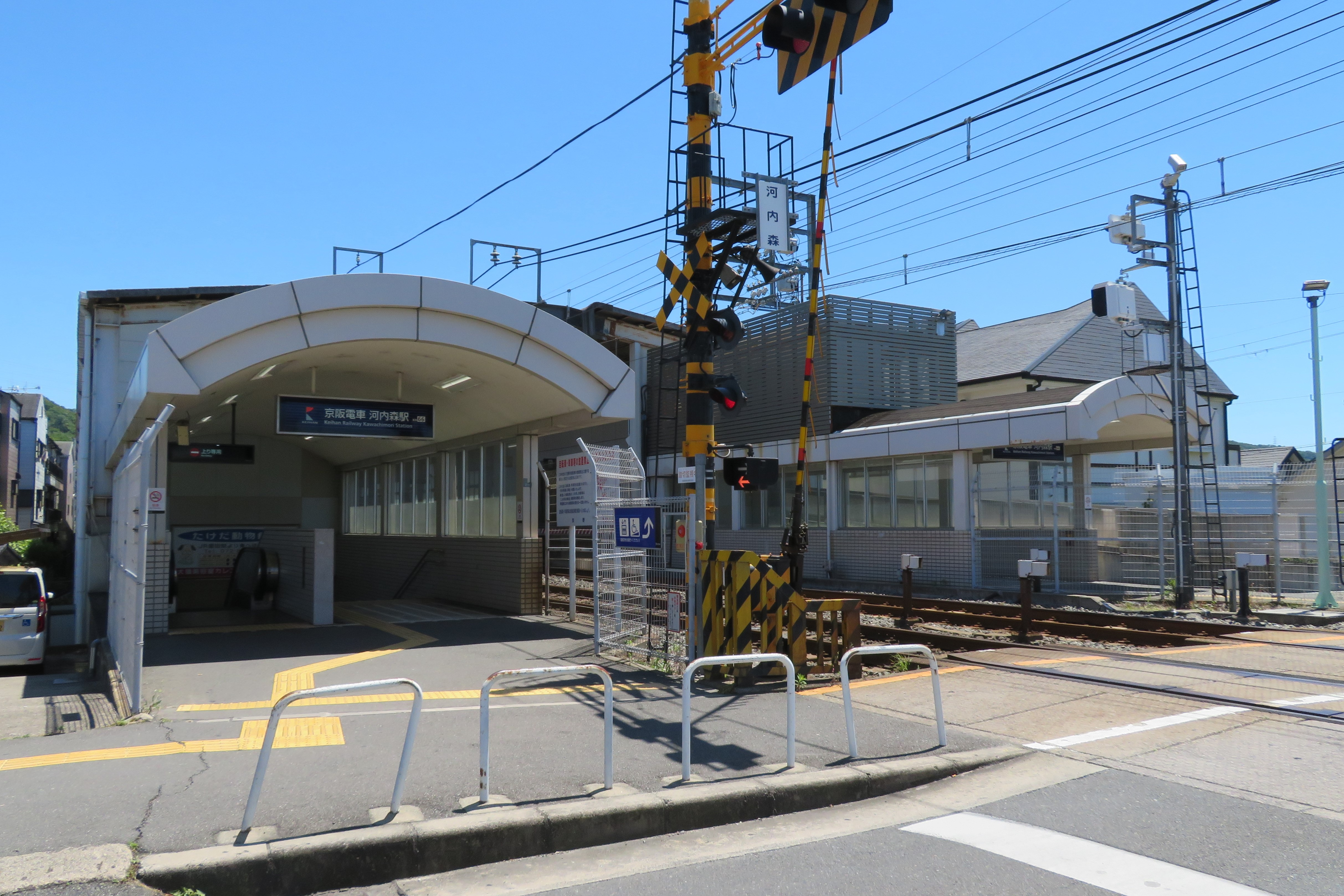
- Kawachi-mori Station

General information
- Location: 2-1 Kisaichi 1-chōme, Katano-shi, Osaka-fu 576-0033; Japan
- Coordinates: 34°46′26″N 135°41′08″E
- Operator: Keihan Electric Railway
- Line: Katano Line
- Distance: 6.1 km from Hirakatashi
- Platforms: 2 side platforms
- Connections: Bus stop

Other information
- Station code: KH66
- Website: Official website

History
- Opened: 21 October 1930

Passengers
- FY2019: 11,320 daily

Services
Preceding station	Keihan Electric Railway	Following station
Katanoshi towards Hirakatashi	Katano Line	Kisaichi Terminus
Location
- Location within Osaka Prefecture Location within Japan

Kawachi-mori Station (河内森駅, Kawachimori-eki) is a passenger railway station in located in the city of Katano, Osaka Prefecture, Japan, operated by the private railway company Keihan Electric Railway.

== Lines ==
Kawachi-mori Station is a station of the Keihan Katano Line, and is located 6.1 kilometers from the terminus of the line at Hirakatashi Station.

== Station layout ==
The station has two ground-level opposed side platforms connected by an underground passage.

=== Platforms ===
1	■ Keihan Katano Line	for Hirakatashi, Yodoyabashi, and Demachiyanagi
2	■ Keihan Katano Line	for Kisaichi

== History ==
The station was opened on October 21, 1930.

== Passenger statistics ==
In fiscal 2019, the station was used by an average of 11,320 passengers daily.

== Surrounding area ==
The area around the station is a residential area.

- National Route 168
- Second Keihan Highway

== See also ==
- List of railway stations in Japan
