= Kudara-dera =

Ruined Buddhist temple in Hirakata, Osaka, Japan

Kudara-ji
- 百済寺
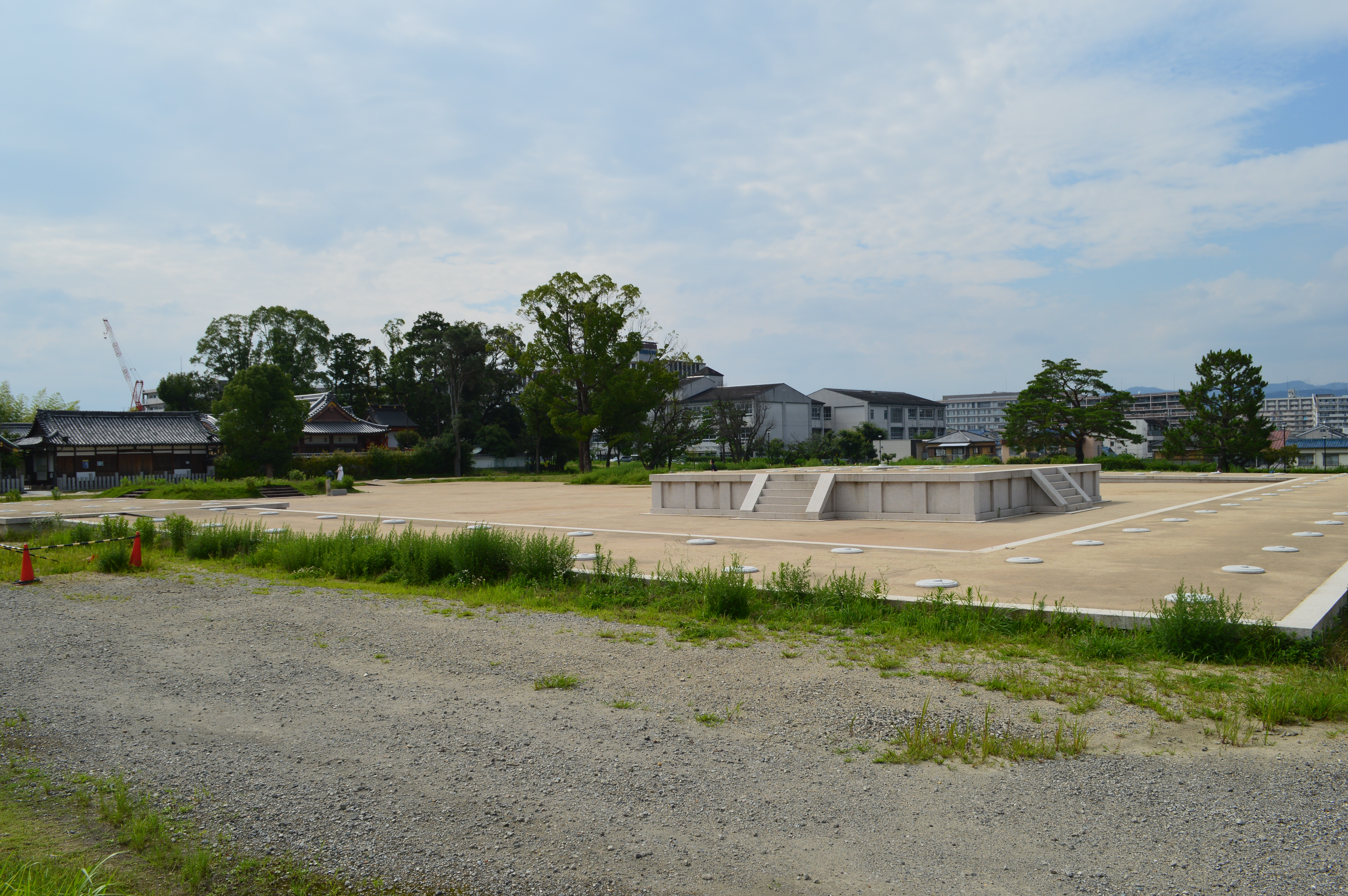
- Kudara-ji ruins

- Location within Osaka Prefecture Location within Japan

Religion
- Affiliation: Buddhist
- Status: ruins

Location
- Location: Nakamiya Nishinocho, Hirakata-shi, Osaka-fu
- Country: Japan
- Interactive map of Kudara-ji
- Coordinates: 34°48′56″N 135°39′40″E

Architecture
- Founder: Kudara-no-konishiki Kyōfuku
- Completed: 750 AD

Kudara-ji (百済寺) was a Buddhist temple located in the city of Hirakata, Osaka, Japan. The temple is now in ruins, and its former precincts were designated a National Historic Site in 1941, with the designation changed to a Special National Historic Site in 1952. The site was opened to the public as one of Japan's first archaeological parks in 1965.

== History ==
Kudara-ji was founded by Kudara-no-konishiki Kyōfuku in 750 AD. In 660 AD, the kingdom of Baekje in the Korean Peninsula was conquered by the Silla–Tang alliance, and its final king, Uija of Baekje was taken to China as a prisoner. However, his son Buyeo Pung escaped to Japan, and together with Yamato general Abe no Hirafu unsuccessfully attempted to restore the kingdom. Another son, named Zenkō (善光 or 禅広), settled in Japan and was given the family name Kudara no Konikishi (百濟王; "king of Baekje") by the emperor of Japan. The Kudara-no-Konishiki clan initially enjoyed privileged treatment but were assimilated into the Japanese aristocracy in 691. Kudara-no-Konishiki Kyōfuku was the great-grandson of Zenkō and in his role as nominal governor of Mutsu Province found a large deposit of gold which was donated to the Court for use in the completion of the Daibutsu at Tōdai-ji in Nara. Kudara-ji (whose kanji is the same as "Baekje") was constructed shortly after this event.

The temple was destroyed by fire around the 11th and 12th centuries, roughly around the time the Kudara-no-Konishiki clan vanishes from the political landscape and was never rebuilt.

The site was excavated first in 1932, and based on the foundation stones uncovered, it was determined that the temple has a "Yakushi-ji"-style layout, consisting of a South Gate, Middle Gate, pair of pagodas side-by-side, a Main Hall and a Lecture Hall contained within an area approximately 200 meters on each side. It received protection as a National Historic Site in 1941 based on this discovery; however, the site subsequently became very overgrown with tree roots damaging the foundations. A second excavation was made in 1965, which discovered at a cloister connected the Main Hall to the Middle Gate, making the layout closer to that of the Kanon-ji temple ruins in Silla rather than Yakushi-ji. A third excavation was undertaken in 2005 to repair damaged and to make up for gaps in the second survey. During this excavation, fragments of a large bas-relief-shaped Buddha statue were discovered.

The temple ruins are about a 10-minute walk from Miyanosaka Station on the Keihan Electric Railway Katano Line. The Kudaraō Jinja, a Shinto Shrine dedicated to the Kudara no Konikishi clan is located adjacent to the site.

== Gallery ==
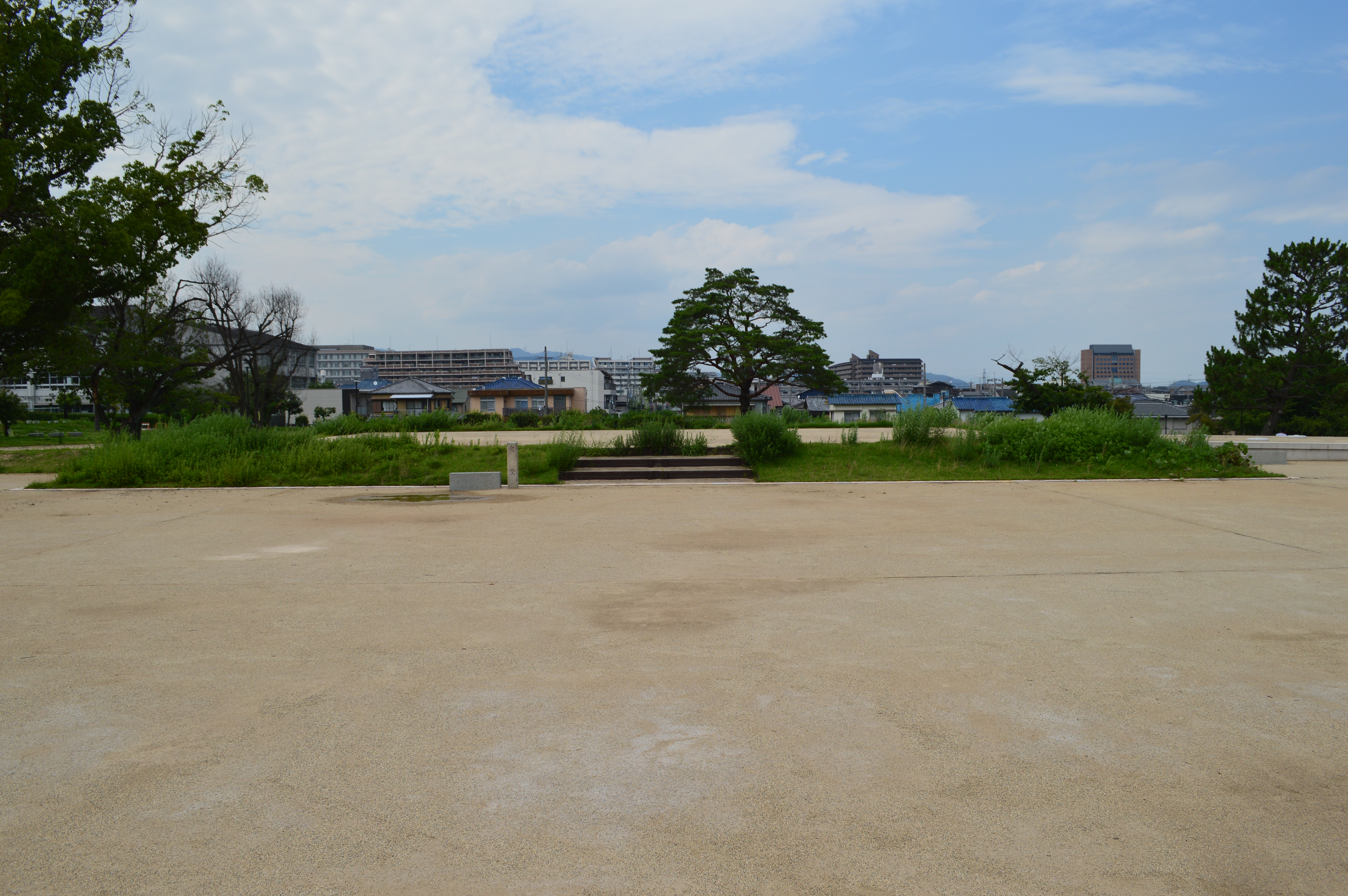
Site of the Main Hall

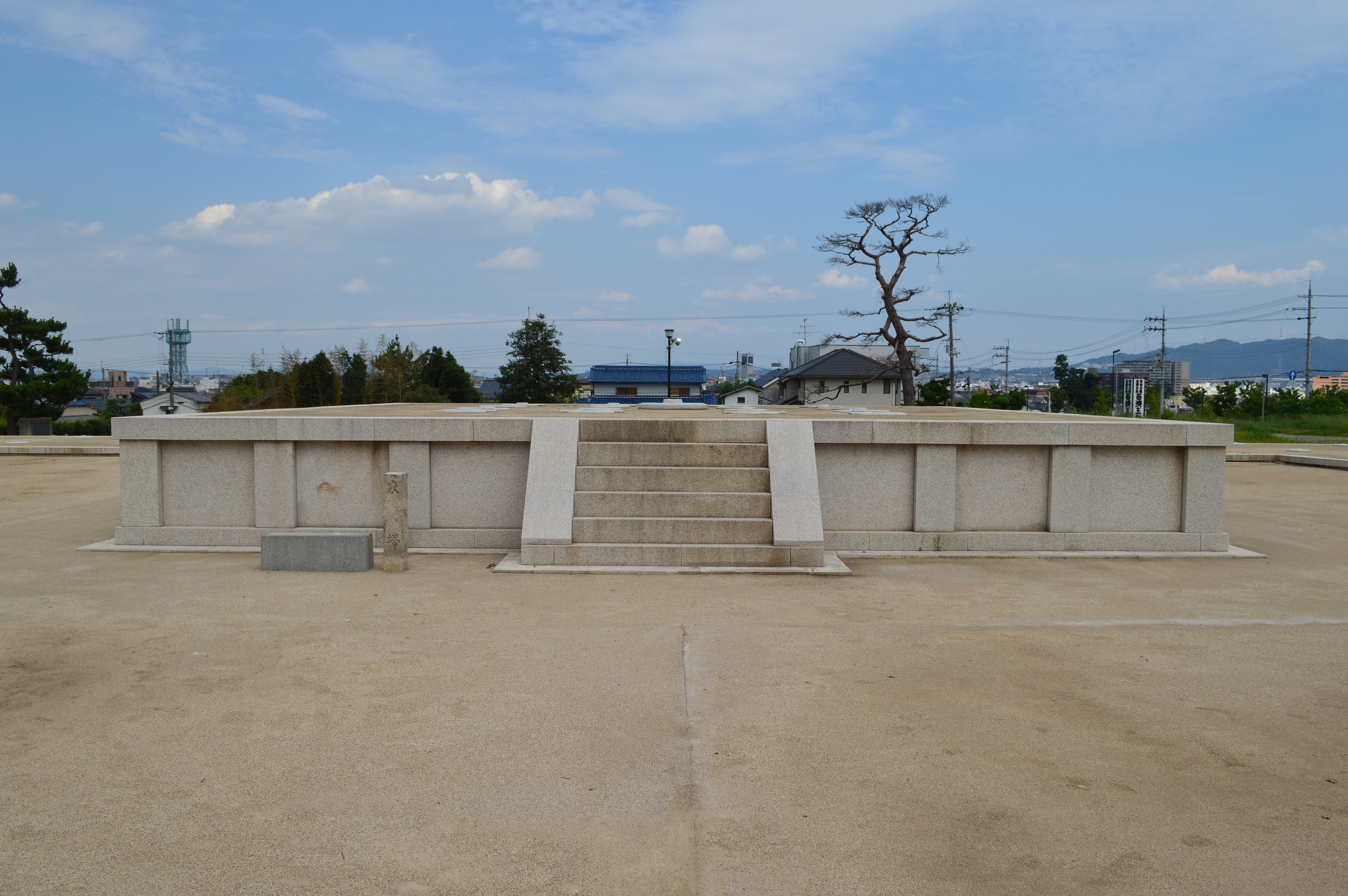
Site of the East Pagoda

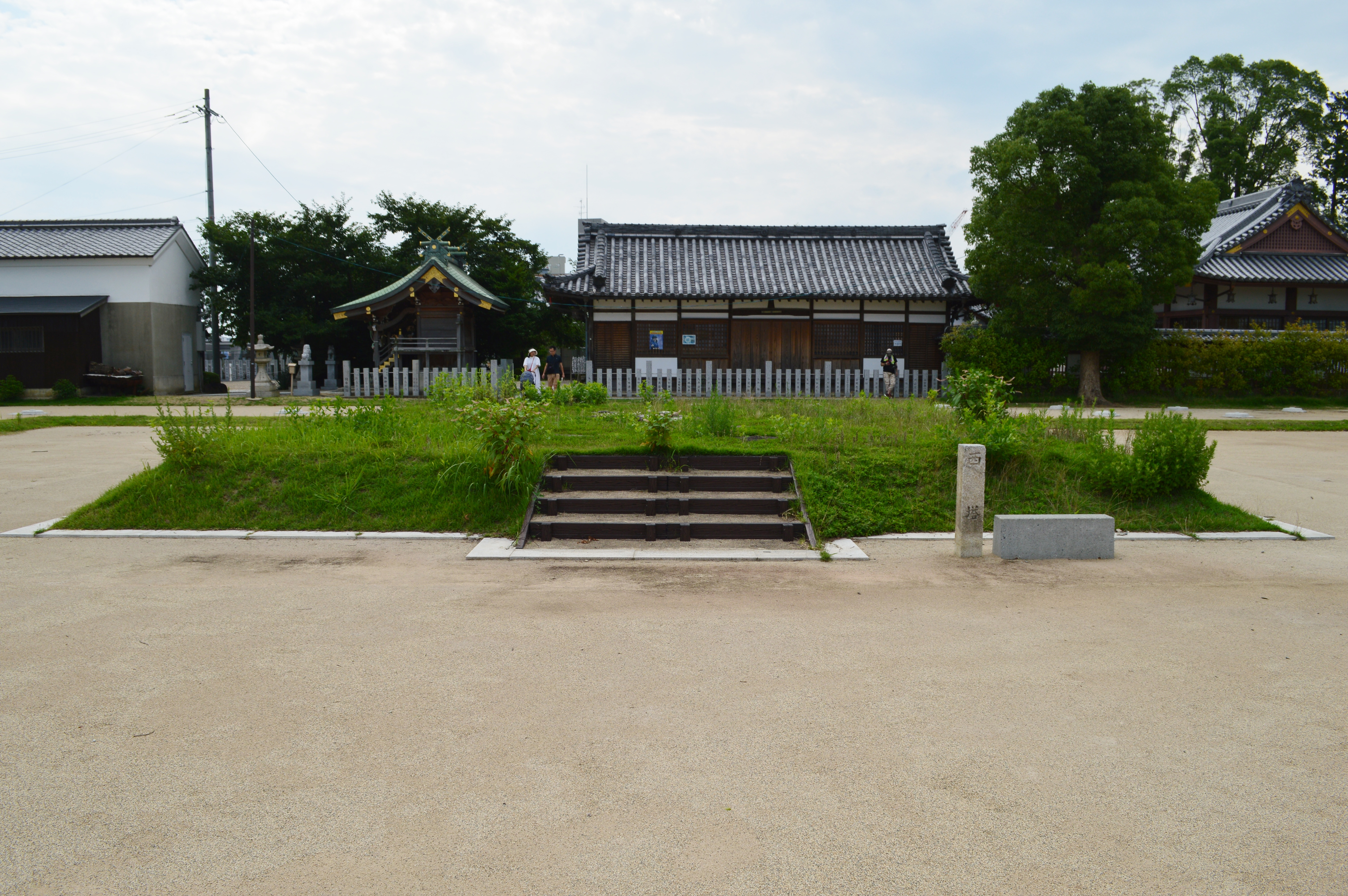
Site of the West Pagoda

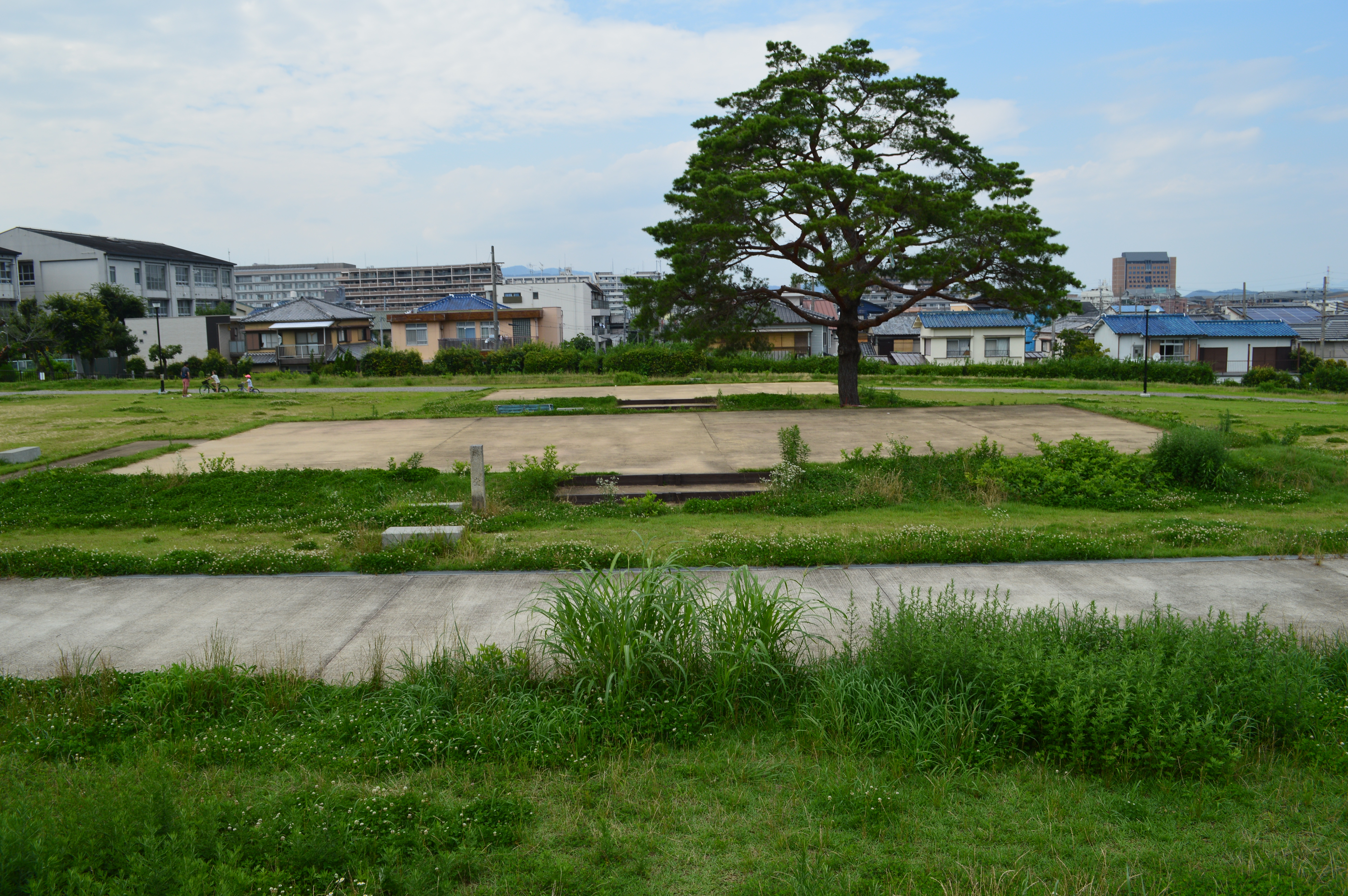
Site of the Lecture Hall

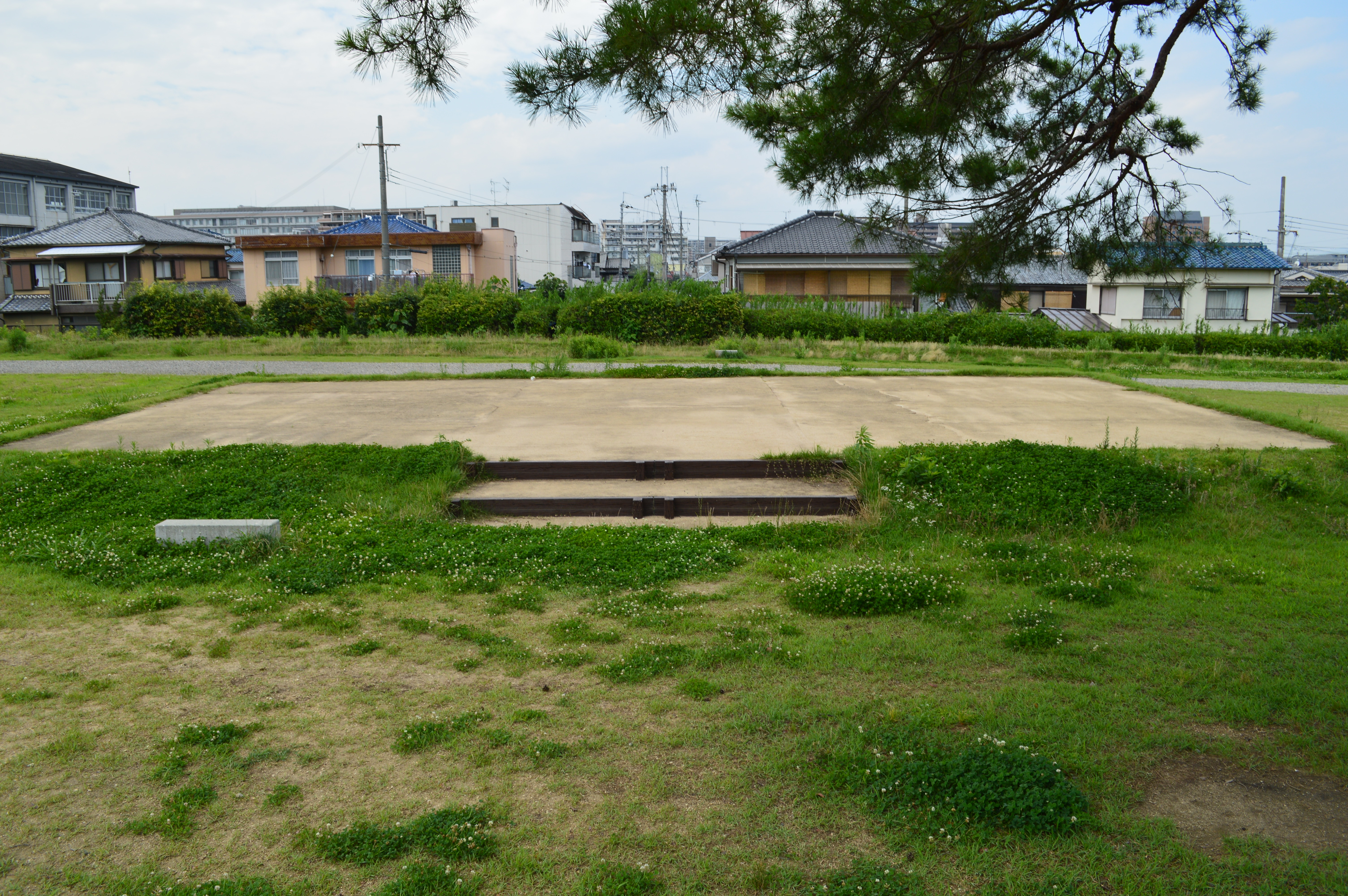
Site of an unidentified building in the north of the site

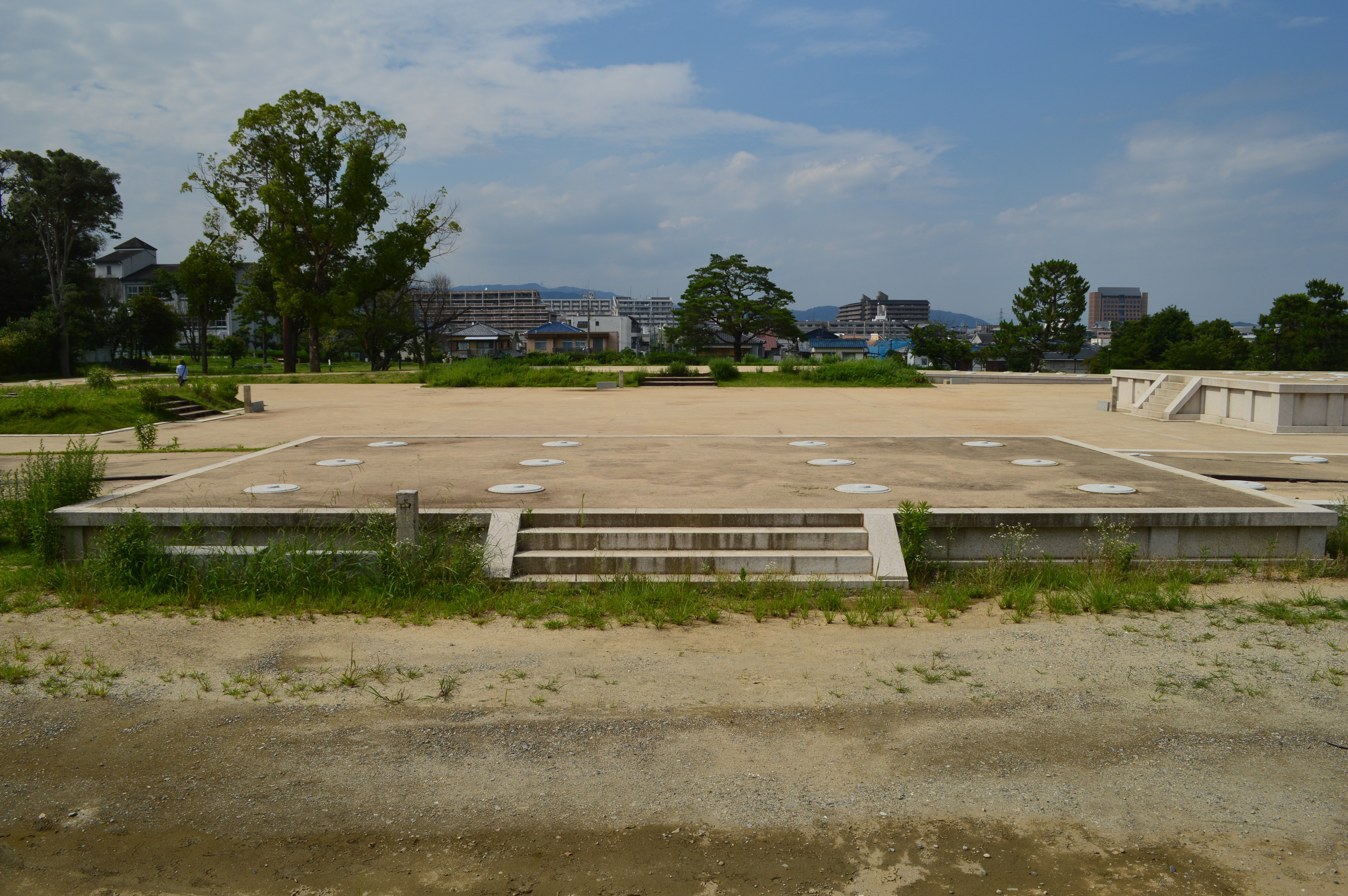
Site of the Middle Gate

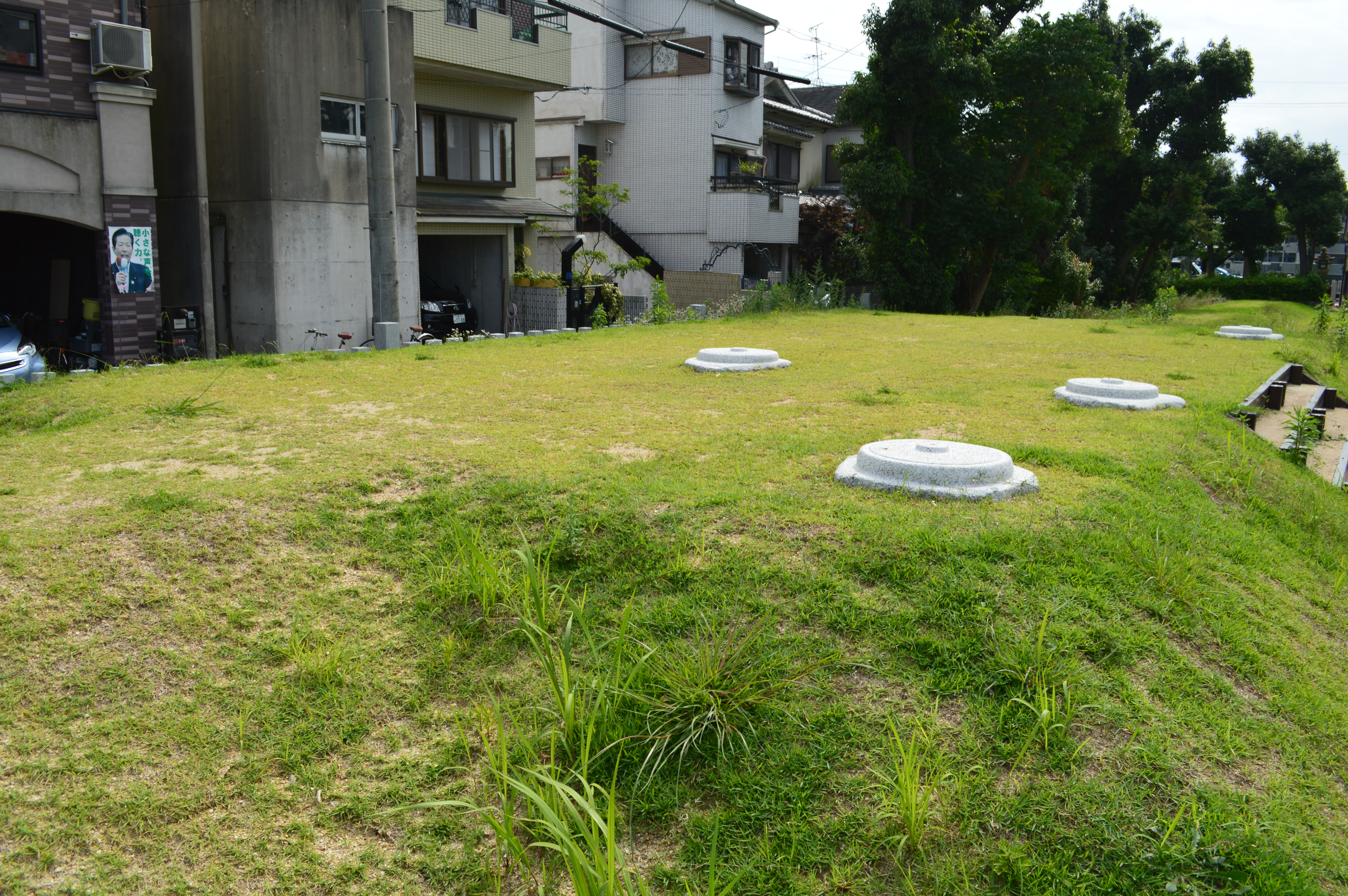
Site of the South Gate

== See also ==
- List of Historic Sites of Japan (Osaka)
