= Botanical Gardens School of Science Osaka Metropolitan University =

Botanical gardens in Katano, Osaka, Japan

Botanical Gardens, School of Science, Osaka Metropolitan University
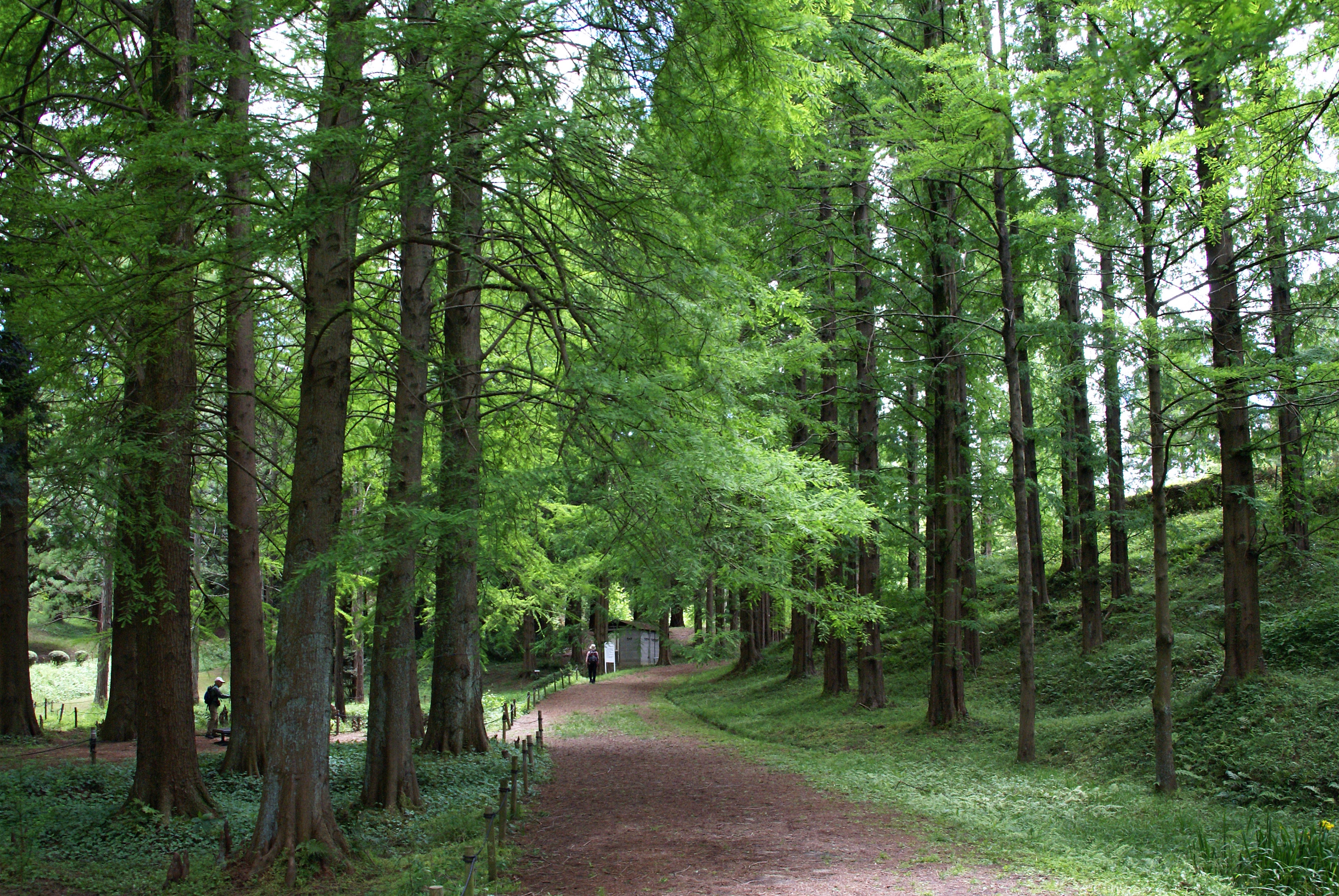
- Botanical Gardens School of Science Osaka Metropolitan University
- Interactive map of Botanical Gardens, School of Science, Osaka Metropolitan University
- Type: Botanical Gardens
- Location: Katano, Osaka, Japan
- Coordinates: 34°45′49″N 135°40′54″E
- Area: 255,300 square metres (63.1 acres)
- Created: 1950
- Public transit: Kisaichi Station

The Botanical Gardens, School of Science, Osaka Metropolitan University (大阪公立大学理学部附属植物園, Ōsaka Kouritsu Daigaku Rigakubu Fuzoku Shokubutsuen; 26 hectares) are botanical gardens operated by Osaka Metropolitan University. They are near the Keihan-Kisaichi Station, Katano, Osaka, Japan and open to the public.

The gardens were established in 1950 and contain about 4500 species from around the world, including more than 1,000 species native to Japan. They also contain representatives of 11 Japanese forest types. The gardens' maple collection includes Acer insulare, A. pictum (mono), A. japonicum, A. sieboldianum, A. rufinerve, A. nipponicum, A. pycnanthum, A. carpinifolium and A. amoenum.

Research accomplishments include discovery of the fossil genus Metasequoia by Dr. Shigeru Miki, as well as ongoing activities in systematics, ecology, physiology, genetics, horticulture, and dendrology.

== References and external links ==
- Official web page (Japanese)
- Osaka City University
- Photographs of gardens' maples

== See also ==
- List of botanical gardens in Japan
