= Kuzuha Battery =

Kuzuha Battery Site
- 楠葉台場 (Japanese)
- Location within Osaka Prefecture Location within Japan
- 34°52′32.2″N 135°40′53.4″E
- Type: fortification
- Location: Hirakata, Osaka, Japan

History
- Built: 1863
- Demolished: 1871
- National Historic Site of Japan

The Kuzuha Battery Site (楠葉台場, Kuzuha daiba ato) was a Bakumatsu period coastal artillery battery erected on the Yodo River in the Kuzuhanakanoshiba neighborhood of the Hirakata in the Kansai region of Japan. The ruins were designated a National Historic Site in 2011. It is also called the Yawata Kanmon (八幡関門).

== Background ==
In the late Edo period, the Tokugawa shogunate was increasing alarmed by incursions by foreign ships into Japanese territorial waters, fearing that these kurofune warships of the United States or other Western powers would attempt to end Japan's self-imposed national isolation policy by force, or would attempt an invasion of Japan by landing hostile military forces. Numerous feudal domains were ordered to establish fortifications along their coastlines with shore artillery located at strategic locations. The Kuzuha Battery Site is rare in that it is a riverine site, whereas all other known Bakumatsu artillery sites are on the coast.

In the case of the Kuzuha Battery, in 1854 the Imperial Russian frigate Diana under the command of Admiral Yevfimiy Putyatin appeared in Osaka Bay. In 1863, Matsudaira Katamori, the Kyoto Shugoshoku was ordered to fortify both banks of the Yodo River against the possibly that foreign warships could go up the river and attack the imperial capital of Kyoto.

The site selected was at the western foot of the Otokoyama hill, the location of Iwashimizu Hachiman-gu on the left bank of the Yodo River. The Kuzuha Battery was in the form of a redan with an open back and a six-meter wide moat. It was equipped with a gunpowder magazine and three cannons (two facing west and one facing south). The design of the fortification was by Katsu Kaishū. Another fortification, the Takahama Daiba, was established on the opposite bank of the river, but nothing of this other fortification has survived. The battery served a secondary purpose as a barrier to prevent the forces of Chōshū Domain and other anti-Tokugawa shogunate forces from entering Kyoto.

During the Battle of Toba-Fushimi at the start of the Boshin War, a large force of pro-Tokugawa troops from Obama Domain garrisoned the Kuzuha Battery; however, the Takahama Daiba on the opposite side of the river was garrisoned by troops from Tsu Domain, which defected to the imperial side. Kusuha Daiba responded by attacking Takahama Daiba, but as the new imperial forces entered the left bank of the Yodo River, the defenders abandoned their position and retreated to Osaka. The major reason was that the design of the fortification was for defense against attackers coming upstream by river, and its landward defenses were negligible.

In the Meiji period, the site became wasteland, with only a portion of the southern moat surviving. The Keihan Electric Railway tracks built in 1910 cut through the western side of the site. The location of the Kuzuha Battery was only determined in 2005 when contemporary documents were re-examined and the city of Hirakata sponsored an archaeological excavation. The site is about a six-minute walk from Hashimoto Station on the Keihan Main Line.

== See also ==
- List of Historic Sites of Japan (Osaka)
