= Hirakata =

City in northeastern Osaka Prefecture, Japan

Hirakata 枚方市
- Core city
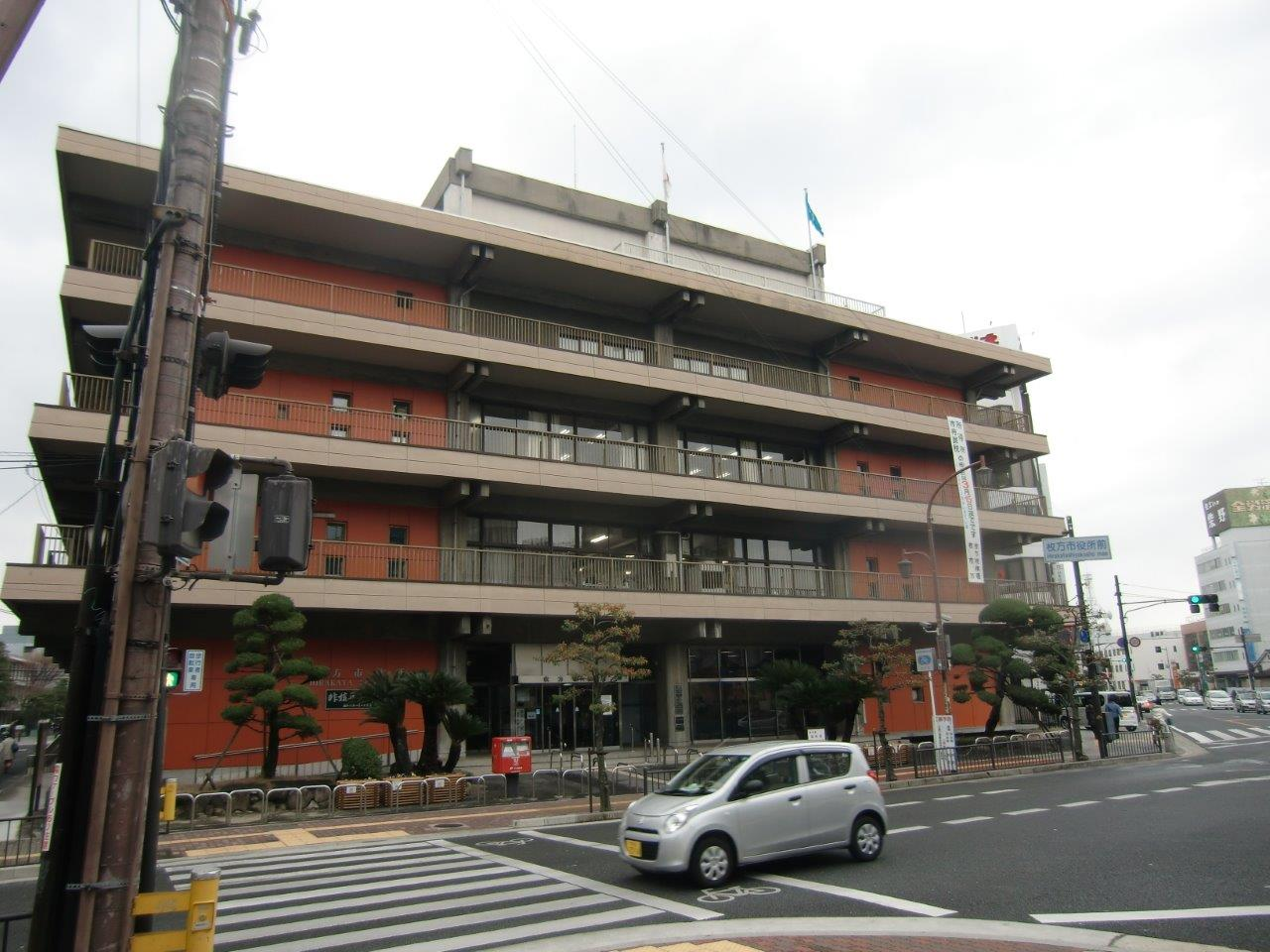
- Hirakata City hall

- Flag Emblem

- Location of Hirakata in Osaka Prefecture

- Location in Japan
- Coordinates: 34°49′N 135°39′E
- Country: Japan
- Region: Kansai
- Prefecture: Osaka

Government
  - Mayor: Takashi Fushimi

Area
  - Total: 65.12 km^{2} (25.14 sq mi)

Population (December 31, 2021)
  - Total: 397,681
  - Density: 6,107/km^{2} (15,820/sq mi)
- Time zone: UTC+09:00 (JST)
- City hall address: 2-1-20 Ogaito-chō, Hirakata-shi, Osaka-fu; 573-8666
- Climate: Cfa
- Website: Official website
- Symbols
- Bird: Common kingfisher
- Flower: Chrysanthemum
- Tree: Willow

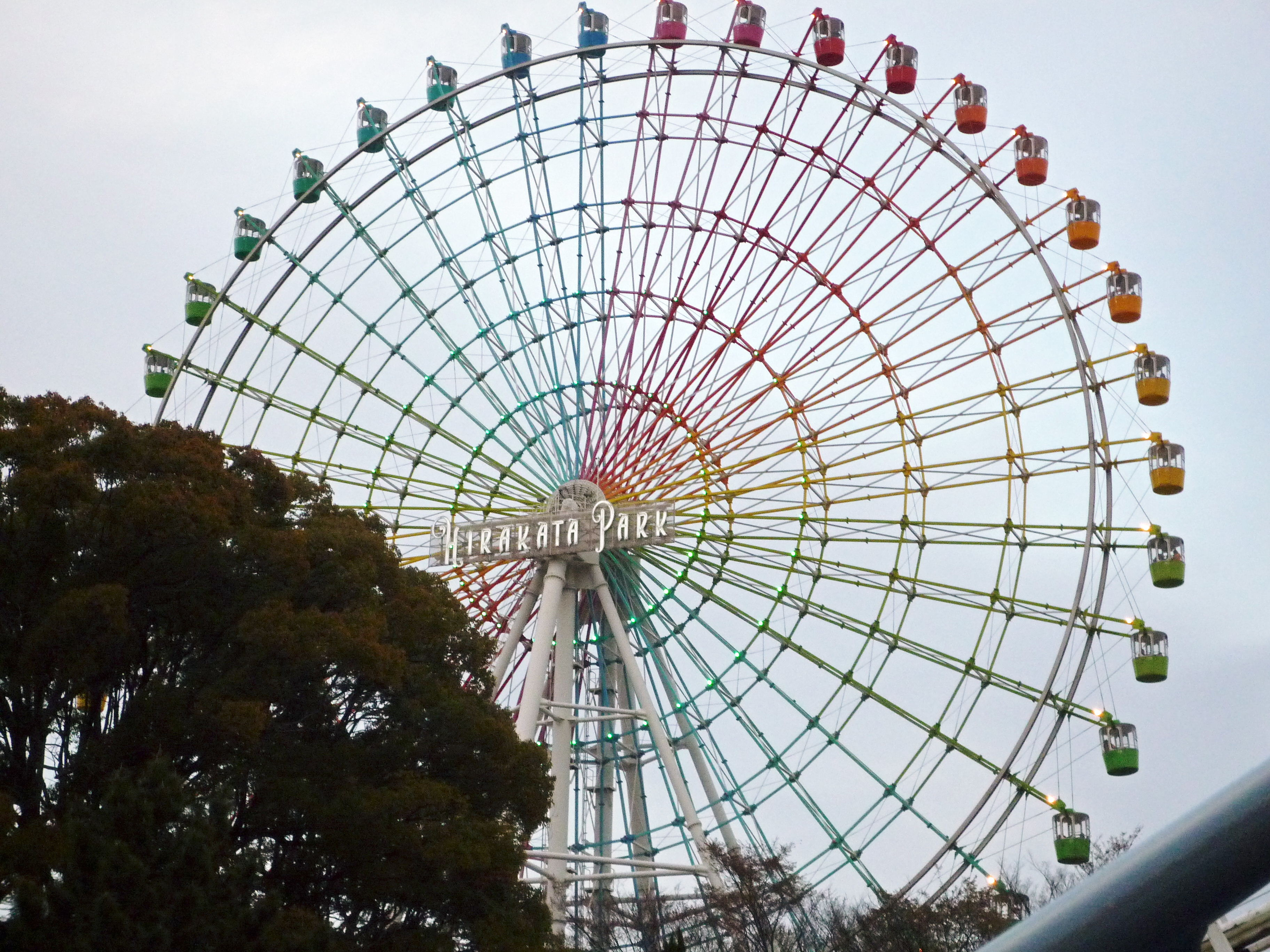
Hirakata Park

Hirakata (枚方市, Hirakata-shi) is a city in northeastern Osaka Prefecture, Japan. As of 31 December 2021, the city had an estimated population of 397,681 in 183075 households and a population density of 6100 persons per km^{2}. The total area of the city is 65.12 square kilometres (25.14 sq mi).

== Geography ==
Hirakata is located in the northeast of Osaka Prefecture, almost halfway between the metropolis of Osaka and Kyoto. It is on the left bank of the Yodogawa River, and forms a triangle of 12.0 km (7.5 mi) and 8.7 km (5.4 mi) north–south. It is bordered by the Ikoma Mountains to the east.

=== Climate ===
Hirakata has a humid subtropical climate (Köppen Cfa) characterized by warm summers and cool winters with light to no snowfall. The average annual temperature in Hirakata is 16.2 °C (61.2 °F). The average annual rainfall is 1,389.5 mm (54.70 in) with June as the wettest month. The temperatures are highest on average in August, at around 28.3 °C (82.9 °F), and lowest in January, at around 4.9 °C (40.8 °F).

Climate data for Hirakata (1991−2020 normals, extremes 1977−present)
Month	Jan	Feb	Mar	Apr	May	Jun	Jul	Aug	Sep	Oct	Nov	Dec	Year
Record high °C (°F)	17.7 (63.9)	22.7 (72.9)	26.7 (80.1)	31.0 (87.8)	33.3 (91.9)	36.4 (97.5)	39.8 (103.6)	39.6 (103.3)	37.1 (98.8)	34.0 (93.2)	27.3 (81.1)	25.0 (77.0)	39.8 (103.6)
Mean daily maximum °C (°F)	9.3 (48.7)	10.2 (50.4)	14.1 (57.4)	20.1 (68.2)	25.2 (77.4)	28.1 (82.6)	31.9 (89.4)	33.7 (92.7)	29.3 (84.7)	23.5 (74.3)	17.5 (63.5)	11.8 (53.2)	21.3 (70.3)
Daily mean °C (°F)	4.9 (40.8)	5.5 (41.9)	8.9 (48.0)	14.4 (57.9)	19.4 (66.9)	23.1 (73.6)	27.1 (80.8)	28.3 (82.9)	24.3 (75.7)	18.4 (65.1)	12.5 (54.5)	7.2 (45.0)	16.2 (61.2)
Mean daily minimum °C (°F)	1.0 (33.8)	1.3 (34.3)	4.2 (39.6)	9.1 (48.4)	14.4 (57.9)	19.1 (66.4)	23.4 (74.1)	24.4 (75.9)	20.4 (68.7)	14.2 (57.6)	8.1 (46.6)	3.2 (37.8)	12.0 (53.6)
Record low °C (°F)	−6.2 (20.8)	−7.1 (19.2)	−4.4 (24.1)	−1.1 (30.0)	3.2 (37.8)	9.0 (48.2)	15.3 (59.5)	16.4 (61.5)	9.4 (48.9)	3.1 (37.6)	−0.6 (30.9)	−3.9 (25.0)	−7.1 (19.2)
Average precipitation mm (inches)	49.8 (1.96)	61.6 (2.43)	106.2 (4.18)	102.4 (4.03)	139.1 (5.48)	194.2 (7.65)	183.8 (7.24)	142.5 (5.61)	158.6 (6.24)	136.7 (5.38)	70.5 (2.78)	53.0 (2.09)	1,389.5 (54.70)
Average precipitation days (≥ 1.0mm)	5.5	6.7	9.6	9.7	10.0	12.0	11.7	8.6	10.2	8.9	6.6	6.2	105.1
Mean monthly sunshine hours	135.0	128.7	161.2	184.4	193.4	141.7	155.9	204.9	153.9	158.1	143.2	139.9	1,912.2
Source: Japan Meteorological Agency

=== Demographics ===
Per Japanese census data, the population of Hirakata rose rapidly in the 1960s and 1970s, and less rapidly since.

Historical population
Year	Pop.	±%
1920	23,714	—
1930	27,878	+17.6%
1940	39,306	+41.0%
1950	52,817	+34.4%
1960	80,312	+52.1%
1970	217,369	+170.7%
1980	353,358	+62.6%
1990	390,788	+10.6%
2000	402,563	+3.0%
2010	407,997	+1.3%

Eriko Aoki, author of "Korean children, textbooks, and educational practices in Japanese primary schools," stated that the city's location in proximity to both Osaka City and Kyoto contributed to its population growth of ten times its previous size from around 1973 to 2013.

==== Ethnic Koreans ====
As of 2013 the city has about 2,000 ethnic Koreans. Most Hirakata Koreans, including children of school age, use Japanese names. Many Koreans in Hirakata operate their own businesses. Hirakata has the "mother's society" or "Omoni no Kai", a voluntary association of ethnic Korean mothers. It also has branches of the Chongryon and Mindan, Japan's two major Korean associations. Hirakata has no particular Korean neighborhoods. There were about 3,000 ethnic Koreans in Hirakata in the pre-World War II period. In the 1930s Hirakata Koreans, fearful of keeping their own jobs, had negative attitudes towards Osaka-based Koreans who were looking for employment after having lost their jobs. Military construction was the most common job sector of that era's Korean population. Eriko Aoki stated that in 2013 there was still a sense of difference between the Koreans in Hirakata and the Koreans in Osaka.

== History ==
The area of the modern city of Hirakata was within ancient Kawachi Province. The place name "Hirakata" is in the Kojiki and Nihon Shoki. The Buddhist temple of Kudara-dera dates to the Asuka period.

The Hirakata Town was established with the creation of the modern municipalities system on April 1, 1889. Hirakata was elevated to city status on August 1, 1947. On April 1, 2001, Hirakata was designated as a special city of Japan. On April 1, 2014, Hirakata became a Core city with increased local autonomy.

== Government ==
Hirakata has a mayor-council form of government with a directly elected mayor and a unicameral city council of 32 members. Hirakata, together with neighboring Katano, contributes four members to the Osaka Prefectural Assembly. In terms of national politics, the city is part of Osaka 11th district of the lower house of the Diet of Japan.

== Economy ==
Hirakata's modern industry began with the munitions industry supplying to the Imperial Japanese Army and numerous civilian textile and clothing manufacturers. In early March 1939, a site associated with the arms industry blew up, killing 500 people.

=== Companies with offices in Hirakata ===
- Komatsu Osaka plant
- Sanyo Electric Co R&D

== Education ==
=== Colleges and universities ===
- Kansai Gaidai University
- Kansai Medical University
- Osaka Dental University
- Osaka International University
- Osaka Institute of Technology
- Setsunan University

=== Primary and secondary education ===
Hirakata has 45 public elementary schools and 19 public middle schools operated by the city government and six public high schools operated by the Osaka Prefectural Department of Education, and one by Osaka City. There is also one private elementary school, two private middle schools and three private high schools. The prefecture also operates two special education schools for the handicapped.

Prefectural senior high schools

- Hirakatsuda High School (大阪府立枚方津田高等学校)
- Korigaoka High School (大阪府立香里丘高等学校)
- Osaka Prefectural Hirakata High School (大阪府立枚方高等学校)
- Osaka Prefectural Makino High School (大阪府立牧野高等学校)
- Osaka Prefectural Nagao High School (大阪府立長尾高等学校)
- Hirakata Nagisa High School (大阪府立枚方なぎさ高等学校)

Municipal high schools

- Osaka City Senior High School (大阪市立高等学校) – In Hirakata

Private senior high schools:

- Josho Keiko Gakuen Junior and Senior High School (常翔啓光学園高等学校)
- Tokai University Gyosei Junior and Senior High School (東海大学付属仰星高等学校)
- Toyo Gakuen Nagaodani High School (長尾谷高等学校)

== Transportation ==
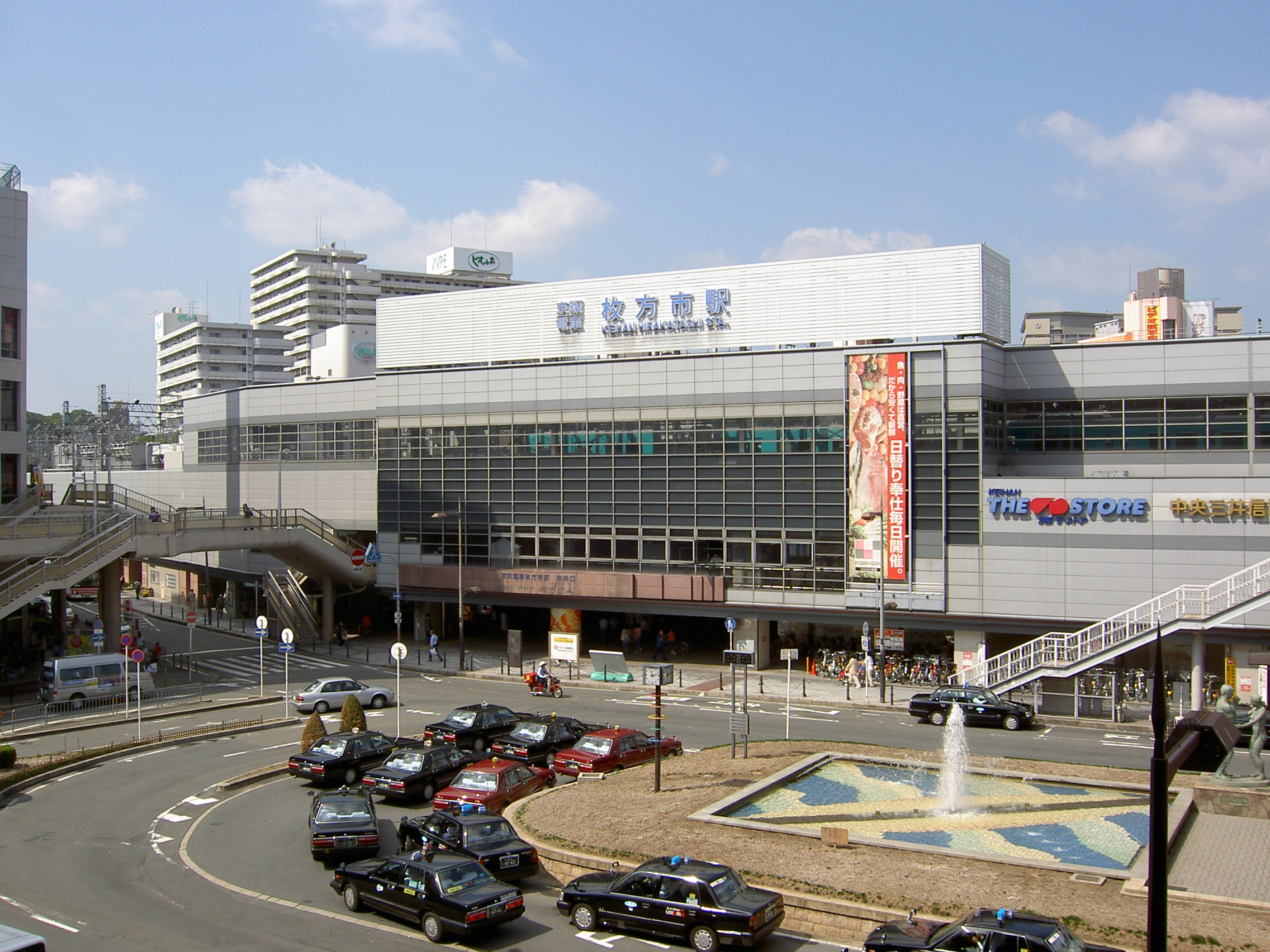
Hirakata-shi Station

=== Railway ===
JR West – Katamachi Line (Gakkentoshi Line)

- Tsuda - Fujisaka - Nagao

Keihan Electric Railway - Keihan Main Line

- Kōzenji - Hirakata-kōen - Hirakata-shi - Goten-yama - Makino - Kuzuha

Keihan Electric Railway - Katano Line

- Hirakata-shi - Miyanosaka - Hoshigaoka - Murano

=== Highway ===
- Second Keihan Highway
- National Route 1 Daini Keihan Road (toll road)
- National Route 168
- National Route 170
- National Route 307

== Sister cities ==
- Shimanto, Kōchi, Japan, friendship city agreement since 1974 (with former Nakamura city)
- Betsukai, Hokkaidō, Japan, friendship city agreement since 1987
- Takamatsu, Kagawa, Japan, friendship city agreement since 1987 (with former Shionoe town)
- Changning District, Shanghai, China, sister city agreement since 1987
- Logan City, Queensland, Australia, sister city agreement since 1995

== Notable sites ==
Hirakata T-SITE

- Hirakata Park, an amusement park that includes roller coasters made of wood.
- Hirakata T-SITE
- Kudara-dera ruins
- Kinyakurumazuka Kofun
- Kuzuha Battery Site

== Notable people from Hirakata ==
- Hikaru Nakamura, Japanese American chess player
- Janne Da Arc, Japanese visual kei rock band
- Iori Kogawa, Japanese AV Idol
- Koichiro Yoshinaga, Japanese former Nippon Professional Baseball catcher/infielder
- Airi Shimizu, Japanese gravure idol, actress and variety tarento
- Yuji Naka, Japanese video game programmer, designer, and producer who made Sonic the Hedgehog
- Satoshi Hashimoto, Japanese actor and voice actor
- Nobukazu Takemura, Japanese musician and artist
- Haruto Shirai, Japanese football player
- Kenji Honnami, former Japanese football player
- Yuki Kuniyoshi, professional Japanese baseball player
- Junichi Okada, singer, actor and member of popular Japanese boy band V6
- Katsuhisa Inamori, former Japanese football player
- Midori, Japanese American violinist and classical musician
- Kenji Moriwaki, Japanese comedian and radio personality
- Masahito Noto, Japanese football player
- Hirofumi Mukai, Japanese professional boxer
- Yohei Takeda, Japanese football player and goalkeeper
- Hisaya Morishige, Japanese actor and comedian
- Yuji Hino, Japanese professional wrestler
- Yuka Ishii, Japanese writer
- Takayuki Fukumura, Japanese football player
- Yoshimitsu Takashima, Japanese politician of the Democratic Party of Japan, a member of the House of Councillors in the Diet (national legislature)
- Takumi Ozaki, member of INI (Japanese boy group)
- Hono Tamura, member of Sakurazaka46
- Keiya Sento, Japanese football player, currently plays for Machida Zelvia
- Sawa Nimura, Japanese actress
