= Goten-yama Station =

Railway station in Hirakata, Osaka Prefecture, Japan

Goten-yama Station 御殿山駅
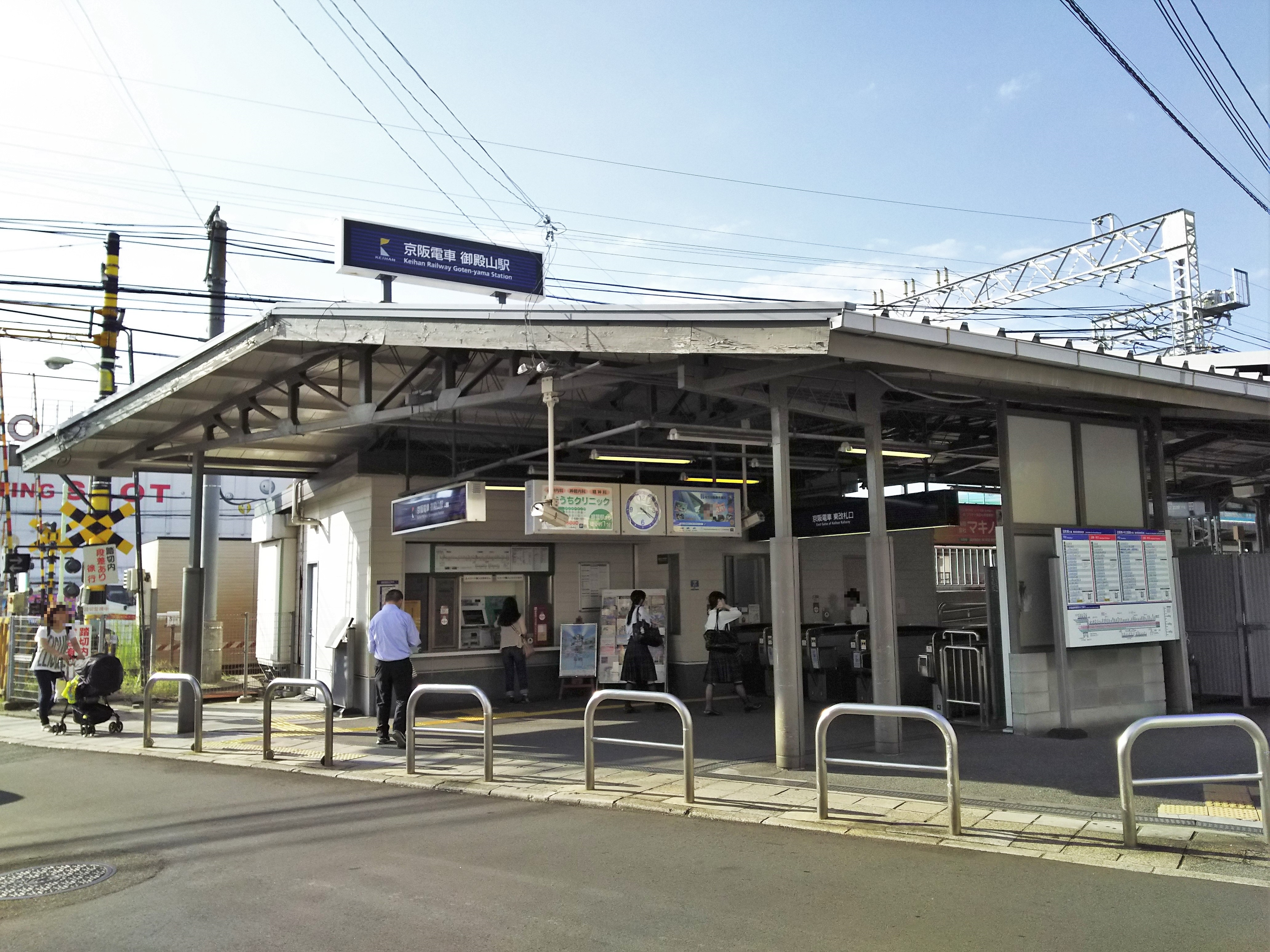
- Goten-yama Station, August 2016

General information
- Location: 2 Gotenyamachō, Hirakata-shi, Osaka-fu 573-1182; Japan
- Coordinates: 34.8293°N 135.6539°E
- Operator: Keihan Electric Railway
- Line: ■ Keihan Main Line
- Distance: 23.5 km from Yodoyabashi
- Platforms: 2 side platforms
- Connections: Bus terminal

Other information
- Status: Staffed
- Station code: KH22
- Website: Official website

History
- Opened: 25 May 1929; 97 years ago

Passengers
- FY2019: 13,918 daily
Location
- Location within Osaka Prefecture Location within Japan

Goten-yama Station (御殿山駅, Goten-yama-eki) is a passenger railway station in located in the city of Hirakata, Osaka Prefecture, Japan, operated by the private railway company Keihan Electric Railway.

== Lines ==
Goten-yama Station is served by the Keihan Main Line, and is located 23.5 km from the starting point of the line at Yodoyabashi Station.

== Station layout ==
The station has two ground-level opposed side platforms connected by an unground passage.

=== Platforms ===
| 1 | ■ Keihan Main Line | for Chushojima, Sanjo and Demachiyanagi |
| 2 | ■ Keihan Main Line | for Hirakatashi, Kyobashi, Yodoyabashi and Nakanoshima |

== Adjacent stations ==
| « | Service | » |
Keihan Railway Keihan Main Line
Rapid Limited Express for Demachiyanagi (快速特急): Does not stop at this station
Limited Express (特急): Does not stop at this station
Commuter Rapid Express for Nakanoshima (通勤快急): Does not stop at this station
Rapid Express (快速急行): Does not stop at this station
Midnight Express for Kuzuha (深夜急行): Does not stop at this station
Express (急行): Does not stop at this station
| Hirakatashi | Commuter Sub Express for Yodoyabashi or Nakanoshima (通勤準急) | Makino |
| Hirakatashi | Sub Express (準急) | Makino |
| Hirakatashi | Semi-Express (区間急行) | Makino |
| Hirakatashi | Local (普通) | Makino |

== History ==
The station was opened on May 25, 1929.

== Passenger statistics ==
In fiscal 2019, the station was used by an average of 13,918 passengers daily.

== Surrounding area ==
- Fukuda General Hospital
- Gotenyama Shrine
- Gotenyama Library
- Hirakata Nagisa High School
- Kansai University of Foreign Studies(Gotenyama Campus)
- Kinki College of Information Technology

== See also ==
- List of railway stations in Japan
