= Miyanosaka Station (Osaka) =

Railway station in Hiraakata, Osaka Prefecture, Japan

Miyanosaka Station 宮之阪駅
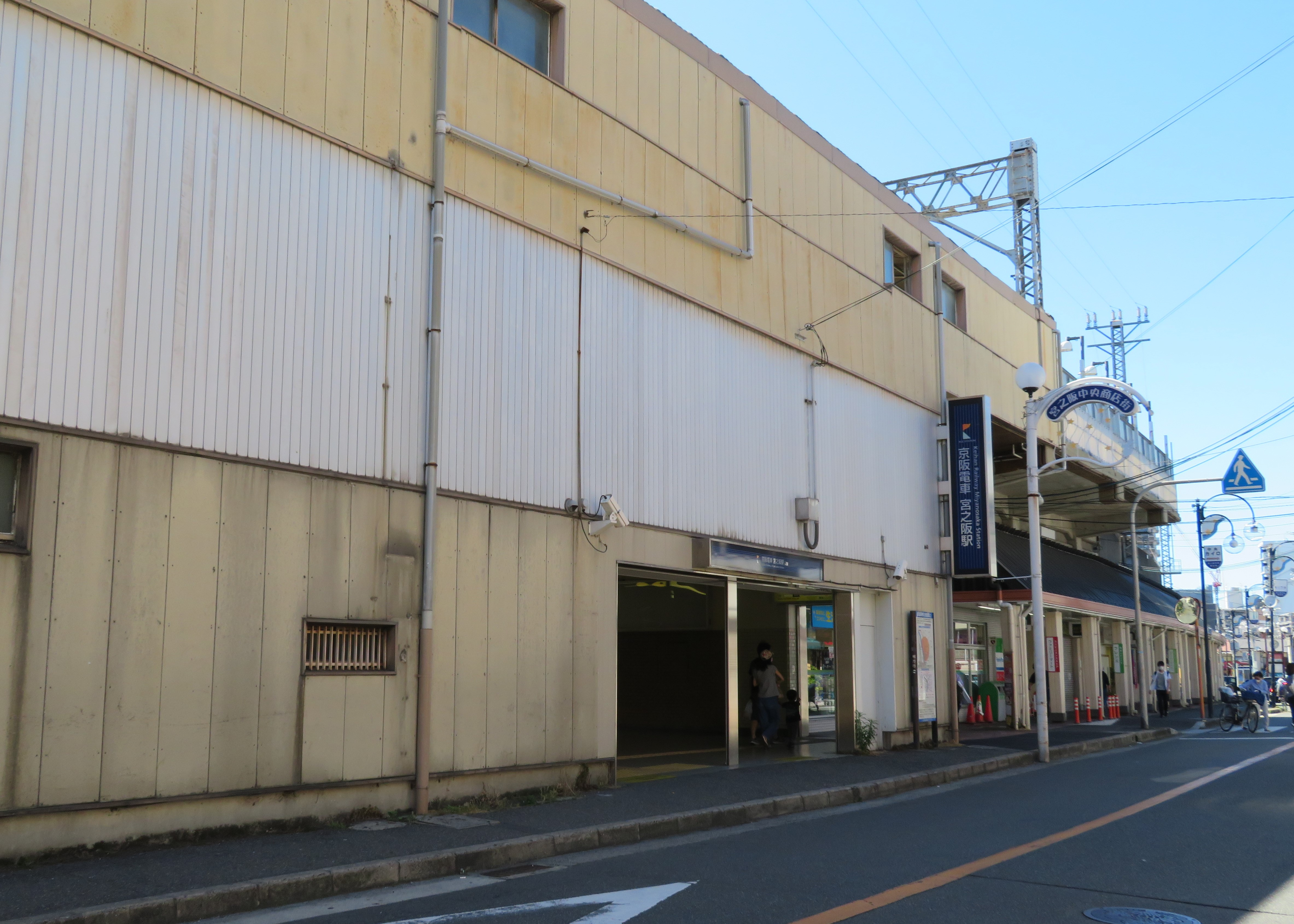
- Miyanosaka Station

General information
- Location: 9-43 Miyanosaka 1-chōme, Hirakata-shi, Osaka-fu 573-0022; Japan
- Coordinates: 34°48′49″N 135°39′24″E
- Operator: Keihan Electric Railway
- Line: Katano Line
- Distance: 1.0 km from Hirakatashi
- Platforms: 2 side platforms
- Connections: Bus stop

Other information
- Station code: KH61
- Website: Official website

History
- Opened: 11 September 1940
- Former names: Chugu (to 1971)

Passengers
- FY2019: 6,153 daily

Services
Preceding station	Keihan Electric Railway	Following station
Hirakatashi Terminus	Katano Line	Hoshigaoka towards Kisaichi
Location
- Location within Osaka Prefecture Location within Japan

Miyanosaka Station (宮之阪駅, Miyanosaka-eki) is a passenger railway station in located in the city of Hirakata, Osaka Prefecture, Japan, operated by the private railway company Keihan Electric Railway.

== Lines ==
Miyanosaka Station is a station of the Keihan Katano Line, and is located 1.0 kilometers from the terminus of the line at Hirakatashi Station.

== Station layout ==
The station has two elevated opposed side platforms with the station building underneath.

=== Platforms ===
1	■ Keihan Katano Line	for Hirakatashi, Yodoyabashi, and Demachiyanagi
2	■ Keihan Katano Line	for Katanoshi and Kisaichi

== History ==
The station was opened on September 11, 1940 as Chugu Station (中宮駅). It was renamed to its present name on June 20, 1971.

== Passenger statistics ==
In fiscal 2019, the station was used by an average of 6,153 passengers daily.

== Surrounding area ==
- Kudara-dera ruins
- Kudara Shrine
- Osaka Prefectural Psychiatric Medical Center

== See also ==
- List of railway stations in Japan
