= Masahito Noto =

Japanese footballer

Masahito Noto 能登 正人
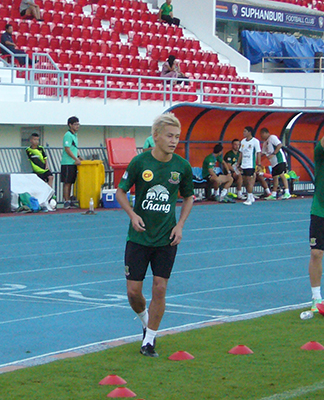

Personal information
- Full name: Masahito Noto
- Date of birth: 10 April 1990 (age 36)
- Place of birth: Hirakata, Osaka, Japan
- Height: 1.81 m (5 ft 11 1/2 in)
- Position: Forward

Team information
- Current team: Svabo Tokyo
- Number: 2

Youth career
- 2006–2008: Tokai Univ. Daigo High School

Senior career*
Years	Team	Apps	(Gls)
2010–2011	Gonsenheim	16	(7)
2011–2013	Hannover 96 II	22	(3)
2013	Buriram United	0	(0)
2013–2014	Chainat	15	(12)
2014	Army United	18	(17)
2014–2015	Bangkok	22	(19)
2015	JEF United Chiba	1	(0)
2016	Lanexang United	21	(12)
2017	Persiba Balikpapan	15	(1)
2018	Tokyo United FC	14	(2)
2019–2022	Nankatsu SC	14	(0)
2023–	Schwabo Tokyo	0	(0)
- * Club domestic league appearances and goals as of 12 November 2023, 16:22 (UTC)

Masahito Noto (能登 正人, Noto Masahito; born 10 April 1990) is a Japanese footballer who plays as a forward for Svabo Tokyo.

== Career ==
Noto was born in Osaka, Japan, and has played for SV Gonsenheim, the Hannover 96 reserve team, Buriram United, and Chainat F.C.

In 2023, Noto officially joined to Japanese amateur club, Svabo Tokyo for 2023 season after departure from Nankatsu SC.
