= Katano =

Katano 交野市
- City
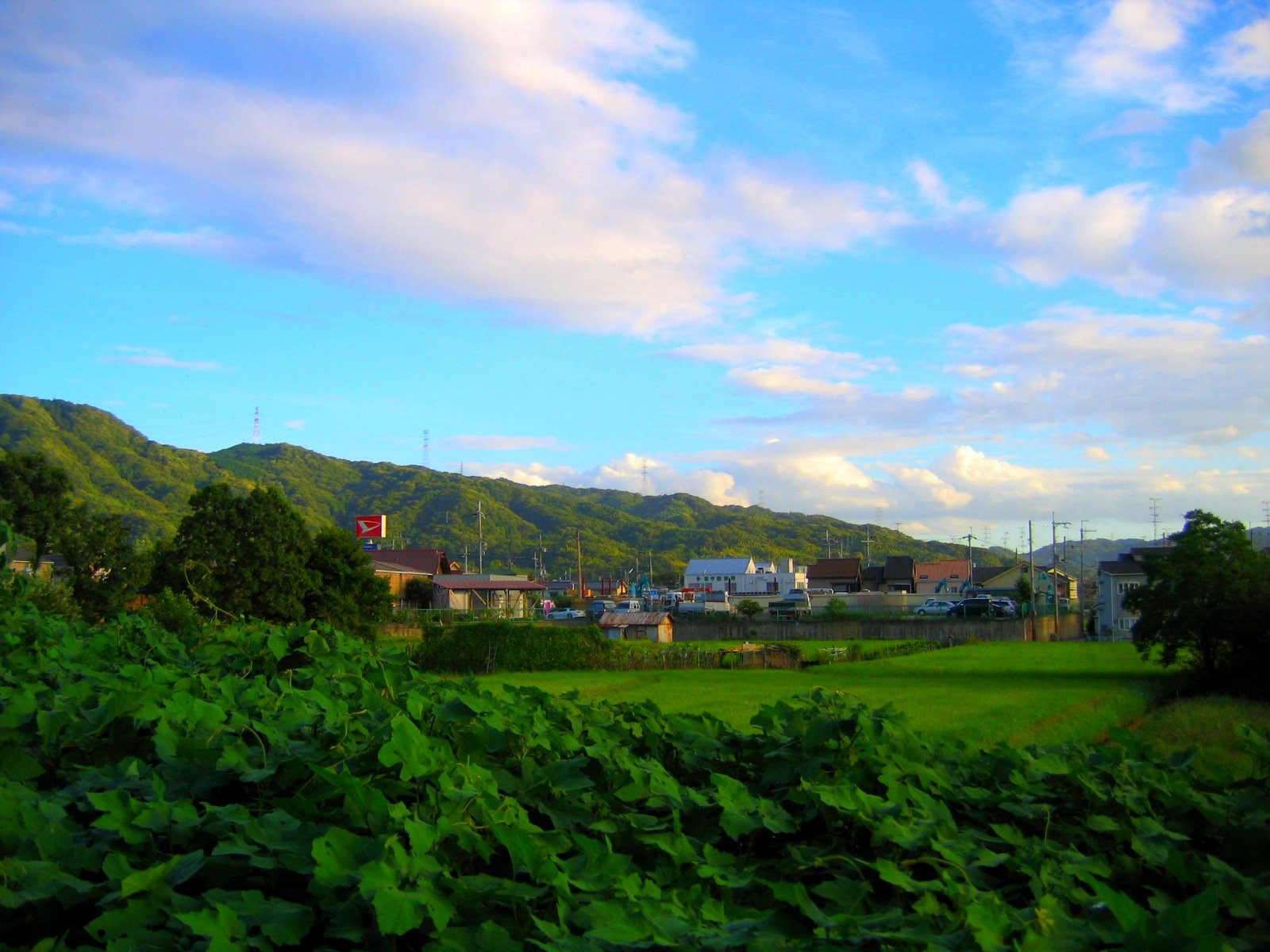
- Rice fields in Katano City

- Flag Emblem

- Location of Katano in Osaka Prefecture

- Location in Japan
- Coordinates: 34°47′N 135°41′E
- Country: Japan
- Region: Kansai
- Prefecture: Osaka

Government
  - Mayor: Kei Yamamoto (from September 2022)

Area
  - Total: 25.55 km^{2} (9.86 sq mi)

Population (January 31, 2022)
  - Total: 77,401
  - Density: 3,029/km^{2} (7,846/sq mi)
- Time zone: UTC+09:00 (JST)
- City hall address: 1-1-1 Kisabe, Katano-shi, Ōsaka-fu 576-0052
- Website: Official website
- Symbols
- Bird: Common pheasant
- Flower: Azalea
- Tree: Sakura

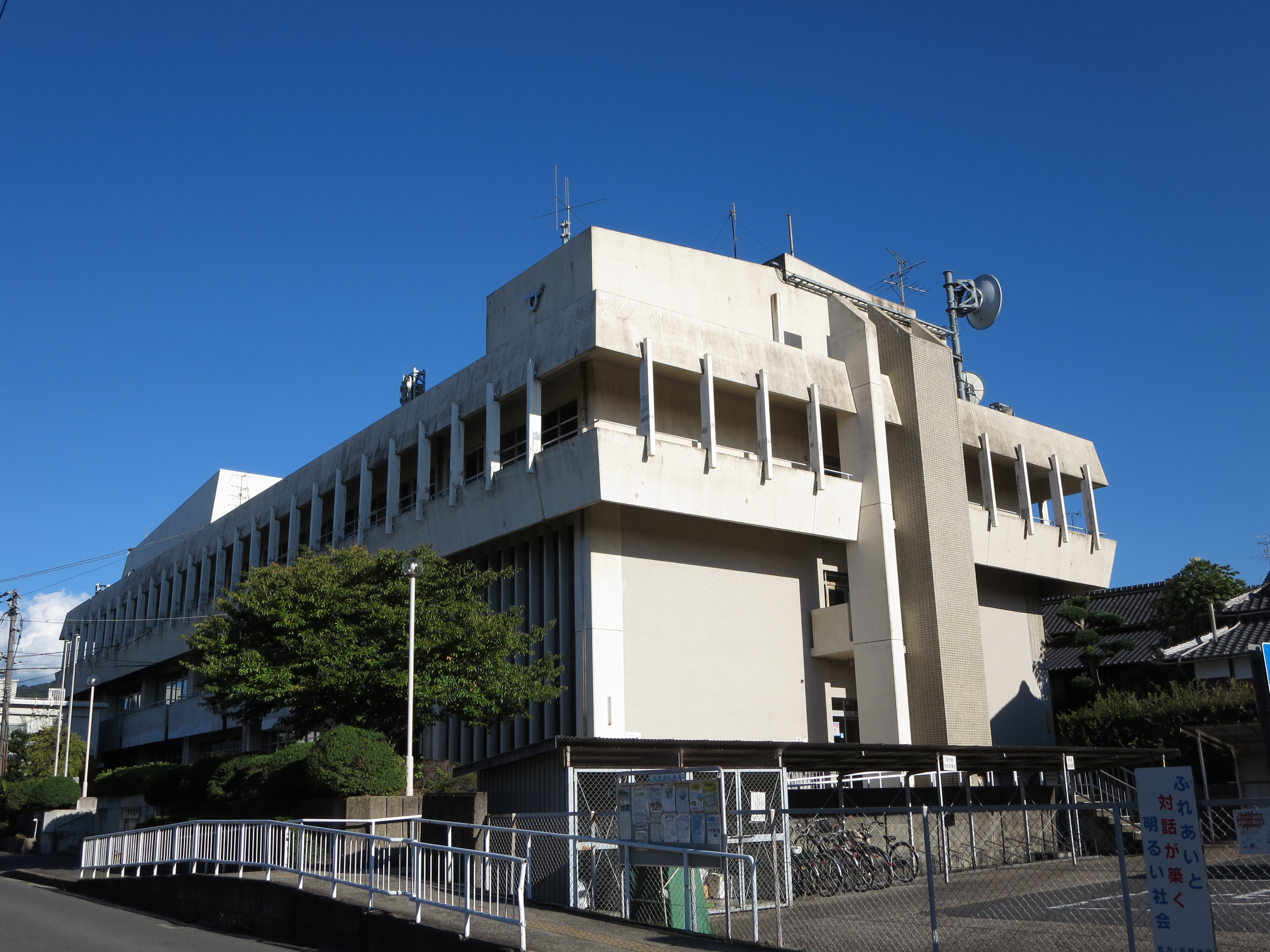
Katano City Hall

Katano (交野市, Katano-shi) is a city located in Osaka Prefecture, Japan. As of 31 December 2021, the city had an estimated population of 77,401 in 33417 households and a population density of 3000 persons per km^{2}. The total area of the city is 25.55 square kilometres (9.86 sq mi).

== Geography ==
Katano is in the northeast of Osaka prefecture, and the Amano River runs north–south in the center.

== Climate ==
Katano has a humid subtropical climate (Köppen Cfa) characterized by warm summers and cool winters with light to no snowfall. The average annual temperature in Katano is 13.9 °C. The average annual rainfall is 1456 mm with September as the wettest month. The temperatures are highest on average in August, at around 25.6 °C, and lowest in January, at around 3.9 °C.

== Demographics ==
Per Japanese census data, the population of Katano has risen steadily over the past century.

Historical population
Year	Pop.	±%
1920	6,507	—
1930	7,396	+13.7%
1940	8,686	+17.4%
1950	11,118	+28.0%
1960	11,825	+6.4%
1970	33,701	+185.0%
1980	61,425	+82.3%
1990	65,308	+6.3%
2000	76,919	+17.8%
2010	77,710	+1.0%

== History ==
The area of the modern city of Katano was within ancient Kawachi Province. The villages of Katano and Iwafune were established within Katano District with the creation of the modern municipalities system on April 1, 1889. On April 1, 1896, the area became part of Kitakawachi District, Osaka. The villages merged July 1, 1939 to form the town of Katano. Katano absorbed the neighboring village of Hoshida on April 1, 1955, and was elevated to city status on November 3, 1971.

== Government ==
Katano has a mayor-council form of government with a directly elected mayor and a unicameral city council of 15 members. Katano contributes one member to the Osaka Prefectural Assembly. In terms of national politics, the city is part of Osaka 11th district of the lower house of the Diet of Japan.

== Education ==
Katano has ten public elementary schools and four public middle schools operated by the city government and one public high school operated by the Osaka Prefectural Department of Education. There is also one private middle school and one private high school. The prefecture also operates one special education school for the handicapped.

== Transportation ==
=== Railway ===
JR West – Katamachi Line (Gakkentoshi Line)

- Hoshida - Kawachi-Iwafune

Keihan Electric Railway - Katano Line

- Kōzu - Katano-shi - Kawachi-Mori - Kisaichi

=== Highway ===
- National Route 168

== Sister cities ==
- Collingwood, Ontario, Canada, sister city agreement since 1981

== Local attractions ==
- Botanical Gardens Faculty of Science Osaka City University

== Notable people from Katano ==
- Erika Matsuo, violinist
- Ikioi Shōta, sumo wrestler
- Kaichi Uchida, tennis player
