= Acer insulare =

Conservation status
- Least Concern (IUCN 3.1)

Scientific classification
- Kingdom: Plantae
- Clade: Tracheophytes
- Clade: Angiosperms
- Clade: Eudicots
- Clade: Rosids
- Order: Sapindales
- Family: Sapindaceae
- Genus: Acer
- Section: Acer sect. Macrantha
- Species: A. insulare

Binomial name
- Acer insulare Makino (1910)

Synonyms
- Acer capillipes subsp. insulare (Makino) A.E.Murray (1977)

Species of flowering plant

Acer insulare is a species of maple. It is a small tree native to the islands of Amami Ōshima and Tokunoshima in the northern Ryukyu Islands. It grows in forest edges in hilly and mountainous areas.
