= Katanoshi Station =

Railway station in Katano, Osaka Prefecture, Japan

Katanoshi Station 交野市駅
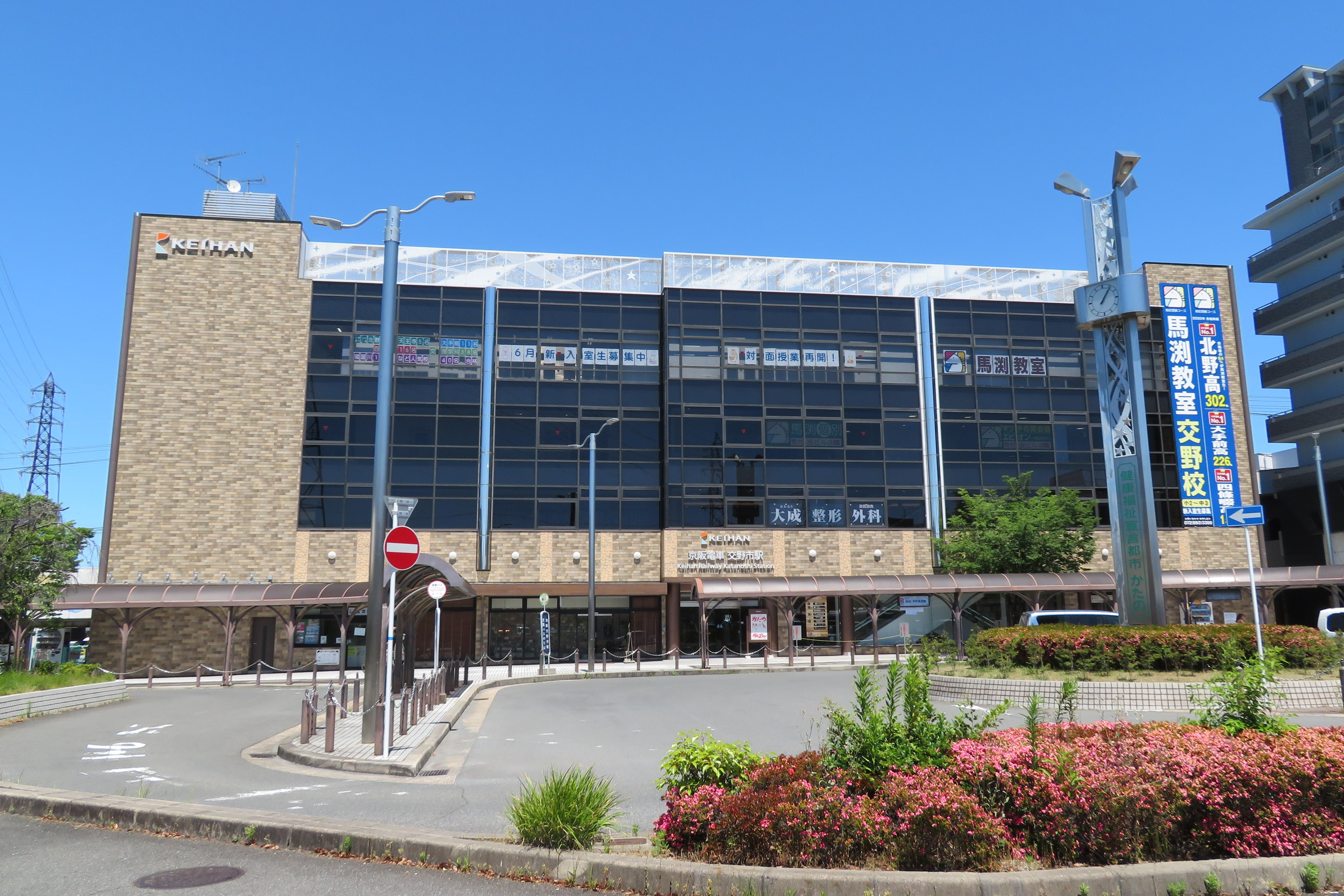
- Katanoshi Station

General information
- Location: 3-chōme-18 Kisabe, Katano-shi, Osaka-fu 576-0052; Japan
- Coordinates: 34°47′13″N 135°40′32″E
- Operator: Keihan Electric Railway
- Line: Katano Line
- Distance: 4.4 km from Hirakatashi
- Platforms: 2 side platforms
- Connections: Bus stop

Other information
- Station code: KH65
- Website: Official website

History
- Opened: 10 July 1929

Passengers
- FY2019: 10,295 daily

Services
Preceding station	Keihan Electric Railway	Following station
Kōzu towards Hirakatashi	Katano Line	Kawachimori towards Kisaichi
Location
- Location within Osaka Prefecture Location within Japan

Katanoshi Station (交野市駅, Katanoshi-eki) is a passenger railway station in located in the city of Katano, Osaka Prefecture, Japan, operated by the private railway company Keihan Electric Railway.

== Lines ==
Katanoshi Station is a station of the Keihan Katano Line, and is located 4.4 kilometers from the terminus of the line at Hirakatashi Station.

== Station layout ==
The station has two ground-level opposed side platforms connected by an elevated station building.

=== Platforms ===
1	■ Keihan Katano Line	for Hirakatashi, Yodoyabashi, and Demachiyanagi
2	■ Keihan Katano Line	for Kisaichi

== History ==
The station was opened on July 10, 1929, as Katano Station (交野駅) . It was renamed November 1, 1977.

== Passenger statistics ==
In fiscal 2019, the station was used by an average of 10,295 passengers daily.

== Surrounding area ==
- Katano City Hall

== See also ==
- List of railway stations in Japan
