= Keihan Katano Line =

Railway line in Osaka prefecture, Japan

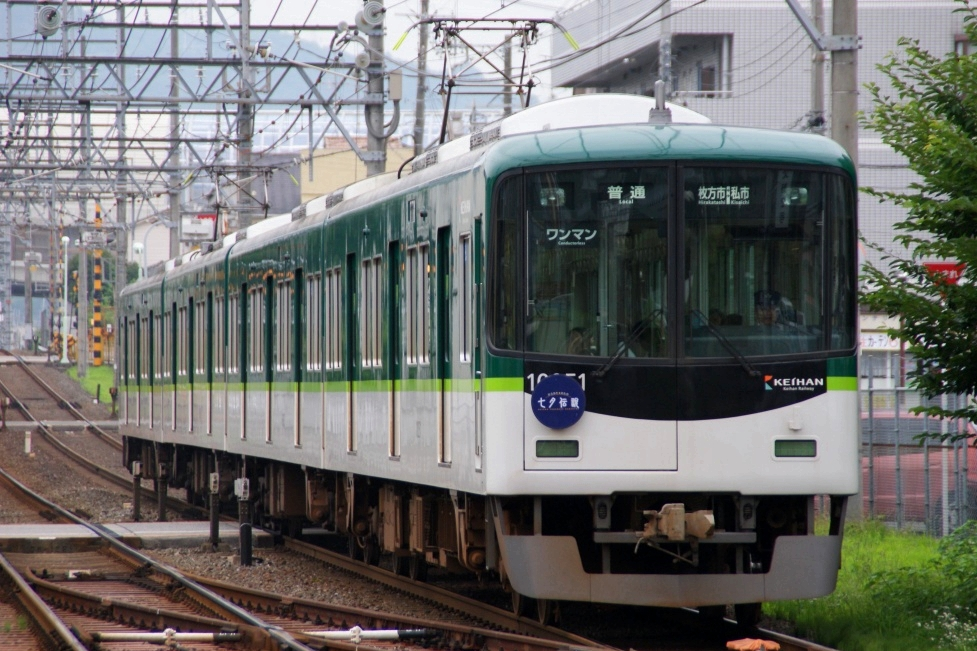
- A Keihan 10000 series EMU on the Keihan Katano Line

Overview
- Native name: 京阪交野線
- Owner: Keihan Electric Railway
- Locale: Osaka Prefecture
- Termini: Hirakatashi; Kisaichi
- Stations: 8

Service
- Type: Commuter rail

History
- Opened: 10 July 1929; 96 years ago

Technical
- Line length: 6.9 km (4.3 mi)
- Track gauge: 1,435 mm (4 ft 8 1/2 in)
- Minimum radius: 162 m
- Electrification: 1,500 V DC, overhead catenary
- Operating speed: 90 km/h (55 mph)

The Keihan Katano Line (京阪交野線, Keihan Katano-sen) is a 6.9 km railway line in northern Osaka Prefecture, Japan, operated by the private railway company Keihan Electric Railway. It connects Hirakatashi Station on the Keihan Main Line with Kisaichi Station.

== Operation ==
All trains stop at all stations, except as noted below. There is no through service to Keihan Main Line.

Until 15 March 2013, several trains through to Keihan Main Line were operated on weekdays, as rapid trains. They were named "Hikoboshi" and "Orihime", unlike other Keihan line rapid trains which were not named.

Rapid Express (快速急行, Kaisoku Kyūkō)
Operated weekday nights, from Nakanoshima for Kisaichi, stopped at Watanabebashi, Ōebashi and Naniwabashi on the Nakanoshima Line, then Temmabashi, Kyōbashi, Moriguchishi, Neyagawashi, Kōrien and Hirakatashi on the Keihan Main Line, and all stations on the Katano Line
Commuter Rapid Express (通勤快急, Tsūkin Kaikyū)
Operated weekday mornings, from Kisaichi for Nakanoshima, stopped at all stations on the Katano Line to Hirakatashi, then Kōrien, Neyagawashi, Kyōbashi and Temmabashi on the Keihan Main Line, then Naniwabashi, Ōebashi and Watanabebashi on the Nakanoshima Line

== Stations ==
All stations are in Osaka Prefecture.

No.	Station	Japanese	Distance	Transfers	Location
KH21	Hirakatashi	枚方市	0.0	KH Keihan Main Line	Hirakata
KH61	Miyanosaka	宮之阪	1.0		Hirakata
KH62	Hoshigaoka	星ヶ丘	1.7		Hirakata
KH63	Murano	村野	2.5		Hirakata
KH64	Kōzu	郡津	3.4		Katano
KH65	Katano-shi	交野市	4.4		Katano
KH66	Kawachi-Mori	河内森	6.1	H JR Gakkentoshi Line (Kawachi-Iwafune Station, JR-H30)	Katano
KH67	Kisaichi	私市	6.9		Katano

== Rolling stock ==
Trains on the line are formed as 4- or 5-car electric multiple unit (EMU) sets.

- 10000 series 4-car EMUs
- 13000 series 4-car EMUs (since 9 June 2012)

Former

- 1900 series 5-car EMUs
- 2600 series 4-car EMUs

== History ==
The line was built and opened by an independent railway company, Shigi-Ikoma Electric Railway (信貴生駒電鉄, Shigi Ikoma Dentetsu) in 1929. The company aimed to build a line to connect its main line, the present-day Ikoma Line, but cancelled the plan for financial reasons, and transferred the operation to Keihan. The operator was renamed Katano Electric Railway (交野電気鉄道, Katano Denki Tetsudō) in 1939, Keihanshin Express Electric Railway (京阪神急行電鉄, Keihanshin Kyūkō Dentetsu) in May 1945, and Keihan Electric Railway on 1 December 1949.

From 9 June 2012, new 13000 series 4-car EMUs were introduced on the line.
