= Hirakatashi Station =

Railway station in Hirakata, Osaka Prefecture, Japan

Hirakatashi Station 枚方市駅
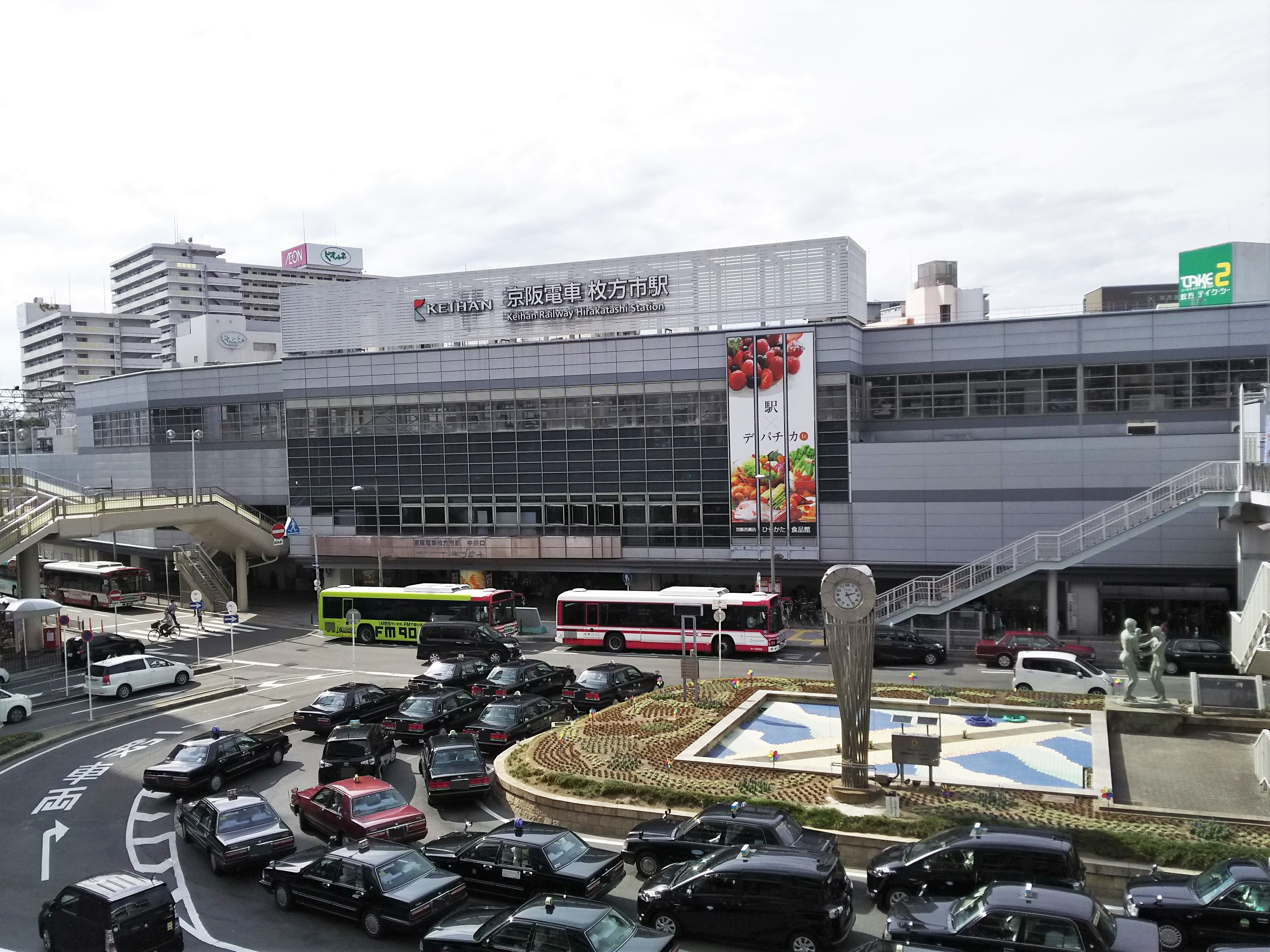
- Hirakatashi Station, September 2016

General information
- Location: 19-14 Oka-higashicho, Hirakata-shi, Osaka-fu 573-0032; Japan
- Coordinates: 34°48′58.05″N 135°38′54.31″E
- Operator: Keihan Electric Railway
- Lines: Keihan Main Line; Katano Line
- Connections: Bus terminal

Other information
- Status: Staffed
- Station code: KH21
- Website: Official website

History
- Opened: 15 April 1910; 116 years ago
- Former names: Hirakata-higashiguchi (until 1949)

Passengers
- FY2019: 96,604
Services
Preceding station	Keihan Electric Railway	Following station
Kyōbashi towards Yodoyabashi	Keihan Main Line Liner Limited Express	Kuzuha towards Sanjō
Kōrien towards Yodoyabashi	Keihan Main Line Commuter Rapid Express	Kuzuha One-way operation
Kōrien towards Yodoyabashi	Keihan Main Line Rapid Express	Kuzuha towards Sanjō
Kōrien One-way operation	Keihan Main Line Midnight Express	Kuzuha Terminus
Hirakatakōen towards Yodoyabashi	Keihan Main Line Express	Kuzuha towards Sanjō
Hirakatakōen towards Yodoyabashi	Keihan Main Line Commuter Sub Express	Gotenyama One-way operation
Hirakatakōen towards Yodoyabashi	Keihan Main Line Sub Express Semi-Express Local	Gotenyama towards Sanjō
Terminus	Katano Line	Miyanosaka towards Kisaichi
Location
- Location within Osaka Prefecture Location within Japan

Hirakatashi Station (枚方市駅, Hirakatashi-eki) is an interchange passenger railway station in located in the city of Hirakata, Osaka, Japan, operated by the private railway operator, Keihan Electric Railway. It is numbered "KH21".

== Lines ==
Hirakatashi Station is served by the Keihan Main Line and is located 21.8 km from the starting point of the line at Yodoyabashi Station. It is also a terminus of the 6.9 kilometer Keihan Katano Line to Kisaichi Station.

== Layout ==
The station has three elevated island platforms serving six tracks located on the third-floor level of the station building.

=== Platforms ===
1, 2	■ Keihan Main Line	for Chūshojima, Sanjō and Demachiyanagi
3, 4	■ Keihan Main Line	for Moriguchishi, Kyōbashi, Yodoyabashi and Nakanoshima
5	■ Keihan Katano Line	for Katanoshi and Kisaichi
5	■ Keihan Main Line	some trains starting for Moriguchishi, Kyōbashi, Yodoyabashi and Nakanoshima
6	■ Keihan Katano Line	for Katanoshi and Kisaichi

== History ==
The station opened on 15 April 1910 as Hirakata-higashiguchi Station (枚方東口駅). It was renamed Hirakatashi on 1 October 1949.

== Passenger statistics ==
In fiscal 2019, the station was used by an average of 96,604 passengers daily.

== Surrounding area ==
A redevelopment of the station complex, featuring two skyscrapers and mixed-use development, is scheduled for completion by 31 May 2024. The complex is projected to contain 40,000 m^{2} (430,000 sq ft) of commercial area.

- Hirakata City Hall
- Keihan Hirakata Station Mall (Keihan Department Store Hirakata)
- HirakataT-SEIT
- Hirakata City Arts Center( Under construction)
- Kansai Medical University
  - Kansai Medical University Hospital

== See also ==
- List of railway stations in Japan
