= Kisaichi Station =

Railway station in Katano, Osaka Prefecture, Japan

Kisaichi Station 私市駅
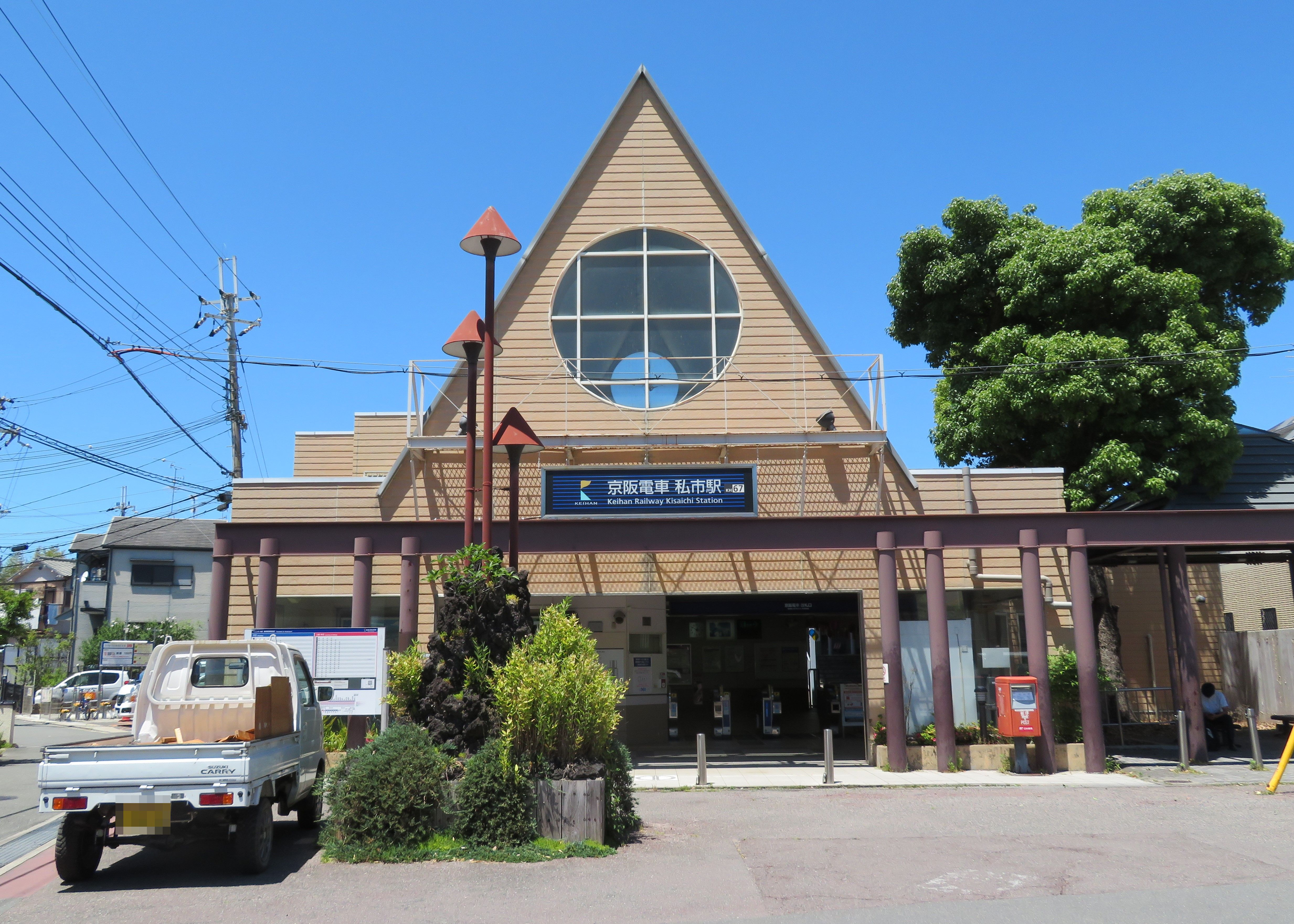
- Kisaichi Station

General information
- Location: 6-32 Kisaichi-yamate 3-chōme, Katano-shi, Osaka-fu 576-0032; Japan
- Coordinates: 34°46′04″N 135°41′11″E
- Operator: Keihan Electric Railway
- Line: Katano Line
- Distance: 6.9 km from Hirakatashi
- Platforms: 2 side platforms
- Connections: Bus stop

Other information
- Station code: KH67
- Website: Official website

History
- Opened: 10 July 1929

Passengers
- FY2019: 3,121 daily

Services
Preceding station	Keihan Electric Railway	Following station
Kawachimori towards Hirakatashi	Katano Line	Terminus
Location
- Location within Osaka Prefecture Location within Japan

Kisaichi Station (私市駅, Kisaichi-eki) is a passenger railway station in located in the city of Katano, Osaka Prefecture, Japan, operated by the private railway company Keihan Electric Railway.

== Lines ==
Kisaichi Station is a terminus of the Keihan Katano Line, and is located 6.9 kilometers from the opposing terminus of the line at Hirakatashi Station.

== Station layout ==
The station has two ground-level dead-headed side platforms.

=== Platforms ===
1, 2	■ Keihan Katano Line	for Hirakatashi, Yodoyabashi, and Demachiyanagi

== History ==
The station was opened on July 10, 1929.

== Passenger statistics ==
In fiscal 2019, the station was used by an average of 3,121 passengers daily.

== Surrounding area ==
- National Route 168
- Botanical Gardens Faculty of Science Osaka City University

== See also ==
- List of railway stations in Japan
