= Train melody =

Musical cue for an arriving or departing train

A train melody is a melody played when a train is arriving at or about to depart from a train station. In Japan, departing train melodies are arranged to invoke a feeling of relief in a train passenger after sitting down and moving with the departing train. In contrast, arriving train melodies are configured to cause alertness, such as to help travelers shake off sleepiness experienced by morning commuters.

Metro systems in several cities, including Budapest, Tokyo, Osaka, and Seoul mark train arrivals and departures with short melodies or jingles.

Systems similar to these melodies are sometimes used at freight stations to alert workers during switching or departure operations. Systems with similar purposes and functions can also be found at bus stops and amusement park attractions.

== History ==
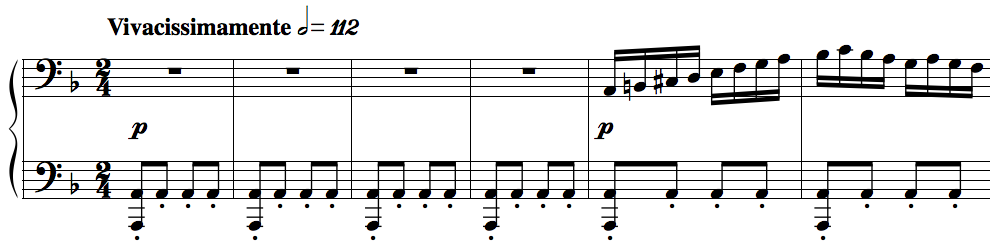
Le chemin de fer likely was the first musical representation of train departure and arrival.

In 1844, French classical pianist Charles-Valentin Alkan composed Le chemin de fer ("The Railroad"), a programmatic étude for piano designed to depict the happy journey of train passengers from departing a train station to portraying the train pulling into a second station. It is frequently cited as the first musical representation of railway travel. The joyful melody of Le chemin de fer subsequently has been celebrated as a forerunner to Arthur Honegger's orchestral work Pacific 231, which also represents a locomotive.

=== Japan ===
There are various theories regarding the origin of train melodies in Japan. A record from 1951 notes that Bungo-Taketa Station on the Hōhi Main Line, operated by the former Japanese National Railways (JNR), played the song "Kōjō no Tsuki" (荒城の月; "The Moon Over the Ruined Castle") via phonograph record during train departures. This is considered one of the earliest examples of a train melody. Notably, Rentarō Taki, the composer of the piece, was born in Taketa, making this an early form of what is now called a "local departure melody" (ご当地発車メロディ, gotōchi hassha merodī).

By the 1970s, some major private railway companies had already begun using departure melodies. Keihan Electric Railway began using one in August 1971. This melody was introduced at the suggestion of then-president Shirō Muraoka, and composed by Mutsurō Kimura, who was in charge of the departure bell system. According to Kimura, the melody was inspired by the bugle call he remembered from his days at the Naval Academy, rising in pitch with a brisk tempo to signal assembly after waking. This melody remained in use until June 2007. Before implementing the departure melody, Keihan used to play the NHK (Japan Broadcasting Corporation) time signal before their 00-minute departures of Keihan Limited Express trains at their terminal stations starting in the 1960s.

In Japan, before the widespread use of electronic sounds, a metallic bell with a shrill ringing noise, similar to that of an alarm clock, was commonly used, especially by the JNR. However, the harsh and urgent sound of these bells was unpopular among passengers.

Most of Japan's railway network was owned by the state as the JNR until 1987. The former JNR company was privatized at that time, and the network was split among six major companies in the Japan Railways Group (JR) and a range of smaller operators. Under JNR ownership, bells were used at stations to mark the arrival and departure of trains; but privatization gave local managers greater autonomy to customize their station environments. The idea of introducing more melodic alarms was developed, and this quickly spread after passengers reacted positively.

JR East began introducing departure melodies at select stations in the late 1980s, following the privatization and division of the former JNR. From the 1990s onward, they became widespread, especially at stations in the Greater Tokyo Area.

In August 1988, the departure bell was abolished at JR Chiba Station, and in March 1989, newly developed departure melodies by Yamaha were introduced at JR Shinjuku and Shibuya Stations, which together served over 1.5 million passengers daily at the time. This marked the widespread recognition of the "departure melody" concept, especially in the Tokyo area. Replacing the unpopular departure bells, the melodies were promoted as "environmentally friendly", and the Yomiuri Shimbun reported on their introduction under the headline, "Station Melodies Bring Peace of Mind". Thus, departure melodies were initially introduced as a measure to reduce noise pollution and improve passenger services.

According to Hiroshi Watanabe, a scholar of music history, early departure melodies were created strictly as notification sounds, without any intention of artistic expression. However, since the 2000s, there has been an increasing trend toward incorporating local songs and highlighting composers — emphasizing musical artistry. For example, Watanabe cites JR Hachiōji Station's departure melody "Yūyake Koyake" (夕焼け小焼け; "Sunset Grow") as a local tune, and the melodies for Keihan Electric Railway, composed and produced by Minoru Mukaiya, as an example of promoting composer identity. CDs compiling departure melodies have also been released.

These "local departure melodies" have spread across stations operated by JR and private railways throughout Japan. They often feature songs associated with local landmarks, works by local composers or singers, or themes from films, TV shows, and anime set in the area. Some melodies are also used in collaboration with nearby facilities as part of promotional campaigns, and are implemented for a limited time.

Watanabe further notes that departure melodies have become a hobby in themselves, enjoyed as independent "works" and forming a cultural phenomenon. He credits train enthusiasts—particularly so-called "ototetsu" (音鉄; "sound-train fan"), for playing a major role by sharing audio recordings on personal websites and video-sharing platforms. At the same time, he refers to incidents where JASRAC requested the takedown of such audio due to copyright infringement. Without taking a stance on the legitimacy of these actions, Watanabe interprets this shift as part of the evolution in which departure melodies, originally conceived as "gentle notification sounds" to replace harsh bells, have come to be appreciated for their musical and artistic qualities.

== Characteristics ==
Originally, the melodies used on Japan's railways sounded more like alarms. However, since the 1990s more attention has been paid to creating tunes which fulfill several criteria: clearly marking a train's arrival and departure, encouraging timely but unhurried boarding and disembarking, making passengers feel calm and relaxed, and standing out above announcements and other noise. Railway companies have established that the ideal length of a train melody, based on the typical dwell time of a train at a station, is seven seconds—so many tunes are designed to fit that length. Hundreds of different melodies—most written specifically for the railways—exist, and many stations or routes have their own characteristic tunes.

In Japan, there are two distinct concepts known as the "approach melody" (接近メロディ, sekkin merodī) and the "departure melody" (発車メロディ, hassha merodī). The approach melody refers to the music or system used primarily at railway stations to signal that a train is approaching or passing through the station. The departure melody, on the other hand, is used to indicate that a train at the station is about to depart for the next stop.

Traditional chimes or buzzers using metallic electric bells or electronic tones are referred to as "departure bells" (発車ベル, hassha beru) and are distinguished from melodic departure tunes.

Some railway vehicles are equipped with external speakers that allow departure melodies or announcements to be played from the train itself, rather than through the station's automated system, using buttons operated by train staff. In some railway lines, station-installed melodies have been completely abolished and replaced by unified "boarding encouragement tones" (乗車促進音, jōsha sokushin'on).

== Reception ==
Train melodies have proved to be popular with many people in Japan, with the term ototetsu being used to describe Japanese railfans who have a particular enthusiasm for them. Train carriage and rolling stock manufacturer Nippon Sharyo received permission to use four different train melodies owned by JR East and JR West; and in August 2002 the company released an alarm clock that plays the same lilting melodies heard on Shinkansen, Japan's high-speed railway lines. One tune is designed to invoke the relief a train passenger experiences after sitting down and moving with a departing train, and another is intended to reduce sleepiness, such as that experienced by morning commuters. By September 2002, Nippon Sharyo had sold out the first shipment of 2,000 units, priced at 5,800 yen. In view of the success of the product, the company launched a website dedicated to the clock, featuring the Shinkansen train's melodies. Other companies have manufactured keyrings and straps featuring the tunes.

There has also been criticism over the use of melodies on trains and at stations. These focus mainly on noise pollution and the tunes' contribution to it; but one author has also claimed that their use is symptomatic of a paternalistic, bureaucratic attitude towards passengers from the railway authorities, similar to the excessive use of announcements and warnings.

== Application ==
=== In Denmark ===
DSB in Denmark uses a jingle by Niels Viggo Bentzon. The jingle is a musical cryptogram of the notes D, E♭ (pronounced ess, homonymous with S) and B♭ (pronounced B, since Denmark uses German letter notation).

=== In France ===
SNCF in France uses a jingle by Michaël Boumendil:

=== In the United Kingdom ===
In the past, some National Rail stations in Great Britain used a four-tone British Rail jingle based on Jerusalem:

=== In Switzerland ===
The Swiss Federal Railways use three different jingles corresponding to the acronym of the company across three of the four national languages, transposed according to German note-naming conventions, with the final note as a chord. All three are played on the vibraphone:

SBB (German) written as "Es - B - B"

CFF (French) written as "C - F - F"

FFS (Italian) written as "F - F - Es"

In large stations, all three are used; in small ones, only the jingle corresponding to the local language. In some situations, a melody made of all three can be used:

=== In Indonesia ===
In Indonesia, most railways stations used full-hour segment of Westminster Quarters as its train melody. Upon arrival of a train, the chimes will be looped continuously until it departs from the station. Few stations are exceptions, with local folk songs acting as the train melody, mostly a kroncong song. For example, Semarang Tawang plays "Gambang Semarang" by Oey Yok Siang and Sidik Pramono, Solo Balapan plays "Bengawan Solo" by Gesang, and Yogyakarta plays "Sepasang Mata Bola" by Ismail Marzuki.

=== In Israel ===
Israel Railways in Israel formerly used a jingle on its first, old and withdrawn GEC-Alsthom "Spanish" diesel single-decker push pull trains from 1996:

=== In Singapore ===
In October 2023, train operator SMRT introduced a 3-month pilot trial of melodic chimes, created in partnership with a local not-for-profit arts company, The TENG Company. The chimes were inspired from 3 local tunes - The Chinese children's ditty "San Lun Che" (The Tricycle), the Malay folk song "Chan Mali Chan" and "Singai Naadu", the Tamil national day work composed and arranged by Shabir Sulthan. These chimes were played at train platforms at selected stations on the North–South Line, the East–West Line, and the Circle Line before a train arrives and inside trains when departing and arriving at stations along the Changi Branch of the East–West Line and from Stadium to Bayfront on the Circle Line. This pilot trial was successful and the chimes were rolled out progressively across more than 70 stations from February 2024.

One of the melodies being played, that was inspired from the Chinese children's ditty "San Lun Che".

=== In Taiwan ===
The Taipei Metro uses the following sounds as arrival music on its lines (except for the Wenhu line, due to most of its stations being elevated and close to residential buildings) including New Taipei Metro's Circular Line. In other hand, all of its lines (Wenhu, Tamsui-Xinyi, Songshan-Xindian, Zhonghe-Xinlu, Bannan) use the same transfer and terminal sound.

Tamsui-Xinyi Line Music

Songshan-Xindian Line Music

Zhonghe-Xinlu Line Music

Circular Line Music

Bannan Line

Taipei Metro Transfer Station Chime

Taipei Metro Terminal Station Chime

Taoyuan Metro's Airport MRT uses the following music and has three versions that is played during lunar new year and christmas.

Taoyuan Airport MRT Normal Chime

Taoyuan Airport MRT Lunar New Year Chime

Taoyuan Airport MRT Christmas Chime

=== In Brazil ===
In April 2026, the São Paulo Metro Line 4 (Yellow) operated by Motiva (f.k.a CCR) introduced departure melodies in all of its 11 stations, with variations depending of the time of the day and weekends.

An example of the departure melody in Butantã station:

Video on YouTube

For other stations, the melodies can be listened on the operator page:

https://trilhos.motiva.com.br/linha-4-amarela/amarela-me-motiva/

=== In Japan ===
Japan is home to many railway operators, and each company uses its own unique departure melodies (some operators do not use them at all). In some cases, instead of using a single melody or a few, certain operators employ different departure melodies at many of their stations, resulting in an enormous number of melodies in use. For example, as of July 2025, the Japanese Wikipedia entry on this topic lists over 150 "local departure melodies" (ご当地発車メロディ) used by JR East. When adding the commonly used "standard melodies" (汎用メロディ), over 400 melodies have been confirmed for JR East alone. Because the total amount of data will be so large, this section will focus on outlining the general trends of each operator rather than listing all melodies. For more comprehensive details, please refer to the corresponding Japanese Wikipedia article.

==== Departure melody ====
"Departure melody" (発車メロディ, hassha merodī) refers to the music used to indicate that a train at the station is about to depart for the next stop.

==== JR Group ====
===== JR Hokkaidō =====
JR Hokkaidō once used a unique departure melody called "Tabidachi no Kane" (旅立ちの鐘; "The Bell of Departure") at Hakodate Station. It was played exclusively for the limited express Hokuto, except during late-night hours. The melody, approximately 30 seconds long, stood out compared to those of other railway companies.

In November 1990, the standard bell was abolished due to complaints from passengers who found it noisy. However, the station's assistant manager at the time decided a departure signal was still necessary due to high passenger volume. He asked Shigeru Kitamori, a transportation supervisor at the station who was also a bandleader, to compose an alternative melody with the theme "a melody that remains in the memory of tourists". After a month of effort, the melody was completed and named "Tabidachi no Kane" by the stationmaster. It began use in December. The piece opened with chime sounds reminiscent of churches in western Hakodate and incorporated a melody played on synthesizer to evoke an exotic atmosphere. During the first year, it even ended with the horn of the Seikan Train Ferry.

However, in March 2024, following a timetable revision, all seats on the Hokuto were designated as reserved seating. As a result, the station ceased assigning platform staff to operate the melody switch, and the melody was discontinued as of March 31.

===== JR East =====
Currently, JR East uses the largest number of departure melodies among Japanese railway operators. It first introduced departure melodies at Sendai Station on November 22, 1988. At that time, however, there was no intention of widespread adoption. In the Tokyo metropolitan area, electronically synthesized bells had been in use since the late 1970s during the Japanese National Railways (JNR) era. However, these sounds were unpopular among passengers, who found them grating.

Following the discontinuation of departure bells at Chiba Station in 1988, a project led primarily by female staff members was launched. Yamaha, a well-known maker of audio equipment and musical instruments, was commissioned to develop a new departure melody system. This was introduced at Shinjuku and Shibuya Stations on March 11, 1989. The new melodies featured calming tones such as piano, bells, and harp. Considerable care was taken to ensure musical harmony across platforms—the JR section of Shinjuku Station had 12 tracks at the time (later 14)—to avoid dissonance. Today, both stations use different melodies than those originally introduced.

In the 1990s, as the initial melodies gained popularity, there was increasing momentum to introduce them at more stations. However, cost-saving systems were adopted for subsequent installations. A representative example was the use of systems by Uni-Pex (Nihon Denon), an audio equipment manufacturer, which featured original pieces as well as music by ocarina player Sōjirō, such as "Seiryū" (清流; "Clear Stream") and "Kumo o Tomo to Shite" (雲を友として; "With the Clouds as Friends"). These melodies were likely chosen to align with the company's automated announcement systems and reduce costs.

Although initially introduced at stations in the Tokyo area, Sōjirō's melodies began to be phased out starting in March 2005 due to contractual issues. By March 2014, with the removal of the melody from Takasakitonyamachi Station on the Jōetsu Line, they had disappeared entirely. At Tsuruoka Station on the Uetsu Main Line in Yamagata Prefecture, a shortened version of "Seiryū" was used as an approach melody until its use ended on September 22, 2023.

From the late 1990s, more stations began using "local departure melodies" based on songs related to the station's area, such as "Kamata Kōshin-kyoku" (蒲田行進曲; "Kamata March") at Kamata Station and the Astro Boy theme song at Takadanobaba and Niiza Stations.

In July 2010, for about one month, Shimbashi Station used the song "Whisky ga, O-suki de sho" (ウイスキーが、お好きでしょ; "You Like Whisky, Don't You?") as a departure melody. This was part of a Suntory advertisement campaign and marked the first time JR East used a departure melody for advertisement purposes.

Overall, in JR East's service area, most conventional (non-Shinkansen) train platforms and some Shinkansen platforms in the Kantō region have transitioned from traditional bells to departure melodies (excluding stations that never used bells to begin with). Only a small number of platforms still use bells. Conversely, in areas like the Nagano Branch's jurisdiction, some stations originally using departure melodies reverted to bells due to broadcasting system upgrades (e.g., Kami-Suwa and Minami-Otari Stations).

JR East's Niigata Branch had long refrained from introducing departure melodies, but began using them at Hakusan Station from September 1, 2013; at Murakami Station from March 2014; and at Niigata Station from April 15, 2018.

Some JR East trains (such as the E129, E233, E531, and E721 series) are equipped with onboard external speakers that play departure melodies. These are primarily used at stations without installed departure melodies, or when operating on interlining routes with other railway companies such as JR Central, Odakyū, or Tokyo Metro's Chiyoda Line.

Also, due to concerns that departure melodies may encourage passengers to rush onto trains, an experimental project began on August 1, 2018, on the Jōban Line (Local) between Kameari and Toride Stations. In place of station-based melodies, the trains' external speakers were used to see if they could reduce last-minute boarding. As the results proved effective, the system was officially adopted from March 16, 2019.

Moreover, in February 2025, JR East announced a policy shift, indicating that it would begin phasing out local departure melodies, using only standard melodies from train speakers.

JR East's local departure melodies are played through speakers on the platform when the conductor presses a button before departure. However, due to a shortage of labor in Japan, JR East is promoting one-person (driver-only) train operations. When a line switches to one-person train operation, conductors are no longer present, so the departure melody must be played from the train itself as described above. This system, however, cannot accommodate station-specific melodies, leading to the gradual discontinuation of local departure melodies.

On March 15, 2025, the melodies were standardized on the Nambu Line and the Jōban Line (Local). Starting in the spring of 2026, Yokohama and Negishi Lines will follow suit, and by around 2030, Saikyō, Kawagoe (between Ōmiya and Kawagoe), Keihin-Tōhoku, Chūō-Sōbu, and Yamanote Lines are also expected to adopt standardized melodies, effectively marking the end of local departure melodies in these lines.

====== Standard Departure Melodies ======
Aside from the aforementioned local melodies, the following production companies are primarily responsible for creating the standard melodies.

- Nihon Denon (Uni-Pex): A manufacturer involved since the early days, known for producing widely recognized melodies. Notable examples include "Seseragi" (せせらぎ; "Small Stream") (Ōtsuka Station), "Haru" (春; "Spring") (Ōtsuka Station), "Kōgen" (高原; "Highland") (Akabane Station), and "Sōgen" (草原; "Grasslands") (Ōhara Station). Other melodies once used—such as "Kumo o Tomo to Shite" (雲を友として; "With the Clouds as Friends"), "Seiryū" (清流; "Clear Stream"), "Shiki" (四季; "Four Seasons"), and "Kokoro" (こころ; "Heart") —were also produced by Uni-Pex.
- Toyo Media Links: Like Uni-Pex, this company has been involved since the early days and its melodies are used across a wide area of JR East's network. Especially noteworthy is "Water Crown", which is the most frequently used melody among JR East departure melodies. Other notable examples include "Gota del Vient" ("A Drop of Wind") and "Cielo Estrellado" ("Starry Sky"), used at stations such as Ōfuna.
- Gokan Kōbō: A manufacturer formed as an independent offshoot of Toyo Media Links' music division. Starting in 1994 with stations on the Nambu and Chūō Main Lines, its melodies have been adopted at several JR East stations.
- Teichiku (→ Sakurai Ongaku Kōbō): Beginning with adoption at Shinjuku Station in 1997, the company has supplied melodies to many stations, primarily in the Tokyo area. Notable examples include "Spring Box" (スプリングボックス) (Narutō Station), "Arata na Kisetsu" (新たな季節; "A New Season") (formerly used at Shinjuku Station), and an arrangement of the Astro Boy theme (Takadanobaba and Niiza Stations).
- Sound Factory: This company's royalty-free audio material was edited and used as departure melodies. In the early 2000s, it replaced Uni-Pex melodies, particularly along the Jōban Line (Local). A notable example is "Kyōkai no Mieru Eki" (教会の見える駅, Station With a View of the Church) (Nippori and Tabata Stations).
- Eiraku Electric: A long-standing supplier of broadcasting equipment since the JNR era and an early participant in melody production. It has produced many arrangements of dōyō (children's songs) and shōka (traditional students' songs), and more recently, original pieces as well. Notable melodies include "Makiba no Asa" (牧場の朝; "Morning at the Ranch") (Kuki Station), "Amaryllis" (Kuki Station), and "Seiri Bangō 5-5" (整理番号5-5; "Serial No. 5-5") (Hachinohe Station).
- Kanno Works: Previously used at stations such as Kōfu and Fuchūhommachi, this company's melodies have declined in usage since the 2010s. Most of its melodies are unnamed. Notable uses include Karuizawa Station (Shinano Railway) and Shimo-Suwa Station.
- Switch: Since the late 2000s, Switch has introduced many new melodies. In 2023, it launched the JR-SHR series. It also produces many local departure melodies. Notable examples include "Moonstone" (ムーンストーン) (Sakura Station) and "Saraba Seishun no Hikari" (さらば青春の光; "Farewell, Light of Youth") (Takasaki Station).
- Sound Forum: Since the late 2000s, this company has replaced many Uni-Pex melodies, mainly in the Tokyo metropolitan area. Notable examples include "ML-24" (formerly Shinagawa Station) and "Haru New Ver" (春NewVer; "Spring, New Ver.") (Uguisudani Station).
- Yamaha: A pioneer in departure melodies, Yamaha's early melodies were introduced at Shinjuku and Shibuya Stations around 1990. These melodies had shorter loops and differed significantly from current styles. Today, they are only used at Mito Station.
- In-house managed melodies: Since around October 2024, they were introduced starting with Yokohama Station, primarily in the Greater Tokyo Area, with the aim of replacing the existing standard departure melodies. These melodies were created with the cooperation of well-known music agencies and composers, though details about the creators have not been disclosed. For classification purposes, each melody is assigned a code in the format JRE-IKST-0xx-0x, where the "0xx" portion ranges from 001 to 023, and the "0x" portion denotes variations in tone, with values ranging from 01 to 10 (some numbers are unused). Among railfans, it is generally believed that these melodies are standardized by line and by direction, but JR East has only stated that "decisions are made internally after multifaceted consideration". In addition to these, there are also melodies whose codes are not disclosed—for example, the advertisement melodies used at Kanda and Ikebukuro Stations on the Yamanote Line, and the melodies used on platforms 1 and 2 at Tachikawa Station. The advertisement melodies are co-produced with JR East Marketing & Communications, an advertising agency under JR East.

====== Local Departure Melodies ======
As mentioned earlier, some stations use melodies based on songs associated with the region in which the station is located. The Japanese Wikipedia article lists over 150 of these "local melodies". Here are just a few examples:

- "Shōjō-ji no Tanuki-bayashi" (証城寺の狸囃子; "Tanuki Band Playing at Shōjō-ji Temple") – Kisarazu Station (Uchibō Line platforms). Used because Shōjō-ji Temple, the setting of the song, is located nearby.
- "Sakura Sakura" (さくらさくら; "Cherry Blossoms") – Komagome Station (all platforms; also used at other stations). The area is known as the birthplace of the Somei Yoshino cherry blossom variety.
- "Kibō no Wadachi" (希望の轍; "Rut of Hope") by Southern All Stars – Chigasaki Station (Tōkaidō Main Line platforms). Southern All Stars' vocalist Keisuke Kuwata is from Chigasaki.
- "Kiseki" (キセキ; "Miracle") (Shinkansen platforms) / "Tobira" (扉; "Door") (conventional line platforms) by Greeeen – Kōriyama Station. Greeeen has ties to the city.
- "Watarasebashi" (渡良瀬橋; "Watarase Bridge") by Chisato Moritaka – Ashikaga Station. The station is near Watarase Bridge, featured in the song.
- "We Love Marines" – Kaihimmakuhari Station (all platforms). The station is nearest to Chiba Marine Stadium (Zozo Marine Stadium), home of the Chiba Lotte Marines baseball team.
- "Keep On Rising" – Urawa Station (Keihin-Tōhoku Line platform). This is a cheer song for Urawa Red Diamonds, a soccer team whose hometown is Saitama.
- Astro Boy Theme Song – Takadanobaba and Niiza Stations. Takadanobaba is near the Tezuka Productions office and is also the fictional location of the Ministry of Science in the manga. Niiza is near one of Tezuka Productions' studios.
- "Zip-a-Dee-Doo-Dah" / "It's a Small World" – Maihama Station. The nearest station to Tokyo Disney Resort, including Tokyo Disneyland and Tokyo DisneySea.
- "The Third Man Theme" by Anton Karas – Ebisu Station. The song was used in Sapporo Breweries' "Yebisu Beer" TV advertisement. This melody was adopted for Ebisu since the station originated as a shipping point for Yebisu Beer from the neighbouring brewery.

====== Additional Notes ======
After JR East was established, many stations in the Tokyo area replaced their departure bells with melodies. However, Ueno Station deliberately retained bells on all platforms except for platforms 16 and 17. This decision was made out of consideration for those who had moved to Tokyo from the Tōhoku region for work during the postwar economic boom and held emotional attachments to the bell sound. Later, in 2013, departure melodies were introduced on platform 13 and, in 2015, on platforms 5–10 with the opening of the Ueno–Tokyo Line. Some melodies were also added temporarily to platforms 2 and 3.

Similarly, for nostalgic reasons, departure bells are still used at Tokyo Station's platforms 20-23 (Shinkansen platforms) and the final train on Sōbu Line (Rapid) underground platform 4, at Hon-Chiba and Nagaura Stations on the Uchibō Line, and at Minami-Shisui and Hyūga Stations on the Sōbu Main Line, particularly for trains running through from the Sōbu Line (Rapid) at night.

===== JR Central =====
At Tokyo Station, the departure melody previously used as the onboard melody for arriving or departing Nozomi trains was adopted as the platform departure melody for tracks 14 and 15 starting in late September 2008, and for tracks 16–19 starting in mid-December 2008.

JR Central established a policy in 1995, following a fatal accident caused by a rushing passenger at Mishima Station (Tōkaidō Shinkansen platform), to strictly limit the duration of departure bells and generally avoid the use of departure melodies. As a result, JR Central prohibits the use of melodies—other than bells or buzzers—as departure signals at all its stations (except Tokyo), including those on the Tōkaidō Shinkansen, and enforces this policy even at jointly used stations operated by other railway companies.

However, to encourage boarding, external melodies are used via onboard speakers in rolling stock such as the 315, 313, and KiHa 25 series trains. Additionally, between Atami and Numazu Stations, a boarding encouragement melody from the E233 series trains operated by JR East (via through service) is also played.

===== JR West =====
====== Kanazawa Branch ======
At stations along the Hokuriku Main Line equipped with automatic announcements via CTC (centralized traffic control), departure melodies are played automatically in coordination with the CTC system, without requiring station staff or train crew to operate any switches.

At Kanazawa Station, an original melody featuring the koto (a traditional musical instrument) is used.

At Fukui Station, since March 13, 2017, the melody "Yūkyū no Ichijō-dani" (悠久の一乗谷; "The Eternal Ichijō Valley") composed by Taro Hakase has been in use.

At Sabae Station, an original melody featuring the marimba has also been used since March 13, 2017.

For the Hokuriku Shinkansen, each station under JR West's jurisdiction uses its own unique melody. Starting on January 31, 2015, Nagano Station began using its melody in advance of the line's extension. From March 14, 2015, the melodies were implemented at stations between Iiyama and Kanazawa when service on this section commenced.

====== Kinki Regional Head Office ======
At Kyoto Station's conventional line platforms, melodies previously used by Seibu Railway and others were introduced when the new station building was completed in 1997, but they are no longer in use.

At Kansai Airport Station on the Kansai Airport Line, different melodies are used for Kansai Airport Rapid Services and the Haruka limited express. The melody used for Kansai Airport Rapid Service and arrival announcements was once also used in the Hokuriku region.

In the first-generation traffic management system of the Hanwa Line, the melody preceding announcements was played before departure announcements, but it was discontinued in 2013 with the update of the system.

At the new platforms of Osaka Station on the Osaka Higashi Line, from its opening on March 18, 2023, departure melodies have been used at Platforms 21 and 24 for limited express services such as Kuroshio and Haruka.

On the Osaka Loop Line, a uniform departure melody was used from the March 1999 timetable revision until December 2003 but was discontinued as it was seen as contributing to train delays.

Later, as part of the "Osaka Loop Line Renovation Project" (大阪環状線改造プロジェクト), station-specific melodies were introduced. From the March 15, 2014 timetable revision, melodies were introduced at Morinomiya, Kyōbashi, and Nishikujō Stations, followed by Osaka Station on May 1, and all other 15 stations by March 22, 2015.

Examples include:

- At Osaka Station, the melody is "Yappa Suki Yanen" (やっぱ好きやねん; "I Still Love You"), a famous song by Osaka-born singer Takajin Yashiki, sung in Osaka dialect.
- At Taishō Station, known for its large Okinawan population, the Okinawan folk song "Tinsagu nu Hana" (てぃんさぐぬ花; "Balsam Flower") is used.
- At Sakuranomiya Station, a location famous for cherry blossoms, the melody is "Sakuranbo" (さくらんぼ; "Cherry Fruits") by Ai Otsuka, a singer from Osaka.

====== Fukuchiyama Management Office ======
At Toyooka Station, a melody themed after the stork (a local symbol) is played during the departure of certain trains.

====== Sanyō Shinkansen ======
From March 9, 2016 (March 10 at Hakata Station), "The Galaxy Express 999" (銀河鉄道999, Ginga Tetsudō Surī-Nain), the theme song for the anime with the same title, has been played at every station where all trains stop (Shin-Kōbe, Okayama, Hiroshima, Kokura, and Hakata), excluding JR Central's Shin-Osaka Station. As of December 2021, this melody is also used at Himeji, Aioi, Fukuyama, and Shin-Yamaguchi Stations.

===== JR Kyūshū =====
Along the Kyūshū Shinkansen between Shin-Tosu and Kagoshima-Chūō Stations, melodies composed by Minoru Mukaiya are used. Between Shin-Tosu and Shin-Tamana as well as between Shin-Yatsushiro and Sendai Stations, original melodies are played. At Kumamoto Station, the local folk song "Otemoyan" (おてもやん; "Girl Called Otemo") is arranged as the melody, and at Kagoshima-Chūō Station, a version of the Kagoshima folk song "Ohara-bushi" (おはら節; "Ohara Song") (Note: Since this song is an old folk song, the meaning of the title is not clear today and there are many theories.) is used.

Before the full line opened, a different original melody by Mukaiya was used between Shin-Yatsushiro and Kagoshima-Chūō. At Hakata Station, "The Galaxy Express 999" melody from the Sanyō Shinkansen is used.

Since March 2012, Mukaiya's melodies have also been used on conventional line platforms at Hakata Station. Starting May 1, 2015, they were introduced at Kokura, Ōita, and Miyazaki Stations, and from July of the same year at Yufuin and Miyazaki Airport Stations. Original melodies are used at most stations, while at Miyazaki Station, a rearrangement of Duke Aces' song "Phoenix Honeymoon" (フェニックス・ハネムーン) is used.

==== Private railways, public operators, and third-sector operators ====
===== Sendai Airport Transit =====
At Sendai Airport Station, the ending theme "Kotonoha Aoba" (言の葉青葉; "Word Leaves, Blue Leaves") from Wake Up, Girls!, an anime set in Sendai, is used as the departure melody. Prior to this, "twilight" by Sakurai Ongaku Kōbō (also used by JR East) had been used. Additionally, the train cars are equipped with external speakers that play a melody ("Water Crown") upon departure.

===== Utsunomiya Light Rail (Lightline) =====
When departing from the line's initial terminal stop, a melody is played from the external speakers of the HU300 series rolling stock. All melodies were produced by the company Switch and composed by Naoya Fukushima. These have been in use since the opening of the LRT line on August 26, 2023.

===== Tōbu Railway =====
Departure melodies were first introduced at Tōbu-Utsunomiya Station in 1991. Initially, they were used only at select terminal stations, but starting around 2005, standard melodies began being used at intermediate stations as well. These melodies have been gradually introduced along the Skytree/Isesaki Line (south of Tatebayashi Station), the Nikkō Line (south of Minami-Kurihashi Station), the Urban Park Line (all stations), and the Tōjō Line (south of Ogawamachi Station).

In most cases, the melody is triggered by the conductor using a remote control on the Main Line (Skytree/Isesaki/Nikkō Lines), while on the Urban Park and Tōjō Lines, a button installed on the platform is used. At most stations, the speaker system for departure melodies is separate from the PA system used for station announcements.

====== Standard Melodies ======
The tone of Tobu's standard melodies was changed in 2020. Currently, there are four types:

- One primarily used on upbound mainline tracks
- One used on downbound mainline tracks
- One used on upbound secondary tracks
- One used on downbound secondary tracks

Before 2020, there were also two other types:

- One mainly used on the upbound Tōjō Line
- One primarily used on the Urban Park Line

This brings the total number of standard melody types used historically to six.

====== Local Departure Melodies ======
Tobu Railway also has a large variety of local melodies—over 50 are listed on the Japanese Wikipedia page. For more details, please refer to the Japanese article.

For example:

- At Ikebukuro Station on the Tōjō Line, which is near the Tokyo Metropolitan Theatre, classical music is used—including Mozart's "Divertimento in D major" and "Eine kleine Nachtmusik" ("A Little Night Music"), and Beethoven's "Symphony No. 6 'Pastoral'".
- At Tōbu-Utsunomiya Station on the Utsunomiya Line, the departure melody is "California Shower" (カリフォルニア・シャワー), composed and performed by jazz saxophonist Sadao Watanabe. This choice reflects both the fact that Watanabe is a native of Utsunomiya and the city's efforts to promote itself as a "City of Jazz".
- At Tōbu-Dōbutsu-Kōen Station on the Skytree, Isesaki, and Nikkō Lines, the departure melody is the theme song of the nearby Tobu Zoo. Similarly, at Kinugawa–Onsen Station on the Kinugawa Line, the theme song of the nearby theme park, Tobu World Square, is used. Its short version is also played at Tobu World Square Station, but only for the departure of certain limited express and other select trains.
- At Kasukabe Station on the Skytree and Urban Park Lines, theme songs from the anime Crayon Shin-chan are used, as the city of Kasukabe is the setting of the series.

===== Seibu Railway =====
Between 1994 and around 1998, approximately 50 types of melodies were used primarily at terminal stations with originating services. Today, only a few of those melodies remain in use—at stations such as Kokubunji (Tamako Line platforms), Hagiyama (Platform 1), Tamako, and Koremasa Stations. Musashi-Sakai Station on the Tamagawa Line used an older melody but has since adopted an original tune.

On other stations, melodies have been unified by line type and limited to six variations. Departure melodies have since been installed at stations that did not previously use them. In most cases, the melodies are played by pressing a button on a wireless microphone carried by the conductor. As a result, lines with one-person (driver-only) train operations do not use the newer melodies.

Some stations also use local melodies. As of the Japanese Wikipedia article, 22 local melodies are in use across 17 stations.

For example:

- At Kami-Igusa Station, which was the nearest station to the animation studio Sunrise (at the time of adoption), the theme song "Tobe! Gundam" (翔べ! ガンダム; "Fly! Gundam") from the Mobile Suit Gundam series is used.
- On the Sayama Line, which provides access to Seibu Dome (Belluna Dome), home of the Saitama Seibu Lions baseball team, support songs for the team are played at each station.

===== Tokyo Metro =====
Since its inception, most lines have continued using the "Eidan Buzzer" (営団ブザー, Eidan Buzā) —a chime originally adopted during the Teito Rapid Transit Authority (TRTA) era. However, in 1991, the Namboku Line became the first to introduce departure melodies. Later, with the opening of the Fukutoshin Line in 2008, distinct departure melodies were introduced for each platform at each station, and now other lines have also adopted melodies.

With the exception of the melodies used on the Hibiya Line before platform screen doors were installed, the duration of all songs is standardized to 7 seconds.

====== Namboku Line ======
From the opening of its first phase on November 29, 1991, the Namboku Line adopted a shared melody (with the Tōkyū Meguro Line, Toei Mita Line, and Saitama Railway) inspired by the imagery of rivers and waterfalls along the line. Originally, a chime was also played when trains arrived, but this was discontinued with the full line opening on September 26, 2000. At first, the same melody was used on both the A and B tracks, except at Shirokane-takanawa Station, which shares a platform with the Toei Mita Line, where the melodies were reversed.

All trains running on the Namboku Line were equipped with this melody as an onboard external melody. However, with the opening of through service to the Tōkyū Shin-Yokohama Line in 2023, these melodies were replaced with new ones composed by Minoru Mukaiya.

From March 10 to 13, 2015, the melodies were changed so that each station had its own unique departure tune (excluding Meguro Station, which is managed by Tōkyū).

Kōrakuen Station adopted "Take Me Out to the Ball Game" in reference to its proximity to Tokyo Dome baseball stadium.

====== Marunouchi Line ======
Departure melodies began being used in June 2008. Initially, on-board melodies installed in trains were used, with the same melody applied to both the A and B tracks. However, at Kōrakuen and Myōgadani Stations, station-installed buzzers were used instead.

Later, due to the introduction of one-person train operations, Kōrakuen Station transitioned from trial use of a station melody to a boarding encouragement melody. Myōgadani Station also trialed a station melody and then temporarily stopped the boarding melody; eventually, it adopted buzzer sounds throughout the day except in early morning and late-night hours.

Additionally, at major terminals such as Shinjuku and Ikebukuro Stations, buzzers operated by station staff are used during weekday morning rush hours.

From February 1, 2012, different departure melodies were introduced at each station during weekday rush hours, excluding Myōgadani Station and the Hōnanchō Branch Line. (Yotsuya and Ikebukuro Stations began using the melodies in March due to delayed equipment upgrades.)

With the timetable revision on July 5, 2019, which included support for 6-car trains at Hōnanchō Station, a departure chime was introduced on the Hōnanchō Branch Line (only used for 6-car trains).

The names of the onboard melodies are:

- A track (Note: Tokyo Metro refers to the directions of its lines as "A Track" (A線, Ē-sen) and "B Track" (B線, Bī-sen). While many railway operators in Japan describe the directions of their lines as "upbound" (上り, nobori) (toward Tokyo) and "downbound" (下り, kudari) (away from Tokyo), this terminology is not suitable for Tokyo Metro, which operates lines running in various directions across the city center of Tokyo.) : "Machinami Haruka" (街並みはるか; "Faraway Cityscape")
- B track: "Mai Furawā" (舞フラワー; "Fluttering Flowers")

====== Yūrakuchō Line / Fukutoshin Line ======
On the Fukutoshin Line (between Kotake-mukaihara and Shibuya Stations), departure melodies have been used since its opening.

On the Yurakucho Line (between Chikatetsu-narimasu and Shin-Kiba Stations), melodies were gradually introduced from February 2011 to February 2014 in conjunction with the installation of platform screen doors. In the section shared with the Fukutoshin Line between Chikatetsu-Narimasu and Hikawadai Stations, the same melody is used.

Wakōshi Station introduced a station melody in July 2012, but reverted to a buzzer in December of the same year. Shibuya Station uses a different melody from that used for Tōkyū's Tōyoko Line trains.

Both lines use shared onboard melodies:

- A track: "Mirai Densha" (未来電車; "Future Train")
- B track: "Rapid"

====== Ginza Line ======
Departure melodies were first introduced at Asakusa and Ueno Stations on October 30, 2012, followed by Ginza and Tameike-sannō Stations on October 31. Between June 16 and 20, 2015, melodies were expanded to stations between Tawaramachi and Kanda, and between July and November 2018, remaining stations adopted them.

At certain stations, melodies are arrangements of songs with connections to the station or surrounding area. Asakusa Station, for example, use the melody of "Hana" (花; "Flower"), a song featuring the Sumida River near the station, while Ginza Station uses the melody of "Ginza Kankan Musume" (銀座カンカン娘, "Angry Girl in Ginza"). At other stations, original melodies based on the local area concept are used.

On March 26, 2019, onboard melodies were also introduced:

- A track: "Mizu no Miyako" (水の都; "City of Water")
- B track: "Kotori no Waltz" (小鳥のワルツ; "Little Birds Waltz")

====== Tōzai Line ======
Between May and June 2015, station-specific departure melodies composed and arranged by Minoru Mukaiya were introduced (excluding Nakano Station, which is managed by JR East). While the melodies vary by station, they are structured so that, when played sequentially in the direction of travel, they form a single continuous composition. At Kudanshita Station, the song "Ōkina Tamanegi no Shita de: Haruka naru Omoi" (大きな玉ねぎの下で 〜はるかなる想い; "Under the Big Onion: Distant Feelings") by Bakufu Slump was adopted, referencing the Nippon Budokan nearby. At Nihombashi Station, the traditional folk song "O-edo Nihonbashi" (お江戸日本橋; "Edo's Nihonbashi Bridge") was chosen.

Onboard melodies were added on November 26, 2018:

- A track: "Sky Blue" (スカイブルー)
- B track: "Ageha-chō no Waltz" (アゲハ蝶のワルツ; "Swallowtail Butterfly Waltz")

====== Chiyoda Line ======
From June to September 2015, public submissions were accepted for suggestions on station melodies. As a result, at Nogizaka Station, "Kimi no Na wa Kibō" (君の名は希望; "Your Name is Hope") by Nogizaka46 was selected and introduced on March 26, 2016. The version used features a piano performance by group member Erika Ikuta.

For other stations (excluding Yoyogi-Uehara and Kita-Senju), station-specific melodies were introduced between October 6 and 27, 2018.

Onboard melodies were also implemented, with the following titles:

- A track: "Subete Koko Kara Hajimatta" (すべてここから始まった; "Everything Began Here")
- B track: "Iro-enpitsu" (色鉛筆; "Colored Pencils")

Kita-Ayase Branch Line:

- Toward Ayase: "Go Forward"
- Toward Kita-Ayase: "Kagiroi" (かぎろい; "Shimmering Haze")

====== Hibiya Line ======
From June to September 2015, public submissions were invited for station departure melodies. As a result, at Akihabara Station, "Koi Suru Fortune Cookie" (恋するフォーチュンクッキー; "Fortune Cookies in Love") by AKB48 was selected and introduced on March 31, 2016. At Ginza Station, "Ginza no Koi no Monogatari" (銀座の恋の物語; "Love Story in Ginza") by Yūjirō Ishihara & Junko Makimura was selected and introduced on April 8, 2016.

For the remaining stations (excluding Naka-Meguro and Kita-Senju), the melodies were introduced on February 7, 2020.

Additionally, Toranomon Hills Station, which opened on June 6, 2020, has had its departure melody in use since its opening.

Onboard melodies were also introduced:

- Track A: "Metro no Kyūjitsu" (メトロの休日; "Metro Holiday")
- Track B: "Nana-iro no Tsubasa" (七色の翼; "Seven-Colored Wings")

====== Hanzōmon Line ======
The departure melody was first introduced at Aoyama-itchōme Station on September 8, 2018, followed by implementation at all other stations (except Shibuya Station, managed by Tōkyū) on September 13.

At Mitsukoshimae Station, the traditional folk song "O-edo Nihonbashi" was chosen.

At Hanzōmon Station, being the nearest to the National Theatre of Japan, the melodies were based on traditional Japanese music - For trains bound for Oshiage, the melody of "Kotobuki-shiki Sanbasō" (寿式三番叟; "Kotobuki-style Sanbasō"), a traditional Sanbasō-style play in a bunraku puppet theatre, is used. For trains bound for Shibuya, "Tentsutsu" (てんつつ), a melody played in kabuki play, is used. The title "Tentsutsu" represents the sound of the shamisen (a traditional musical instrument).

These melodies were composed under the supervision of the Japan Arts Council and incorporate both traditional Japanese instruments and synthesizer sounds.

On August 24, 2019, onboard melodies were also introduced:

- Track A: "Atarashii Nakama" (新しい仲間; "New Companions")
- Track B: "Harebare To" (晴れ晴れと; "Sunny and Bright")

===== Toei Subway (Tokyo Metropolitan Bureau of Transportation) =====
On the Toei Ōedo Line, a common departure melody was introduced around 2014 alongside updates to the train approach announcements, replacing the previous buzzers and announcements.

On the Asakusa Line, from March 9, 2019, all stations except for Sengakuji Station (Keikyū Main Line platform) and Oshiage Station (managed by Keisei), began using new departure melodies.

On the Shinjuku Line, melodies were introduced progressively at stations where platform screen doors were installed starting in 2018. However, because the melody is played from the platform screen doors' speakers and not synchronized with the platform announcements, the original buzzers and announcements are still used.

At Shinjuku Station (formally under Keiō jurisdiction), Toei's departure melody is still used—unlike the Asakusa Line where stations under other operators typically use their own sounds.

On the Mita Line, melodies began being introduced at stations (excluding Meguro, Shirokanedai, and Shirokane-takanawa) starting from Shin-takashimadaira Station on February 4, 2023.

- "La candeur" ("Innocence") by Burgmüller: Asakusa Line toward Nishi-magome, Shinjuku Line toward Shinjuku, Ōedo Line toward Tochōmae, and Mita Line toward Meguro.
- "Melodie" ("Melody") by Schumann: Asakusa Line toward Oshiage, Shinjuku Line toward Motoyawata, Ōedo Line toward Hikarigaoka, and Mita Line toward Nishi-takashimadaira.

===== Toei Mita Line / Tōkyū Meguro Line / Saitama Railway =====
To ensure system consistency with the Tokyo Metro Namboku Line, the Toei Mita Line, Tōkyū Meguro Line, and Saitama Railway Line used the same departure chimes originally introduced on the Namboku Line (played via external speakers on Tōkyū trains).

The Toei Mita Line began using these chimes just before the introduction of one-person train operations in August 2000. However, at Shirokane-Takanawa and Shirokanedai Stations (managed by Tokyo Metro), the melodies were discontinued when the Namboku Line's melodies were updated.

For all other stations (excluding Meguro Station, managed by Tōkyū), the departure chimes were gradually replaced between February and March 2023 with standard melodies used on other Toei lines.

On the Meguro Line, the departure chimes were updated starting in September 2022, and all through services were updated by March 2023, followed by similar updates on the Saitama Railway Line.

At Urawa-misono Station, since November 2007, on days when Urawa Red Diamonds soccer matches are held at Saitama Stadium 2002, the team's cheer song "Keep On Rising" is used as the departure melody.

===== Tōkyū Corporation / Yokohama Minatomirai Railway =====
For the Tōyoko Line, Minatomirai Line, Den-en-toshi Line, and Ōimachi Line, departure bells are generally operated by the conductor using a remote control. On the Ōimachi Line, after the quadruple-tracking project, an original departure bell exclusive to the Ōimachi Line is used between Mizonokuchi and Futako-tamagawa to distinguish it from the Den-en-toshi Line.

On lines with one-person train operations, the Meguro Line uses external train speakers to play departure melodies, while the Ikegami Line and Tōkyū Tamagawa Line typically use an external buzzer. Following the opening of the Tōkyū Shin-Yokohama Line, the Tōyoko and Minatomirai Lines—which are also shifting to one-person train operations—switched to external buzzers at all stations except Shibuya Station and Motomachi-Chūkagai Station starting March 6, 2023.

The Minatomirai Line plays different departure melodies for upbound and downbound trains at each station except Yokohama.

In the past, the Tōyoko and Minatomirai Lines also used various local-themed melodies. For example, at Shin-Maruko and Musashi-Kosugi Stations, the cheer song of the Kawasaki Frontale soccer team—based at the nearby Todoroki Athletics Stadium—was played from December 16, 2012, to March 5, 2023.

===== Odakyū Electric Railway / Odakyū Hakone =====
Starting from the third batch of the Odakyū 2000 series, departure melodies have been installed in the 3000, 4000, and the refurbished 1000 series, as well as the Odakyū Hakone 2000 series St. Moritz, 3000 and 3100 series Allegra. Since May 2004, conductors have also been able to play these melodies through platform speakers using a PHS device. However, it is common for the melody not to be played or for only the announcement portion to be used.

Since March 26, 2016, express, commuter express, semi-express, and local services operated by JR East's E233 series (via through service) may play the external melodies built into the E233 cars. On downbound trains toward Isehara, "Water Crown" is used. On upbound trains toward stations like Yoyogi-Uehara, Ayase, Abiko and Toride (the latter two on the Jōban Line (Local)), "Gota del Vient" ("A Drop of Wind") is used.

Since March 8, 2000, Odakyū Hakone (then Hakone Tozan Railway) has used three different arranged versions of "Hakone Hachiri" (箱根八里; "8 ri to Hakone") at four major stations: Odawara, Hakone-Yumoto, Gōra, and Sōunzan. Separate arrangements are also used for the Hakone Tozan Cable Car and Hakone Tozan Buses.

===== Sagami Railway (Sōtetsu) / JR East =====
"Kids Station" is played on Platforms 1 and 2 at Hazawa Yokohama-Kokudai Station.

===== Tsukuba Express (Metropolitan Intercity Railway Company) =====
Melodies are used at all stations. There are generally dedicated melodies for Platform 1 and Platform 2, and where additional main lines exist, Platform 3 and Platform 4 melodies are also used. However, test runs before the line's opening used different melodies from those currently in use.

===== Rinkai Line (Tokyo Waterfront Area Rapid Transit) =====
The Rinkai Line generally uses the same melodies produced by Toyo Media Links as JR East.

At Tokyo Teleport Station, a specially arranged version of the theme song from the TV drama Bayside Shakedown has been used since July 2008, with full cooperation from Fuji Television. From December 7, 2012, to February 1, 2013, the theme song from the movie One Piece Film: Z was temporarily used.

At Ōimachi Station, until June 2021, the melody was changed during periods when musicals were being performed at the nearby The Shiki Theatre Natsu and Cats Theatre, operated by the Shiki Theatre Company. During the runs of productions such as Beauty and the Beast, The Little Mermaid, and Cats, the melodies used were based on the theme songs from each respective musical.

At Kokusai-Tenjijō Station, the station used the advertisement song from Zenrin's "Itsumo Navi" (map website) from August 9 to September 30, 2012, and the advertisement song for Nissin's "Spa Oh" (instant spaghetti noodles) from March 13 to June 22, 2015. Starting on September 22, 2021, to commemorate the opening of the Ariake Shiki Theatre on September 26, the melody was changed to themes from The Lion King: "Hakuna Matata" plays on the downbound platform (toward Ōsaki), and "Circle of Life" on the upbound platform (toward Shin-Kiba).

===== Tokyo Monorail =====
From June 26, 2017, to March 31, 2018, Ōi Keibajō Mae Station, adjacent to the Tokyo City Keiba (a horse racecourse), used the racecourse theme song "Twinkle Twinkle 2017".

===== Hokusō Railway =====
Since March 31, 2017, departure melodies have been used at Shin-Shibamata and Yahiro Stations. The arrangement and composition were done by Naoya Fukushima of the studio Switch. At Shin-Shibamata Station, the theme song from the film series Otoko wa Tsurai yo, set in the local area, is used. At Yahiro Station, the melody "Yagiri no Watashi" (矢切の渡し; "Yagiri Ferry"), which references the nearby traditional ferry crossing, is played.

===== Tama Toshi Monorail =====
Previously, the line used approach melodies similar to those used by JR East, but around February 2019, they were changed to music box-style versions.

===== Yokohama Municipal Subway (Yokohama City Transportation Bureau) =====
Departure melodies were introduced on the Blue Line in November 2007. For about a month after the introduction, the beginning parts of the melodies were missing. The Green Line has used these melodies since its opening.

From April 3, 2012, to February 1, 2022, the Blue Line's Kannai Station, adjacent to the Yokohama Stadium, played the Yokohama DeNA BayStars baseball team anthem "Atsuki Hoshi-tachi Yo" (熱き星たちよ; "Hot Stars").

Since July 10, 2014, the Blue Line's Shin-Yokohama Station, adjacent to the International Stadium Yokohama (Nissan Stadium), has played the Yokohama F. Marinos soccer team supporter song "We are F・Marinos".

===== Kanazawa Seaside Line (Yokohama Seaside Line) =====
To commemorate the 25th anniversary of the line's opening, all stations on the Kanazawa Seaside Line changed their departure bells and approach chimes to melodies on July 1, 2014. Five songs were introduced: the children's song "Umi" (うみ; "Sea"), the two traditional students' songs "Umi" (海; "Sea") and "Ware wa Umi no Ko" (我は海の子; "I am a Child of the Sea"), and the two songs "Tashika na Koto" (たしかなこと; "Something Certain") and "Kotoba ni Dekinai" (言葉にできない; "I Can't Put It Into Words") by Kazumasa Oda, a native of Kanazawa Ward in Yokohama.

Starting April 16, 2016, the promotional song "Seaside Line: Watashi no Okiniiri" (Seaside Line ～わたしのお気に入り～; "Seaside Line: My Favorites") was added, and on April 13, 2019, it was replaced with "Susume, Mirai e" (進め、みらいへ; "Let's Move Forward to the Future"). Each station and platform uses a different melody.

===== Kantō Railway =====
Original melodies are used at Sanuki and Ryūgasaki Stations on the Ryūgasaki Line. In the past, a variant was also used at Toride Station.

"Amaryllis" is used on the Jōsō Line at Toride, Moriya (on some trains), Mitsukaidō (downbound trains only), Shimotsuma, and Shimodate Stations. Shimotsuma and Shimodate Stations feature slightly different endings to the melody.

"Annie Laurie" is used at Mitsukaidō Station on the Jōsō Line (some upbound trains only).

===== Jōshin Electric Railway =====
At Takasaki Station, an arranged version of Teresa Teng's "Měijiǔ jiā Kāfēi" (美酒加咖啡; "Fine Wine and Coffee") plays from speakers near the ticket gates, while the First Movement of Mozart's "Symphony No. 40" plays from speakers near the waiting room.

===== Izukyū Corporation =====
On the Izu Kyūkō Line, since March 26, 2015, "Amagi-goe" (天城越え; "Crossing Amagi Pass") by Sayuri Ishikawa, a song of Mount Amagi nearby, has been used at Kawazu Station.

===== Fuji Kyūkō (Fujikyū) =====
On the Fuji Kyūkō Line, the traditional students' song "Fuji no Yama" (ふじの山; "Mount Fuji") is used at Ōtsuki, Mt. Fuji, and Kawaguchiko Stations.

===== Izuhakone Railway =====
Children's song "Kintarō" (金太郎) is used at Daiyūzan Station on the Daiyūzan Line since March 1, 2015, as the area around the station is said to be the setting for the folklore Kintarō.

"Happy Party Train" from the anime Love Live! Sunshine!! is used at Mishima Station on the Sunzu Line since December 13, 2018. This was part of a promotional effort for the theatrical release of the anime (January 4, 2019), which is set in nearby Numazu. The movie was sponsored by the Seibu Group which owns Izuhakone Railway. However, due to the aforementioned stance of JR Central (a policy of not using departure melodies in order to prevent passengers from rushing to board trains), Izuhakone Railway's melody is only used for its local trains departing between 10:00 AM and 3:00 PM with permission from JR Central.

===== Shinano Railway =====
The same melodies used by JR East (produced by Toyo Media Links, Gokan Kōbō, and Kanno Works) are used at Yashiro, Togura, Ueda, Komoro, and Karuizawa Stations.

===== Ueda Electric Railway =====
Since July 30, 2010, Ueda Station on the Bessho Line has used Tatsuro Yamashita's "Bokura no Natsu no Yume" (僕らの夏の夢; "Our Summer Dream")—the theme song from the animated film Summer Wars, which is set in the local area—as its departure and approach melody. This was part of the "Real Summer Wars" (リアルサマーウォーズ) event held in the same year to commemorate the real-life dates depicted in the film. The chorus is used for the departure melody, and the opening phrase is used for the approach melody.

===== Echigo Tokimeki Railway / Ainokaze Toyama Railway =====
At Itoigawa Station, four songs with lyrics by local poet Gyofū Sōma—"Haru yo Koi" (春よ来い; "Come Spring"), "Furusato" (ふるさと; "Hometown"), "Natsu no Kumo" (夏の雲; "Summer Clouds"), and "Katyusha no Uta" (カチューシャの唄; "Katyusha's Song")—are used in rotation depending on the season. (On the JR Ōito Line side, only a departure bell is used.)

At Takaoka Station, a melody featuring the orin, a Buddhist bell made from Takaoka's copperware craft, is used. The song title is "Koshi no Takaoka" (越の高岡; "Takaoka of Etchū Province").

At Toyama Station, since March 13, 2017, melodies from Vivaldi's "The Four Seasons" have been used; "Spring" for March–May, "Autumn" for September–November, and "Winter" for December–February. From June to August, the Tyrolian folk song "Auf der Alm" ("On the Alpine Pasture") is used.

During the JR Hokuriku Main Line era, an arrangement of the Toyama folk song "Kokiriko-bushi" (こきりこ節; "Kokiriko Song") was used from October 1989 to February 2000. (Kokiriko is a traditional musical instrument made of bamboo.) However, it was unpopular among station users due to being considered "too gloomy". With the introduction of CTC in February 2000, it was replaced by a standard melody shared across other stations with automated announcements.

===== Manyōsen =====
At Takaoka-Eki Tram Stop, the melody of orin is played when a train arrives and departs. This arrangement differs from the one used at the Ainokaze Toyama Railway's Takaoka Station.

===== Hokuriku Railroad (Hokutetsu) =====
At Hokutetsu-Kanazawa Station on the Asanogawa Line, the melody of the "Kanazawa City Anthem" (金沢市歌, Kanazawa Shika) is played, while at Uchinada Station, the "Uchinada Town Anthem" (内灘町歌, Uchinada Chōka) is used.

===== Echizen Railway =====
At Fukui Station, a harp-based melody composed by Yasuhiro Kasamatsu is played. There are two versions: one for the Katsuyama Eiheiji Line and another for the Mikuni Awara Line.

===== Enshū Railway (Entetsu) =====
At Shin-Hamamatsu Station and Nishi-Kajima Station, the melody "Windy Town" is used. This piece was composed by Minoru Mukaiya in December 2021 as part of the interactive music event "Sound Design Festival" (サウンドデザインフェスティバル) held in Hamamatsu. Inspired by the wind and musical instruments of Hamamatsu, the melody is based on the trumpet sounds of the Hamamatsu Kite Festival and incorporates the tones of piano and violin. (Hamamatsu is well known for its thriving musical instrument production industry, home to numerous musical instrument manufacturers, including Yamaha, Kawai, Roland, and Suzuki.)

Mukaiya commented, "Using the trumpet melody played during the Hamamatsu Kite Festival as a motif, I created this piece by weaving in piano and string sounds—symbolic of 'the City of Instruments'—like the wind". Initially, it was scheduled to be used at Shin-Hamamatsu Station for a limited period of one month starting November 22. However, due to its popularity, its use has continued beyond the original plan.

Previously, Shin-Hamamatsu Station used the song "Machi to Ikiru" (街と生きる; "Living with the Town"), which was created in 2014 to commemorate the 70th anniversary of Enshū Railway and served as the group song of the Entetsu Group.

===== Toyohashi Railroad (Toyotetsu) =====
Arrival melodies are used at both Shin-Toyohashi Station and Mikawa Tahara Station. Additionally, a departure melody is played at Mikawa Tahara Station.

===== Nagoya Railroad (Meitetsu) / Nagoya Municipal Subway (Nagoya City Transportation Bureau) =====
Due to the aforementioned stance of JR Central (a policy of not using departure melodies in order to prevent passengers from rushing to board trains), no departure melodies are installed at stations. Only departure bells (used by Meitetsu) and buzzers (used by the Subway) are used.

Regarding boarding encouragement melodies, Meitetsu plays onboard melodies on all lines, including the Seto Line. On Meitetsu trains from the 300 series onward, conductors can operate the melody.

In the Nagoya Municipal Subway, except for the Kamiiida Line, buzzers are mainly used at major stations such as terminals. However, approach melodies are assigned separately for each direction on each line. At Kami-Otai Station, which is managed by Meitetsu, no approach melody is used; only departure bells (both onboard and station-installed) are played.

===== Kintetsu Railway =====
Departure melodies are mainly used at limited express train stops when those trains depart. However, in Aichi and Mie Prefectures, departure bells are used instead due to JR Central's aforementioned strict policy enforcement—except at underground Kintetsu Nagoya Station, and Kashikojima Station on the Shima Line which does not run parallel to JR lines.

Unless otherwise noted, the following information is sourced from Kintetsu's official YouTube channel.

- Keihanna Line (excluding Nagata Station, managed by Osaka Metro): With the opening of the Ikoma – Gakken Nara-Tomigaoka section, melodies were also introduced to the pre-existing former Higashi-Osaka Line segment. For trains bound for Nagata and Cosmosquare, Debussy's "La Mer" ("The Sea") is played; for trains bound for Gakken Nara-Tomigaoka, Beethoven's "Symphony No. 6 'Pastoral'" is used.
- "Westminster Quarters", and "Waves of the Danube" composed by Ivanovici: Used for departures of limited express trains bound for Osaka Namba, Yunoyama-Onsen, and Yamato-Saidaiji (on special occasions only) at Kintetsu Nagoya Station (excluding Hinotori). It has been used since the 1960s. Originally, "Westminster Quarters" and "Annie Laurie" were used. Around the introduction of Vista Car III in 1978, "Annie Laurie" was replaced with "Waves of the Danube". In the early days, live bell sounds and orchestral recordings on 8-track tapes were used. However, as the tapes deteriorated over time, Kintetsu switched to PSG-generated electronic sounds in 1989. On August 10, 2016, the third version with orchestral-style arrangement was introduced. Until July 9, 2015, this combination was also used for limited express trains bound for Tsu, Matsusaka, Ujiyamada, Toba, and Kashikojima.
- "Eni o Yuite" (縁を結いて; "Making a Connection") by Tsuyoshi Domoto: From March 20, 2012, to March 19, 2017, this was used for departures of limited express trains (excluding Shimakaze and Blue Symphony) at Osaka Uehommachi (ground-level platforms only), Kintetsu Nara, Kyoto, Kashiharajingū-mae (Kashihara Line platforms only), and Osaka Abenobashi Stations. Originally planned for one year, it was extended by another year due to popularity, and remained in use until March 19, 2017. The melody starts after the announcement ends, followed by the standard departure announcement and buzzer.
- "Call Me Up" by Kana Nishino: Used from July 10, 2015, to December 26, 2016, for departures of limited express trains (excluding Shimakaze) from Kintetsu Nagoya Station bound for Tsu, Matsusaka, Ujiyamada, Toba, and Kashikojima.
- "Westminster Quarters", and "Around the World" composed by Victor Young: Since December 27, 2016, this melody has been used when limited express trains bound for Tsu, Matsusaka, Ujiyamada, Toba, and Kashikojima depart from Kintetsu Nagoya Station (excluding the Shimakaze). It was also used for several years starting in autumn 2016 as the theme song for the company's TV advertisement "The Stage is Ise-Shima" (舞台は、伊勢志摩).
- "Water Music" composed by Handel: Since March 20, 2017, this piece has been used at the departure of limited express trains (excluding the Shimakaze) from Osaka Uehommachi (ground-level platforms only), Kintetsu Nara, Kyoto, Kashiharajingū-mae (Kashihara Line platforms only), and Osaka Abenobashi Stations (excluding the Blue Symphony). The melody begins playing near the end of the announcement, and after the chime finishes, the standard departure announcement and buzzer follow before the train departs.
- Exclusive Departure Melody for the Shimakaze: For the limited express Shimakaze, which began operation on March 21, 2013, the piece "Les Perles" ("The Pearls") from 18 Études by Friedrich Burgmüller plays at departure from its originating stations: Kintetsu Nagoya Station, Osaka Namba Station, and Kashikojima Station (with a longer version at Kintetsu Nagoya Station than at the others). Since October 10, 2014, the Shimakaze service from Kyoto Station has also used this melody upon departure.
- Exclusive departure melody for the Blue Symphony: For the limited express Blue Symphony, which began operation on September 10, 2016, the second movement ("The Clock") from Haydn's "Symphony No. 101" is played at departure from its originating station, Osaka Abenobashi Station.
- Exclusive departure melody for the Hinotori: For the limited express Hinotori, which began operation on March 14, 2020, the original Kintetsu piece "Hikari no Kane" (ひかりの鐘; "Bell of Light"), composed by Yoshihisa Nishitani, is played when trains depart from their starting stations on the Osaka - Nagoya route: Kintetsu Nagoya and Osaka Namba Stations (with a longer version used at Kintetsu Nagoya).

Since September 29, 2017, Kintetsu has published a list of its departure melodies on its official website. With the exception of discontinued tracks ("Call Me Up" and "Eni o Yuite"), samples of the melodies are available for listening via official YouTube links.

===== Keihan Electric Railway =====
With the completion of ADEC (Advanced Digital Electronic Control) system updates, new departure melodies composed by Minoru Mukaiya were introduced on the Keihan Main Line, Ōtō Line, Uji Line, and Katano Line starting in June 2007, and on the Nakanoshima Line in October 2008.

There are separate melodies by direction for Limited Express (including Liner), Rapid Limited Express, and general service trains.

The melodies used on the Main and Ōtō Lines combine to form a single continuous composition.

For the Main Line and Ōtō Line:

- Rapid Limited Express melodies are used at Yodoyabashi, Temmabashi, Kyōbashi, Sanjō, and Demachiyanagi Stations.
- Limited Express melodies are also used at the above stations plus Hirakatashi, Kuzuha, Chūshojima, and Tambabashi Stations.
- General service melodies are used at the above plus Moriguchishi, Kayashima, Kōrien, Yodo, and Ryūkokudai-mae-fukakusa Stations.

Melodies are only introduced at terminal stations that fulfill certain criteria: having 2 or more island platforms and being interlocked stations. Iwashimizu-hachimangū Station used to qualify this criterion (2 platforms and 4 tracks) and the general service melodies were used. However, its tracks were reduced to 2, and the melodies were discontinued on February 28, 2025.

For Rapid Limited Express (formerly "K-Limited Express" until 2008), customized melodies were played until July 2017:

- At Kyōbashi Station (Kyoto-bound), an arrangement of "Asamoya no Kyōbashi de Norikae" (朝靄の京橋で乗り換え; "Transfer at Kyōbashi in the Morning Mist") by Rieko Miura.
- At Demachiyanagi Station, an arrangement of "Demachiyanagi Kara" (出町柳から; "From Demachiyanagi") by Rieko Miura.
- At other stations, standard limited express melodies were played.
- At Yodo Station, a special melody based on "The Marriage of Figaro" is used for temporary limited express departures.

Stations such as Nakanoshima, Kisaichi, Uji, Hirakatashi (Katano Line), and Chūshojima (Uji Line) use melodies based on the Keihan Main/Ōtō Line's themes, and even include unique melodies for special trains.

Melody titles:

- Upbound Rapid Limited Express: "KIRAYAKA" ("Bright") (Note: These melody titles are spelt in Latin alphabets in Japanese.)
- Upbound Limited Express: "MIYABI" ("Elegant")
- Upbound general: "KIRAMEKI" ("Sparkle")
- Downbound Rapid Limited Express: "HANAYAKA" ("Gorgeous")
- Downbound Limited Express: "GENKI" ("Lively")
- Downbound general: "AKOGARE" ("Aspiration")

At Kyōbashi and Temmabashi Stations (downbound), for non-Rapid Limited Express services, melodies vary by destination - "GENKI" for Yodoyabashi-bound trains, "AKOGARE" for Nakanoshima-bound trains. This distinction helps passengers identify their destination, since all train types stop at each station west of Kyōbashi.

A CD titled Keihan Densha Hassha Melody Collection (京阪電車発車メロディcollection; "Keihan Train Departure Melody Collection") featuring Mukaiya's compositions was released in November 2008, with a 2019 version currently available.

Previously, for limited express trains, a children's song "Ushiwakamaru" (牛若丸) was used, as it was about the meeting between Minamoto no Yoshitsune (Ushiwakamaru) and Musashibō Benkei at Gojō Bridge in Kyoto. (Before 1995, "The Marriage of Figaro" was used.) For other trains, original melodies composed for the 1971 system debut were played, typically only at terminal stations.

===== Eizan Electric Railway (Eiden) =====
At Demachiyanagi Station, a melody is used. Previously, the Kurama Line used a melody while the Eizan Main Line used a buzzer, but now both lines use the same melody.

===== Keifuku Electric Railroad (Randen) =====
On the Randen tram lines, since April 2008, a melody composed by Hiroki Okano has been used at Shijō-Ōmiya, Katabiranotsuji, Arashiyama, and Kitano-Hakubaichō Tram Stops.

===== Hankyū Railway =====
At Osaka-Umeda Station, each of the Kōbe Main, Takarazuka Main, and Kyoto Main Lines uses a melody representing its respective destination (approx. 15 seconds long, with about 9 seconds of melody). At the time of the last train, the melody is extended until all passengers have cleared the ticket gates, sometimes playing for over a minute. From around 11:40 p.m., a background BGM—an original arrangement of "The Third Man Theme"—plays throughout the station to notify passengers that last trains for each destination are about to depart, accompanied by an announcement.

At Jūsō Station, the melody was introduced on February 2, 2019, in conjunction with the start of platform screen door operations on the Takarazuka Main Line platform. It was composed by Shigeru Kishida of the band Quruli.

At Takarazuka Station, from March 21, 2014, "Sumire no Hana Saku Koro" (すみれの花咲く頃; When the Violet Flowers Bloom) (Note: This song is the Japanese version of "Wenn der weiße Flieder wieder blüht" ("When the White Lilacs Bloom Again"), a song originally used in a German revue. The cover song was featured in the Takarazuka Revue and has come to be recognized in Japan as a symbolic song of the Takarazuka Revue.) was adopted for the Takarazuka Main Line platforms to commemorate the 100th anniversary of the Takarazuka Revue, and the theme song of Astro Boy, a famous work by Osamu Tezuka who had strong ties to Takarazuka, was adopted for the Imazu Line platforms. Both melodies are 12-second synthesizer arrangements.

At Kōsoku Kōbe and Shinkaichi Stations, around the time of the Kōbe Main Line timetable revision in March 2016, a shared departure melody used by Hanshin was adopted. The sequence is: pre-departure melody → announcement → departure chime (same type used at Hanshin's major intermediate stations).

===== Nose Electric Railway (Noseden) =====
From July 22, 2010, to July 31, 2024, Kawanishi-Noseguchi Station used "Kinta-kun no Theme Song" (きんたくんのテーマソング; "Kinta-kun's Theme Song"), a song of the city mascot of Kawanishi. The tone varied by platform.

As of August 1, 2024, commemorating the 70th anniversary of Kawanishi's incorporation as a city, a new melody "Kono Machi wa Watashi no Takaramono" (この街は私の宝物; "This Town is My Treasure") composed by Kana Uemura has been introduced. Like the previous melody, the sound varies by platform.

At Myōkenguchi Station, the image song "Polaris: Hokkyokusei ni Mukatte" (Polaris 〜北極星に向かって〜; "Polaris: Towards the North Star") has been used since 2017.

===== Hanshin Electric Railway =====
Melodies have been used since 1990, originally composed by Tatsuo Nishiura and later replaced in January 2009 by compositions from Minoru Mukaiya. Approaching melodies were also updated from Nishiura's to Mukaiya's.

Pre-departure and departure melodies are used at Osaka-Umeda, Kōbe-Sannomiya, Ōishi (track 4), Mukogawa (the Mukogawa Line platform), and Mukogawadanchimae Stations. At Motomachi, Kōsoku Kōbe (from March 2016), Shinkaichi (from the same period), and Sakuragawa Stations, only the pre-departure melody is used.

At other stations, bells (electronic tones) are manually operated via platform switches or handheld wireless mics.

Before the Hanshin Namba Line opened, the melodies were also used at former Nishi-Osaka Line platforms (track 3) at Amagasaki and at Nishikujō Stations.

===== Nankai Electric Railway =====
On the Nankai Semboku Line (then Semboku Rapid Railway), melodies were first used at Izumi-Chūō and Kōmyōike Stations upon the line's extension on April 1, 1995.

From March 26, 2022, new melodies composed by Minoru Mukaiya were introduced at track 2 of Nakamozu and all platforms from Fukai to Izumi-Chūō. Similar to Keihan, these melodies form a continuous piece when connected.

===== Kyoto Municipal Subway (Kyoto Municipal Transportation Bureau) =====
Melodies are used on both the Tōzai and Karasuma Lines (since March 2011).

They feature traditional Kyoto sounds like shamisen and tsuzumi drums and were composed by Sakurai Ongaku Kōbō.

Misasagi Station has a dedicated melody for the platform toward the Keihan Keishin Line.

===== Osaka Metro (formerly Osaka Municipal Subway) =====
Except for the Chūō and Nagahori Tsurumi-ryokuchi Lines, six other subway lines have used melodies since around 1990. upbound lines feature ascending melodies, while downbound lines feature descending melodies. Initially, the same melody was planned for both directions, but separate melodies were later created due to difficulty distinguishing between directions when stopped.

The Nagahori Tsurumi-ryokuchi Line adopted a unique melody from the beginning, different from other lines, reflecting its role as an access line to the Expo '90. By contrast, the Imazatosuji Line, despite being a similar linear motor metro, uses the standard melody.

Originally, the Chūō Line used the common melody, but from November 13, 2024, a new melody was introduced as part of its designation as an access route for Expo 2025. The composer is sound designer Yoshihisa Nishitani.

The Nankō Port Town Line (New Tram) continues to use a departure bell.

===== Kita-Osaka Kyūkō Railway (Kitakyū) =====
At Minoh-kayano Station, different melodies play at the beginning of the departure announcement depending on the season - Spring: "Frühlings Lied" ("Spring Song"), Summer: "L'Arlésienne" ("The Arlesian Woman"), Autumn: "Autumn Leaves", Winter: "Takibi" (たきび; "Firewood"). The last train toward Nakamozu uses "Auld Lang Syne". A bell or buzzer follows the announcement. Before the extension to Minoh-kayano on March 23, 2024, this setup was used at Senri-Chūō Station.

===== Kōbe New Transit =====
The Port Island Line (Portliner) uses the same melody as that used at Seibu Railway's Seibu-Chichibu Station and JR West's Kyoto Station, with different timbres.

===== Kōbe Municipal Subway (Kōbe Municipal Transportation Bureau) =====
On the Seishin-Yamate Line, departure melodies were gradually introduced starting in January 2020 alongside updated announcements.

On the Kaigan Line, a departure chime has been used since the line opened in July 2001.

===== Sanyō Electric Railway =====
Since May 2012, melodies composed by Hiroshi Shiozuka have been introduced at several major and intermediate stations.

===== Hiroshima Rapid Transit (Astram Line) =====
After the opening of Shin-Hakushima Station, both the approach melody and the pre-departure melody at terminus stations were updated to a second-generation version.

===== Hiroshima Electric Railway (Hiroden) =====
Departure melodies are used at Hiroshima Port, Yokogawa Station, and Hiroshima Station Tram Stops. At Hiroshima Port Stop, different melodies are played depending on the platform. At Hiroshima Station and Yokogawa Station Stops, the same melody is used.

===== Takamatsu-Kotohira Electric Railroad (Kotoden) =====
At Kawaramachi Station, a departure melody is used only when upbound trains bound for Takamatsu-Chikkō Station depart from platforms 1 and 3. For other platforms or destinations, a standard electronic bell used at other stations is employed. Since March 2018, Quruli's "Kotokoto Kotoden" (コトコト琴電; "Kotoden Thumps Along") has been used. Before that, "Ob-La-Di, Ob-La-Da" was used on platform 1, and "It's a Small World" on platform 3.

===== Iyo Railway (Iyotetsu) =====
At Matsuyama City, Takahama, Gunchū Port, and Yokogawara Stations, a melody titled "Rhythm" (リズム), composed by the company's president Ichirō Shimizu, is used.

===== Nishi-Nippon Railroad (Nishitetsu) =====
On the Tenjin Ōmuta Line, departure melodies were introduced starting in 2013 at Futsukaichi and Chikushi Stations, as part of upgrades to passenger information systems and automated station announcements. They were later introduced at Nishitetsu Fukuoka (Tenjin), Ōhashi, Kasugabaru, Nishitetsu Kurume, Nishitetsu Yanagawa, and Ōmuta Stations. For trains bound for Nishitetsu Fukuoka (Tenjin), the same melody used at intermediate stations on the Tōbu Isesaki and Tōjō Lines is used. For trains bound for Ōmuta or Dazaifu, a different generic melody is employed.

At some major stations not listed above, 2-tone or 4-tone chimes are used instead.

At Nishitetsu Fukuoka (Tenjin) Station, from August 11 to September 16, 2018, Namie Amuro's song "Hero" was used as a special departure melody.

===== Okinawa Urban Monorail (Yui Rail) =====
Each station uses a different melody of traditional Okinawan folk songs. For example, at Asato Station, the medoly of "Asatoya Yunta" (安里屋ユンタ; "The Work Song for the Girl Asato") is used. At Shuri Station, "Akata Sundunchi" (赤田首里殿内; "In the Shuri Castle, Akata Village") is used.

In contrast, onboard melodies are standardized across the line.

==== Approach melodies ====
"Approach melody" (接近メロディ, sekkin merodī) refers to audio signals or music used at train stations to notify passengers that a train is approaching.

There are several patterns of approach melodies. For example, in western Japan, especially among JR West and other Kansai-based railways, different types of melodies are distinguished by function, such as "pre-arrival melody" (予告メロディ, yokoku merodī), "entry melody" (入線メロディ, nyūsen merodī) (also used for passing trains), and "arrival melody" (到着メロディ, tōchaku merodī) (played after the train has stopped). These generally fall into the following five usage types:

- Played at the beginning of automated announcements.
- Continues playing after the announcement until the train arrives.
- Automatically starts 1–2 minutes before arrival and continues until the train arrives.
- Played once before the announcement, then continues after it until arrival.
- Played once simultaneously with the announcement.

==== JR Group ====
===== JR Hokkaidō =====
At Ikeda Station on the Nemuro Main Line, melodies from Dreams Come True—"Haretara Ii ne" (晴れたらいいね; "I Hope It Will Be Sunny") and "Almost Home", featuring local member Miwa Yoshida—are used during ticket gate operations.

At Ōnuma-Kōen Station on the Hakodate Main Line, "Sen no Kaze ni Natte" (千の風になって; "Becoming Thousand Winds"), a song set in the local area, is played as a gate melody in the form of a roughly 10-minute medley.

Different chime patterns are used across stations: three-tone chimes at major stations like Sapporo and Hakodate, two-tone chimes within the PTC-controlled Sapporo area, four-tone chimes at stations like Noboribetsu and Tōya, and five-tone chimes at Obihiro and Kushiro. The Hokkaidō Shinkansen has newly introduced its own approach melodies.

At the now-defunct Rumoi Station on the former Rumoi Main Line, the melody "Yūhi" (夕陽; "Sunset") was played at the ticket gates until the station's closure on March 31, 2023.

===== JR East =====
Before ATOS (Advanced Train Operation System) was introduced, the Yamanote Line, Keihin-Tōhoku Line, and Chūō-Sōbu Line each had their own unique approach melodies. These are generally no longer used, but occasionally reappear during system malfunctions. For example, at Suidōbashi Station in the early morning or late night, the old Chūō-Sōbu Line melody was temporarily reinstated to emphasize trains terminating at Tokyo, but this was discontinued when ATOS was updated.

The current ATOS melody is an arrangement of the Yamanote Line's former approach melody. In 2010, some stations on the Sotobō Line (like Katsuura and Ōhara) began using the same melody as the pre-ATOS Yamanote Line.

A variety of chimes are used at stations and lines not covered by ATOS.

Some stations in the Tokyo area also play melodies after approach announcements to enhance safety; since these are sourced from royalty-free music, the same tunes may be found on private railway lines.

At stations such as Kikuna and Machida on the Yokohama Line, Shin-Kiba on the Keiyō Line, and Hino on the Chūō Line (Rapid), these melodies were trialed.

At certain stations like Hashimoto (Yokohama Line), etc., dedicated equipment emits melodies such as "Mary Had a Little Lamb" in sync with LED displays, separate from standard approach announcements.

At Kitakami Station on the Tōhoku Main Line, "Spring Box" (スプリングボックス) by Sakurai Ongaku Kōbō (also used at Ikebukuro and Akihabara) is played. At Karuizawa Station on the Hokuriku Shinkansen, "Umi no Eki" (海の駅; "Sea Station") by Sound Factory is used.

In the Nagano Branch, some stations play short repeated clips of "It's a Small World" or "Happy Birthday to You", repeated three times as the approach melody.

====== Niigata Branch ======
At Niitsu Station on the Shin'etsu Main Line, the song "Anata ni Deaeta Kono Machi de: Niitsu no Uta" (あなたに出逢えたこの町で〜にいつのうた; "In This Town Where I Met You: Niitsu's Song") plays on platform 1; steam train whistle sounds play on platforms 2 and 4; and "Hitsuji-gusa" (ひつじ草; "Sheep Grass") plays on platforms 3 and 5.

At Kasashima Station (Shin'etsu Main Line) and Ojiya Station (Jōetsu Line), approach melodies are also used: "Kuckuck, Kuckuck, ruft's aus dem Wald" ("Cuckoo, Cuckoo, Calls From the Forest") and "Mura no Kajiya" (村の鍛冶屋; "Village Blacksmith") (from Echigo Tokimeki Railway) at Kasashima, and "Maiden's Prayer" and "Für Elise" ("For Elise") at Ojiya.

At Tsuruoka Station on the Uetsu Main Line, the melody "Seiryū" (清流; "Clear Stream")—once widely used as a departure melody in the Tokyo metropolitan area—was played until September 22, 2023.

At Sakata Station, "Yoake no Uta" (夜明けのうた; "Song of the Dawn") by chanson singer Yōko Kishi, who was born in Sakata, was played until September 3, 2024.

===== JR Central =====
At Nagoya Station's conventional (non-Shinkansen) line platforms, and at stations on the Chūō Main Line that use announcement voices by Eiji Tsuda and Keiko Sakiyama, the same approach melody used for upbound trains on the Tōbu Skytree Line is employed.

Beginning in November 2014, these melodies were introduced to the Tōkaidō Main Line in the Nagoya area (between Toyohashi and Ōgaki), and later to the Shizuoka area in November 2017.

They are also used on other JR Central lines such as the Kansai Main Line.

===== JR West =====
On the JR Kōbe Line, the Sanyō Main Line east of Aioi Station, and the Akō Line east of Banshū-Akō Station, the original approach melody "Sazanami" (さざなみ; "Ripples") is played after the preliminary melody and train information announcement when a train is approaching.

At stations such as Kōshienguchi, Nishi-Akashi, and Himeji-Bessho, the melody "Mary Had a Little Lamb" is also emitted from the approach indicator in addition to the standard sequence.

At Uozumi, Kakogawa, and Himeji Stations, "Mary Had a Little Lamb" and the chorus of "Camptown Races" are played through the approach indicators.

At Sakura Shukugawa Station, the chorus of "Sakura" (桜; "Cherry Blossoms") by the duo Kobukuro was once used, but it was replaced by "Sazanami" due to the end of a promotional campaign and copyright considerations. Since March 12, 2015, the melody was further updated to a new, higher-quality version in line with other stations on the JR Kōbe Line.

Sumakaihinkōen Station once used the children's song "Kamome no Suihei-san" (かもめの水兵さん; "Seagull Sailor") but it too was replaced by the revised "Sazanami" melody on July 16, 2014. This revised version was then extended on March 12, 2015, to all Kōbe Line stations, Aioi and Kamigōri Stations on the Sanyō Main Line, and Banshū-Akō Station on the Akō Line.

At Osaka Station (on all platforms including the JR Kōbe and JR Kyoto Lines), and throughout the Osaka Loop, Yamatoji, JR Yumesaki, Osaka Higashi, JR Takarazuka (Tsukaguchi – Shin-Sanda), JR Tōzai (except Amagasaki), and the Gakkentoshi Lines, a common approach melody is used.

Though the base melody is the same, there are slight differences in pitch and tempo between announcements voiced by Eiji Tsuda and Keiko Sakiyama (used on Osaka Loop and Yamatoji Lines) and those voiced by Akira Murayama and Keiko Yoshii (used on JR Takarazuka, JR Tōzai, and Gakkentoshi Lines). For example, the former shortens phrases within the melody. (The revised quality version is an exception.)

Additionally, separate melodies are used depending on whether the train stops or passes through.

Before the full deployment of the traffic management system on the Osaka Higashi Line, a unique approach melody was used.

From March 12 to 13, 2015, the melody at Osaka Station and stations using the Osaka Loop/Yamatoji Line traffic management system was upgraded (except Tennōji, which was updated earlier on February 24, 2015). Then on March 7, 2017, stations on the JR Takarazuka, JR Tōzai, and Gakkentoshi Lines followed suit.

At Kyoto Station, the same melody previously used at Seibu Railway's Seibu-Chichibu Station is employed as the approach melody. Since March 12, 2015, this was updated to a higher-quality version and extended to all stations on the Biwako Line (except Sakata and Tamura) and all stations on the JR Kyoto Line (except Shimamoto).

Shimamoto Station uses "Ningen Mina Kyōdai - Yoru ga Kuru" (人間みな兄弟〜夜がくる; "All Humans Are Brothers - Night Comes"), composed by Asei Kobayashi.

Since 2011, an original approach melody (referred to hereafter as the "JR West standard melody") has been used at stations from Hirono to Sasayamaguchi on the JR Takarazuka Line. This melody has gradually been introduced at lines not covered by the Kansai area traffic management system, and in some parts of the Okayama area.

On the Hanwa Line, approach melodies have been used at all stations since 2000, with separate tunes for stopping and non-stop trains.

At Kansai Airport Station on the Kansai Airport Line, a unique melody is played, which differs between Kansai Airport Rapid and Limited Express Haruka.

At Aburahi Station on the Kusatsu Line, the approach indicator used to play "Haru ga Kira" (春が来た; "Spring Has Come") with an organ tone, but following a system upgrade in March 2020, it was replaced with a higher-pitched version of the JR West standard melody.

====== Okayama Branch ======
In the major stations of Okayama Branch Area, local children's songs and students' songs are played alongside automated announcements as approach melodies. Since 2012, some stations (like Konkō and Matsunaga) have phased these out in favor of the JR West standard melody, or have followed up the local melody with the JR West standard melody (e.g., at Okayama and Tsuyama Stations).

Since the introduction of a traffic management system on the Sanyō Main Line between Seto and Itozaki in 2016, stations in this section now interrupt the local melody and immediately follow it with the JR West standard melody after the announcement ends.

====== Hiroshima Branch ======
In the Hiroshima Branch Area, original approach melodies (hereafter referred to as Hiroshima standard melodies) are widely used. These vary by station: some play the JR West standard melody followed by a short approach announcement and the Hiroshima standard melody; others skip the first part and go straight into the Hiroshima standard melody after the announcement.

Melodies such as "Seseragi" (せせらぎ; "Small Stream") and "Haru" (春; "Spring"), also found in JR East's departure melody lineup, were once used but have since been replaced by JR West standard and Hiroshima standard melodies. Currently, both directions at Hiroshima Station use the same melody (Platform 2 for downbound and Platform 4 for upbound).

Some routes, like the Geibi Line, use custom melodies distinct from others.

At major stations other than Hiroshima, the Hiroshima Branch's own automated announcement systems use slightly different instrumental versions of the Hiroshima standard melody.

Around March 8, 2016, Ube-Shinkawa and Kotoshiba Stations on the Ube Line introduced the same melody used at Yamaguchi Station on the Yamaguchi Line. The JR West standard melody is not used on the Ube Line.

====== Yonago Branch ======
In the Yonago Branch Area, original melodies are used at some stations on the San'in Main and Inbi Lines.

These melodies are also played at Matsudai Station on Hokuetsu Express's Hokuhoku Line during train passage.

Since March 2019, the same melody has been used at Shimonoseki Station, and since 2021 at Minami-Iwakuni and Daidō Stations in the Hiroshima Branch Area. However, Shimonoseki Station replaced it after just one year with a dedicated custom melody.

====== Kanazawa Branch ======
In the Kanazawa Branch Area (small to medium-sized stations), electronic versions of children's songs or classical pieces are played through approach indicators. (Similarly, the electronic sound of "Annie Laurie" was played at Terashō Station on the Kusatsu Line in Kansai region, but is no longer in use.)

At major stations with automated announcements (except Kanazawa), a shortened version of the approach melody used at Kanazawa Station is played after the two-tone chime and announcement. (Until March 2015, this was the same melody as that used for regular trains at Kansai Airport Station.)

====== Sanyō Shinkansen ======
Since February 2015, at all Sanyō Shinkansen stations (excluding Shin-Osaka, which is under JR Central's jurisdiction), a rearranged version of the melody once used for the Hikari and Kodama trains until autumn 2003 has been used as the approach melody.

Since the Hokuriku Shinkansen opened west of Itoigawa Station in March that year, melodies based on "Tetsudō Shōka" (鉄道唱歌; "Railway Song") have also been adopted as approach melodies.

====== Local Melodies ======
Since 2015, JR West has not allowed changes to approach melodies for safety reasons and does not permit stations already using original melodies to switch to different ones. However, the use of original melodies for purposes other than train approach—such as departure melodies—is still permitted. As a result, since 2015, it has become rare for stations to adopt local melodies as approach melodies. Instead, these melodies are used as arrival melodies that play after the train has stopped, or they are used in conjunction with the standard melody described earlier.

In the Japanese version of this Wikipedia article, 28 different local melodies are listed. For example, at Kinosaki Onsen Station, a well-known hot spring destination, the melody "Ii Yu da na" (いい湯だな; "It's a Nice Bath") is played except during winter. In winter, the melody changes to "Nagisa ni Matsuwaru Et Cetera" (渚にまつわるエトセトラ; "Et Cetera Related to the Beach"), a song known for its lyrics about going to eat crab—fitting since snow crab is a specialty of Kinosaki in winter. At Kure Station, "Space Battleship Yamato" (宇宙戦艦ヤマト, Uchū Senkan Yamato) is used because the city of Kure is where the battleship Yamato was constructed (at the former Kure Naval Arsenal, now Japan Marine United's Kure shipyard), and near the station is the Yamato Museum, whose honorary director is Leiji Matsumoto, director of the anime Space Battleship Yamato.

===== JR Shikoku =====
At major stations along the Yosan Line (such as Takamatsu, Sakaide, Utazu, Marugame, Tadotsu, Kan'onji, and Imabari), the melody "Seto no Hanayome" (瀬戸の花嫁; "Bride from Seto") is played (the same melody used by JR West's Okayama Branch).

At Kōchi Station, the theme song from the TV anime Soreike! Anpanman—created by Takashi Yanase from Kami, Kōchi—is played. (It shares the same arrangement as the onboard chime.)

At Matsuyama Station, since 2011, an arrangement of "Kono Machi de" (この街で; "In This Town"), composed by Man Arai, has been used as part of a partnership agreement with Matsuyama City. Since May 2015, as part of the "Setouchi-Matsuyama" (瀬戸内・松山) initiative between Matsuyama City and JR Shikoku, the melody "Haru ya Mukashi" (春や昔; "That Spring is Now a Thing of the Past"), which sets a haiku by Shiki Masaoka to music composed by Arai, has been adopted.

At Iyo-Saijō Station, since March 2015, an arrangement of "Sen no Kaze ni Natte" (千の風になって; "Becoming Thousand Winds") sung by tenor Masafumi Akikawa, who hails from Saijō, has been played.

At Tokushima Station, since August 5, 2016, the local Awa Dance melody "Awa Yoshikono" (阿波よしこの) has been used. "Yoshikono" refers to a traditional rhythm.

At Kotohira Station, since April 27, 2017, the folk song "Konpira Funefune" (こんぴら船々; "Ships to Konpira"), which is associated with the nearby Kotohira-gū Shrine, has been played.

===== JR Kyūshū =====
The melodies are generally categorized into two types: those paired with departure melodies under the same concept—many of which were composed by Minoru Mukaiya—and those used only as approach melodies.

The standalone approach melodies often feature local songs connected to the area.

At stations like Nishiyashiki and Chikuzen-Daibu, a melody previously used at stations in Yamaguchi Prefecture under JR West's Hiroshima Branch (such as Ube and Onoda Stations) is played, although it is cut off partway.

In the Japanese version of the Wikipedia article, 19 different melodies are listed for JR Kyūshū. For example, at Yōkoku Station, located near the Sanrio theme park Harmonyland, "ARIGATO HUG YOU" ("Thank You, Hug You"), a Hello Kitty song, is used.

At Bungo-Taketa Station, "Kōjō no Tsuki" (荒城の月; "The Moon Over the Ruined Castle") is played, a song inspired by the nearby ruins of Oka Castle. This has been in use since May 14, 1951, and is considered the oldest known train melody in Japan based on available records.

==== Private railways, public operators, and third-sector operators ====
===== Sapporo Municipal Subway (Sapporo City Transportation Bureau) =====
From February 4 to February 6, 2019, an arrangement of "Niji to Yuki no Ballad" (虹と雪のバラード; "Ballad of Rainbow and Snow") began to be used as the approach melody at 26 stations on the Namboku, Tōzai, and Tōhō Lines. This song was the theme of the 1972 Sapporo Winter Olympics and was introduced to raise enthusiasm in Sapporo for its bid to host the 2030 Winter Olympics. However, following the suspension of the bid campaign, use of the melody was gradually discontinued between March 14 and 16, 2024.

===== Hakodate City Tram (Hakodate City Tram Department) =====
Since January 2010, a prelude arrangement of "Hakodate Sanka" (はこだて賛歌; "Hakodate Anthem") has been used as the approach melody at several tram stops, including Yunokawa, Goryōkaku-Kōen-Mae, Matsukaze-Chō, Hakodate-Ekimae, and Jūjigai.

===== Saitama New Urban Transit Ina Line (New Shuttle) =====
Since June 29, 2013, "The Galaxy Express 999" (銀河鉄道999, Ginga Tetsudō Surī-Nain), performed by the brass band of Ina Gakuen Comprehensive Upper Secondary School located along the line, has been used as the approach melody at Ōmiya and Tetsudō-Hakubutsukan Stations.

===== Toei Subway (Tokyo Metropolitan Bureau of Transportation) =====
At Jimbōchō Station on the Toei Mita Line, adjacent to the famous Jimbōchō Book Town, the TV advertisement song "Pikka-pika no Ichi-nen-sei" (ピッカピカの一年生; "Brand New First Grade") has been used as the approach melody since February 21, 2025, in celebration of the 100th anniversary of the children's magazine Shōgaku Ichinensei.

===== Tōbu Railway =====
Since July 24, 2015, the song "Watarasebashi" (渡良瀬橋; "Watarase Bridge") by Chisato Moritaka has been used as the approach melody at Ashikagashi Station on the Isesaki Line, as the station is the closest to the bridge referenced in the song. Additionally, at Tōbu World Square Station on the Kinugawa Line, which opened on July 22, 2017, the approach melody is a unique arrangement of "Tobu World Square" (東武ワールドスクウェア) by Akane Oda, a theme song for the adjacent theme park.

===== Keisei Electric Railway =====
Since March 1, 2019, the theme song "Moete Hero" (燃えてヒーロー; "Burning Hero") from the anime Captain Tsubasa has been used at Yotsugi Station on the Oshiage Line. On July 23, 2019, the same melody was introduced at Keisei Tateishi Station as a limited-time melody in collaboration with Takara Tomy. Although it was initially scheduled for one year, use of the melody was suspended in mid-October after a fatal accident involving a visually impaired person at the station, which lacked platform screen doors.

===== Odakyū Electric Railway =====
The Japanese Wikipedia article lists 15 melodies across 10 stations of Odakyū.

For example, at Soshigaya-Ōkura Station—near the headquarters of Tsuburaya Productions—the theme of Ultraseven is used on Platform 1, and the Ultraman theme is used on Platform 2. At Noborito and Mukōgaoka-Yūen Stations, which are the nearest stations to the Fujiko F. Fujio Museum, themes from anime based on Fujiko F. Fujio's works (Perman, Doraemon, and Kiteretsu Daihyakka) are played on each platform.

===== Keiō Corporation =====
Several major stations have local melodies. The Japanese Wikipedia article lists 28 songs across 21 stations.

For instance, at Meidaimae Station, which is the nearest to Meiji University's Izumi Campus, the "Meiji University Anthem" (明治大学校歌, Meiji Daigaku Kōka) is played. At Seiseki-Sakuragaoka Station—known as the setting of the anime film Whisper of the Heart—the station plays "Country Road" by Yōko Honna, the film's theme song.

At stations without designated local melodies, different melodies are used for upbound and downbound trains, and also vary depending on whether the train is stopping, passing through, or running as a non-revenue train. Additionally, the pitch of the departure bells differs between platforms for each direction.

===== Keikyū Corporation =====
At most stations, Keikyū uses Mozart's "6 Ländlerische Tänze" ("Six dances in the Ländler style") as the approach melody. Before this, the "Westminster Quarters" were used. The sound source for both melodies is provided by melody ICs manufactured by Seiko Epson.

On November 18, 2005, in celebration of the 7th anniversary of the opening of Haneda Airport Station (now Haneda Airport Terminal 1·2 Station), an original approach melody was introduced for the first time at the station. The melody was "Akai Densha" (赤い電車; "Red Train") by the band Quruli, which is also Keikyu's image song. A music box-style arrangement produced by the band's member Shigeru Kishida was used.

In July 2008, Keikyū held a public contest titled "Keikyū Station Melody Grand Selection" (京急駅メロディ大募集) to solicit melodies fitting for 16 major stations. From November that year, selected melodies were sequentially introduced at the corresponding stations.

For example, at Keikyū Kawasaki Station, the famous song "Sukiyaki" (上を向いて歩こう, Ue o Muite Arukō; "I Look Up as I Walk") by Kyū Sakamoto, who was born in Kawasaki, is used. At Yokohama Station, "Blue Light Yokohama" (ブルー・ライト・ヨコハマ) by Ayumi Ishida—well known for depicting scenes of Yokohama—is played.

All melodies were produced by the company Switch, and the arrangements were mainly done by Hiroshi Shiozuka. However, "Akai Densha" retained the 2005 version arrangement by Shigeru Kishida himself, with Naoya Fukushima handling system operation.

===== Sagami Railway (Sōtetsu) =====
At Futamatagawa Station and other stations in Asahi Ward, jazz pieces composed by Minoru Mukaiya were used as train approach melodies every year from July to August between 2009 and 2014.

===== Kanazawa Seaside Line (Yokohama Seaside Line) =====
To commemorate its 25th anniversary, starting July 1, 2014, all station departure bells and approach chimes were replaced with melodies.

===== Ainokaze Toyama Railway =====
Beginning March 13, 2017, as part of the introduction of a new passenger information system, original arrival melodies were implemented at all stations. Toyama and Takaoka Stations also introduced original departure melodies.

For example, at six stations including Toyama and Takaoka, the arrival melody "Furusato no Sora" (ふるさとの空; "Hometown Sky"), which was composed by Joe Hisaishi as a hometown song for Toyama Prefecture, is used.

At Toyama Station, the departure melody is "The Four Seasons" by Vivaldi, which was used as background music in the film Mt. Tsurugidake, set in the Tateyama mountain range.

===== Manyōsen =====
At Takaoka-Eki Tram Stop, the melody of orin (a Buddhist bell) is played both when the tram approaches and just after departure. This melody is a different arrangement from the one used at Takaoka Station on the Ainokaze Toyama Railway.

===== Shizuoka Railway (Shizutetsu) =====
At all intermediate stations except Shin-Shizuoka and Shin-Shimizu, original music box-style melodies are used for each platform (upbound and downbound).

===== Enshū Railway (Entetsu) =====
At all stations where automated approach announcements are made (which may be on the platform only, concourse only, or both), approach melodies are used. These are the same as the departure melodies used at intermediate stations on the Tōbu Isesaki, Urban Park, and Tōjō Lines.

===== Nagoya Municipal Subway (Nagoya City Transportation Bureau) =====
On October 6, 2005, the Meijō Line and Meikō Line began an experimental introduction of departure melodies previously used by JR East. On March 19, 2007, original melodies were officially implemented across all lines (except the Kamiiida Line). The melodies introduced in 2007 were original compositions by Mikako Mizuno, a professor at Nagoya City University Graduate School, designed to match the image of each subway line.

Prior to the introduction of approach melodies, a two-tone chime—similar to what is still used on the Kamiiida Line today—was played.

- Higashiyama Line: Toward Fujigaoka – "Dream" (ドリーム), Toward Takabata – "Yellow Line" (イエローライン)
- Tsurumai Line: Toward Akaike – "Sunlight" (サンライト), Toward Kami-Otai – "Fantasy" (ファンタジー)
- Meijō Line: Counterclockwise – "Landing" (ランディング), Clockwise – "Circle Point" (サークルポイント)
- Meikō Line: Toward Nagoyakō – "Happy Time" (ハッピータイム), Toward Kanayama – "Umi" (海; "Sea")
- Sakura-dōri Line: Toward Tokushige – "Oval" (オーバル), Toward Taikō-dōri – "Cherry" (チェリー)

===== Hankyū Railway =====
Departure melodies are used at nearly all stations on the main lines, except Kyoto-kawaramachi Station. Different melodies are played depending on whether the train is stopping, or passing through on the upbound or downbound track.

On the Kyoto Main Line, unlike the Kōbe Main and Takarazuka Main Lines, the direction toward Kyoto-Kawaramachi is considered upbound, resulting in a reversal of the passage melody arrangement compared to the other lines.

Previously, some stations on the main lines used a traditional three-tone chime, but all of these were phased out following the update of the automated announcement system between 2006 and 2007 (although some stations on branch lines still retain the old chimes).

At some stations, an additional entry melody is played after the announcement ends.

At Kōsoku Kōbe Station and Shinkaichi Station, which are shared with Hanshin Electric Railway, the intro phrase of "I've Been Working on the Railroad" (arranged by Minoru Mukaiya) is played.

===== Hanshin Electric Railway =====
At all stations except Osaka-Umeda, Platform 2 of Kōbe-Sannomiya, Platform 3 of Shinkaichi, and jointly used stations managed by other operators (Osaka-Namba and Nishidai), the following system is in place: Before the approach announcement for arriving trains, a phrase from "I've Been Working on the Railroad" is played. For passing trains, a short original melody is played instead.

This system has been in use since 1990, and in January 2009, updated arrangements by Minoru Mukaiya were introduced.

Since March 2019, another layer was added: an additional original melody is played after the announcement.

In regular operation, most stations follow this order: Arrival version of "I've Been Working on the Railroad" or original melody for passing trains → Announcement → Original melody repeated twice (regardless of arrival or passing).

Hanshin has also prepared special emergency melodies used to alert passengers in case train operations might be suspended due to typhoons or other imminent events.

At Kōshien Station—nearest to Hanshin Kōshien Stadium—the arrival melody played before announcements is specially changed during the National High School Baseball Championship in August (since 2013) and the National High School Baseball Invitational Tournament in late March to early April (since 2015).

===== Keihan Electric Railway =====
Keihan Electric Railway (Main Line System) introduced approach melodies in June 2007, simultaneously with the implementation of departure melodies.

===== Osaka Metro (formerly Osaka Municipal Subway) =====
On the Nagahori Tsurumi-ryokuchi Line, original approach, entry, and departure melodies have been used since the line's opening in 1990. The current approach melody is based on the pitch contours of the station names "Kyōbashi" and "Tsurumi-ryokuchi" when pronounced in the Osaka dialect. The system plays the approach melody just before the train announcement, followed by the entry melody immediately after the announcement.

On all other lines except the Chūō Line and Nagahori Tsurumi-ryokuchi Line, a common entry melody was introduced earlier in 1989. This differs from the melody used on the Nagahori Tsurumi-ryokuchi Line. Typically, a 4-notes chime is played, followed by a train announcement, then an approach melody that varies depending on the direction of the train.

The Chūō Line initially used the common system-wide melody, but as mentioned earlier, it was updated to an original melody on November 13, 2024.

===== Kita-Osaka Kyūkō Railway (Kitakyū) =====
At all stations except Esaka Station, the introductory phrase of "Funiculì, Funiculà" is used. Additionally, at Minoh-kayano Station, a phrase from "Home! Sweet Home!" is also played during train entry.

===== Sanyō Electric Railway =====
Since May 2012, original approach and passing melodies composed by Hiroshi Shiozuka have been introduced at major stations.

===== Kōbe Electric Railway (Shintetsu) =====
At some stations, an arrangement of the first movement of Mendelssohn's "Symphony No. 4 'Italian'" is used.

===== Nishi-Nippon Railroad (Nishitetsu) =====
On the Tenjin Ōmuta Line, original approach melodies were introduced along with the previously mentioned departure melodies. The approach melodies are used at stations where the departure melody is implemented, as well as at Yakuin Station (only for trains bound for Ōmuta and Dazaifu).

Initially, different melodies were used on the Tenjin-Ōmuta Line and at Futsukaichi Station (Dazaifu Line), but later the melodies for the Fukuoka-bound Tenjin-Ōmuta Line and Futsukaichi Station were swapped.

These melodies are played only before the preliminary announcement; then, shortly before the train arrives, an entry announcement is made using voice only.

===== Kumamoto City Tram (Kumamoto City Transportation Bureau) =====
At Senbabashi Tram Stop, Kumamoto's traditional children's song "Antagata Dokosa" (あんたがたどこさ; "Where are You From?") is played. Additionally, starting March 1, 2011, as part of the campaign toward the full opening of the Kyūshū Shinkansen, the melody "Déjà Vu: Hajimete Kita no ni Natsukashii Machi" (デジャ・ヴ〜初めて来たのになつかしい街〜; "Déjà Vu: A City That's Nostalgic Though It's Your First Visit") composed by Tamiya Terashima, has been used as a departure melody at some stops.

== See also ==
- Musical road
