= Mishima Station incident =

1995 railway incident in Japan

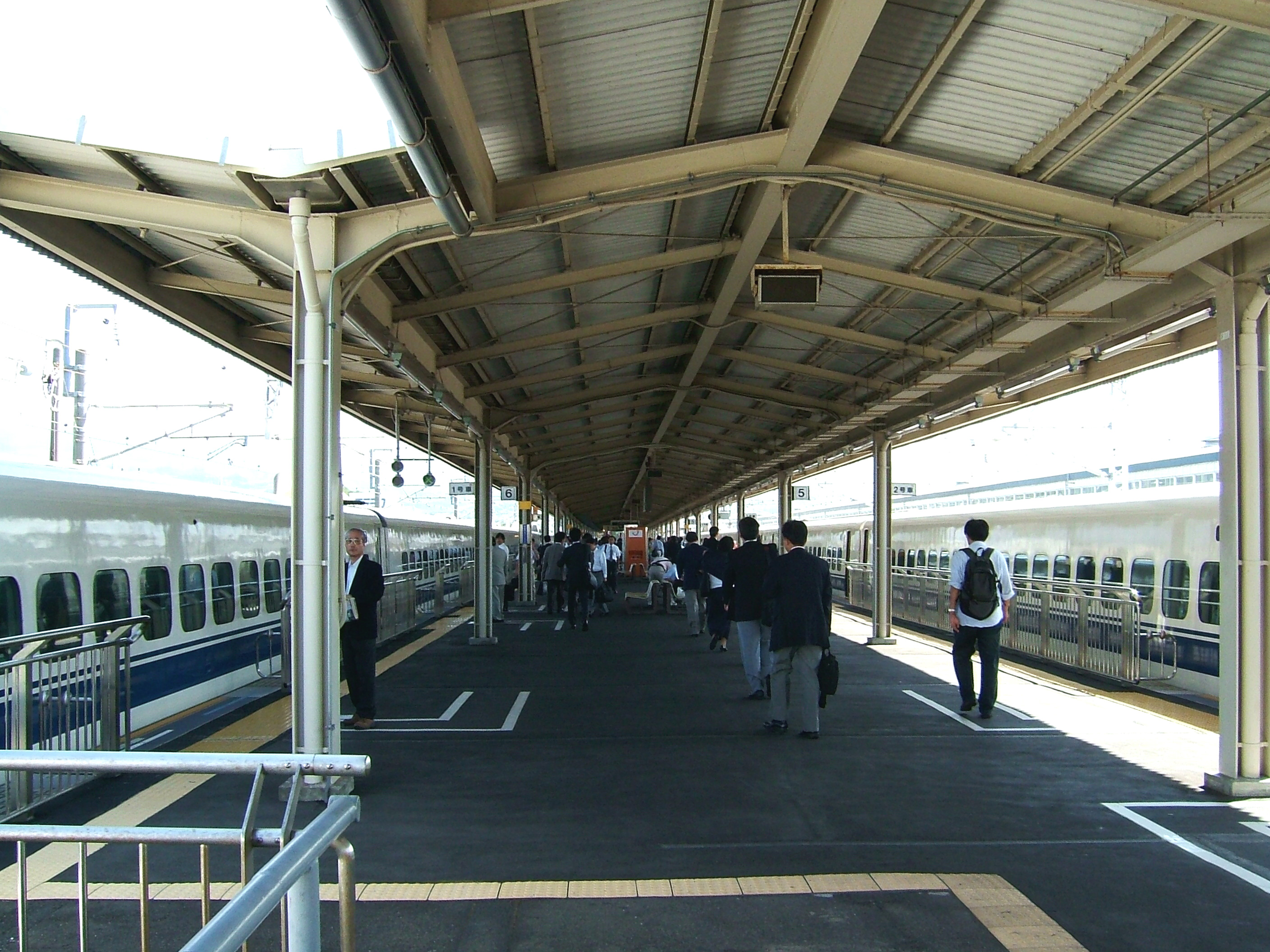
- The site of the incident, pictured in September 2004

Details
- Date: 27 December 1995; 18:30
- Location: Mishima, Shizuoka, Japan
- Coordinates: 35°07′34.82″N 138°54′40.19″E
- Line: Tokaido Shinkansen
- Operator: JR Central
- Cause: Passenger negligence, Crew negligence, design fault

Statistics
- Deaths: 1

The Mishima Station incident (三島駅事故, Mishima eki jiko) was an incident that took place at Mishima Station in Mishima, Shizuoka, Japan, on 27 December 1995, when a 17-year old male student fell to his death after getting caught in a car door of a departing Shinkansen train.

It was the first passenger fatality accident in the history of the Tokaido Shinkansen.

== Summary ==
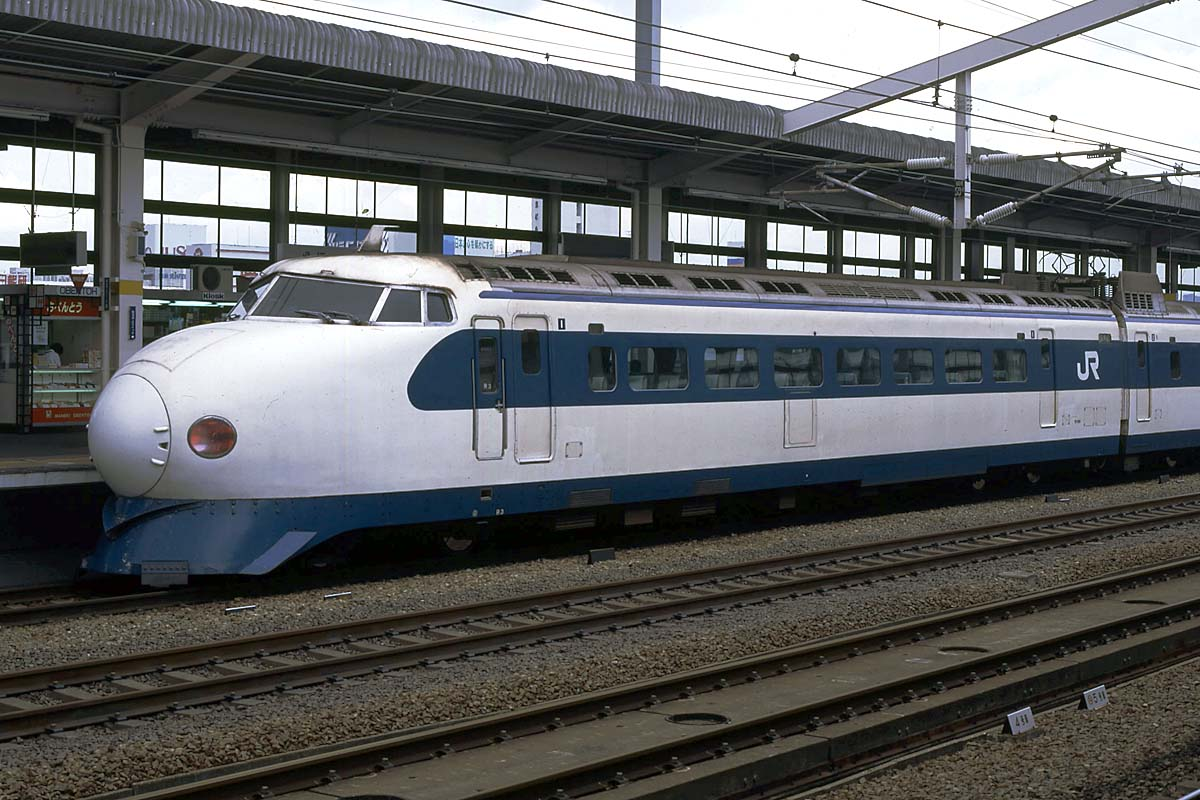
A 0 Series, the model of Shinkansen involved.

At 6:30pm local time, after using a public phone on the platform, 17-year old student Yusuke Kawarazaki attempted to board a westbound Kodama service when his finger got stuck in the door as it closed. The Shinkansen train then left the station, dragging Kawarazaki with it. The student was dragged around 100 yards (91 m) before he fell to his death, suffering a fatal head injury.

It was the first fatal incident on the Shinkansen since it began operation in 1964.

== Overview ==
At the time of the incident, all passenger doors on Shinkansen trains were kept closed using an airtight seal. On this particular train, a 0 series, the seal would be activated the instant the door closed. The force of the airtight seal had been enough to trap the student's finger in the door mechanism. In addition, a device which was tasked with detecting foreign objects in the door mechanism was only able to detect objects of a certain diameter. The diameter of Kawarazaki's finger was smaller than what the device was able to detect.

== Aftermath and trial ==
In 1997, JR West announced changes to the door structure of all Shinkansen trains running on the Tokaido and San'yō Shinkansen lines. This included changes to mechanisms meant to keep the doors closed while the train is in motion. For the series of train involved, the speed at which the seal for the doors is activated was changed from zero to 30 kilometres per hour (19 mph).

In March 2001, the bereaved family sued JR Central for negligence leading to the fatality. At the trial, it was determined that the student lacked the responsibilities and awareness expected of those using the trains. At the same time, it was determined that the company had the ability (and responsibility) to ensure that the Shinkansen train was ready to depart, and thus prevent the accident. As a result, the Shizuoka District Court ruled that JR Central was 60% at fault while the victim was 40% at fault. As a result, JR Central was ordered to pay the family ¥48,460,000 (Around $320,000 USD, inflation adjusted). Both sides appealed to the ruling. However, a settlement was reached at the Tokyo High Court later that year on 26 November, almost six years after the incident occurred.

== See also ==
- List of rail accidents (1990–99)
