= Kameari Station =

Railway station in Tokyo, Japan

Coordinates: 35.7666°N 139.8477°E

JL20 Kameari Station 亀有駅
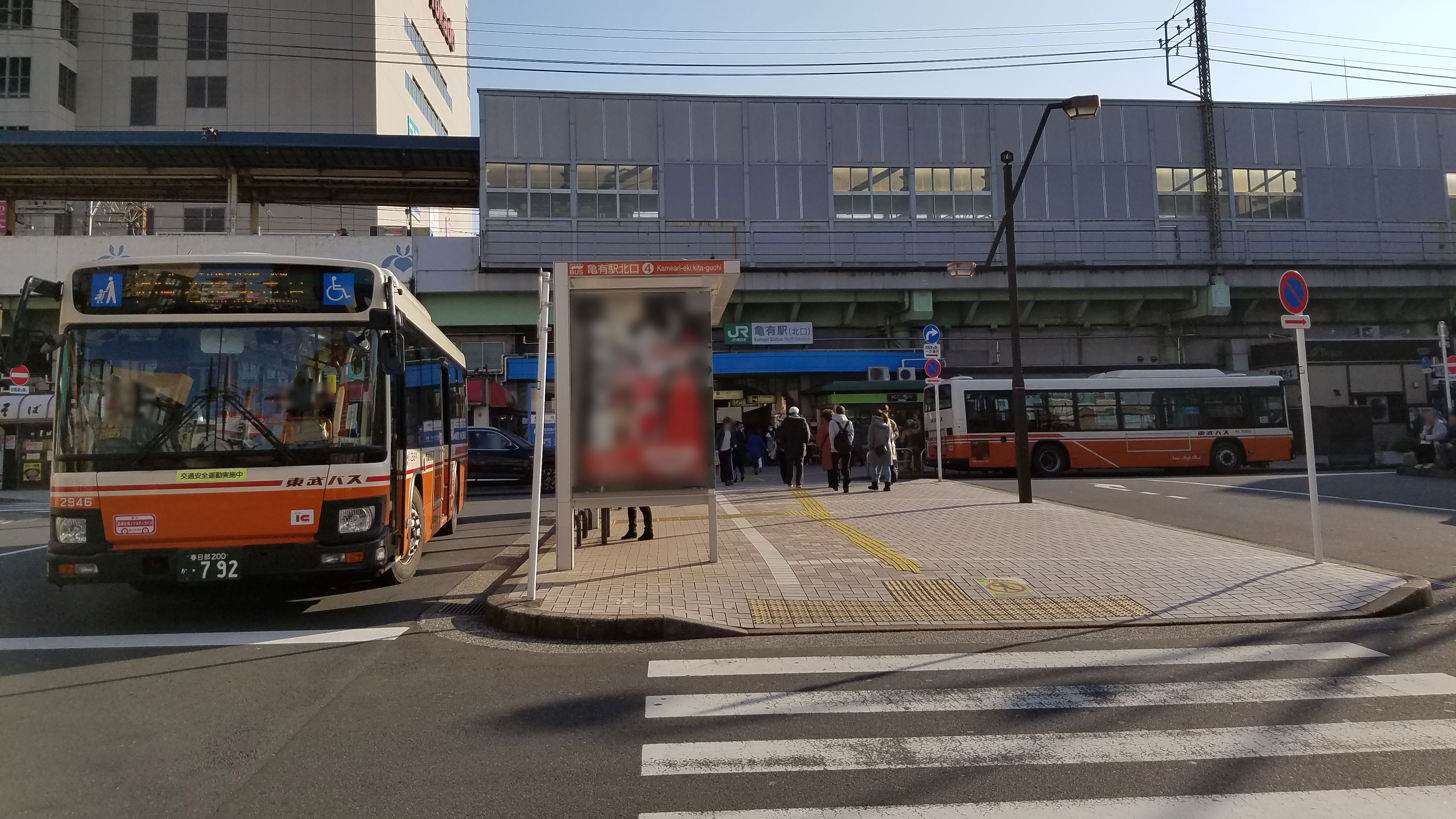
- The north entrance in January 2017

General information
- Location: 3 Kameari, Katsushika-ku, Tokyo; Japan
- Operator: JR East
- Line: Jōban Line (Local) (Local)
- Platforms: 1 island
- Tracks: 4

History
- Opened: 17 May 1897

Passengers
- FY2015: 41,058 daily

Services
| Preceding station | JR East | Following station |
|---|---|---|
| Ayase JL19 Terminus | Jōban Line (Local) Local-Kankō | Kanamachi JL21 towards Toride |
Location
- Location within Tokyo

Kameari Station (亀有駅, Kameari-eki) is a railway station on the Jōban Line in Katsushika, Tokyo, Japan, operated by East Japan Railway Company (JR East).

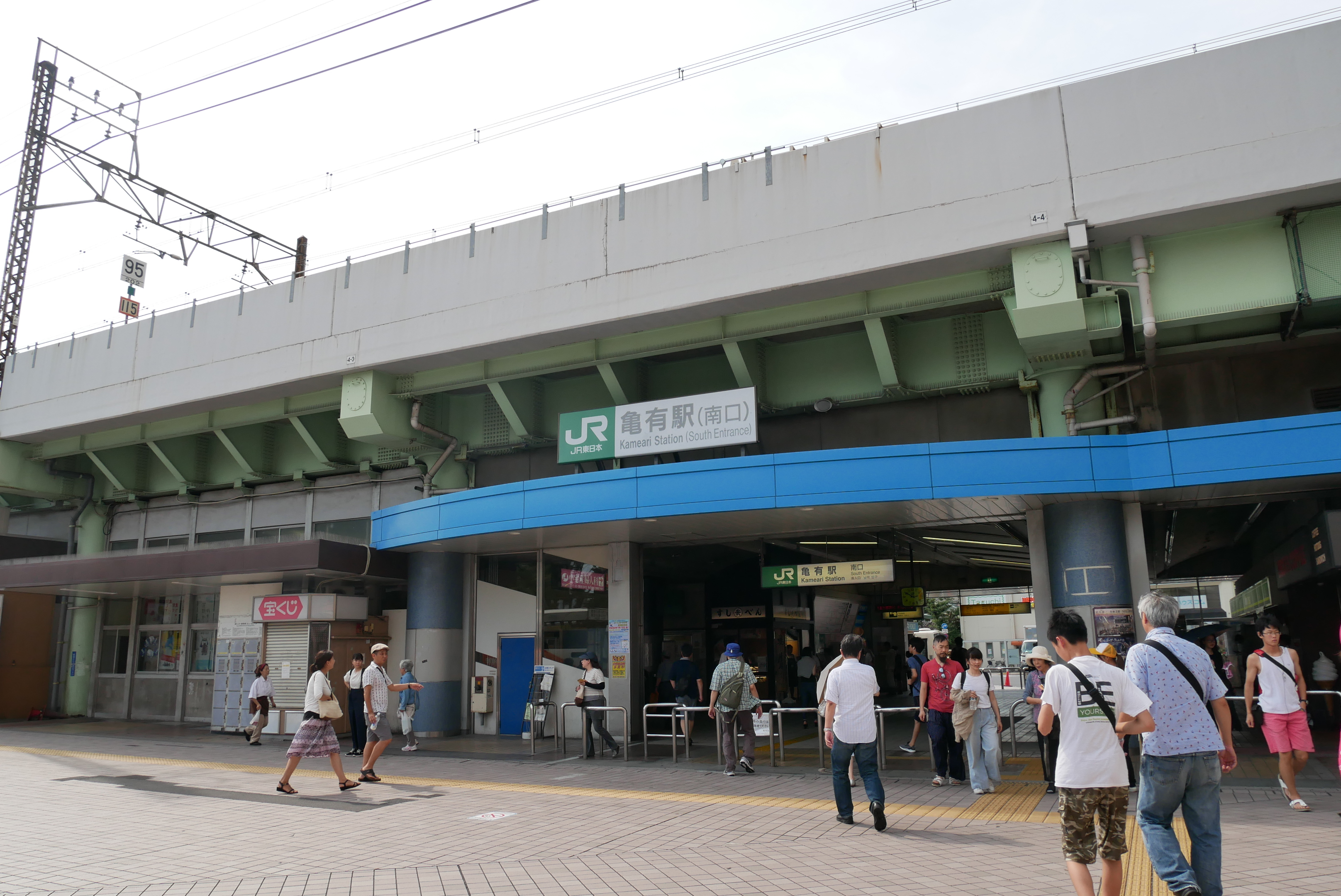
South entrance, July 2018

== Lines ==
The station is served by the Jōban Line.

== Station layout ==
The station has an island platform with two tracks for local services. Tracks for non-stop (rapid) trains run parallel to the local tracks but are not served by platforms at this station. The main entrance features a NewDays convenience store and Becks Coffee, with wheelchair access to the platform via elevator.

=== Platforms ===
| 1 | Jōban Line (Local) | for Matsudo, Kashiwa, Abiko, and Toride |
| 2 | Jōban Line (Local) | for Ayase; Tokyo Metro Chiyoda Line for Kita-senju, Nishi-nippori and Yoyogi-uehara |

== History ==
The station opened on 17 May 1897. In May 2023 construction of a series of free-standing canopies was completed on the North side of the station providing sheltered access to all bus platforms.

== Passenger statistics ==
In fiscal 2015, the station was used by an average of 41,058 passengers daily (boarding passengers only). In the same year, data available from Japan’s Ministry of Land, Infrastructure, Transport and Tourism, Kameari → Ayase was one of the train segments among Tokyo's most crowded train lines during rush hour.

== Surrounding area ==
The koban located at the north entrance of the train station is known as a model of a koban in Osamu Akimoto's long-running manga Kochira Katsushika-ku Kameari Kōen-mae Hashutsujo. The police cartoon stages in Kameari area where the train station is situated. As a tribute to the cartoon, two statues of the officer Kankichi Ryotsu, the main character of the series, were placed near north and south entrances of the train station in 2006. Other statues of Kochi-Kame characters can be spotted in the surrounding area including Kameari Koen and are common photo spots for tourists.

== See also ==
- List of railway stations in Japan
