= Jōban Line (Local) =

Railway line in Japan

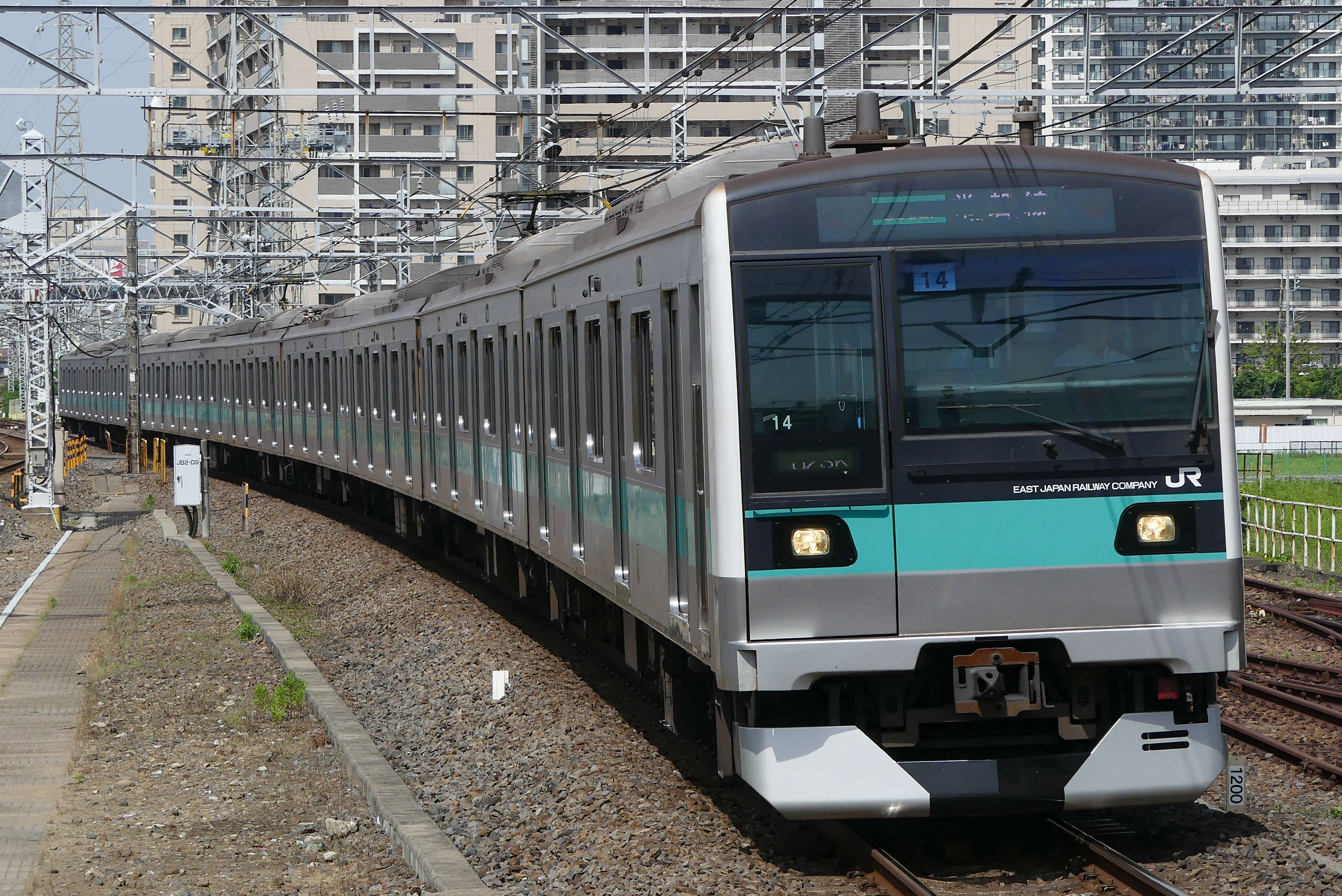
- E233 Series used on the Joban Line

Overview
- Native name: 常磐緩行線
- Owner: JR East
- Locale: Tokyo, Chiba, Ibaraki, Fukushima, Miyagi prefectures
- Termini: Ayase; Toride
- Stations: 14

Service
- Operator: JR East

Technical
- Track gauge: 1,067 mm (3 ft 6 in)

Jōban Line (Local) (Japanese: 常磐緩行線, Hepburn: Jōban-kankō-sen) is a railway line that runs from Ayase in Tokyo to Toride in Ibaraki.

This article is about the Joban Line local (各駅停車) trains running from Ayase to Toride. For the Joban Line medium distance (普通) trains or Joban Line rapid (快速) trains please refer to Jōban Line and Jōban Line (Rapid) respectively.

== Services ==
Most trains continue on to the Chiyoda Line excluding trains during early morning and late evenings. Some trains also continue on to the Odakyu Line.

Trains don't go towards Ueno and Tokyo, so passengers must transfer to the Jōban Line (Rapid) at Kita-Senju on the Chiyoda Line. Passengers can also transfer to the Yamanote Line at Nishi-Nippori.

Trains operate every 10 minutes during daytime.

== Station list ==
- Trains stop at all stations.
- Trains only operate during weekday rush hours between Abiko and Toride.

| Station | Japanese | Distance (km) | | | Transfers | Location | Prefecture |
| Station | Japanese | Between stations | Total (from Ayase) | Total (from Nippori) | Transfers | Location | Prefecture |
|---|---|---|---|---|---|---|---|
| Ayase JL19 | 綾瀬 | 2.5 | 0.0 | 7.7 | Tokyo Metro Chiyoda Line (C-19) (Through service to Odakyū Odawara Line until Isehara) | Adachi | Tokyo |
| Kameari JL20 | 亀有 | 2.2 | 2.2 | 9.9 | | Katsushika | Tokyo |
| Kanamachi JL21 | 金町 | 1.9 | 4.1 | 11.8 | Keisei Kanamachi Line (Keisei-Kanamachi) | Katsushika | Tokyo |
| Matsudo JL22 | 松戸 | 3.9 | 8.0 | 15.7 | Jōban Line (Rapid); Keisei Matsudo Line | Matsudo | Chiba |
| Kita-Matsudo JL23 | 北松戸 | 2.1 | 10.1 | 17.8 | | Matsudo | Chiba |
| Mabashi JL24 | 馬橋 | 1.3 | 11.4 | 19.1 | ■ Nagareyama Line | Matsudo | Chiba |
| Shim-Matsudo JL25 | 新松戸 | 1.6 | 13.0 | 20.7 | Musashino Line ■ Nagareyama Line (Kōya) | Matsudo | Chiba |
| Kita-Kogane JL26 | 北小金 | 1.3 | 14.3 | 22.0 | | Matsudo | Chiba |
| Minami-Kashiwa JL27 | 南柏 | 2.5 | 16.8 | 24.5 | | Kashiwa | Chiba |
| Kashiwa JL28 | 柏 | 2.4 | 19.2 | 26.9 | Jōban Line (Rapid); Tobu Urban Park Line | Kashiwa | Chiba |
| Kita-Kashiwa JL29 | 北柏 | 2.3 | 21.5 | 29.2 | | Kashiwa | Chiba |
| Abiko JL30 | 我孫子 | 2.2 | 23.6 | 31.3 | Jōban Line (Rapid) ■ Narita Line (Abiko Branch Line), some through services for Narita | Abiko | Chiba |
| Tennōdai JL31 | 天王台 | 2.7 | 26.3 | 34.0 | Jōban Line (Rapid) | Abiko | Chiba |
| Toride JL32 | 取手 | 3.4 | 29.7 | 37.4 | Jōban Line (Rapid) ■ Jōban Line (For Tsuchiura) ■ Jōsō Line | Toride | Ibaraki |

== Rolling stock ==
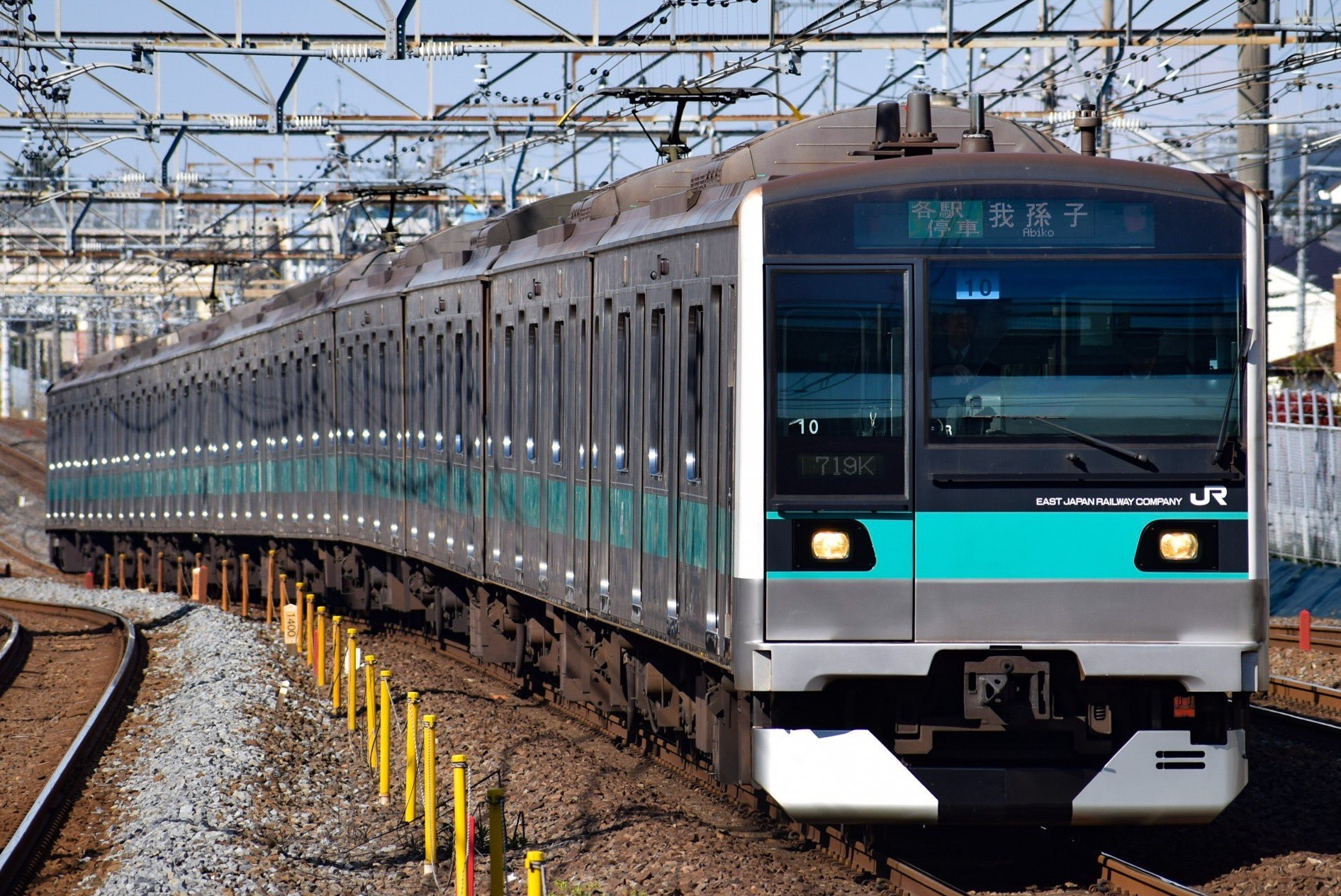
A JR East E233-2000 series train

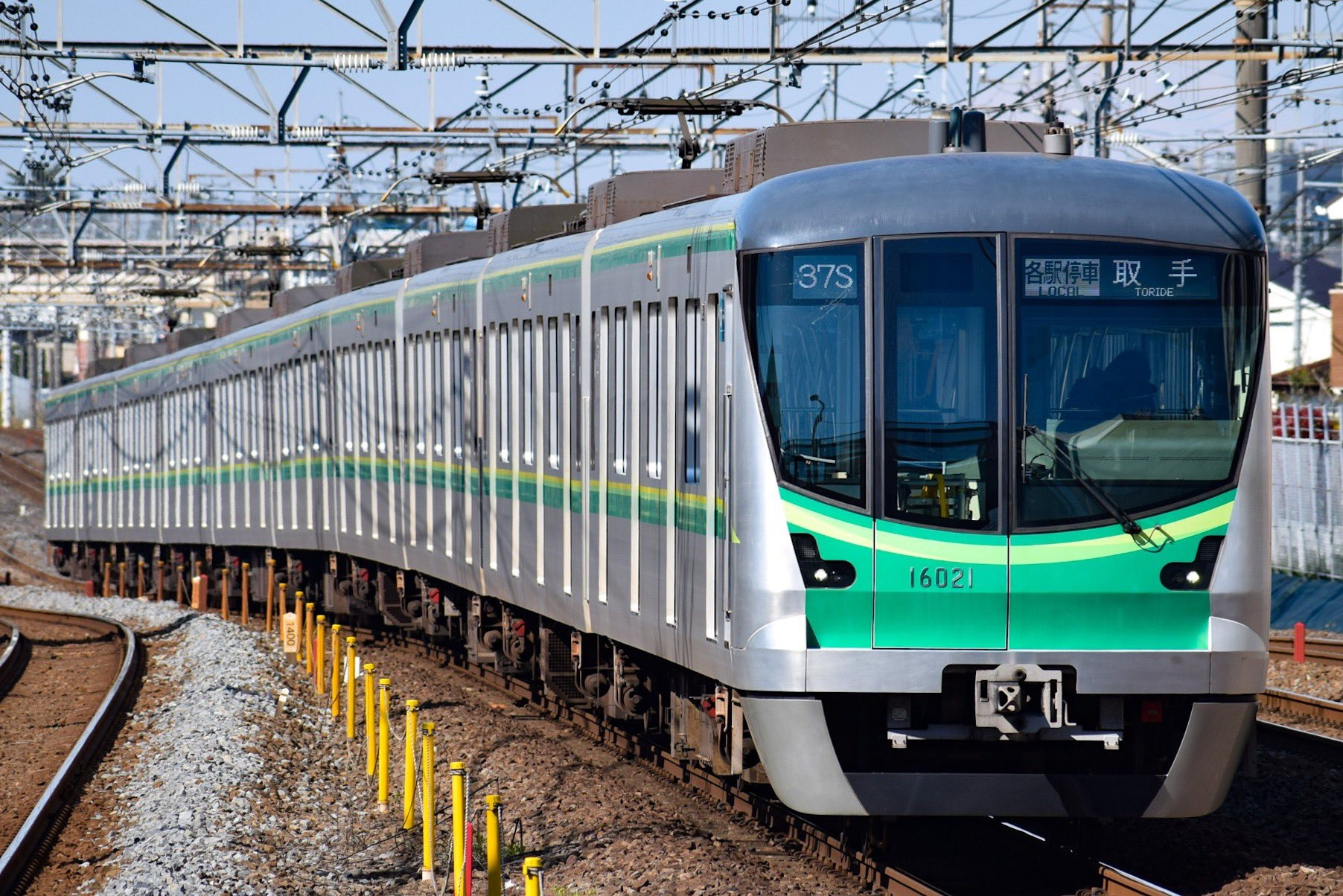
A Tokyo Metro 16000 series train

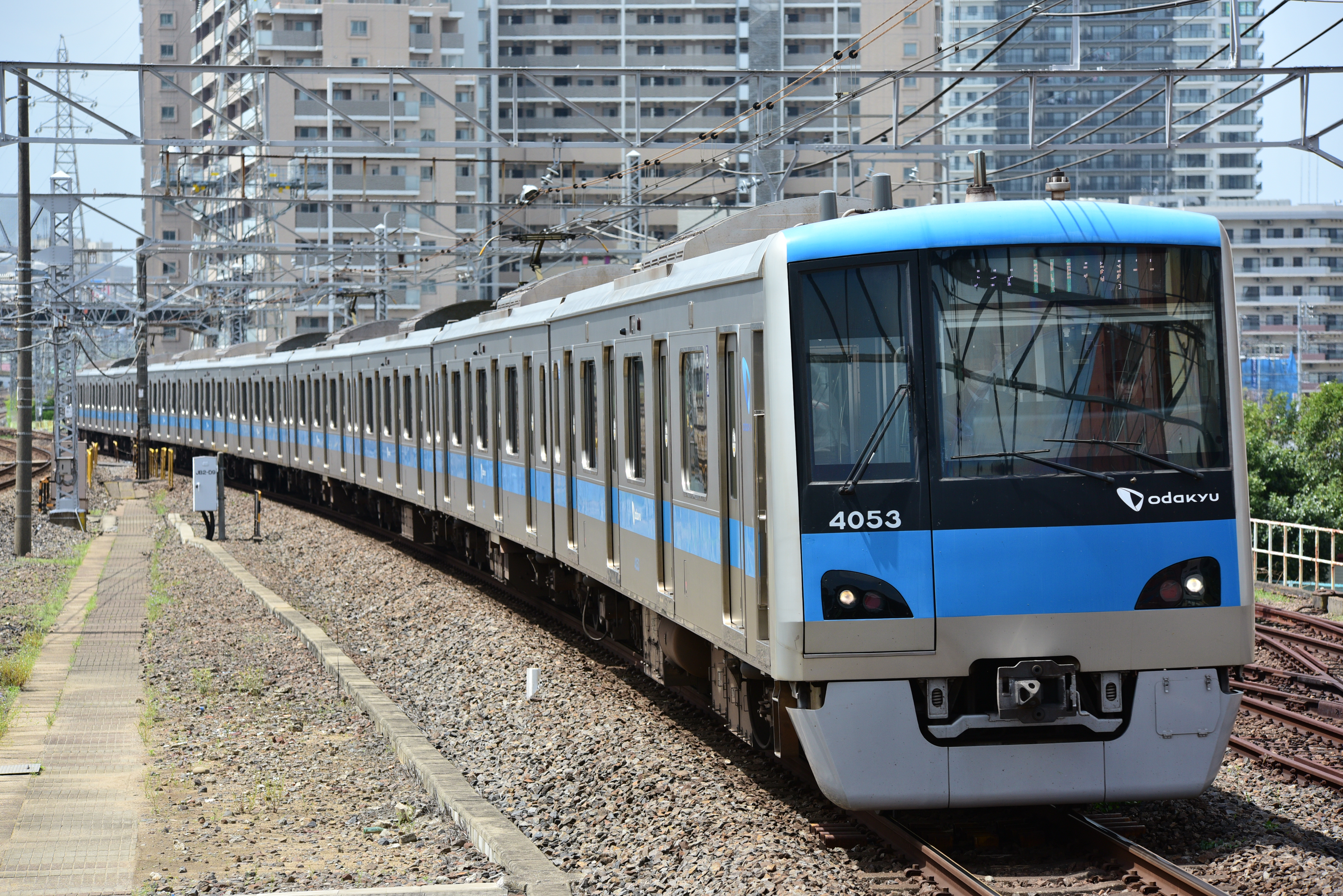
An Odakyu 4000 series train

- JR East stock
  - E233-2000 series (x19) 10-car EMUs
- Tokyo Metro stock
  - Tokyo Metro 16000 series (x37) 10-car EMUs
- Odakyu stock
  - Odakyu 4000 series (x16) 10-car EMUs
