= Doyo =

Japanese children's songs

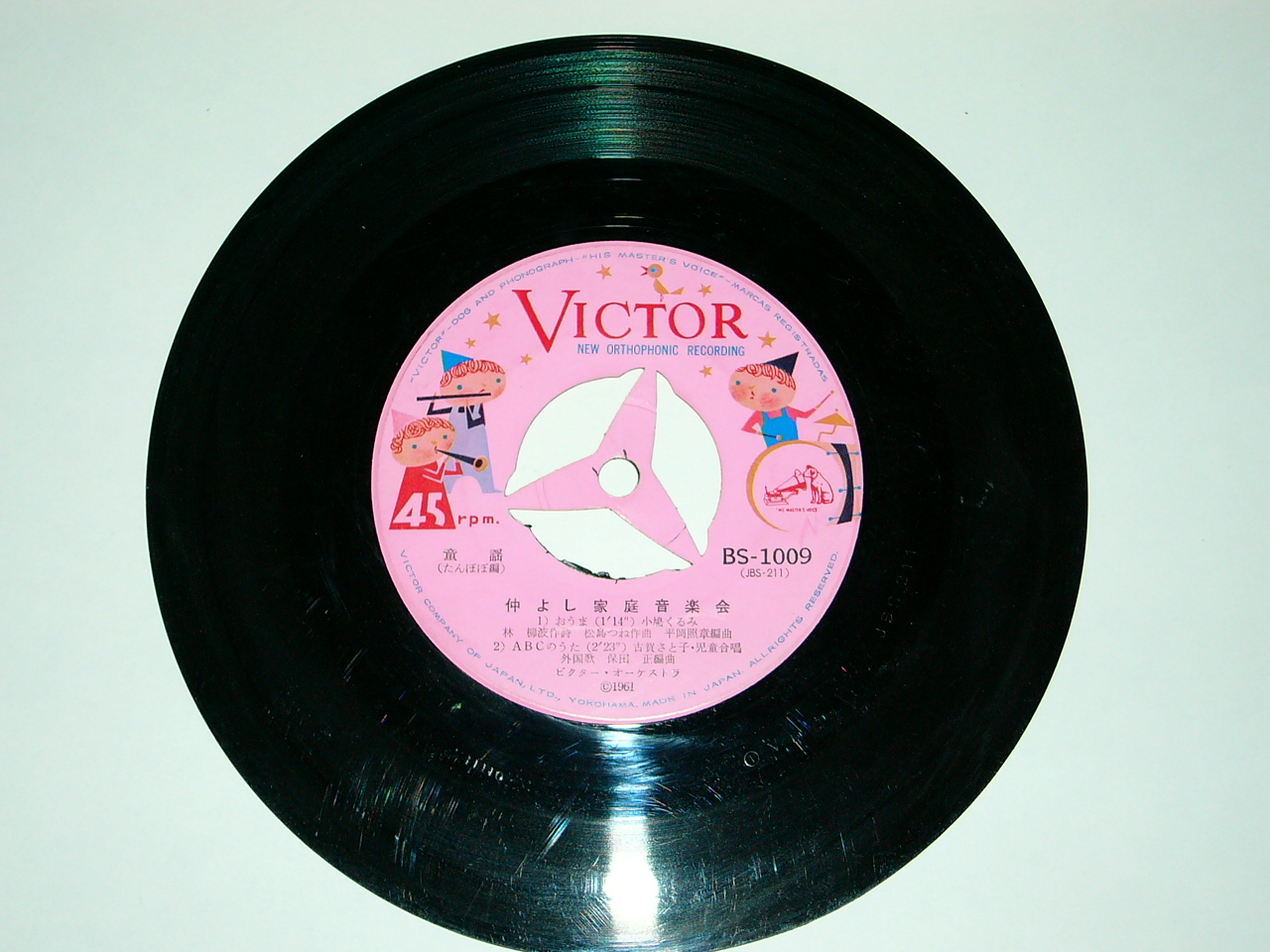
A children's vinyl record from 1961

Dōyō (童謡) are Japanese children's songs that are well-known across Japan.

== Background ==
After Japan was opened to the West in 1867 and following the Meiji Restoration, music teachers were invited from abroad, and some of them adapted Japanese words to simple foreign songs. In time, Japanese composers began writing children's songs called shōka in this new Western style. These songs were mainly sung in compulsory music classes in primary schools around the country.

== Development of dōyō ==
In 1918, a new movement began in which Japan’s top songwriters assembled to consciously create higher quality children’s songs. It was called "The Red Bird Movement", referring to a progressive children's literature magazine Akai tori (赤い鳥, "Red Bird"), which published the songs. The songs were called dōyō, and they were later introduced in textbooks throughout Japan, becoming an essential part of the nation’s musical education.

All Japanese are familiar with the songs today, and most people have a great affection for them. Despite their somewhat recent origin, they are considered to be an important element of Japanese culture. The themes of the songs are very closely tied to nature. They reflect a more simple and gentle era.
