= Keihan 9000 series =

Japanese train type

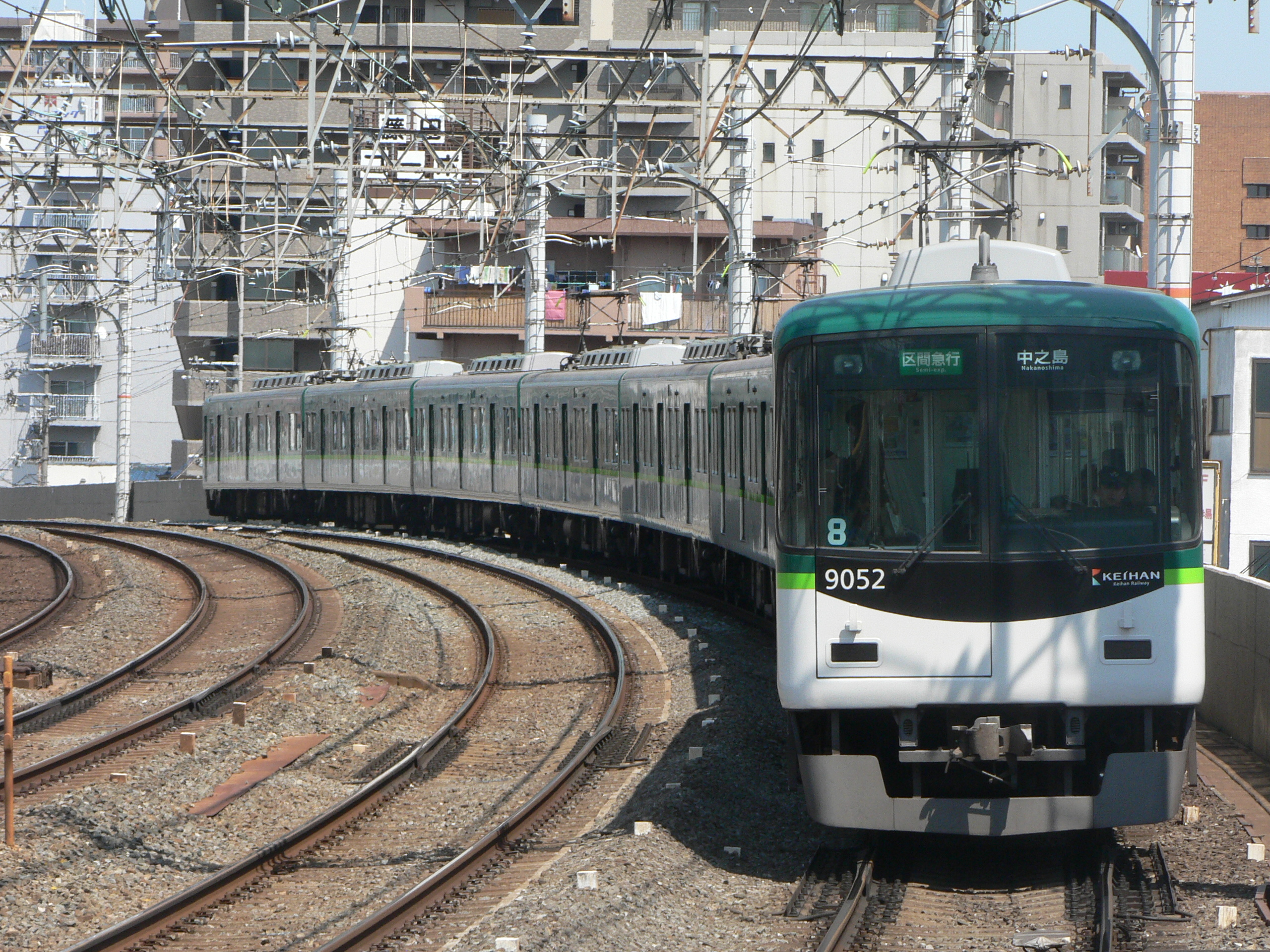
- 8-car set 9002 in May 2010
- In service: 1997–present
- Manufacturer: Kawasaki Heavy Industries
- Built at: Kobe
- Constructed: 1997
- Entered service: 22 March 1997
- Number built: 40 vehicles (5 sets)
- Number in service: 36 vehicles (5 sets) (Note: Excludes four cars converted to 10000 series)
- Formation: 7/8 cars per trainset
- Fleet numbers: 9001–9005
- Operator: Keihan Electric Railway
- Lines served: Keihan Main Line; Keihan Nakanoshima Line; Keihan Ōtō Line

Specifications
- Car body construction: Aluminium
- Car length: 18,900 mm (62 ft 0 in) (end cars); 18,700 mm (61 ft 4 in) (intermediate cars)
- Width: 2,780 mm (9 ft 1 in)
- Height: 4,185 mm (13 ft 8.8 in)
- Doors: 3 pairs per side
- Maximum speed: 110 km/h (70 mph)
- Traction system: Variable frequency (GTO)
- Electric system: 1,500 V DC
- Current collection: Overhead wire
- Safety system: Keihan ATS
- Track gauge: 1,435 mm (4 ft 8 1/2 in)

The Keihan 9000 series (京阪9000系, Keihan 9000-kei) is an electric multiple unit (EMU) commuter train type operated by the private railway operator Keihan Electric Railway in Kyoto, Japan, since 1997.

== Design ==
The 9000 series trains were developed from the earlier 7200 series trains introduced in 1995.

== Formations ==
As of 1 April 2015, the fleet consists of four eight-car sets and one seven-car set. The fleet originally consisted of five eight-car sets, but one set, 9001, was reduced to seven cars in 2015.

=== 8-car sets ===
The eight-car sets are formed as follows, with four motored ("M") cars and four non-powered trailer ("T") cars.

Designation	Mc1	T1	T2	M2	M1	T3	T4	Mc2
Numbering	900x	950x	960x	910x	915x	955x	965x	905x

- "Mc" cars are motored driving cars (with driving cabs).
- "M" cars are motored intermediate cars with driving facilities at one end for depot shunting.
- "T" cars are unpowered trailer cars.
- The Mc and M cars each have one scissors-type pantograph.
- The 9500 cars are designated as "mildly air-conditioned" cars.

=== 7-car sets ===
The reformed seven-car set, 9001, is formed as follows, with three motored ("M") cars and four non-powered trailer ("T") cars.

Designation	Mc1	T1	T6	M3	T3	T4	Mc2
Numbering	900x	950x	970x	915x	955x	965x	905x

- "Mc" cars are motored driving cars (with driving cabs).
- "M" cars are motored intermediate cars with driving facilities at one end for depot shunting.
- "T" cars are unpowered trailer cars.
- The "T6" car has driving facilities at one end for depot shunting.
- The Mc and M cars each have one scissors-type pantograph.
- The 9500 car is designated as "mildly air-conditioned" cars.

== Interior ==
Passenger accommodation originally consisted of a mixture of fixed transverse seating and longitudinal bench seating, but seating was converted to longitudinal seating only from 2008.

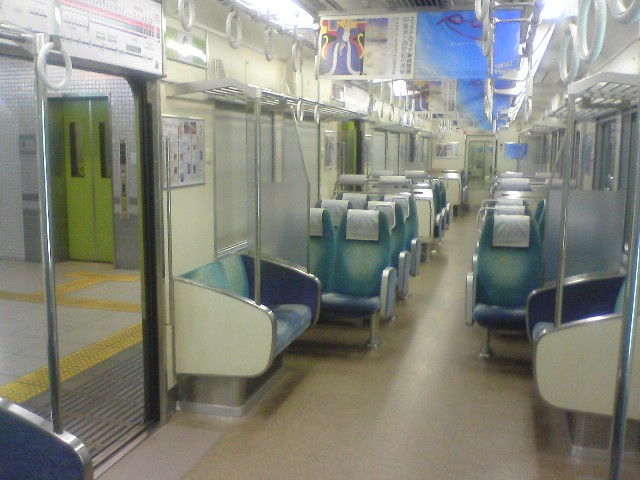
The original transverse seating in July 2007

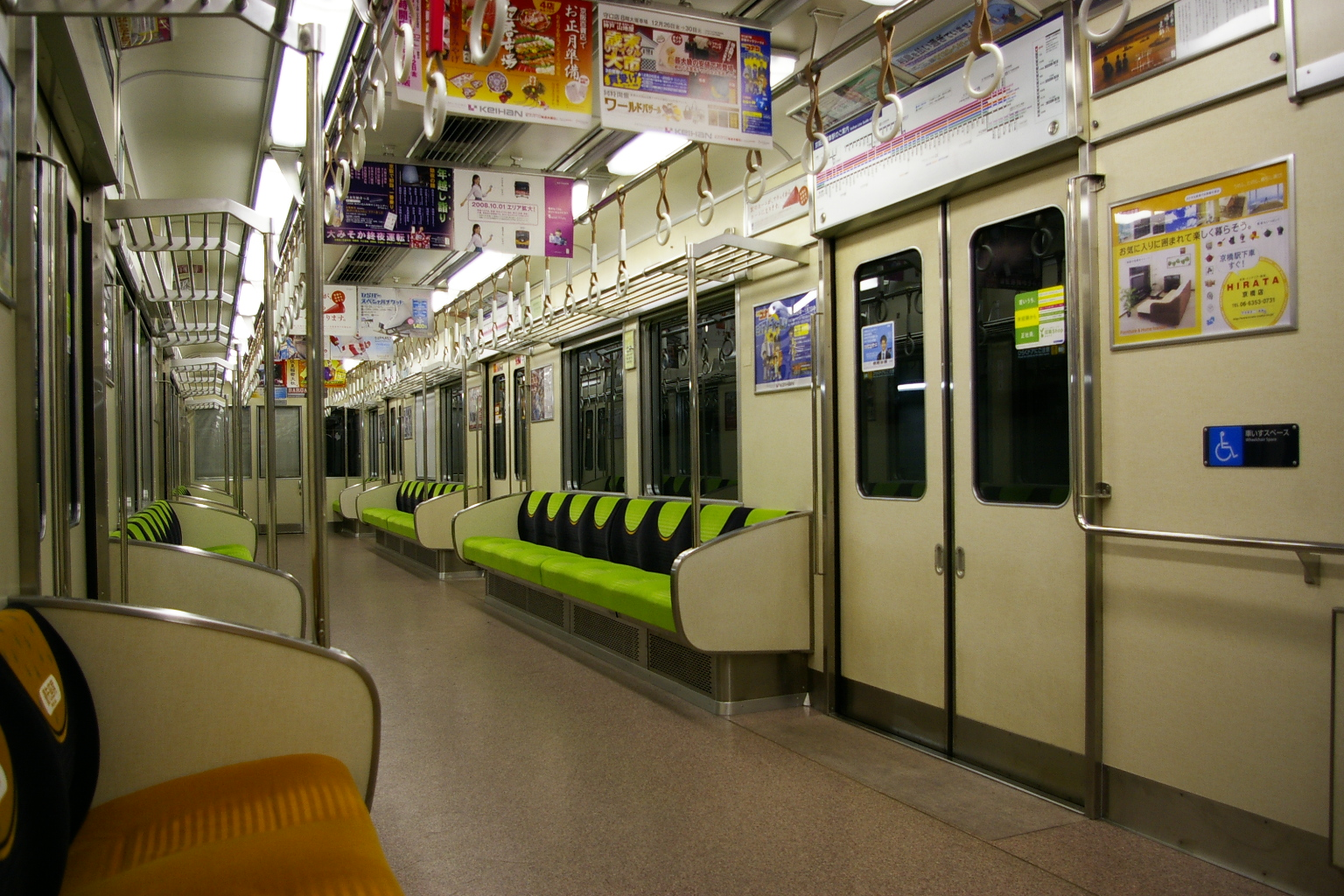
Longitudinal seating in refurbished set 9005 in December 2008

== History ==
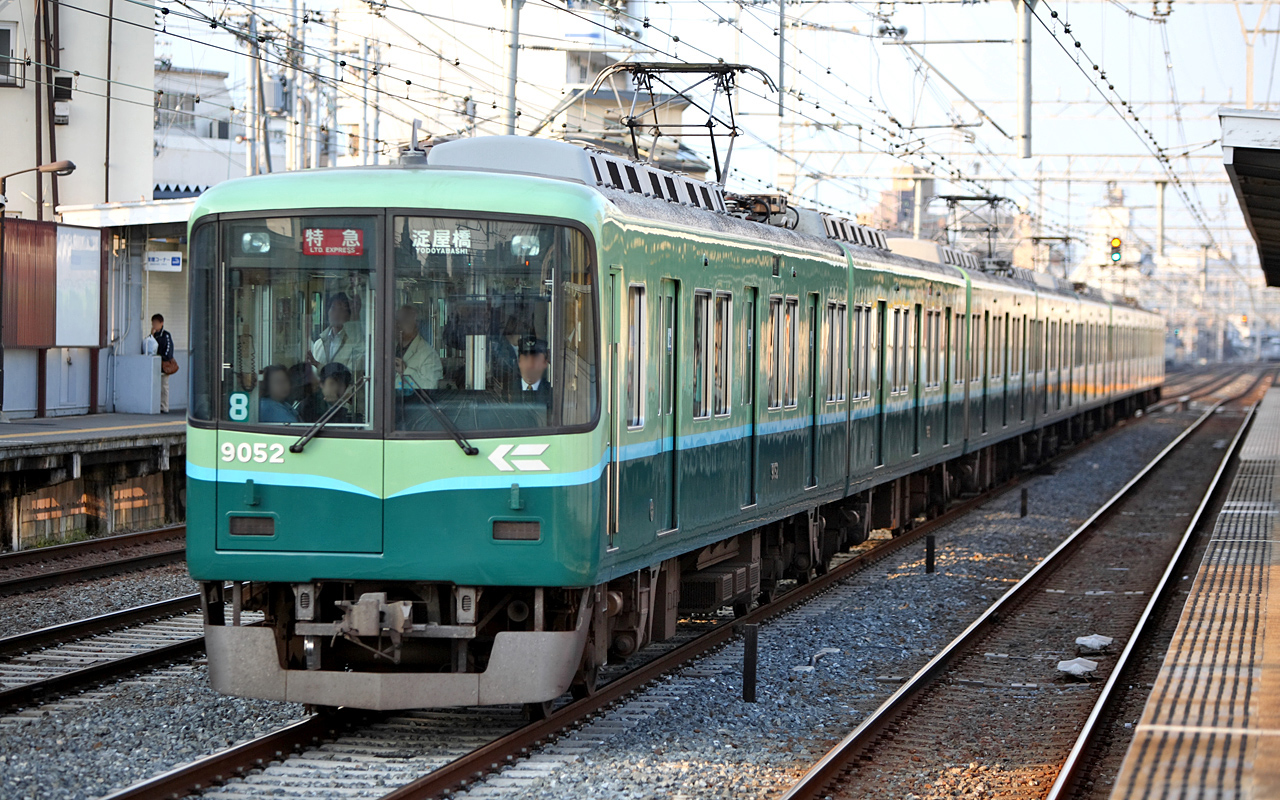
Set 9002 in original livery in April 2008

The first trains entered revenue service in 1997.

In March 2015, set 9001 was reformed as a seven-car set. Cars 9601 and 9602, removed from sets 9001 and 9002 when they were reduced to seven cars, were subsequently renumbered 10701 and 10751 respectively and inserted into 10000 series EMU set 10001 in February 2016 when that set was lengthened from four to seven cars.
