= Keihan 10000 series =

Japanese train type

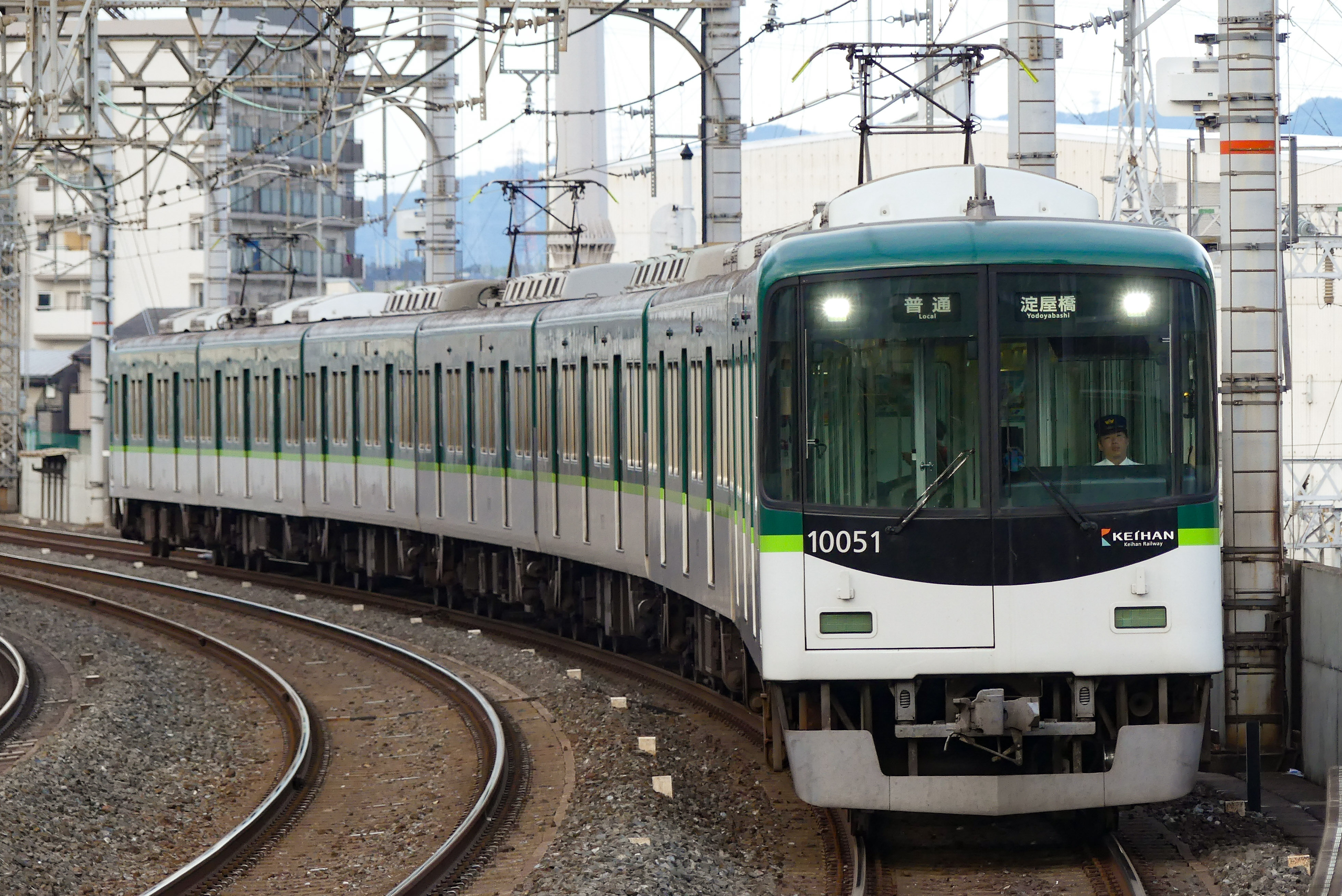
- A 7-car 10000 series set in revised livery
- Manufacturer: Kawasaki Heavy Industries
- Family name: City commuter
- Replaced: 1900 series, 2600 series
- Constructed: 1995 (as 7200 series); 1997 (as 9000 series); 2002–2006
- Entered service: 15 April 2002
- Number built: 30 vehicles (6 sets) (Note: Includes six converted 7200/9000 series cars.)
- Number in service: 30 vehicles (6 sets)
- Formation: 4/7 cars per trainset
- Fleet numbers: 10001–10006
- Operator: Keihan Electric Railway
- Lines served: 4-car sets; Keihan Katano Line; Keihan Uji Line; 7-car set; Keihan Main Line; Keihan Nakanoshima Line; Keihan Ōtō Line

Specifications
- Car body construction: Aluminium
- Car length: 18,700 mm (61 ft 4 in)
- Width: 2,780 mm (9 ft 1 in)
- Height: 4,195 mm (13 ft 9.2 in)
- Doors: 3 pairs per side
- Maximum speed: 110 km/h (70 mph) (service); 90 km/h (55 mph) (design)
- Traction system: Variable frequency (IGBT)
- Electric system: 1,500 V DC
- Current collection: Overhead wire
- Safety system: Keihan ATS
- Track gauge: 1,435 mm (4 ft 8 1/2 in)

The Keihan 10000 series (京阪10000系, Keihan 10000-kei) is an electric multiple unit (EMU) commuter train type operated by the private railway operator Keihan Electric Railway in Kyoto, Japan, since 2002.

== Design ==
The 10000 series trains were developed from the earlier 7200 series and 9000 series trains, and have 18,700 mm (61 ft 4 in) long aluminium-body cars each with three pairs of sliding doors per side.

== Operations ==
Since 2007, the 10000 series sets are primarily used on Keihan Katano Line driver-only operation services.

== Formations ==
As of 1 April 2015, the fleet consists of six four-car sets formed as follows, with two motored cab ("Mc") cars at the ends, and two non-powered trailer ("T") cars in the middle.

=== 4-car sets ===
Designation	Mc1	T1	T2	Mc2
Numbering	1000x	1050x	1065x	1005x

- "Mc" cars are motored driving cars (with driving cabs).
- "T" cars are unpowered trailer cars.
- The Mc cars each have one scissors-type pantograph.

=== 7-car trainsets ===
Set 10001, reformed as a seven-car set in 2016, is formed as follows.

Numbering	10001	10501	10701	10101	10751	10551	10051

Car 10701 was renumbered from 9000 series car 9601, car 10101 was renumbered from former 7200 series car 7301, and 10751 was renumbered from former 9000 series car 9602.

== Interior ==
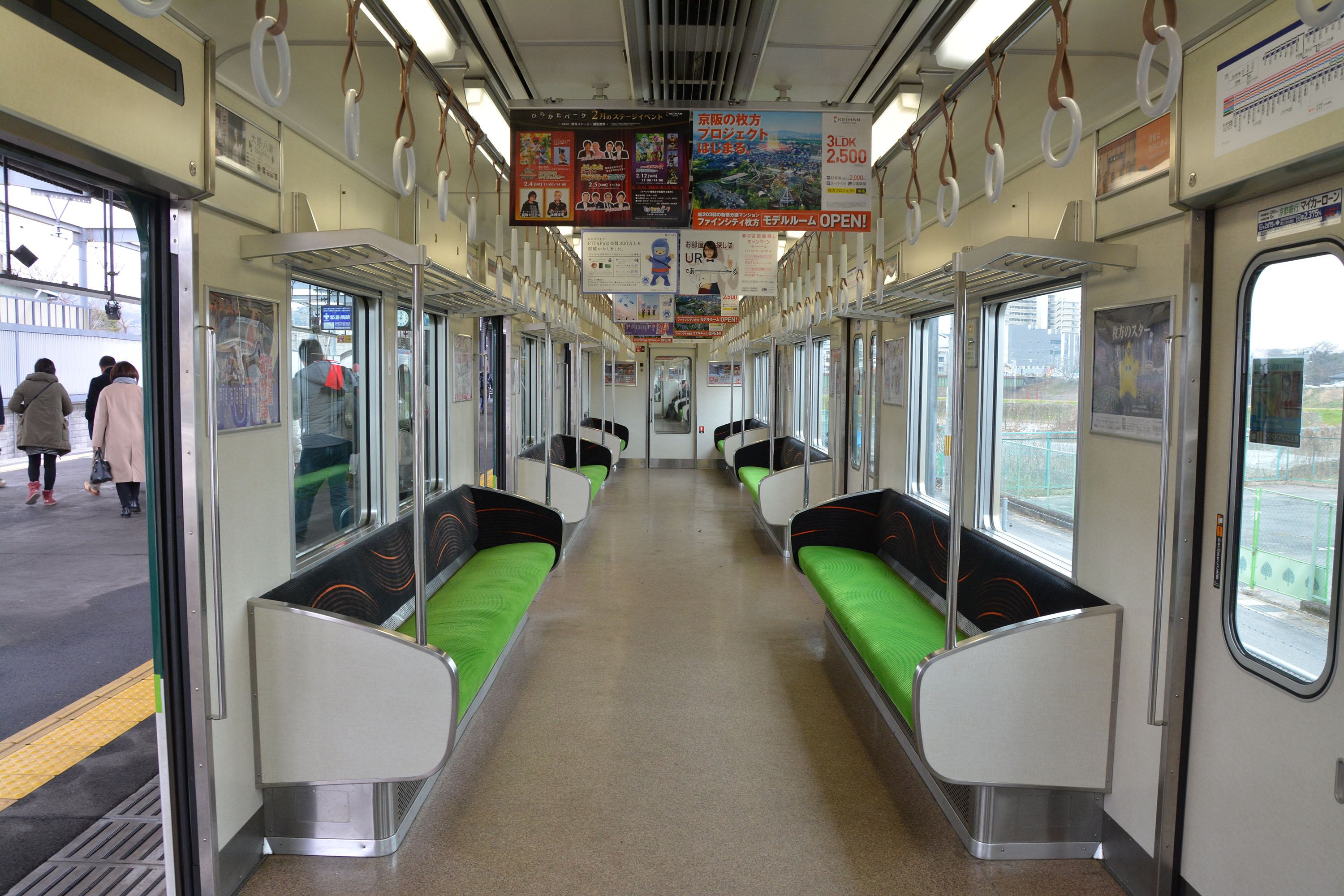
Interior view in January 2017

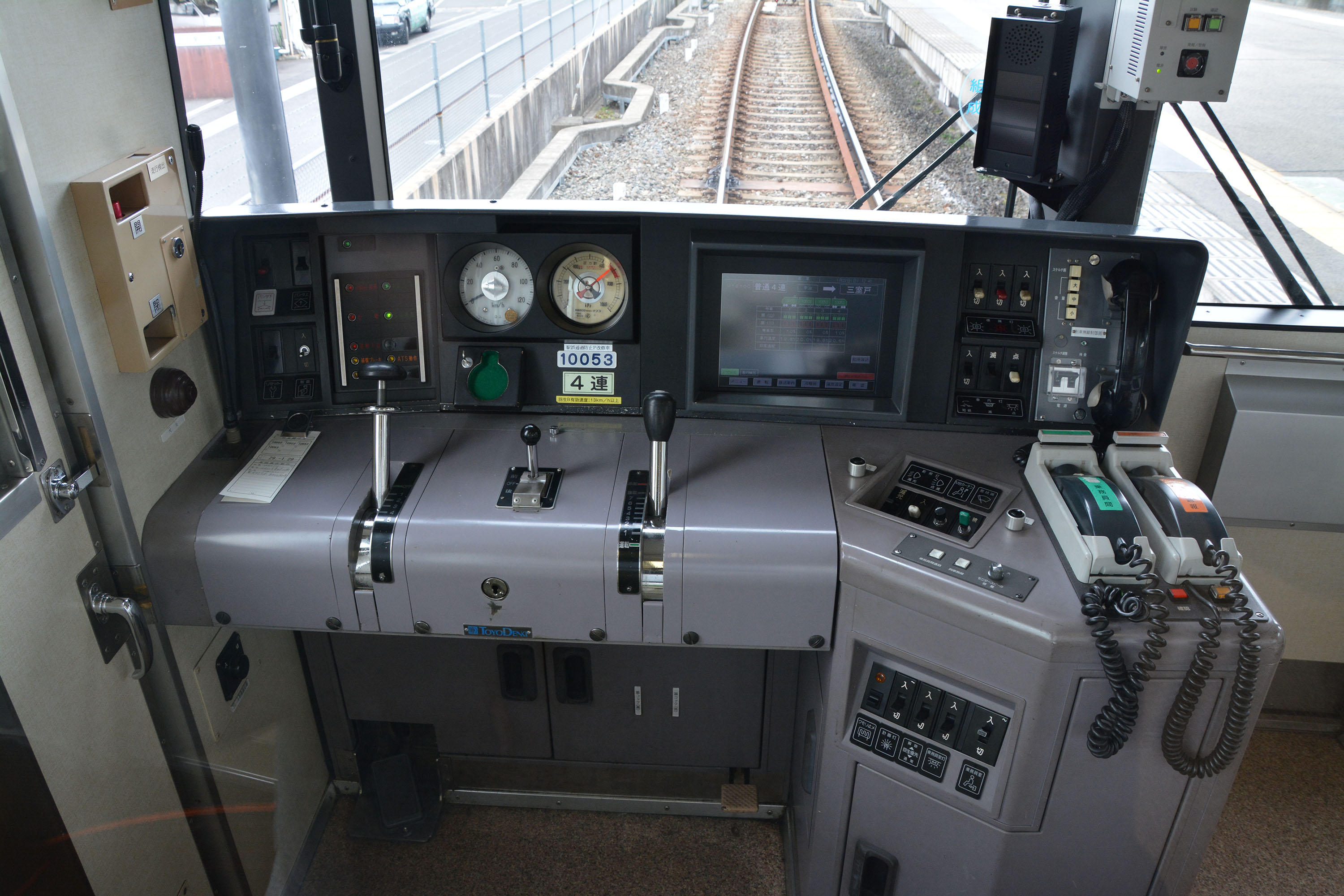
A cab interior view in January 2017

== History ==
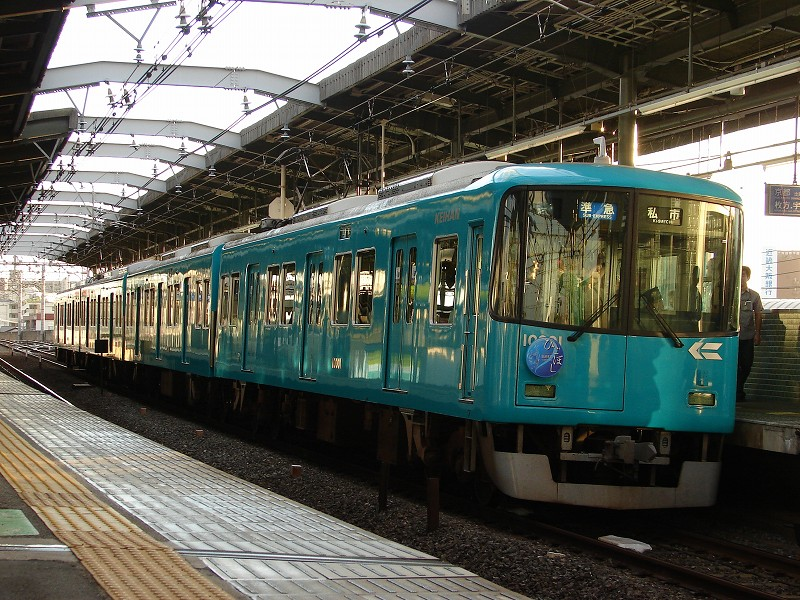
Set 10001 in original teal livery

A total of six four-car sets were built, with three sets built in 2002 and three in 2006. From 2009, the fleet was repainted into the new Keihan commuter train livery of dark green and white, with the entire fleet treated by 2010.

In February 2015, set 10001 was reformed as a seven-car set by adding two former 9000 series cars (9601 and 9602 from sets 9001 and 9002 respectively) and a former 7200 series car (7301 of set 7201) made surplus when former eight-car sets were reduced to seven cars in 2015. Set 10002 followed suit in April 2017, incorporating 9000 series cars 9603 and 9604, and 7200 series car 7302.
