= Keihan 7200 series =

Japanese train type

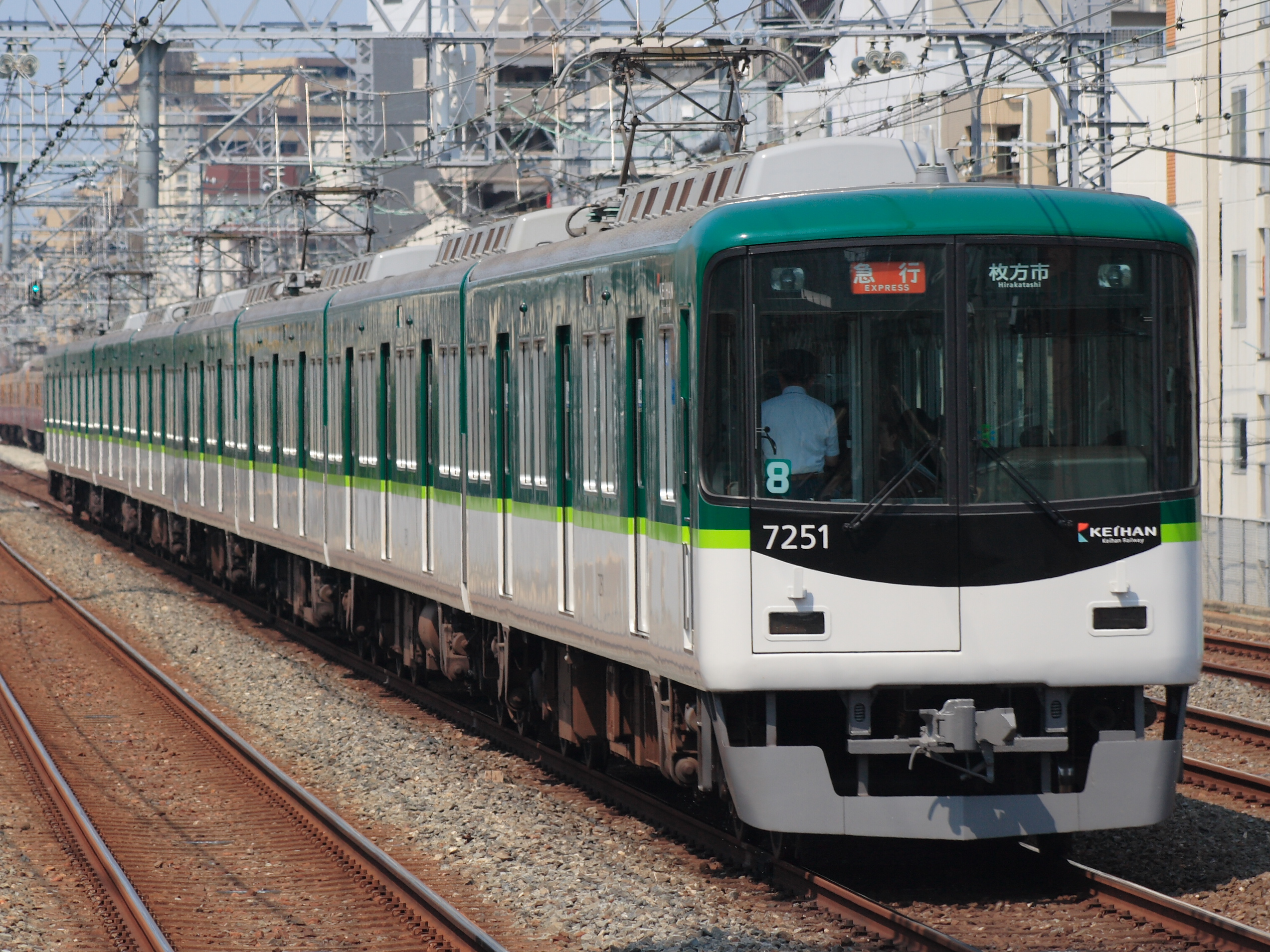
- 8-car set 7201 in July 2008
- In service: 1995–present
- Manufacturer: Kawasaki Heavy Industries
- Built at: Kobe
- Family name: City commuter
- Constructed: 1995
- Entered service: 1 May 1995
- Number built: 23 vehicles (3 sets)
- Number in service: 21 vehicles (3 sets) (Note: Excludes two cars converted to 10000 series)
- Formation: 7/8 cars per trainset
- Fleet numbers: 7201–
- Operator: Keihan Electric Railway
- Lines served: Keihan Main Line; Keihan Nakanoshima Line; Keihan Ōtō Line

Specifications
- Car body construction: Aluminium
- Car length: 18.7 m (61 ft 4 in)
- Doors: 3 pairs per side
- Maximum speed: 110 km/h (70 mph)
- Traction system: Variable frequency (GTO)
- Electric system: 1,500 V DC
- Current collection: Overhead wire
- Safety system: Keihan ATS
- Track gauge: 1,435 mm (4 ft 8 1/2 in)

The Keihan 7200 series (京阪7200系, Keihan 7200-kei) is an electric multiple unit (EMU) commuter train type operated by the private railway operator Keihan Electric Railway in Kyoto, Japan, since 1995.

== Design ==
The 7200 series trains were developed from the earlier 7000 series trains introduced in 1989.

== Interior ==
Passenger accommodation consists of longitudinal bench seating throughout.

== Formations ==
=== 8-car trainsets ===
The eight-car trains (original 7201 and 7202) are formed as follows, with four motored ("M") cars and four non-powered trailer ("T") cars.

Designation	Mc1	T1	T2	M2	M1	T3	T4	Mc2
Numbering	7200	7700	7800	7300	7350	7750	7950	7250

- "Mc" cars are motored driving cars (with driving cabs).
- "M" cars are motored intermediate cars.
- "T" cars are unpowered trailer cars.
- The Mc and M cars each have one scissors-type pantograph.
- The 7700 cars are designated as "mildly air-conditioned" cars.

=== 7-car trainsets ===
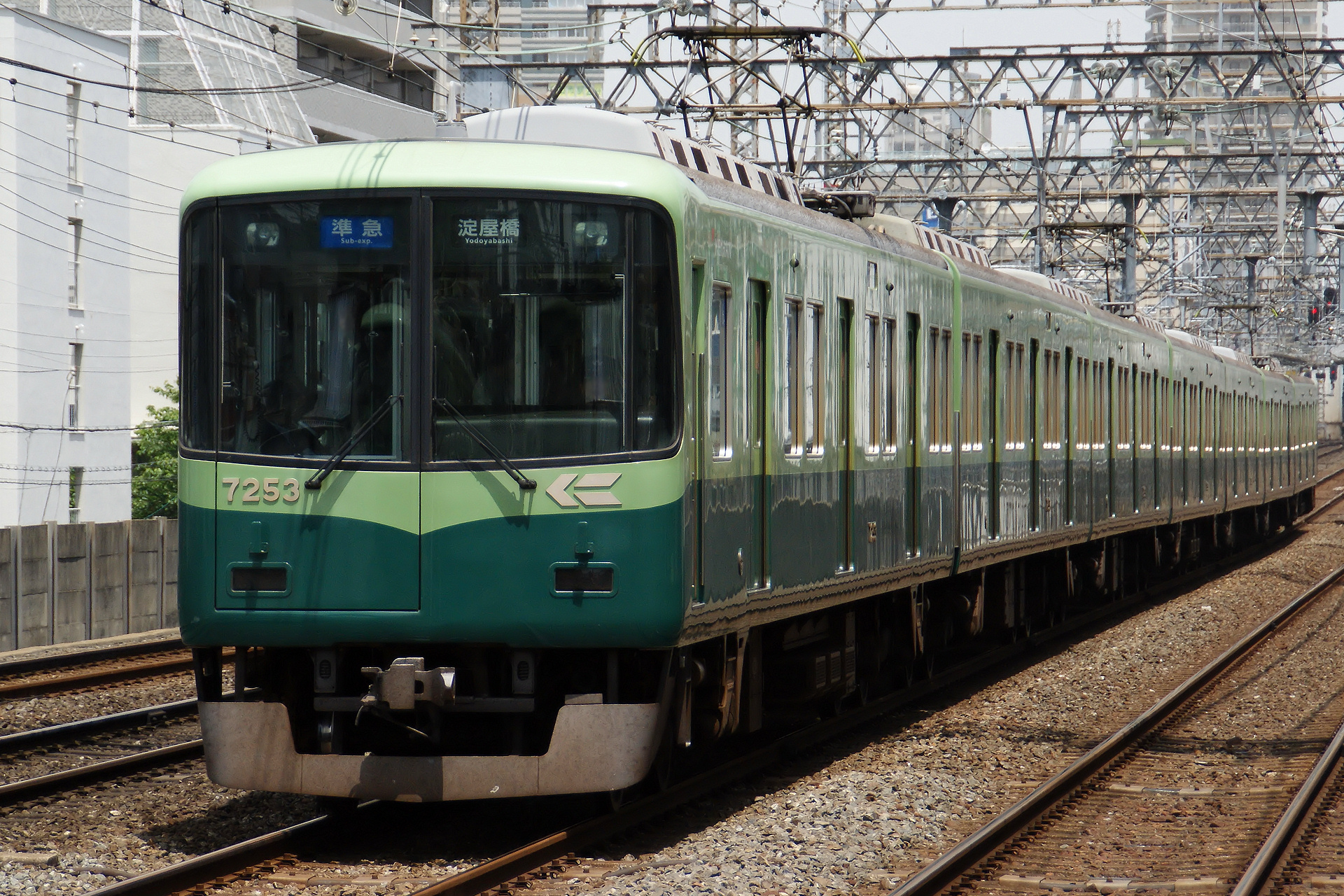
7-car set 7203 in original livery in May 2011

The seven-car trains (7201 and 7203) are formed as follows, with three motored ("M") cars and four non-powered trailer ("T") cars.

Designation	Mc1	T1	T6	M3	T3	T2	Mc2
Numbering	7200	7700	7900	7350	7750	7850	7250

- "Mc" cars are motored driving cars (with driving cabs).
- "M" cars are motored intermediate cars.
- "T" cars are unpowered trailer cars.
- The Mc and M cars each have one scissors-type pantograph.
- The 7700 cars are designated as "mildly air-conditioned" cars.

== History ==
The first trains were delivered in 1994, entering revenue service in 1995. From 2008, the fleet was repainted into the new Keihan commuter train livery of dark green and white, with the entire fleet treated by 2011.

In February 2015, set 7201 was reformed as a seven-car set. Outgoing car 7301 was renumbered 10101 and inserted into 10000 series EMU set 10001 in February 2016 to augment it from four to seven cars.
