= Keihan 6000 series =

Japanese train type

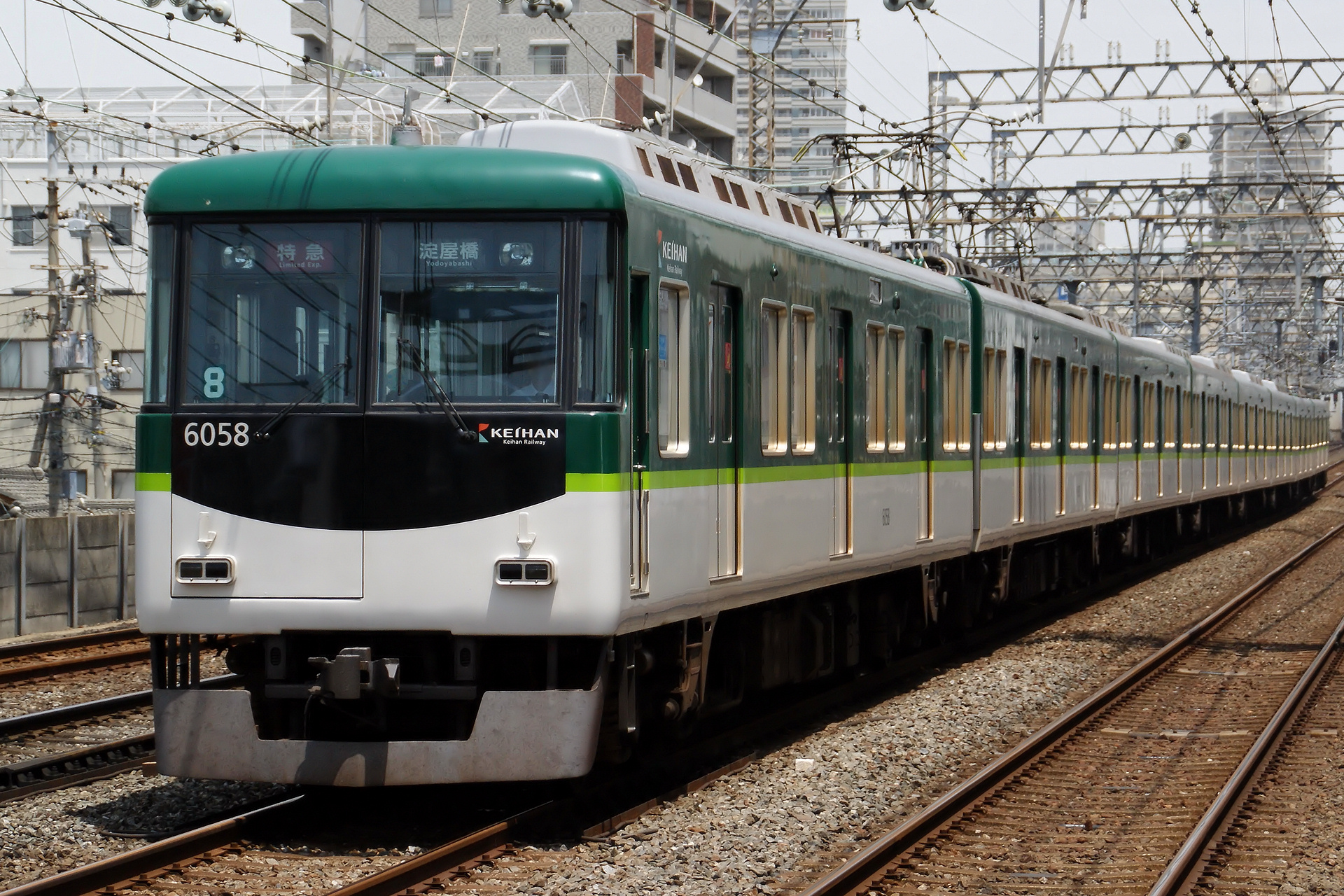
- Keihan 6000 series train on a service to Yoyodabashi
- In service: 1983–
- Manufacturer: Kawasaki Heavy Industries
- Family name: City commuter
- Constructed: 1983–1993
- Entered service: 17 March 1983
- Refurbished: 2013–
- Number built: 115 vehicles
- Number in service: 112 vehicles (14 sets)
- Formation: 8 cars per trainset
- Fleet numbers: 6001–6014
- Capacity: 97 (end cars); 101 (intermediate cars)
- Operator: Keihan Electric Railway
- Lines served: Keihan Main Line; Keihan Nakanoshima Line; Keihan Ōtō Line

Specifications
- Car body construction: Aluminium
- Train length: 149,600 mm (490 ft 10 in)
- Car length: 18,700 mm (61 ft 4 in)
- Width: 2,720 mm (8 ft 11 in)
- Height: 4,185 mm (13 ft 8.8 in)
- Doors: 3 pairs per side
- Maximum speed: 110 km/h (68 mph) (service); 120 km/h (75 mph) (design)
- Traction system: TDK–8135A
- Power output: 155 kW (208 hp)
- Acceleration: 2.5 km/(h⋅s) (1.6 mph/s)
- Electric systems: 1,500 V DC overhead wire
- Current collection: Scissors-type pantograph
- Safety system: Keihan ATS
- Track gauge: 1,435 mm (4 ft 8 1/2 in)

The Keihan 6000 series (京阪6000系, Keihan 6000-kei) is an electric multiple unit (EMU) commuter train type operated by the private railway operator Keihan Electric Railway in Kyoto, Japan, since 1983.

The series won the Laurel Prize from the Japan Railfan Club in 1984.

== Overview ==
The 6000 series was introduced in 1983 with 11 7-car sets built by the end of 1983. The remaining 38 cars would be built in 10 batches between 1986 and 1993.

The sixth batch, built in 1989, was a seven-car set with four cars being built as prototypes for next-generation VVVF traction motors. In 1993, three of those test vehicles would be renumbered and incorporated into an existing 7000 series set. In lieu, three replacement cars would be built in December 1993 as the tenth and last batch of the series.

These trains would be the basis for the 7000 series introduced in 1992.

== Interior ==
Passenger accommodation consists of longitudinal bench seating throughout.

== Formations ==
The eight-car trains are formed as follows, with four motored ("M") cars and four non-powered trailer ("T") cars.

Car	1	2	3	4	5	6	7	8
Designation	Mc	M	T	T	T	T	M	Mc
Numbering	6000	6100	6600	6500	6750	6550	6150	6050

- "Mc" cars are motored driving cars (with driving cabs).
- "M" cars are motored intermediate cars.
- "T" cars are unpowered trailer cars.
- The "Mc 6000" and "M 6150" cars each have two scissors-type pantographs.

== History ==
=== Refurbishment ===
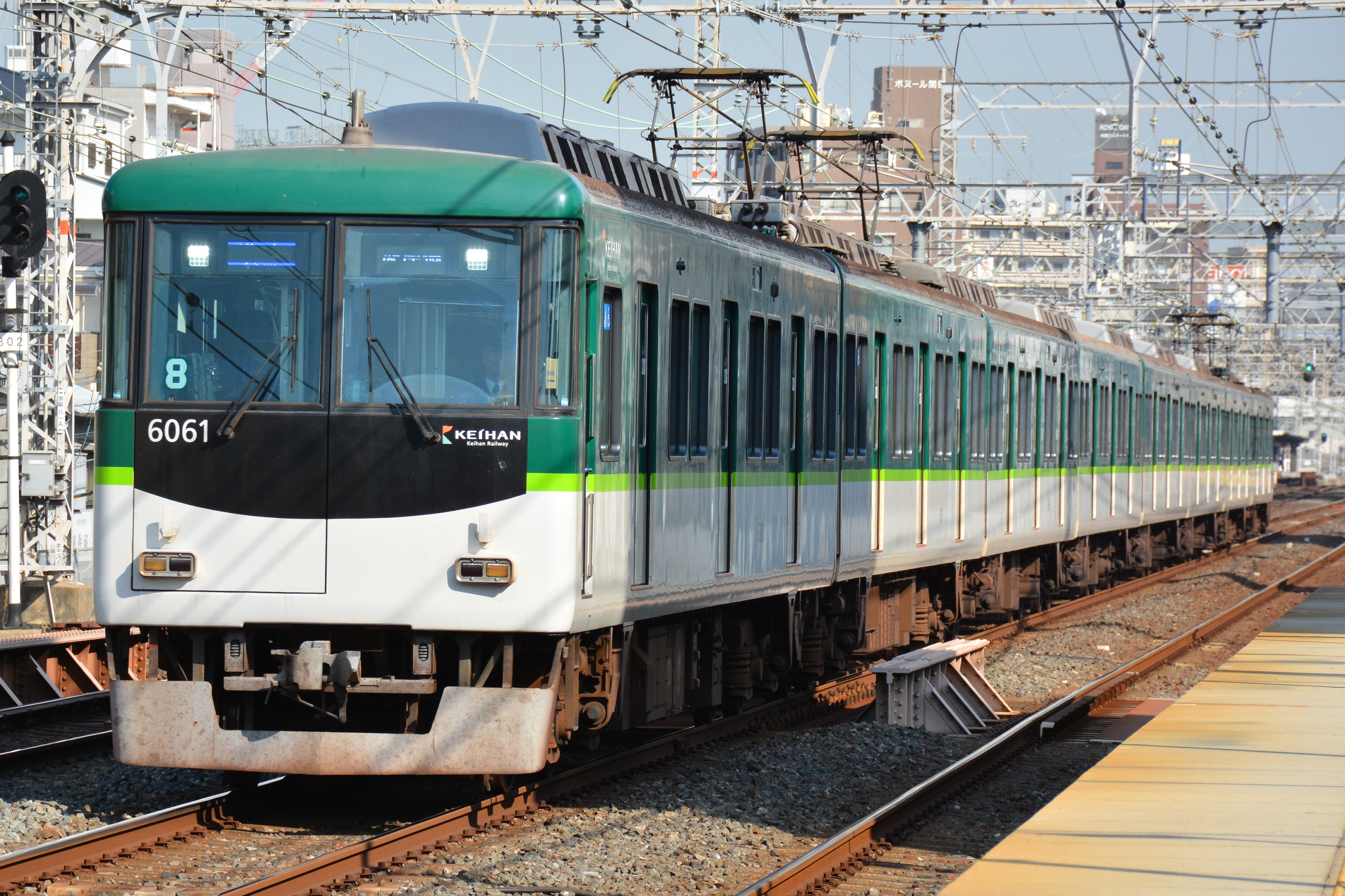
Refurbished set 6011 in November 2019

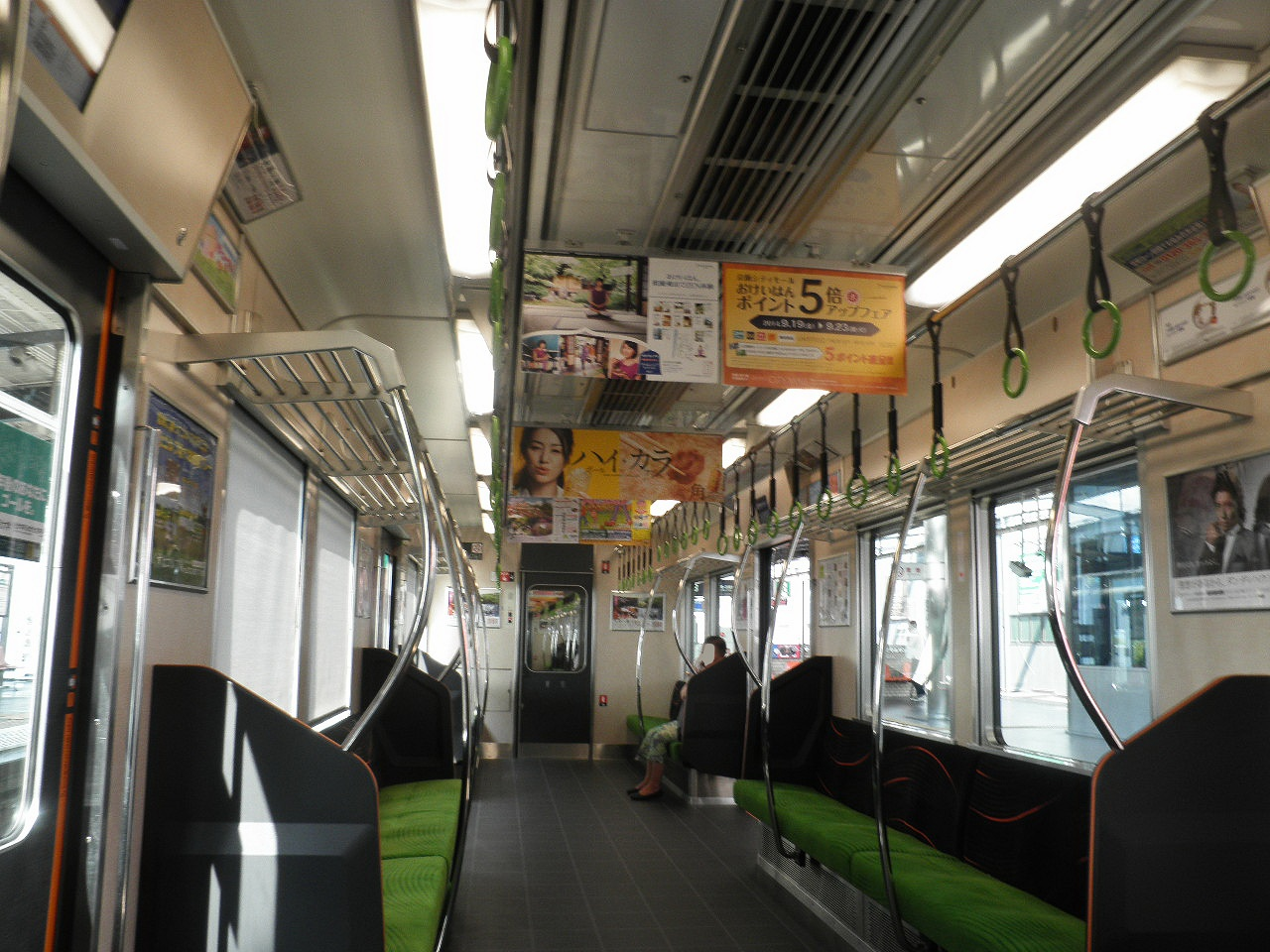
Refurbished interior, September 2014

Beginning in fiscal 2013, the 6000 series fleet has undergone a refurbishment programme. The refurbishment includes a redesigned interior based on that of the 13000 series, with wider bucket-style seats, audiovisual door warnings, internal LCD information displays, LED lighting throughout, and accessibility improvements. The first treated sets returned to service on 5 September 2014.

== Gallery ==
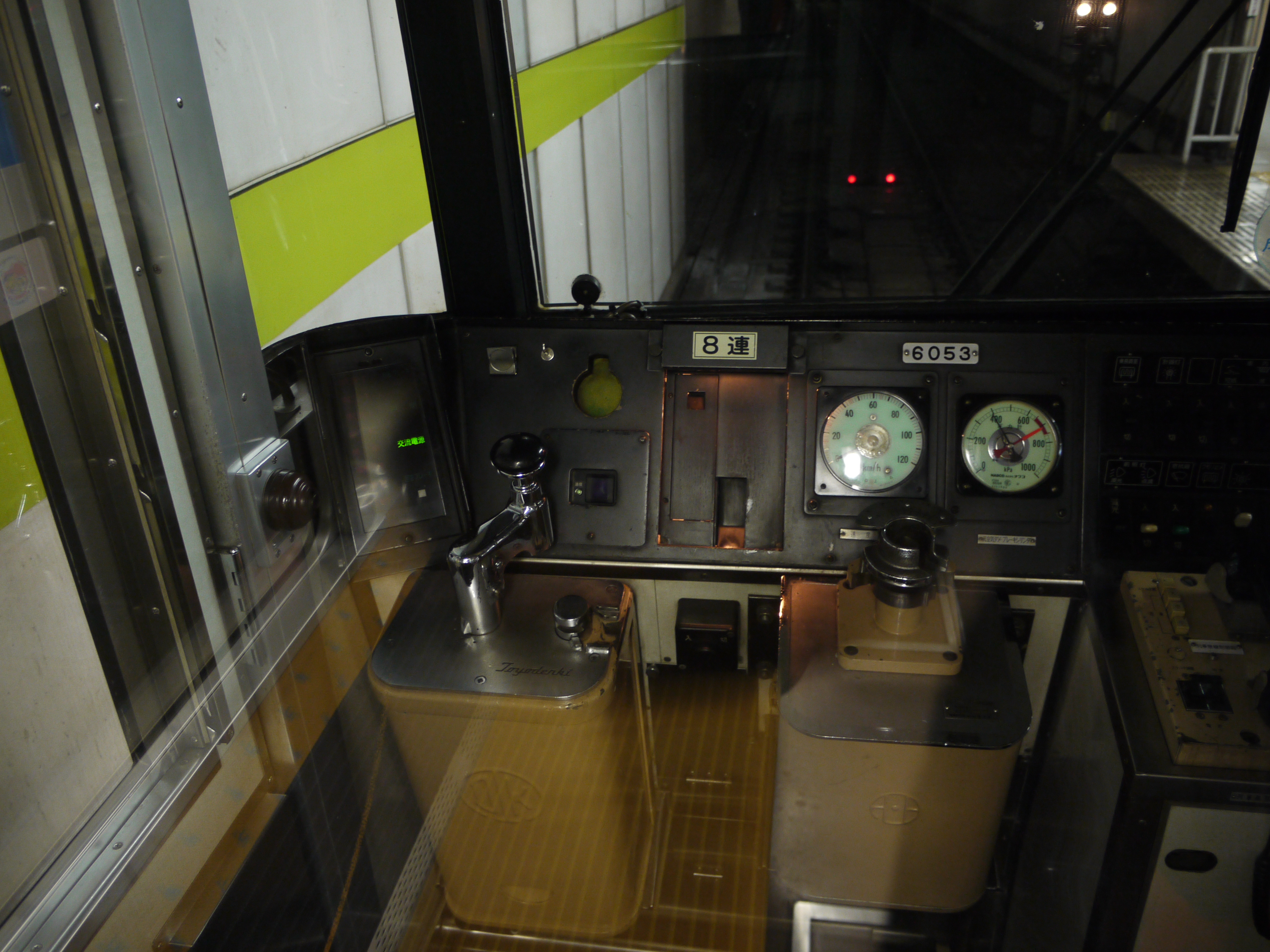
Driver controls of Keihan 6053

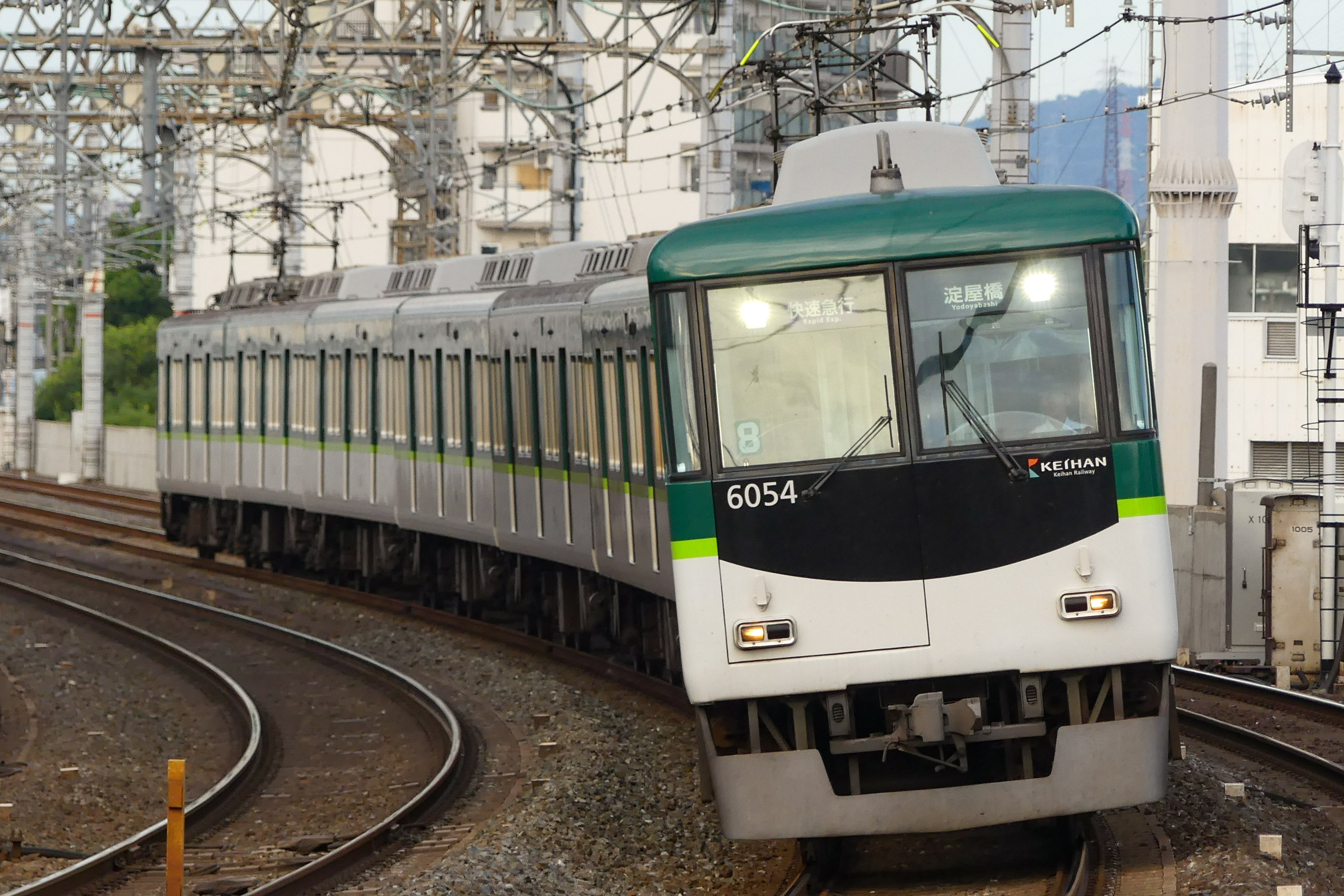
Set 6004 in September 2018

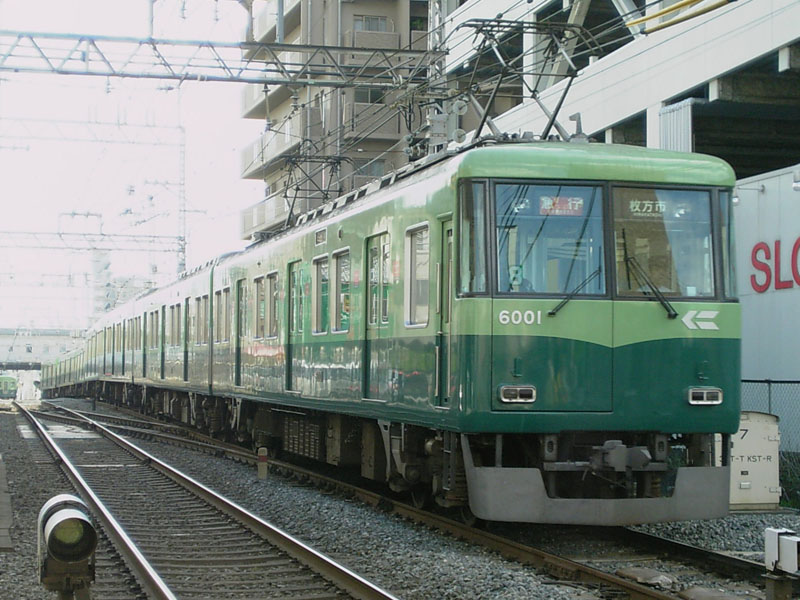
Keihan 6001 in an older green livery
