= Keihan 700 series =

Electric multiple unit train type operated in Japan since 1992

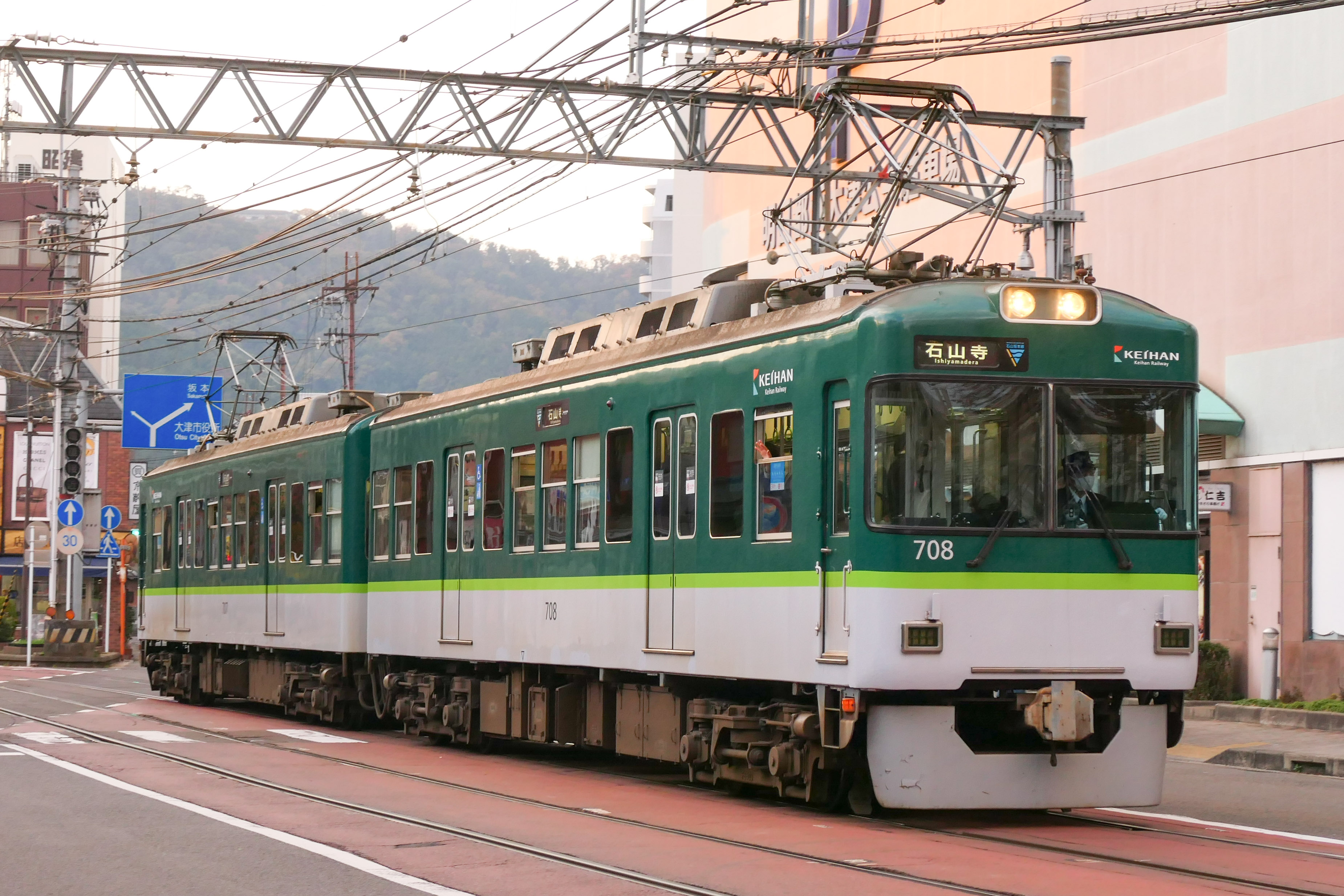
- Set 707 in November 2020
- Manufacturer: Keihan Electric Railway Nishigori factory
- Built at: Nishikori
- Constructed: 1992 - 1993
- Entered service: 1 May 1992
- Number built: 10 vehicles (5 sets)
- Number in service: 10 vehicles (5 sets)
- Formation: 2 cars per trainset
- Fleet numbers: 701–709
- Operator: Keihan Electric Railway
- Line served: Keihan Ishiyama Sakamoto Line

Specifications
- Car body construction: Steel
- Car length: 15,000 mm (49 ft 3 in)
- Width: 2,380 mm (7 ft 10 in)
- Height: 3,980 mm (13 ft 1 in)
- Doors: 2 pairs per side
- Maximum speed: 70 km/h (43 mph)
- Traction system: Field phase control
- Electric system: 1,500 V DC
- Current collection: Overhead wire
- Track gauge: 1,435 mm (4 ft 8 1/2 in)

The Keihan 700 series (京阪700系, Keihan 700-kei) is an electric multiple unit (EMU) commuter train type operated by the private railway operator Keihan Electric Railway on the Keihan Ishiyama Sakamoto Line in Japan since 1992.

== Interior ==
Passenger accommodation consists of a longitudinal bench seating.

== Formations ==
As of 1 April 2016, the fleet consists of five two-car sets (701 to 709), formed as follows. All cars are motored.

Designation	Mc1	Mc2
Numbering	70x	70x

Each car has one lozenge-type pantograph.

== History ==
The first trains entered service in 1992.

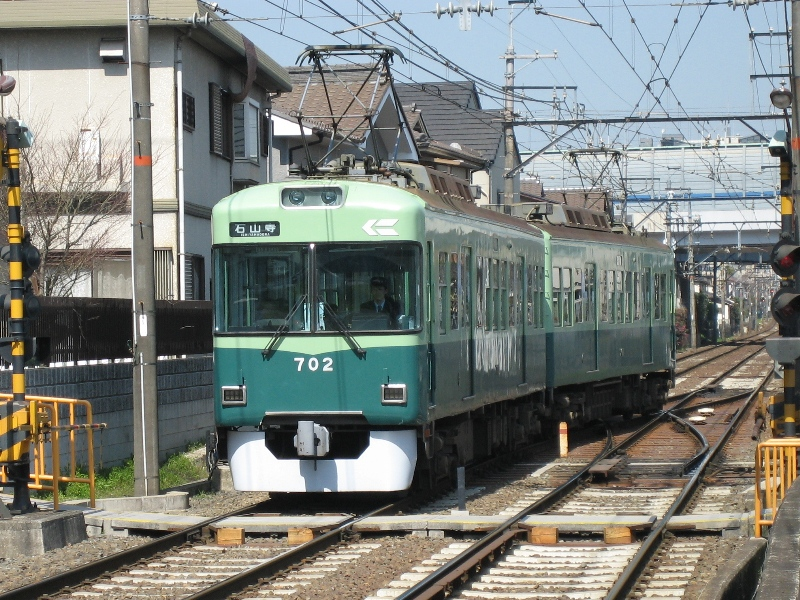
Set 701 in March 2006

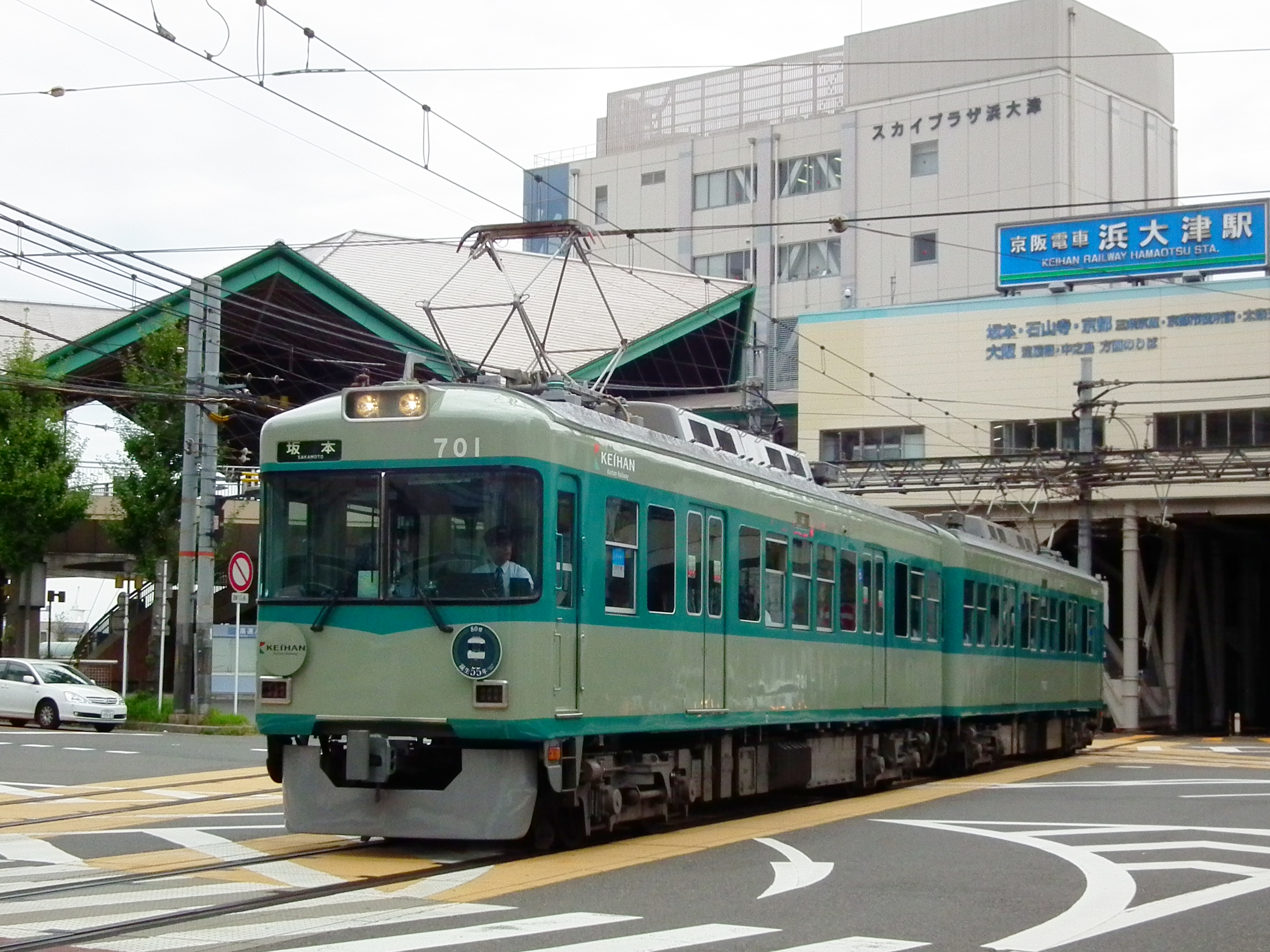
Set 701 in October 2016, repainted in old 80 series style livery

== Future developments ==
Between June 2017 and March 2021, the entire fleet of 700 series trains is scheduled to be repainted in the standard corporate Keihan Electric Railway livery of "rest green" on the upper body and "atmos white" on the lower body separated by a "fresh green" stripe.
