= Keihan 600 series =

Electric multiple unit train type operated in Japan since 1984

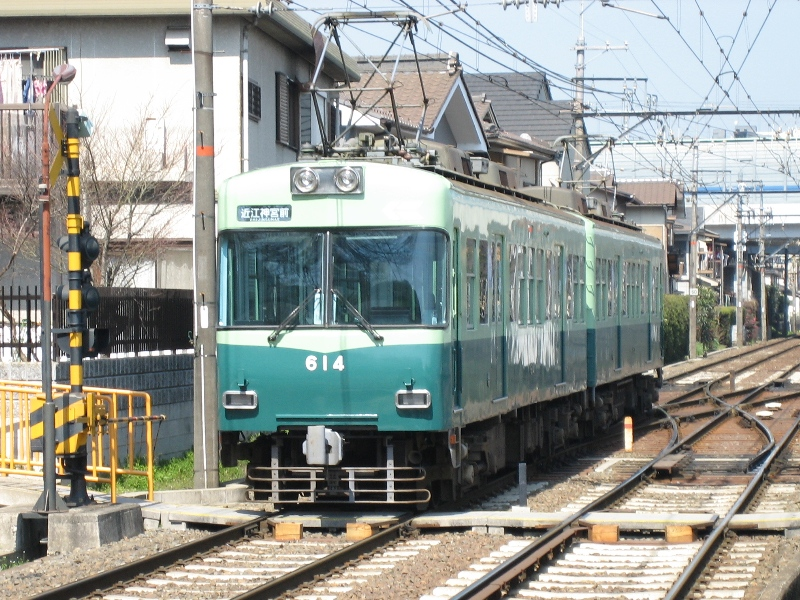
- Keihan 600 series set 613 in March 2006
- Manufacturer: Keihan Electric Railway Nishigori factory
- Built at: Nishikori
- Constructed: 1984 - 1988
- Entered service: 16 April 1984
- Number built: 20 vehicles (10 sets)
- Number in service: 20 vehicles (10 sets)
- Formation: 2 cars per trainset
- Fleet numbers: 601–619
- Operator: Keihan Electric Railway
- Line served: Keihan Ishiyama Sakamoto Line

Specifications
- Car body construction: Steel
- Car length: 15,000 mm (49 ft 3 in)
- Width: 2,380 mm (7 ft 10 in)
- Height: 3,980 mm (13 ft 1 in)
- Doors: 2 pairs per side
- Maximum speed: 70 km/h (43 mph)
- Traction system: Field phase control
- Electric system: 1,500 V DC
- Current collection: Overhead wire
- Track gauge: 1,435 mm (4 ft 8 1/2 in)

The Keihan 600 series (京阪600系, Keihan 600-kei) is an electric multiple unit (EMU) commuter train type operated by the private railway operator Keihan Electric Railway on the Keihan Ishiyama Sakamoto Line in Japan since 1984.

== Interior ==
Passenger accommodation consists of a longitudinal bench seating.

== Formations ==
As of 1 April 2016, the fleet consists of ten two-car sets (601 to 619), formed as follows. All cars are motored.

Designation	Mc1	Mc2
Numbering	60x	60x

Each car has one lozenge-type pantograph.

== History ==
The first trains entered service in 1984.

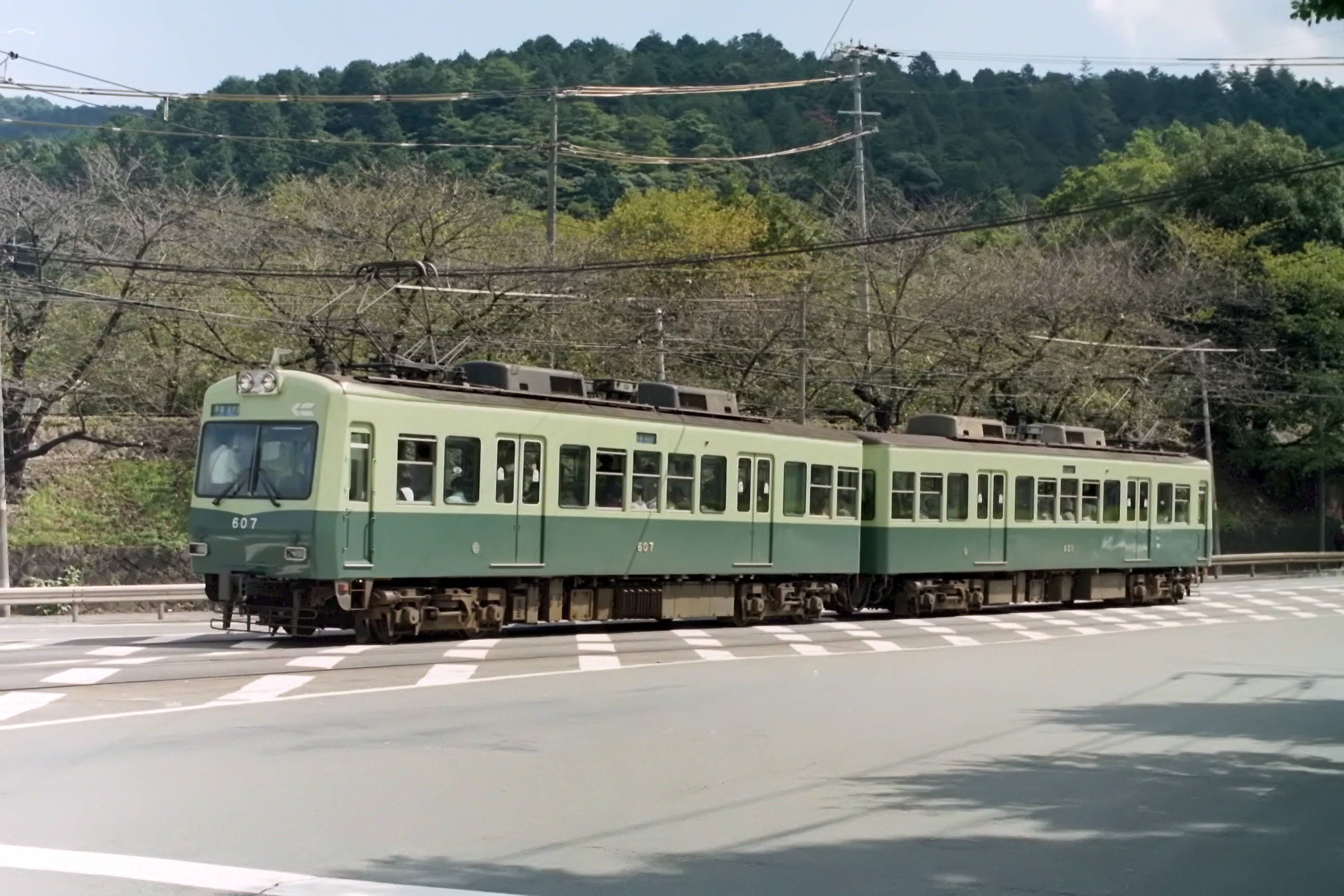
Set 607 in 1997

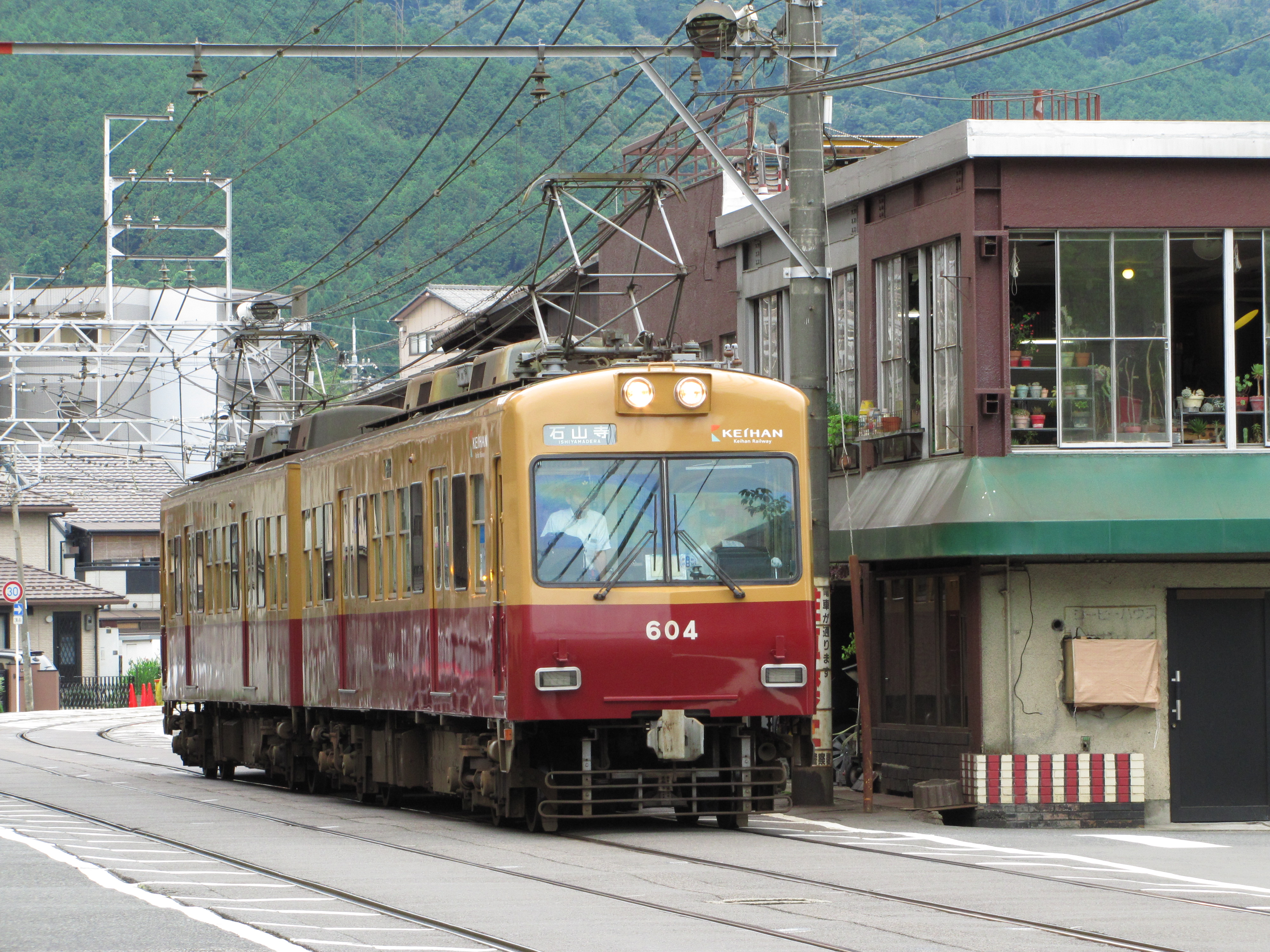
Set 603 in Keihan limited express livery in 2014, specially repainted to mark the 100th anniversary of the Otsu Line

== Future developments ==
Between 2017 and March 2021, the entire fleet of 600 series trains is scheduled to be repainted in the standard corporate Keihan Electric Railway livery of "rest green" on the upper body and "atmos white" on the lower body separated by a "fresh green" stripe.
