= Keihan Electric Railway =

Japanese railway company

Overview
- Headquarters: Osaka, Japan (Registered in Hirakata, Osaka Prefecture, Japan)
- Locale: Kansai region, Japan
- Dates of operation: 1910–

Technical
- Track gauge: 1,435 mm (4 ft 8 1/2 in)
- Length: 91.1 km (56.6 mi)

Other
- Website: Keihan Electric Railway

The Keihan Electric Railway Company, Ltd. (Japanese: 京阪電気鉄道株式会社, Hepburn: Keihan Denki Tetsudō Kabushiki-gaisha), known colloquially as the "Keihan Dentetsu" (京阪電鉄), "Keihan Densha" (京阪電車), or simply "Keihan" (京阪), is a major Japanese private railway operator in Osaka, Kyoto, and Shiga Prefectures. The transit network includes seven lines; four main lines with heavy rolling stock, two interurban lines, and a funicular railway.

It is a subsidiary of Keihan Holdings, Ltd. (TYO: 9045).

== History ==
Keihan started its operation between Osaka and Kyoto in 1910. It was the first electric railway to connect these two cities, and the first line on the left bank of Yodo River. Keihan later purchased the lines in the Ōtsu area (Ōtsu Lines).

In the 1920s, Keihan built another Osaka-Kyoto line through its subsidiary Shinkeihan Railway (新京阪鉄道, Shin-keihan-tetsudō), which merged into Keihan in 1930. This line is now known as the Hankyu Kyoto Line.

In 1943, with the power given by the Land Transport Business Coordination Act (陸上交通事業調整法, rikujō-kōtsū-jigyō-chōsei-hō) (Act No. 71 of 1938), the wartime government of Japan forced Keihan to merge with Hanshin Kyūkō Railway to form Keihanshin Kyūkō Railway (京阪神急行電鉄, Keihanshin Kyūkō Dentetsu). In 1949, the pre-war Keihan operations, except for Shinkeihan lines, were restored to independence under the original corporate name. Keihanshin Kyūkō Railway later changed their name to the present Hankyu Railway.

== Lines ==
The lines operated by Keihan are grouped into Keihan Lines and Ōtsu Lines. The Keihan Lines consist of the Keihan Main Line and four branch lines that operate between Kyoto and Osaka; these use long formations of heavy rolling stock. The two Ōtsu Lines are interurbans, featuring street running sections and tram-like rolling stock; these operate between Kyoto and Ōtsu and are otherwise disconnected from the Keihan lines. The entire network is built in 1,435 mm (4 ft 8 1/2 in) standard gauge double track.

Additionally, Keihan Electric Railway operates a funicular railway in Yawata which provides access to Iwashimizu Shrine.

=== Current lines ===
==== Keihan Lines ====
- Keihan Main Line/Ōtō Line: Yodoyabashi - Demachiyanagi
- Nakanoshima Line: Nakanoshima - Temmabashi
- Katano Line: Hirakatashi - Kisaichi
- Uji Line: Chushojima - Uji

==== Ōtsu Lines ====
- Keishin Line: Misasagi - Biwako-hamaotsu
- Ishiyama Sakamoto Line: Ishiyamadera - Sakamoto-hieizanguchi

==== Other lines ====
- Cable Line (鋼索線), also called Iwashimizu-Hachimangū Cable (石清水八幡宮参道ケーブル)

=== Closed lines ===
- Keishin Line: Keishin-Sanjo (Sanjo) - Misasagi

=== Unbuilt line ===
- Umeda Line

== Rolling stock ==
As of 1 April 2016, Keihan owns a fleet of 693 vehicles (including two funicular cars), as follows.

=== Keihan Lines ===
- 1000 series 7-car EMUs x 6 (introduced 1977)
- 2200 series 7-car EMUs x 7 (introduced 1964)
- 2400 series 7-car EMUs x 6 (introduced 1969)
- 2600 series 7-car EMUs x 7 (introduced 1978)
- 3000 series 8-car EMUs x 6 (introduced 2008)
- 5000 series 7-car EMUs x 7 (introduced 1970)
- 6000 series 7/8-car EMUs x 14 (introduced 1983)
- 7000 series 7-car EMUs x 4 (introduced 1989)
- 7200 series 7/8-car EMUs x 3 (introduced 1995)
- 8000 series 8-car EMUs x 10 (introduced 1989)
- 9000 series 7/8-car EMUs x 5 (introduced 1997)
- 10000 series 4/7-car EMUs x 6 (introduced 2002)
- 13000 series 4/7-car EMUs x 8 (introduced 2012)
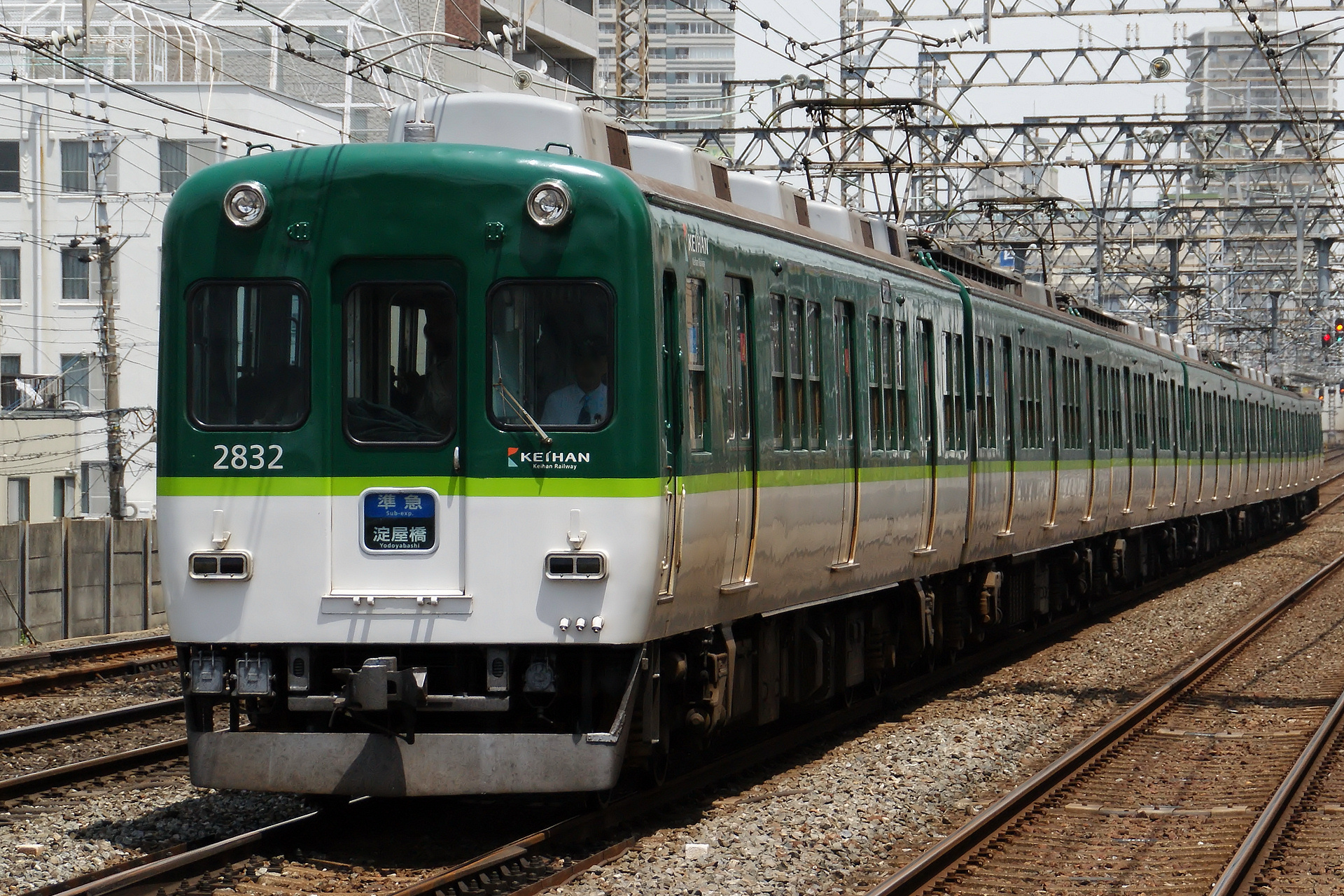
Keihan 2600 series

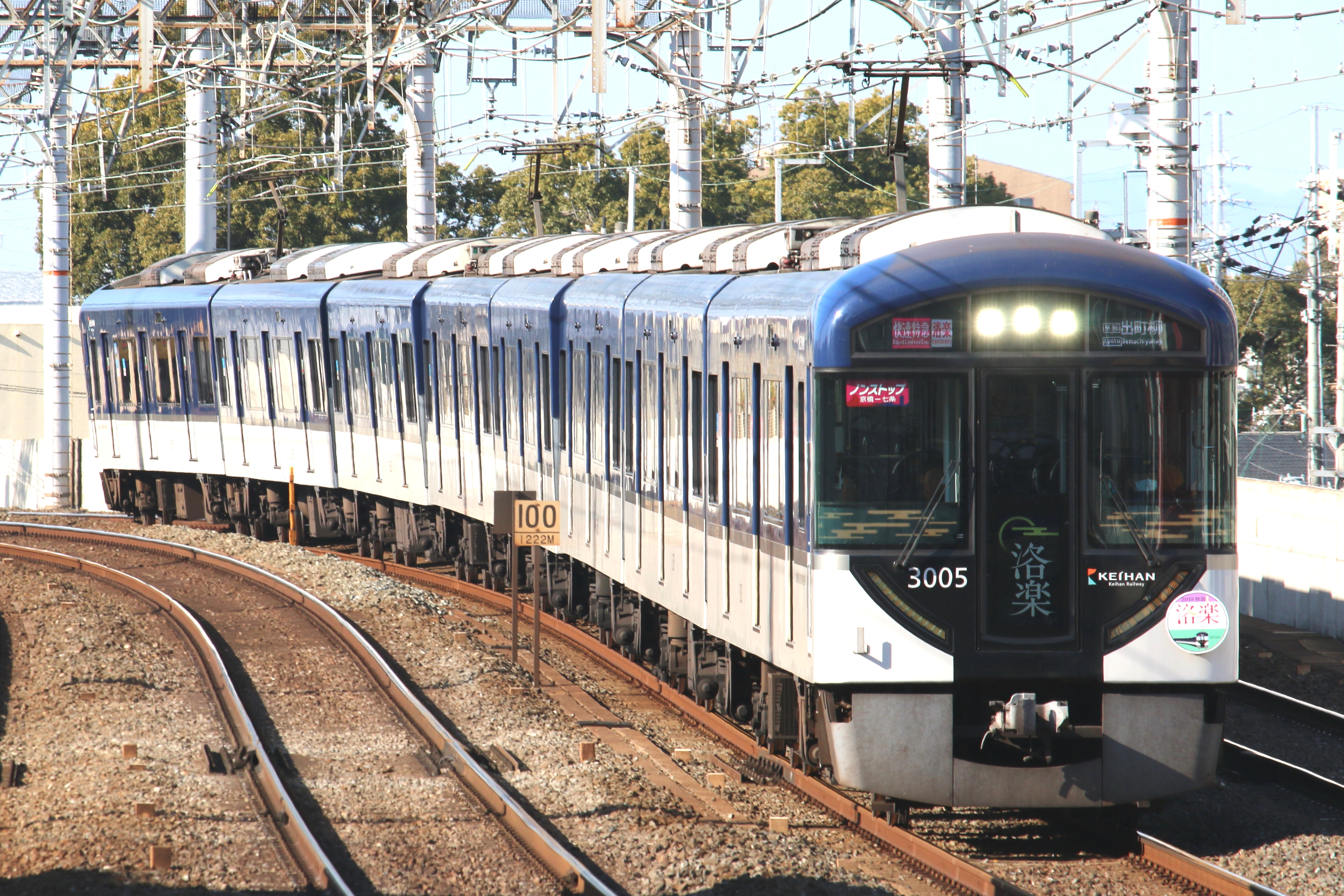
Keihan 3000 series

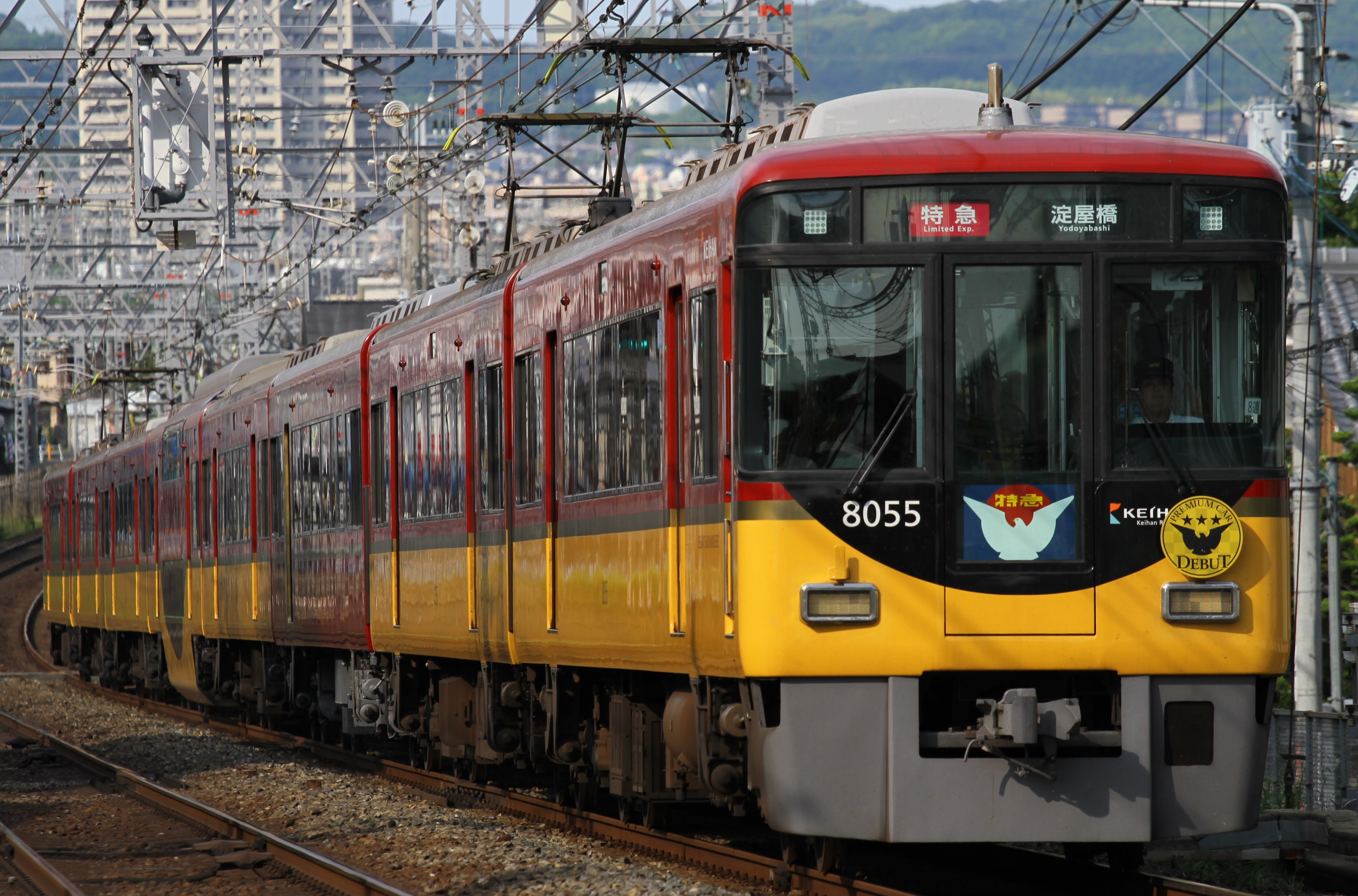
Keihan 8000 series

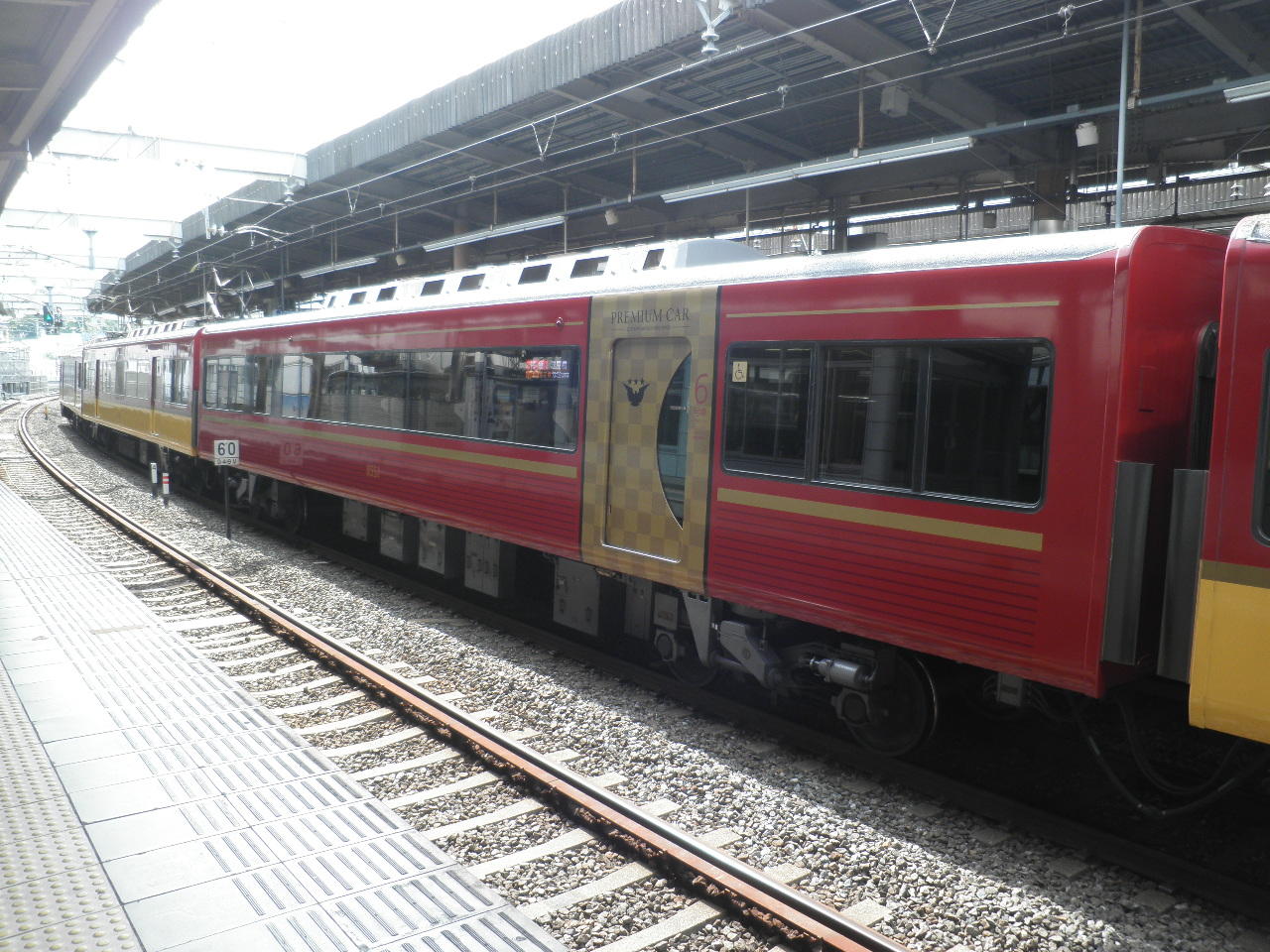
Keihan 8000 series Premium car

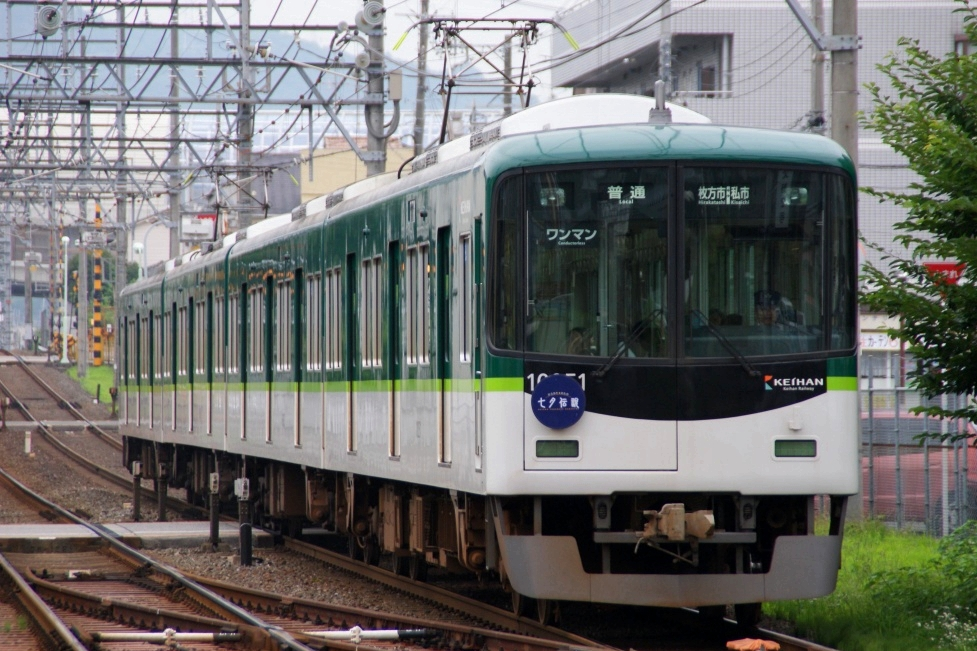
Keihan 10000 series

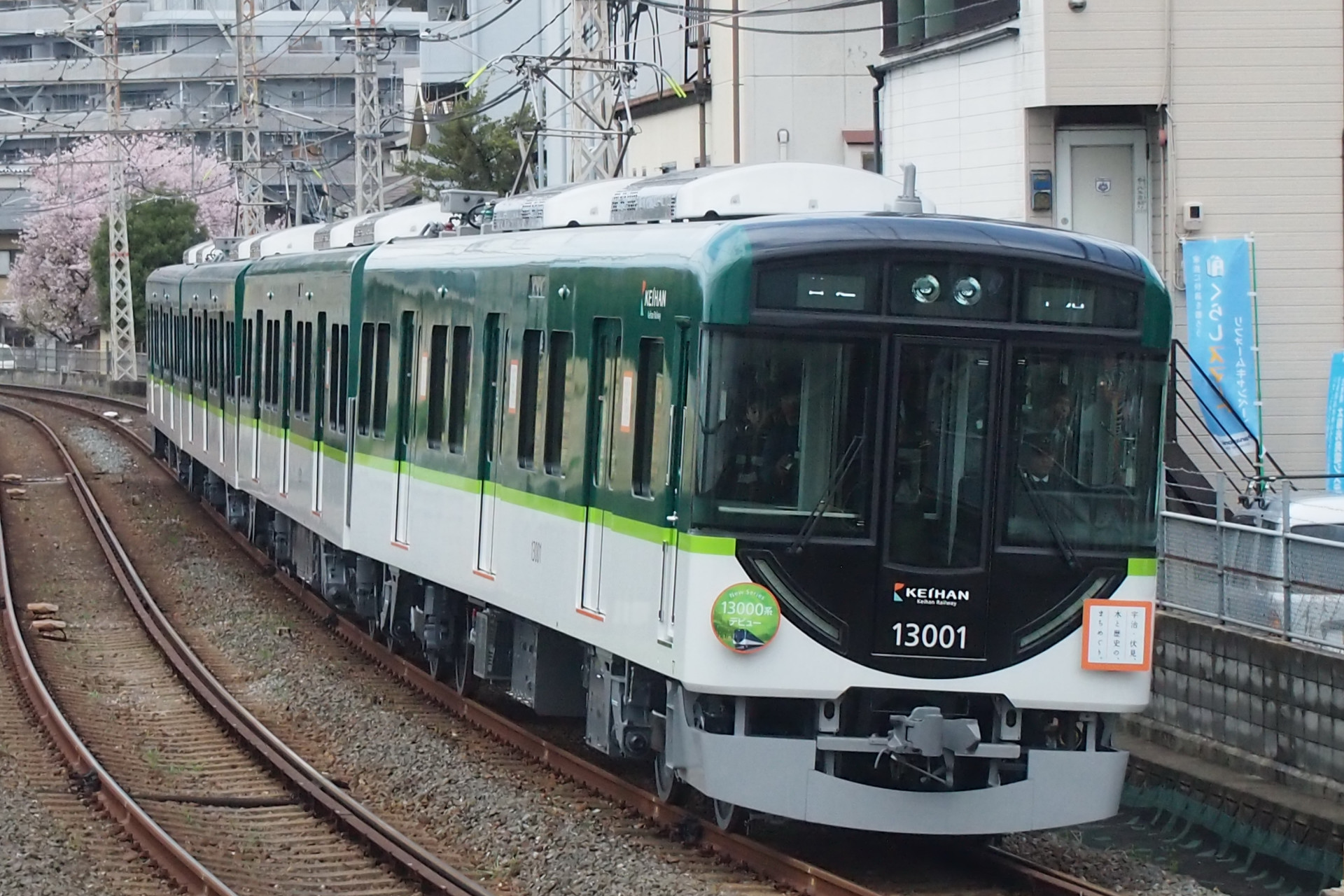
Keihan 13000 series

=== Ōtsu Lines ===
- 600 series 2-car EMUs x 10
- 700 series 2-car EMUs x 5
- 800 series 4-car EMUs x 8 (introduced 1997)
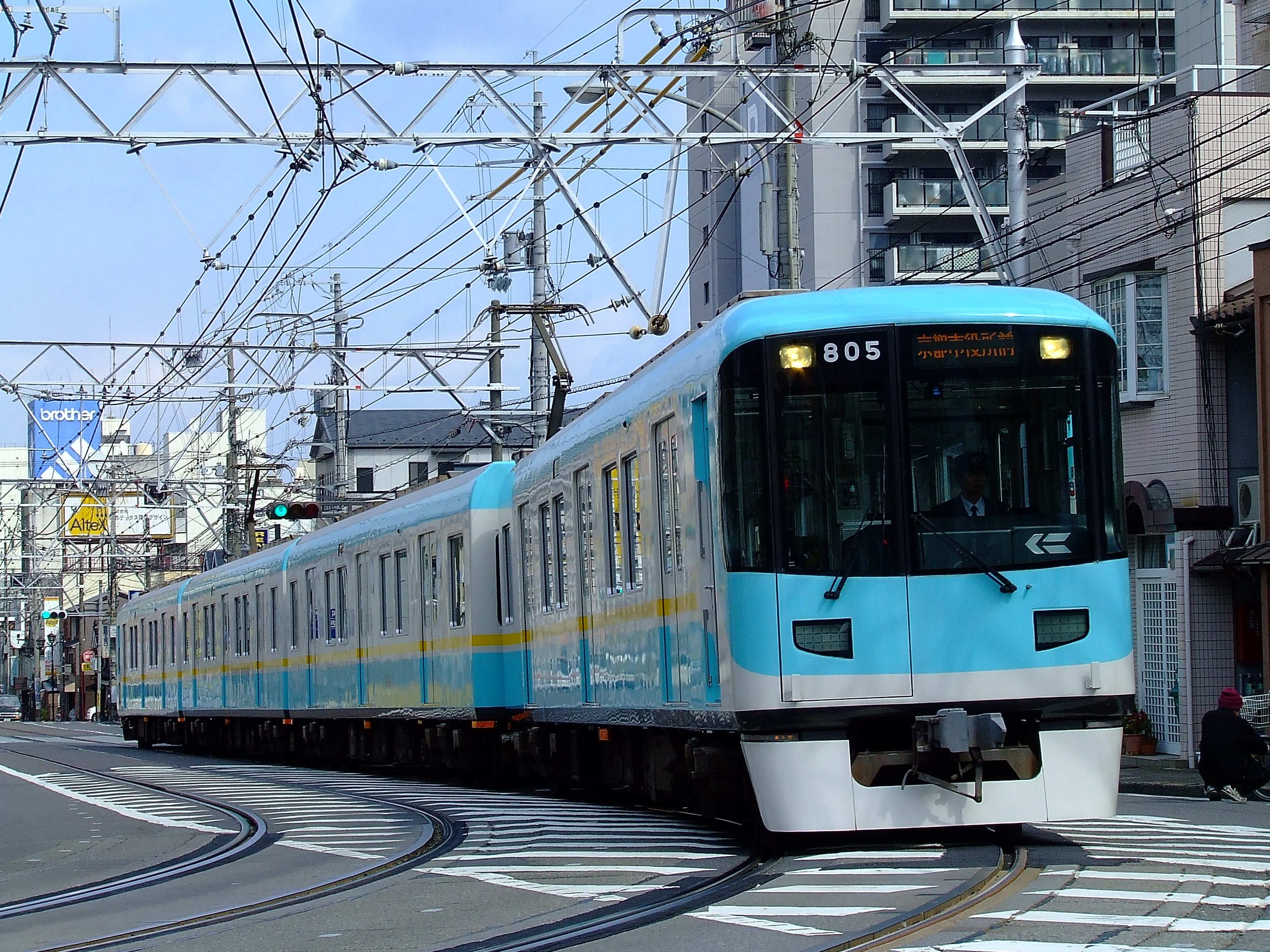
Keihan 800 series

=== Former rolling stock ===
- 1900 series 5-car EMUs (introduced 1963)
- 8030 series 8-car EMU (introduced 1971)

== Fares ==
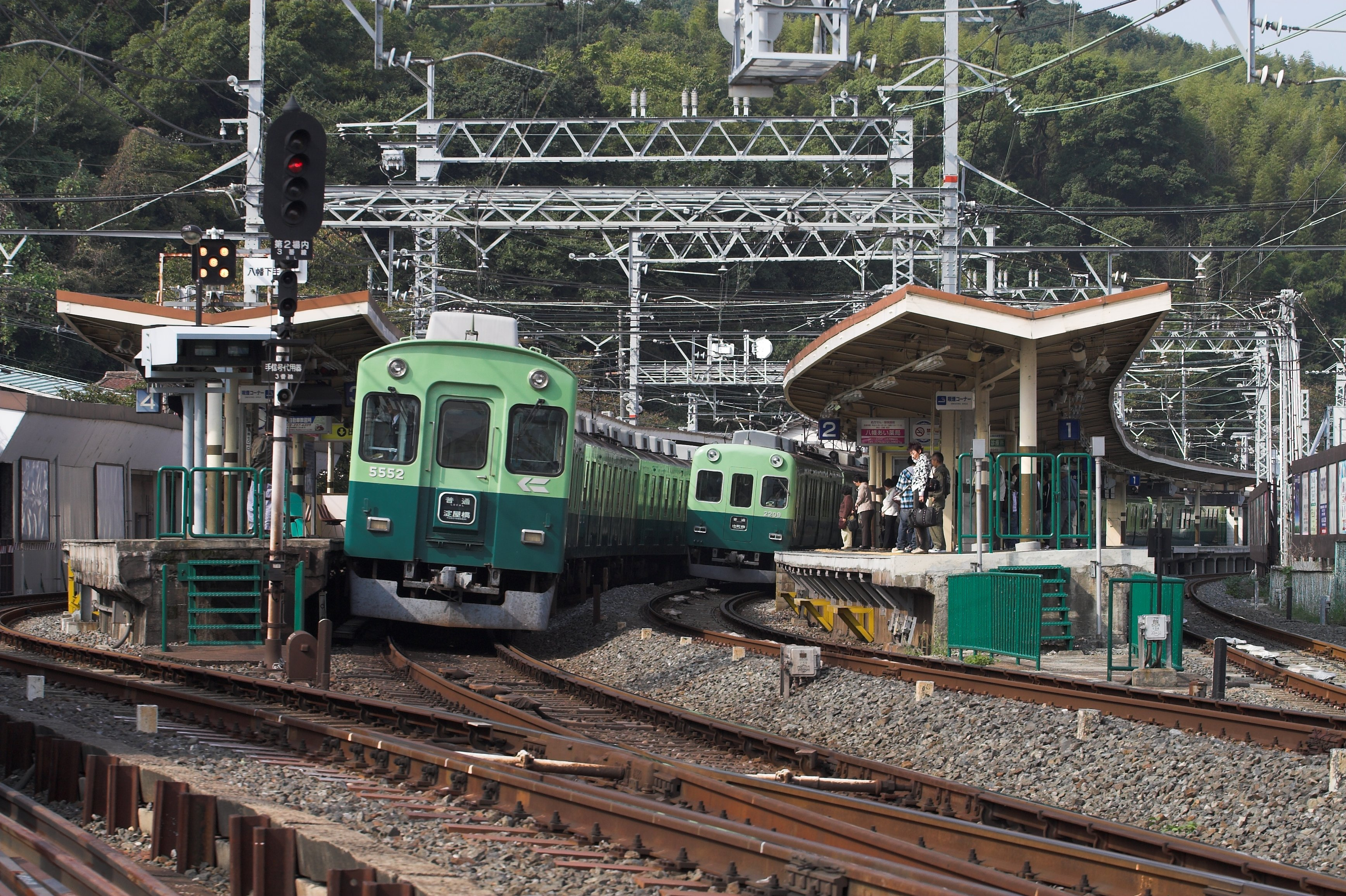
Yawatashi Station

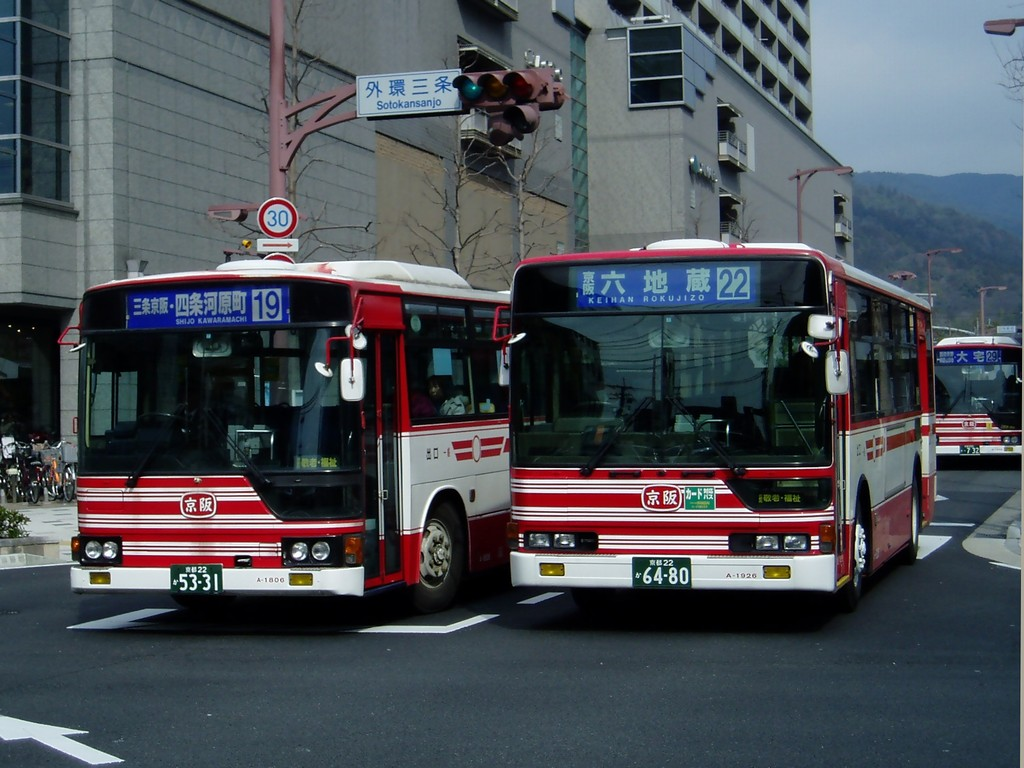
Keihan Bus

As standard for railways in Japan, fares are distance-based. Fares have been repeatedly raised over time, most recently on October 1, 2025.

Fares can be paid with IC cards, such as ICOCA and PiTaPa, on all lines.

=== Keihan Lines (Keihan Main Line, Oto Line, Nakanoshima Line, Katano Line, Uji Line) ===
Distance (km)	Fare (JPY)
1–3	180
4–7	240
8–12	320
13–17	360
18–22	400
23–28	420
29–34	440
35–40	460
41–46	480
47–52	490
53–54	500

- Additional fare when taking or passing the following lines:
  - Nakanoshima Line, Oto Line: 60 yen
- When using commuter passes, Naniwabashi Station is treated as the same station as Kitahama Station, and Ōebashi Station the same as Yodoyabashi Station.

=== Otsu Lines (Keishin Line, Ishiyama Sakamoto Line) ===
Distance (km)	Fare (JPY)
1–5	200
6–10	280
11–15	380

=== Cable Line ===
300 yen each way.

== Etymology ==
The name Keihan, which is also used for the Kyoto–Osaka region, is derived from the words Kyoto and Osaka in Japanese, and is a clipped compound of the names, with the reading of the characters changed: Kyōto (京都) and Ōsaka (大阪) are combined to Keihan (京阪), replacing the go-on reading kyō (京) and kun'yomi saka (阪) with the kan-on readings kei (京) and han (阪). This is commonly done in names for regions or train lines, with kan-on readings (the most common readings in kanji compounds) being used for the compounds, while place names use other readings. The larger region, including Kobe (神戸, Kōbe), is similarly called Keihanshin (京阪神, Keihanshin), the go-on reading shin (神) replacing the kun'yomi kō (神), and the corresponding Kyoto-Kobe line is the Keishin (京神, Keishin) line.

== Other businesses ==
Keihan also operates (through its subsidiaries) other businesses such as bus, taxi, water bus, hotel, department store and amusement park, mainly in the area along its railway system.

- Keihan Cable Line
- Keihan Bus
- Osaka Suijo Bus
