= Keihan 7000 series =

Japanese train type

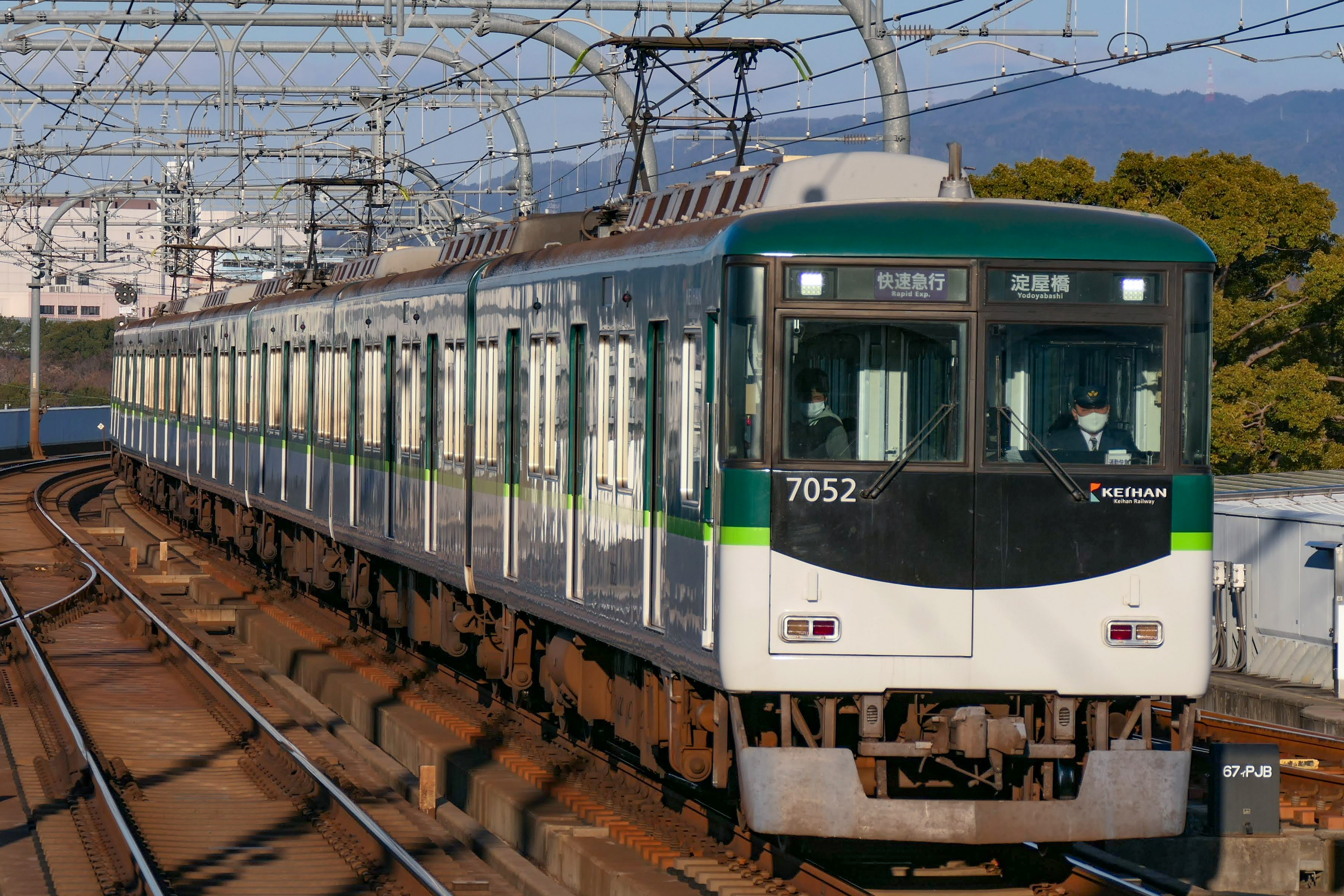
- Set 7002 in January 2021
- In service: 1989–
- Manufacturer: Kawasaki Heavy Industries
- Family name: City commuter
- Constructed: 1989–1993
- Entered service: 11 September 1989
- Refurbished: 2024–
- Number built: 28 vehicles (4 sets)
- Number in service: 28 vehicles
- Formation: 7 cars per trainset
- Fleet numbers: 7001–7004
- Capacity: 130 (end cars); 140 (intermediate cars)
- Operator: Keihan Electric Railway
- Lines served: Keihan Main Line; Keihan Nakanoshima Line; Keihan Ōtō Line

Specifications
- Car body construction: Aluminium
- Train length: 130,900 mm (429 ft 6 in)
- Car length: 18,700 mm (61 ft 4 in)
- Width: 2,780 mm (9 ft 1 in)
- Height: 4,185 mm (13 ft 8.8 in)
- Doors: 3 pairs per side
- Maximum speed: 110 km/h (68 mph) (service); 120 km/h (75 mph) (design)
- Traction system: Variable frequency (GTO)
- Power output: 4× 200 kW (270 hp)
- Acceleration: 2.8 km/(h⋅s) (1.7 mph/s)
- Deceleration: 4.0 km/(h⋅s) (2.5 mph/s) (operation); 4.5 km/(h⋅s) (2.8 mph/s) (emergency)
- Electric system: 1,500 V DC
- Current collection: Overhead wire
- Safety system: Keihan ATS
- Track gauge: 1,435 mm (4 ft 8 1/2 in)

The Keihan 7000 series (京阪7000系, Keihan 7000-kei) is an electric multiple unit (EMU) commuter train type operated by the private railway operator Keihan Electric Railway in Kyoto, Japan, since 1989.

== Overview ==
The 7000 series was introduced in 1989 with two six-car sets and one four-car set. The remaining nine cars would be built between 1991 and 1993.

In 1993, three test 6000 series vehicles would be renumbered and incorporated into a fourth seven-car set.

These trains would be the basis for the 7000 series introduced in 1992.

Between 2006 and 2008, the sets received accessibility upgrades, such as wheelchair spaces.

A refurbishment programme for the 7000 series fleet was announced in January 2024. The refurbishment includes a redesigned interior based on that of the 13000 series, audible door warnings, internal LCD information displays, LED lighting, updated control equipment, and full-colour LED destination displays. The first treated set, 7002, returned to service on 21 January of that year. The entire fleet was scheduled to be refurbished by fiscal year 2025.

== Interior ==
Passenger accommodation consists of longitudinal bench seating throughout.

== Formations ==
The seven-car trains are formed as follows, with three motored ("M") cars and four non-powered trailer ("T") cars.

Sets 7001–7003
Designation	Mc	T	T	M	T	T	Mc
Numbering	7000	7500	7600	7150	7650	7550	7050

Set 7004
Designation	Mc	T	M	T	T	T	Mc
Numbering	7004	7504	7104	7604	7554	7654	7054

- "Mc" cars are motored driving cars (with driving cabs).
- "M" cars are motored intermediate cars.
- "T" cars are unpowered trailer cars.
- The "Mc" and "M" cars each have one scissors-type pantograph along with the "7150" car.

== Gallery ==
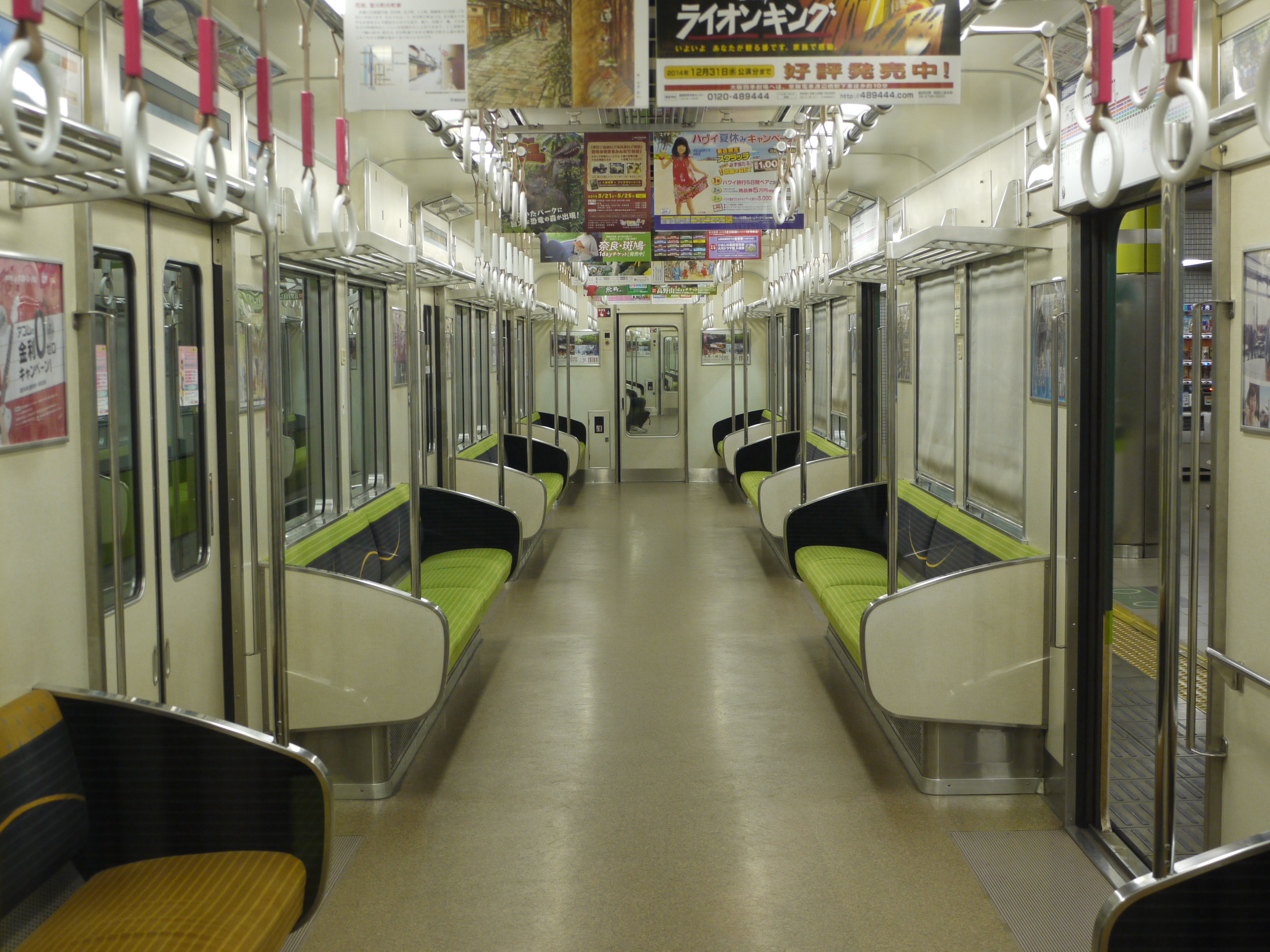
Inside a 7000 series train

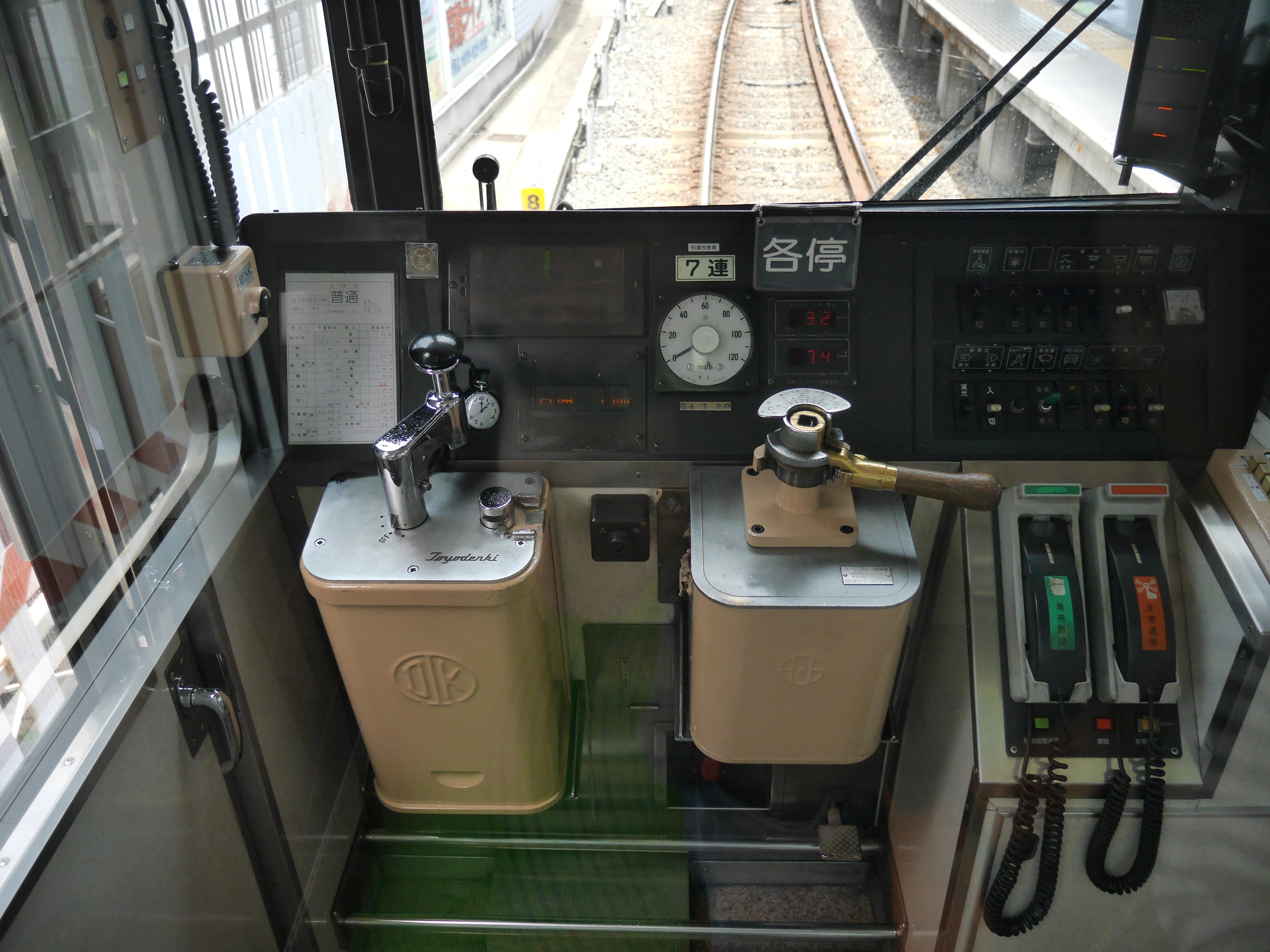
Cabin of car 7001

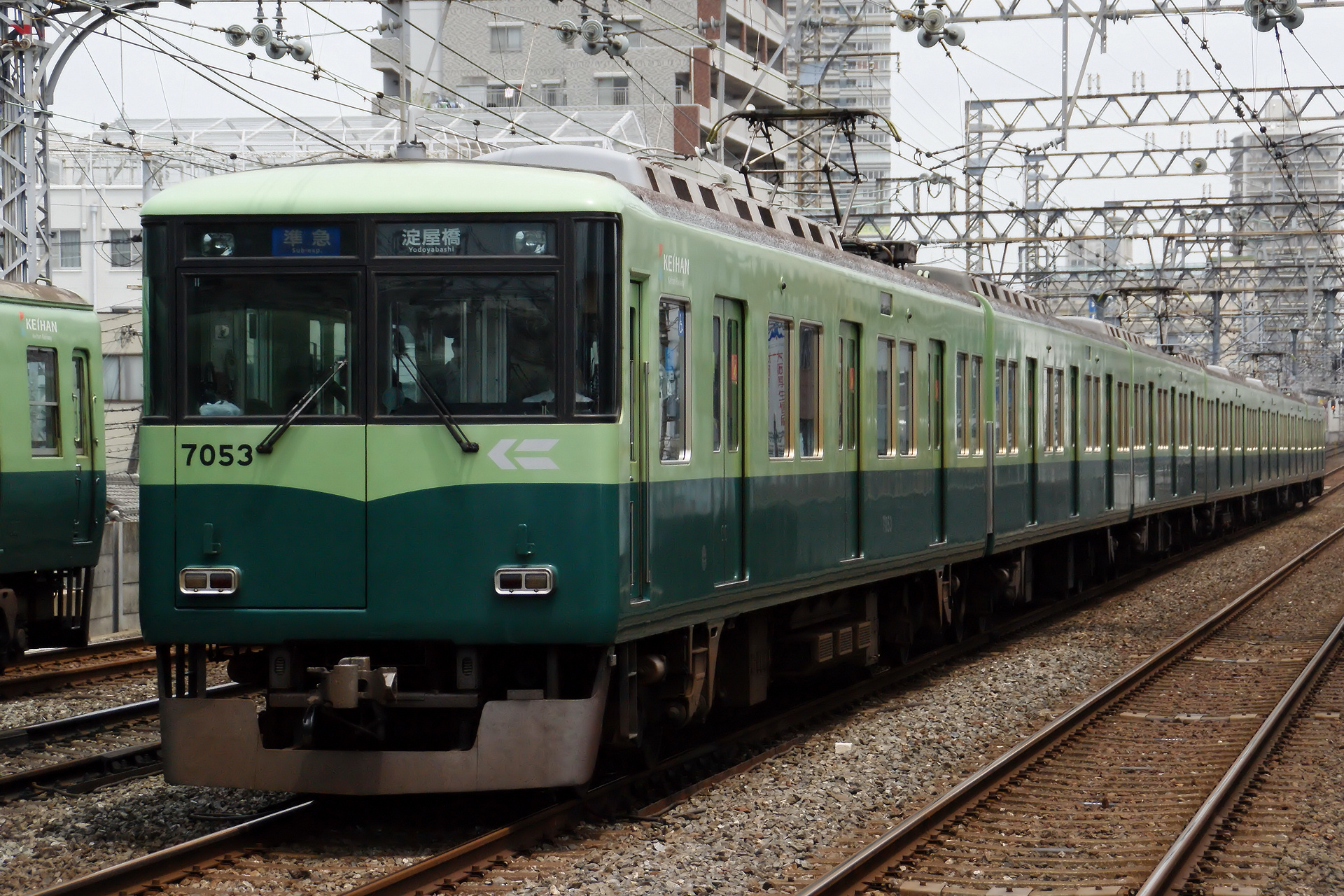
Keihan 7053 in an older green livery

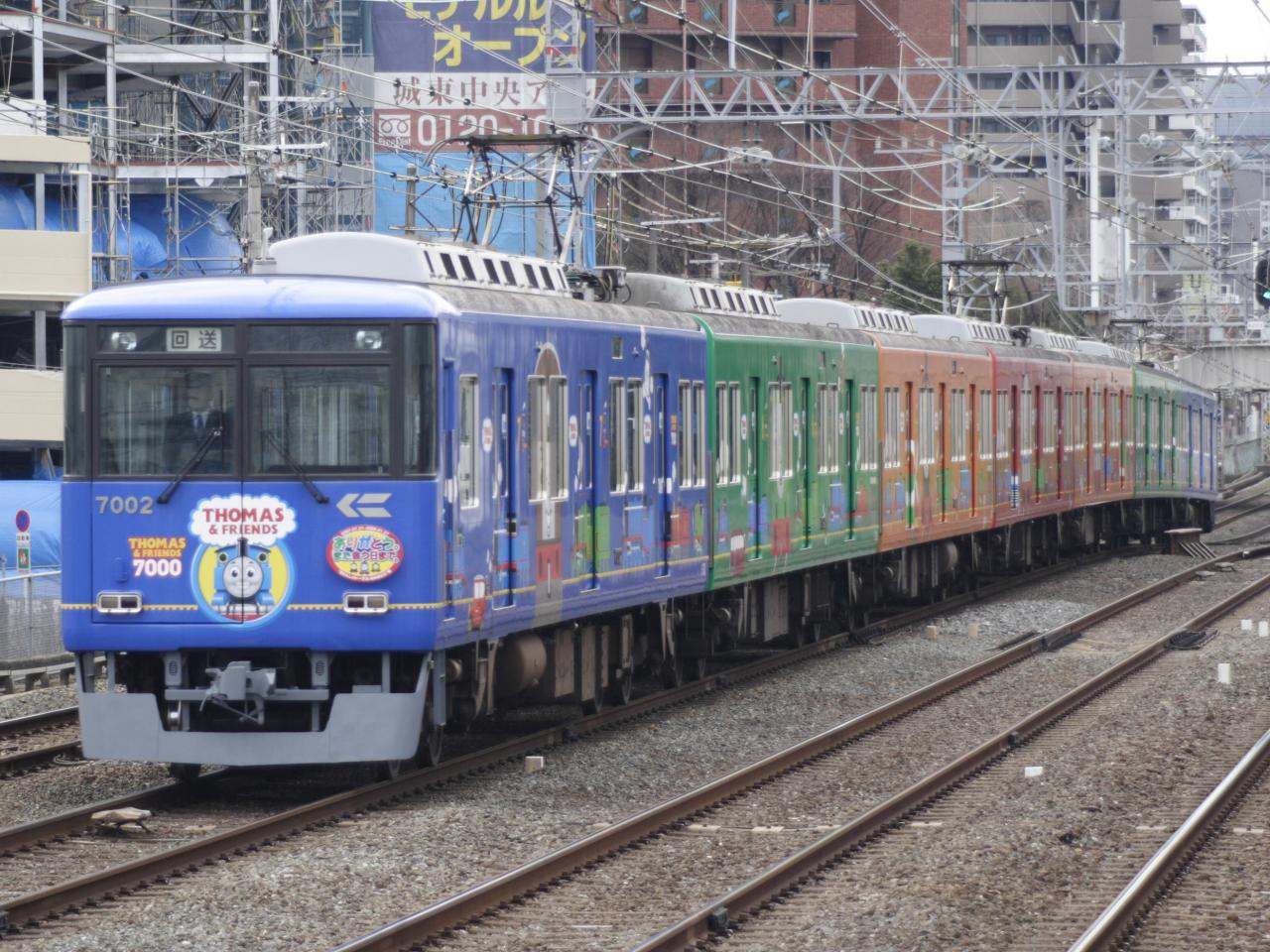
Set 7002 campaigning for Thomas & Friends in 2008

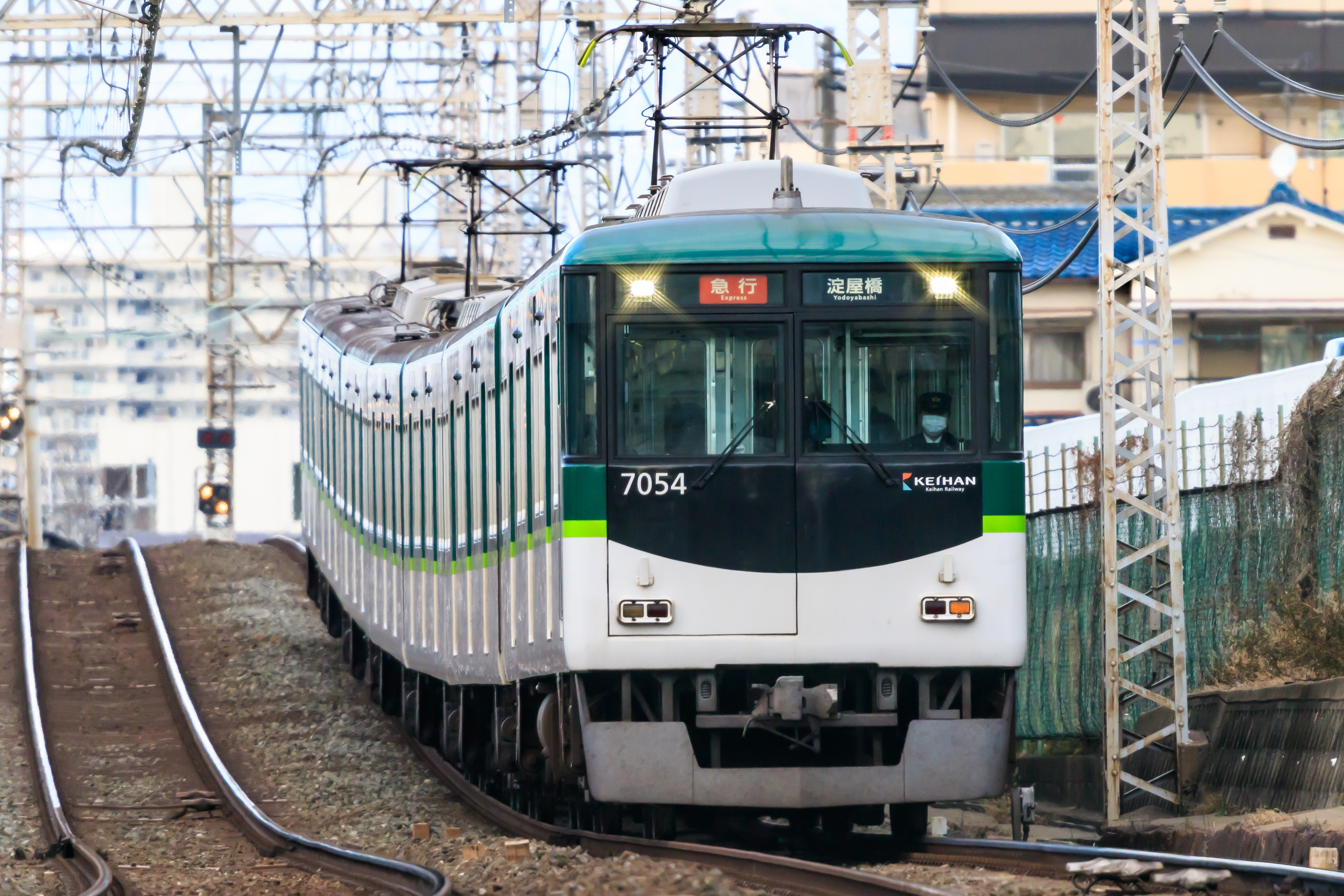
Keihan 7054 on a service to Yodoyabashi
