= Ongakukan =

Japanese simulator and music production company

- Founded: September 1985; 40 years ago
- Headquarters: Kanagawa Prefecture, Kawasaki City, Saiwai Ward, Horikawacho 66-2; Kowa Kawasaki Nishiguchi Building, 10th floor 35°32′9.6″N 139°42′5.1″E, Japan
- Key people: Minoru Mukaiya, President and CEO
- Products: Music production development and production of commercial simulators
- Website: www.ongakukan.co.jp

Ongakukan Co., Ltd. (Japanese: 株式会社音楽館, Hepburn: Kabushiki gaisha Ongakukan; stylized in all caps) is a Japanese company whose main business is music production and the planning, development, and production of commercial simulators. Its head office is located in Saiwai-ku, Kawasaki, Kanagawa Prefecture.

== Overview ==
Minoru Mukaiya, keyboardist of the fusion band Casiopea, founded the company in 1985 as a company that rented out recording equipment to professional recording studios. In 1993, they produced the CD-ROM software "Touch the Music by Casiopea", which combined video and music, and then moved into the computer software field. In August 1995, they released the game softwareTrain Simulator for personal computers, which was based on Mukaiya's childhood dream of driving a train, and this became the core of their business. The series has a total of 31 titles, including PC and home console versions.

From October 1, 2005, they took over the operation of the railway fan site "Railfan" (all services ended at the end of August 2019) from Tokyu Corporation.

Train Simulator is not limited to the field of consumer games, and in 2006 they started producing commercial simulators. They received an order from Tokyu Corporation and Tokyu Technosystem to develop a simulator to be used in actual crew training. The simulator can also simulate emergencies, such as a person jumping onto the tracks in the event of a fatal accident.

In the same year they moved to the PlayStation 3 platform and released the video game Railfan. The name was taken from the company's website "Railfan", and the title was changed from the previous Train Simulator, but the series ended with two titles, including Railfan Taiwan High Speed Rail released in 2007. After that, the company shifted to producing commercial simulators for railway companies and museums.

In 2007 they produced a simulator for the Japanese National Railways D51 steam locomotive for the Railway Museum (Saitama City). It took about three years to develop this world's first full-scale steam locomotive simulator. It also reproduces the shaking caused by the shaking device, and in addition to driving by a locomotive driver, you can also experience coal being thrown and water being fed by a fireman or an assistant engineer.

Since then they have supplied simulators for display at the Train and Bus Museum, the Railway Museum (Saitama City), the Railway Museum, Kidzania Koshien, Tobu Museum, Kyushu Railway Memorial Museum, Kuzuha Mall SANZEN-HIROBA, Misaki Park Wakuwaku Train Land, and East Japan Railway Company E5 Series Shinkansen simulators, and have also developed simulators for the Malaysian Railway Company and Kyushu Railway Company for crew training.

After leaving Casiopea in 2012, Mukaiya became the head of Ongakukan.

On January 21, 2013, the company moved its headquarters from Kamiuma, Setagaya, Tokyo, to Higashi-Gotanda, Shinagawa.

In 2016 the company came up with the idea of a lightweight platform door, with movable parts made of pipes and staggered doors when stored to make the door pocket more compact. It was put to practical use through joint development with Nippon Signal.

In 2017 the company moved its headquarters to the TOC Building in Nishi-Gotanda, Shinagawa Ward.

In November 2017 a lightweight platform door was trial-installed at Kyudai-Gakkentoshi Station on the Chikuhi Line of Kyushu Railway Company (JR Kyushu).

In September 2022 the company announced the release of JR East Train Simulator, a consumer version of the JR East commercial simulator. For the time being, it is scheduled to be distributed only on the Steam distribution service, and the target hardware will be PC only. In the early access version, users can experience the Keihin Tohoku Line and Hachiko Line.

On March 20, 2023, the company moved its headquarters to Saiwai-ku, Kawasaki City, Kanagawa Prefecture.

== Works ==
=== Games ===
- Train Simulator series
- Railfan (video game) series
- Railway Seminar series (production contracted by Taito)
- Yamanote Line Naming 100th Anniversary Densha de GO! Special Edition ~Resurrection! Showa Era Yamanote Line~ (production contracted by Square Enix)

=== Peripherals ===
- USB serial conversion cable (cable for connecting Master Controller II for Train Simulator to PlayStation 2)

==== Music CD ====
- Keihan Railway Departure Melody Collection (contains the departure melodies of the Keihan Railway that Mukaiya created in 2007)
- Umisachi/Yamasachi BGM Collection (includes Kyushu Shinkansen BGM collection as an appendix) (contains the music horn and in-car BGM of the JR Kyushu Nichinan Tourist Limited Express Umisachi Yamasachi that Mukaiya created in 2009, as well as the departure melody and in-car chime of the Kyushu Shinkansen)
- Sakura – Kyushu Shinkansen Full Line Opening Commemorative BGM (contains the in-car chime and departure melody of the Kyushu Shinkansen that Mukaiya created in 2011)
- Unofficial Departure Melody Tokyu Line Edition (contains the Railway Festival in SHIBUYA held at Tokyu Department Store in 2011) 2011" by Takahito Sakurai. Not used at stations.)
- Miracle of Mukaiya Club (contains music from Mukaiya's new musical endeavor, "Mukaiya Club")
- Let's Go on the A-Train (contains the in-car BGM and chime for JR Kyushu's Amakusa Misumi Line tourist express train, "Let's Go on the A-Train", which Mukaiya produced in 2012. The iPad playback device was developed and delivered by the company.)
- Niconico Live Recording 2013 (a CD made with the entire production process made visible through Mukaiya's Niconico Live Broadcast. This is the company's first nationwide distribution.)
- Keihan Railway Departure Melody COLLECTION 2013 (A compilation of the departure melodies of the Keihan Electric Railway released in 2007, with the addition of new songs and unreleased tracks)
- Tokyo Metro Tozai Line Departure Melody Collection (Compiled the departure melodies of the Tokyo Metro Tozai Line to be introduced in May 2015, and their arranged versions)

=== Commercial simulator ===
- Tokyu Driving School Tokyu 5000 Series Train (2nd generation) Simulator
- Railway Museum (Saitama City) Railway Museum JNR Class D51 steam locomotive simulator (Kamaishi Line Hanamaki → Iwate Kamigo)
- Tokyu Toyoko Line 80th Anniversary Opening Railway Festival Toyoko Line/Minatomirai Line Simulator

May 2 to 7, 2008, at Tokyu Department Store Toyoko Branch for a limited time. The 5050 series, 9000 series, and Y500 series could operate on four sections: limited express Jiyugaoka → Shibuya, express Jiyugaoka → Nakameguro, local Kikuna → Motosumiyoshi, and limited express Yokohama → Motomachi-Chukagai.

- Train and Bus Museum 8090 Series Train Simulator (Denentoshi Line Chuo-Rinkan→Futako Tamagawa)
- Kids City Japan Kidzania Koshien Hanshin 1000 Series Train Simulator (Train Pavilion)
- Railway Museum 209 Series Simulator (Keihin Tohoku Line Omiya→Tabata), 211 Series Simulator (Takasaki Line Omiya → Kagohara)

In the passenger compartment where visitors wait their turn, the 211 series has a modified nameplate with Ongakukan's logo attached under the nameplate of the manufacturer that produced the car body, and the 209 series has the company's logo added to the car number sticker, following the example of the real car.

- Tobu Museum 8000 Series, 10030 Series Train, 50050 Series Train Simulator (Isesaki Line [Express, Limited Express] Kita-Senju→Tobu Dobutsu Koen, Isesaki Line [Local] Kasukabe→Asakusa, Tojo Main Line [Express] Ikebukuro→Shinrin-koen, Tojo Main Line [Commuter Express] Kawagoeshi→Ikebukuro)
- Railway Museum Group-training train driving simulator for driver experience classes

Based on the E233 series, you can experience driving in three courses: "Beginner" to learn basic driving, "Intermediate" to learn signals and speed limits, and "Advanced" to learn punctual driving and comfortable driving. The model line is Takasaki Line, Omiya → Kagohara.

- Kyushu Railway Memorial Museum JR Kyushu 811 series driving simulator (Kagoshima Main Line Mojiko → Orio)

The video generator and content have been improved. There are three modes: "Beginner", which guides the user through driving with voice and display, "Normal", which guides the user only with display, and "Professional", which has no guide at all and requires the user to check and operate the ATS.

- Kyushu Railway Company ATS-DK Training Simulator

Responsible for the simulator used for training crew members that mimics the operation of Kyushu Railway Company's signaling and safety device, the ATS-DK.

- Toyoko Line Simulator for Railway Festival 2012 in Shibuya

Limited release at Tokyu Department Store, Toyoko Branch from May 3, 2012, to May 8. A CG simulator created based on drawings and interviews for the Toyoko Line's Daikanyama-Shibuya section, which was undergoing underground construction at the time in preparation for mutual through operation with the Tokyo Metro Fukutoshin Line.

- Kuzuha Mall SANZEN-HIROBA

Located in the south wing of Kuzuha Mall, "Hikari no Mall", SANZEN-HIROBA has installed a "digital dynamic preservation" of the old Keihan 3000 series (car number 3505), an 8000 series simulator, and a 2600 series simulator. Digital dynamic preservation is a realistic exhibition method that uses video and audio to make the train appear as if it is moving, even though the train itself does not move (static preservation). Users can experience driving the digital dynamic preservation of car number 3505 by registering in advance via the Internet.

- Misaki Park Wakuwaku Train Land

A space-saving simulator that displays instruments in CG on the front screen. It is a replica of the Nankai Electric Railway 1000 series, and the master controller handle and brake handle have been developed for children.

- E5 series Shinkansen simulator for East Japan Railway Company

First unveiled at InnoTrans 2014. Some of the actual equipment is used in the driver's cab, reproducing the operation of the Shinkansen's signal safety system DS-ATC and various other equipment. It is also possible to experience abnormal situations such as earthquakes and emergency calls, and it supports both Japanese and English. The mock-up car body can be separated, making it a portable simulator.
