= Hashimoto Station =

Hashimoto Station may refer to:

- Hashimoto Station (Kanagawa), a station in Kanagawa Prefecture, Japan
- Hashimoto Station (Kyoto), a station in Kyoto Prefecture, Japan
- Hashimoto Station (Wakayama), a station in Wakayama Prefecture, Japan
- Hashimoto Station (Fukuoka), a station in Fukuoka Prefecture, Japan
