= Train simulator (disambiguation) =

A train simulator is a computer-based simulation of rail transport operations.

Train Simulator may also refer to:

- Train Simulator (Ongakukan), a Japanese video game series started in 1995
- Microsoft Train Simulator, a 2001 video game
- Train Simulator Classic, a 2009 video game, originally titled Train Simulator
