= Makino Station (Osaka) =

Railway station in Hirakata, Osaka Prefecture, Japan

Makino Station 牧野駅
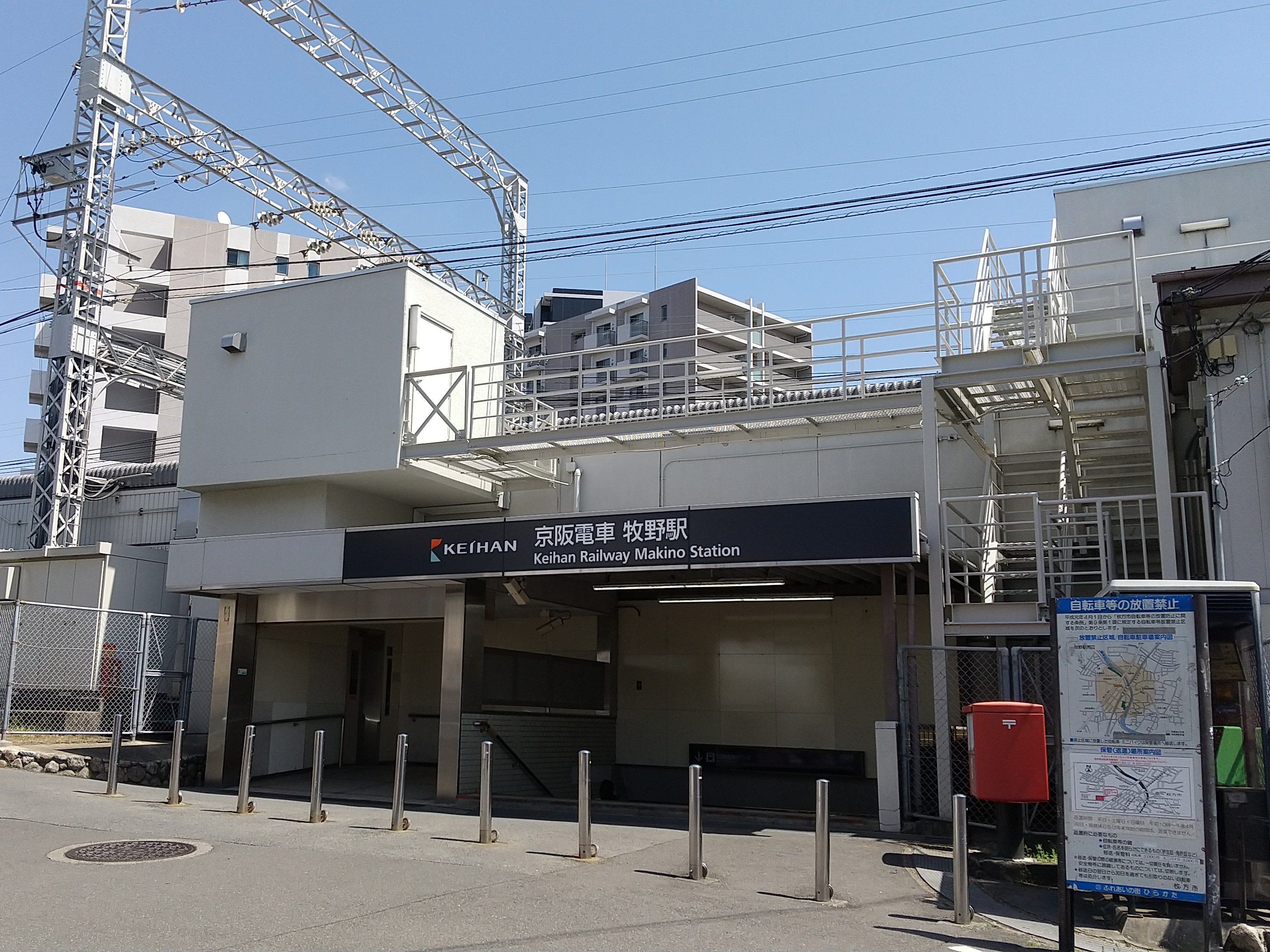
- Makino Station west gate, April 2023

General information
- Location: 2-4 Makinosaka, Hirakata-shi, Osaka-fu 573-1146; Japan
- Coordinates: 34.8437°N 135.6658°E
- Operator: Keihan Electric Railway
- Line: ■ Keihan Main Line
- Distance: 25.5 km from Yodoyabashi
- Platforms: 2 side platforms
- Connections: Bus terminal

Other information
- Status: Staffed
- Station code: KH23
- Website: Official website

History
- Opened: 15 April 1910; 116 years ago

Passengers
- FY2019: 23,327 daily
Location
- Location within Osaka Prefecture Location within Japan

Makino Station (牧野駅, Makino-eki) is a passenger railway station in located in the city of Hirakata, Osaka Prefecture, Japan, operated by the private railway company Keihan Electric Railway.

== Lines ==
Makino Station is served by the Keihan Main Line, and is located 25.5 km from the starting point of the line at Yodoyabashi Station.

== Station layout ==
The station has two elevated island platforms with the station building underneath.

=== Platforms ===
12	■ Keihan Main Line	for Chushojima, Sanjo and Demachiyanagi
2	■ Keihan Main Line	for Hirakatashi, Kyobashi, Yodoyabashi and Nakanoshima

== Adjacent stations ==
«	Service	»
Keihan Railway Keihan Main Line
Rapid Limited Express "RAKURAKU" (快速特急 洛楽): Does not stop at this station
Limited Express (特急): Does not stop at this station
Liner (ライナー): Does not stop at this station
Commuter Rapid Express for Nakanoshima (通勤快急): Does not stop at this station
Rapid Express (快速急行): Does not stop at this station
Midnight Express for Kuzuha (深夜急行): Does not stop at this station
Express (急行): Does not stop at this station
Gotenyama	Commuter Sub Express for Yodoyabashi or Nakanoshima (通勤準急)	Kuzuha
Gotenyama	Sub Express (準急)	Kuzuha
Gotenyama	Semi-Express (区間急行)	Kuzuha
Gotenyama	Local (普通)	Kuzuha

- Starting only: Semi-Express (区間急行)
- Terminating only: Midnight Express (深夜急行) (arriving at 0:50 a.m.)

== History ==
The station was opened on April 15, 1910.

== Passenger statistics ==
In fiscal 2019, the station was used by an average of 23,327 passengers daily.

== Surrounding area ==
- Osaka Dental University
- Makino Park
- Kansai Medical University

== See also ==
- List of railway stations in Japan
