= Yodo Station =

Railway station in Kyoto, Japan

Yodo Station 淀駅
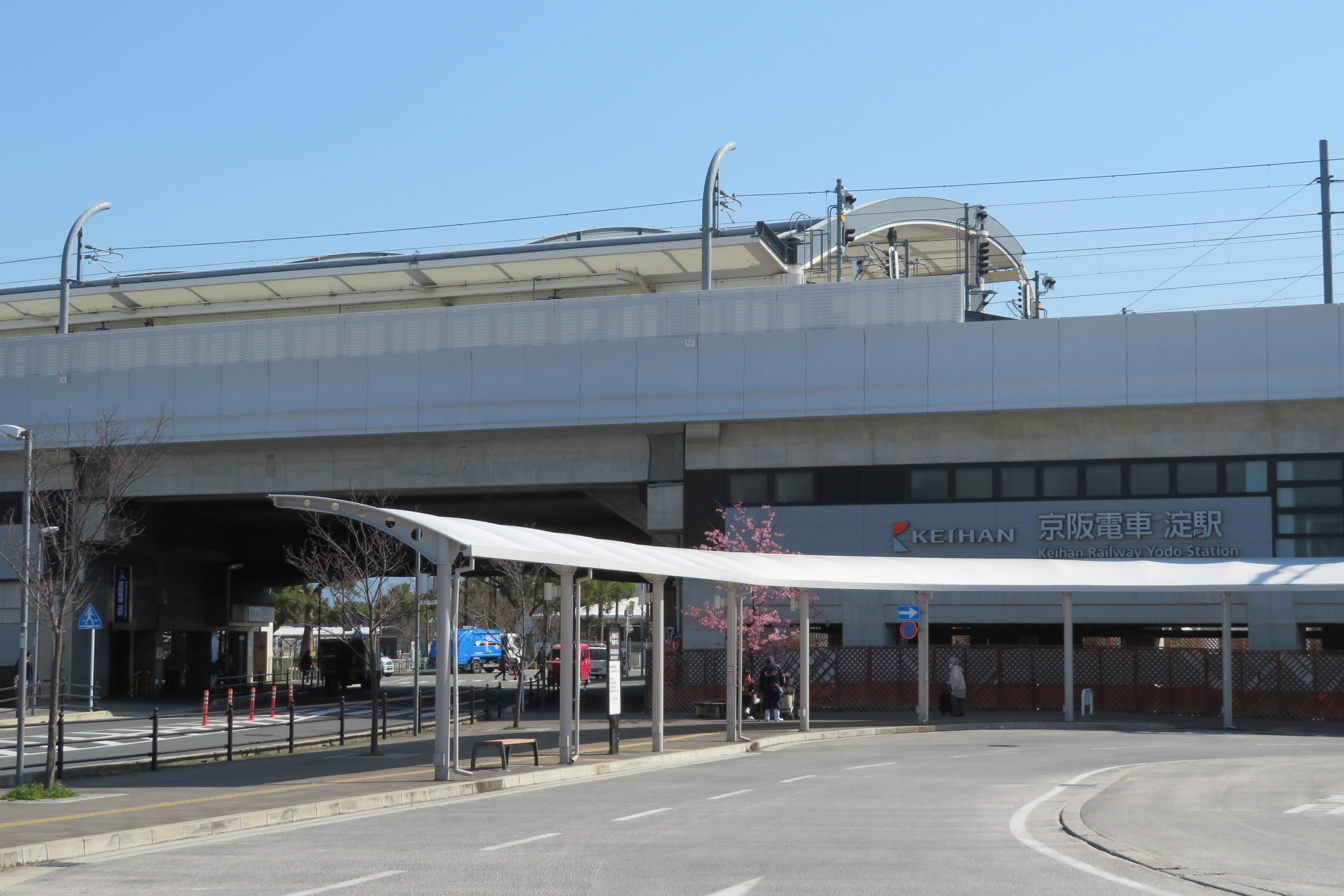
- Central entrance (February 24, 2020)

General information
- Location: Fushimi-ku, Kyoto; Kyoto Prefecture; Japan
- Coordinates: 34°54′24″N 135°43′17″E
- Operator: Keihan Electric Railway
- Line: Keihan Main Line
- Distance: 35.3 km from Yodoyabashi
- Platforms: 2
- Tracks: 4

Construction
- Structure type: Elevated

Other information
- Station code: KH27
- Website: Official (in Japanese)

History
- Opened: 1910; 116 years ago

Passengers
- FY2015: 4.8 million
Location
- Location within Kyoto city Location within Japan

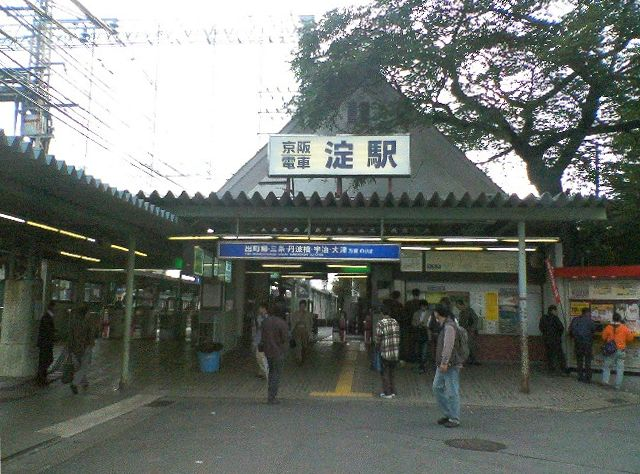
Former station building (October 23, 2005)

Yodo Station (淀駅, Yodo-eki) is a train station located in Fushimi-ku, Kyoto, Kyoto Prefecture, Japan.

== Line ==
- Keihan Electric Railway Keihan Main Line

== Layout ==
Before moving the westbound platform, there were a side platform and an island platform with 3 tracks. The westbound platform was elevated on September 12, 2009, with the eastbound platform following on May 28, 2011, to make it useful for passengers going to Kyoto Racecourse, and there became 2 island platforms serving 4 tracks on March 16, 2013.

| 1, 2 | ■ Keihan Main Line | for Chushojima, Sanjo and Demachiyanagi |
| 3, 4 | ■ Keihan Main Line | for Hirakatashi, Kyobashi, Yodoyabashi and Nakanoshima |

== Surroundings ==
The Kyoto Racecourse is located within a distance of short walk from Yodo Station.

== Adjacent stations ==
| « | Service | » |
Keihan Railway
Keihan Main Line
| Iwashimizu-hachimangū | Local | Chūshojima |
| Iwashimizu-hachimangū | Sub Express; Commuter Sub Express (in the morning on weekdays, only westbound for Yodoyabashi or Nakanoshima) | Chūshojima |
| Iwashimizu-hachimangū | Express (originating and terminating at Yodo) | Chūshojima |
| Iwashimizu-hachimangū | Extra Express for Osaka (on the days of horse racing at Kyoto Racecourse) | Terminus |
Express: Does not stop at this station
Rapid Express: Does not stop at this station
Commuter Rapid Express (in the morning on weekdays, only westbound for Nakanoshima): Does not stop at this station
Limited Express: Does not stop at this station
| Kuzuha | Extra Limited Express for Yodoyabashi (on the days of horse racing at Kyoto Racecourse) | Terminus |
