= Kansai Medical University =

- 関西医科大学
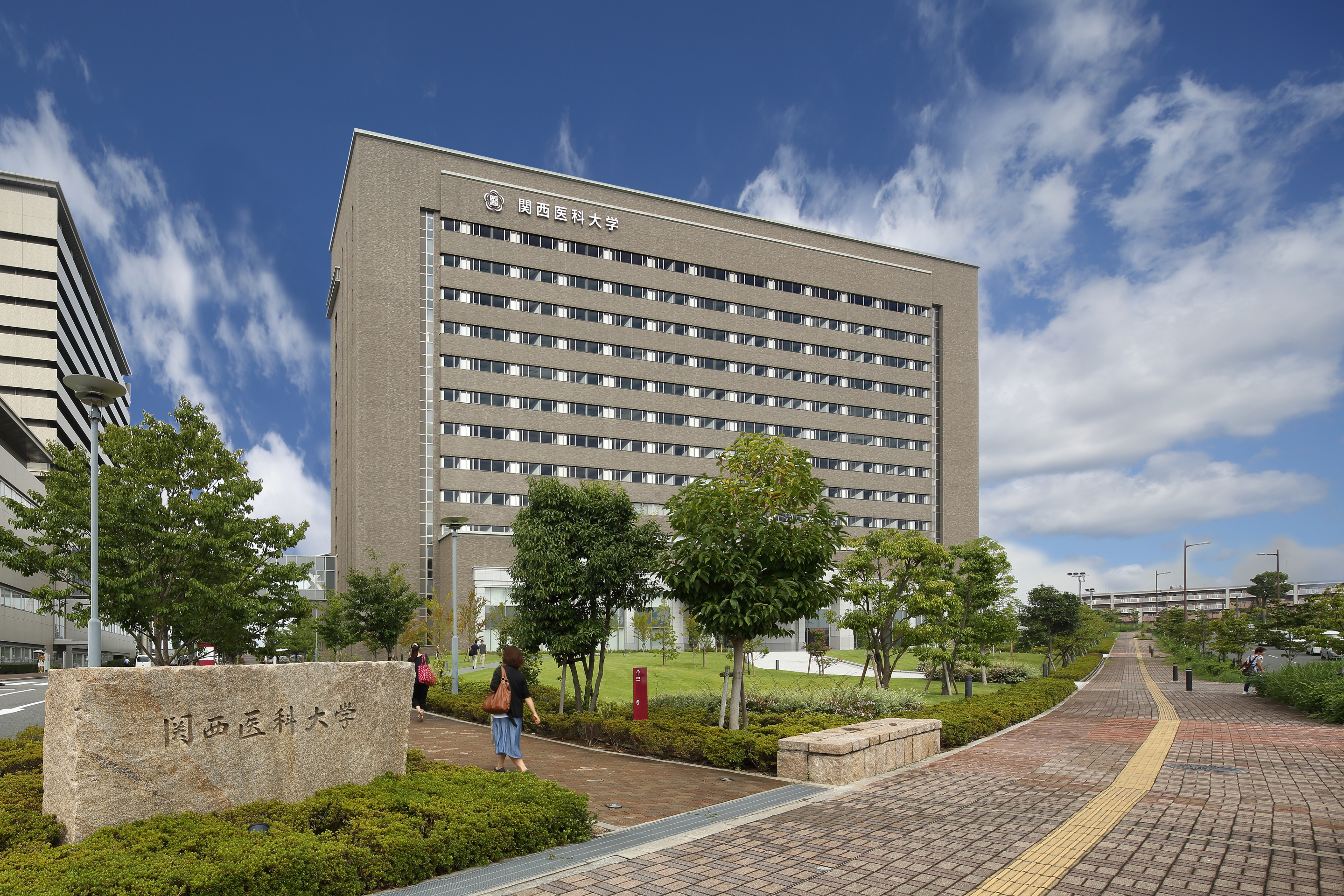
- Kansai Medical university, Hirakata Campus
- Former names: Osaka Women's Medical College; Osaka Women's Medical School
- Motto: 慈仁心鏡
- Motto in English: Benevolence, Compassion and Empathy
- Type: Private
- Established: 1928
- Chair: Toshio Yamashita
- President: Yuichi Tomoda
- Location: Hirakata, Osaka, Japan; 34°43′44″N 135°33′23″E
- Campus: Suburb
- Website: www.kmu.ac.jp

Kansai Medical University (関西医科大学, Kansai ika daigaku) is a private university in Hirakata, Osaka, Japan. The predecessor of the school was founded in 1928, and it was chartered as a women's medical college in 1947. In 1954 it became coeducational.

== Organization ==
This university has following organization.

=== Graduate Schools ===
- Graduate School of Medicine
- Graduate School of Nursing

=== Faculties and Departments ===
- Faculty of Medicine
- Faculty of Nursing
  - Department of Nursing
- Faculty of Rehabilitation
  - Department of Physical Therapy
  - Department of Occupational Therapy

=== Institutes and Centers ===
- Center for Medical Education
- Center for International Exchange
- Clinical Research Support Center
- Ethics Inspection Center
- Molecular Imaging Center of Diseases
- IPS/Stem Cell Research Support Center
- Clinical Training Center
- Institute of Biomedical Science

=== University Hospitals ===
- University Hospital
- University Medical Center
- Kori Hospital
- Kuzuha Hospital
- Temmabashi General Clinic

== Campuses ==
=== Hirakata Campus ===
Hirakata (枚方) Campus is the main campus located in Hirakata, close to Hirakatashi Station, which includes the Faculty of Medicine, the Faculty of Nursing, and the university hospital.

=== Makino Campus ===
Makino (牧野) Campus is the second campus for the Faculty of Rehabilitation, located in Makino, Hirakata, close to Makino Station.

== Controversies ==
In 2024 several NuVasive Japan sales representatives were photographed at the University’s Medical Center performing X-rays during spinal implant operations, acts that are illegal without accreditation. The company admitted 4 sales representatives operated X-ray machines across several hospitals in the Kanto and Kansai regions.

In 2026 photos emerged of NuVasive Japan sales representatives again at Kansai Medical University’s Medical Center holding up patients' legs in a surgical ward.
