= Densha de Go! (video game) =

1997 Video game

- Advertising flyer
- Developer: Taito
- Publisher: Taito
- Designer: Akira Saito
- Series: Densha de Go!
- Platforms: Arcade, PlayStation, Sega Saturn, WonderSwan, mobile phone
- Release: JP: March 1997
- Genre: Train simulation
- Mode: Single-player

Densha de Go! (Note: Japanese: 電車でGO!, Hepburn: lit. "Let's Go by Train!") is a 1997 train simulator arcade game developed and published by Taito in Japan. Players are tasked with guiding a train to its destination under a time limit while managing its acceleration and speed limitations. It features real-world train stations and train lines from Japan, including the Yamanote Line and Keihin–Tōhoku Line. The game was ported to the PC, Sega Saturn, and PlayStation.

The concept for Densha de Go! was inspired by designer Akira Saito's personal fascination with Japanese train lines and railroads. He wanted to create a game that allowed players to familiarize themselves with driving a train. The controls were his primary focus as he wanted them to be accurate and responsive, and to mimic the controls of a real train—his father worked for the Kyoto City Transportation Bureau Facilities Division, which made this easier to accomplish. Saito included real-world railroads and trains to appeal towards other railroad enthusiasts, thinking that it could also attract more "ordinary" players for its realistic, familiar theme. As arcades at the time were dominated primarily by racing and fighting games, he believed its unique concept could make it stand out.

Densha de Go! is among Taito's most successful games, preceded only by Space Invaders. The PlayStation version sold over one million copies. The game was well-received by critics for its controls, attention to detail, and unique concept. Some felt that its home releases lacked enough content and had poor visuals. It was followed by a long series of sequels, spin-offs, and reimaginings, beginning with Densha de Go! 2 in 1999.

== Gameplay ==
Arcade version screenshot

Densha de Go! is a train simulation video game. The player assumes the role of a train driver on one of four commuter train routes, who must guide a Japanese passenger train to its destination under a strict time limit. The player must drive their train carefully, obeying speed limits and signals as they drive according to the game's schedule, stopping at each station as close to the stop marker as possible. Each route has a set number of bonus seconds shown at the top of the screen. Positive actions such as stopping on point and on time and blowing the whistle for tunnels and bridges will add to the bonus seconds, while negative actions such as going over the speed limit and overshooting the platform will incur a penalty. For each second the train runs late, a bonus second (two in some routes) are taken from the player's bonus second pool. When all of the bonus seconds are exhausted, the game ends. If the train runs early instead, the upcoming signals may force the player to reduce their speed, increasing the chance the player will become late. Upon completion of a round, the player is prompted to enter a four-initial name into the high score board, with letters and limited Japanese characters selected using the brake handle.

== Development ==
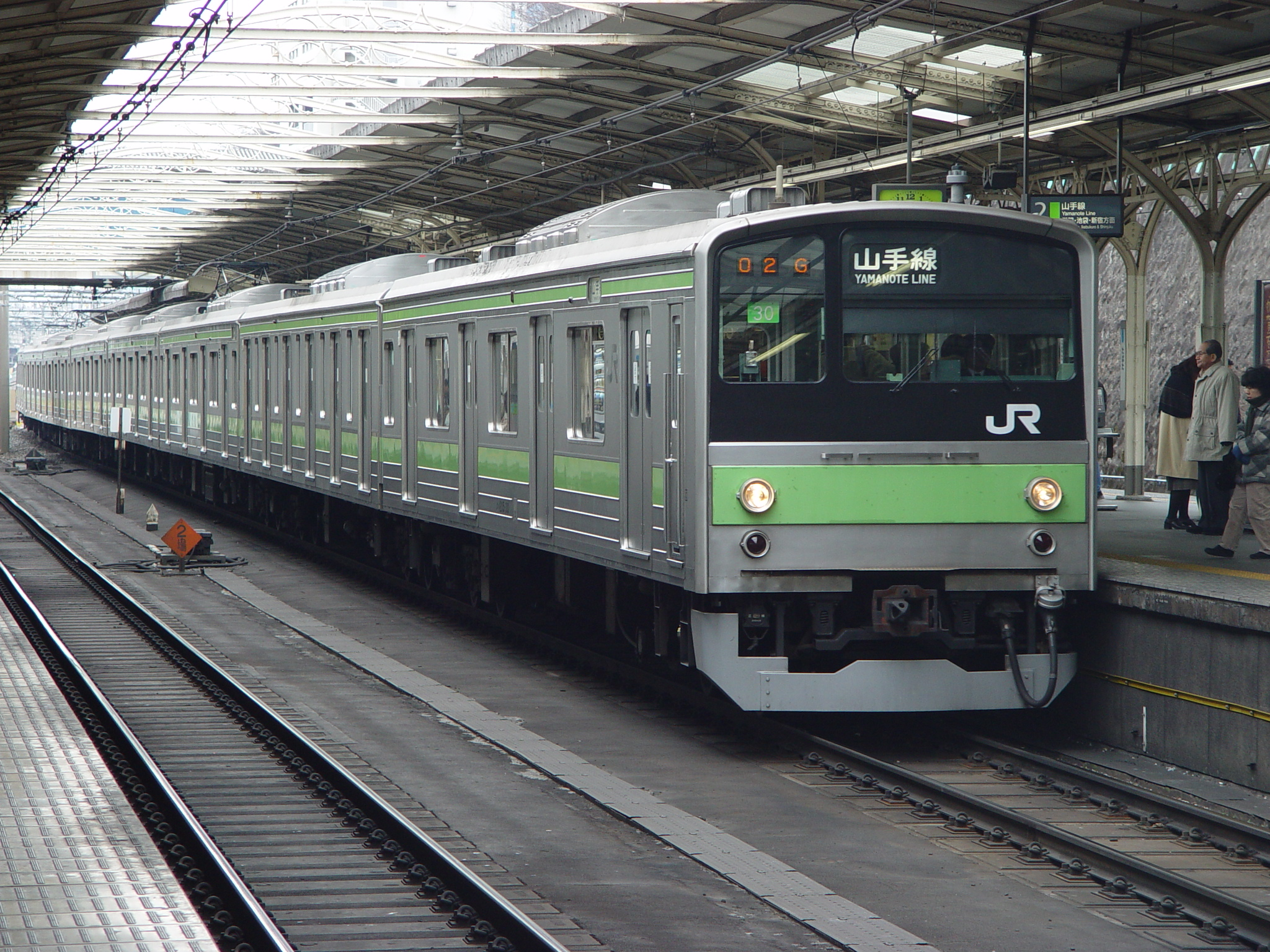
The usage of real-world train lines and locations in Densha de Go! was to attract rail enthusiasts in particular.

Densha de Go! was the creation of Taito video game designer Akira Saito. Based on his personal fascination with Japanese trains and railroads, Saito wanted to create a video game that allowed players to easily become familiar with driving a train. His primary focus was towards the game's controls as he wanted them to be responsive and as accurate to a real train as possible — his father worked for the Kyoto City Transportation Bureau Facilities Division, which made this task easier to fulfill. As a way to attract railroad enthusiasts to his game, Saito included many real-world train lines and stations such as the Yamanote Line, paying close attention to detail and the way they were represented. He often traveled to these stations himself to make any last-minute changes or corrections. Saito also felt that its realistic, familiar premise could attract newer, more "ordinary" players. Several of the locations and trains were taken from experiences in his childhood, which he claims to have been the "driving force" of development. Taito was skeptical of the idea at first, concerned that its realistic premise would cause it to become lost within the growing popularity of racing and fighting games. Saito felt differently, thinking that its unique concept would instead make it stand out from other games at the time.

== Release ==
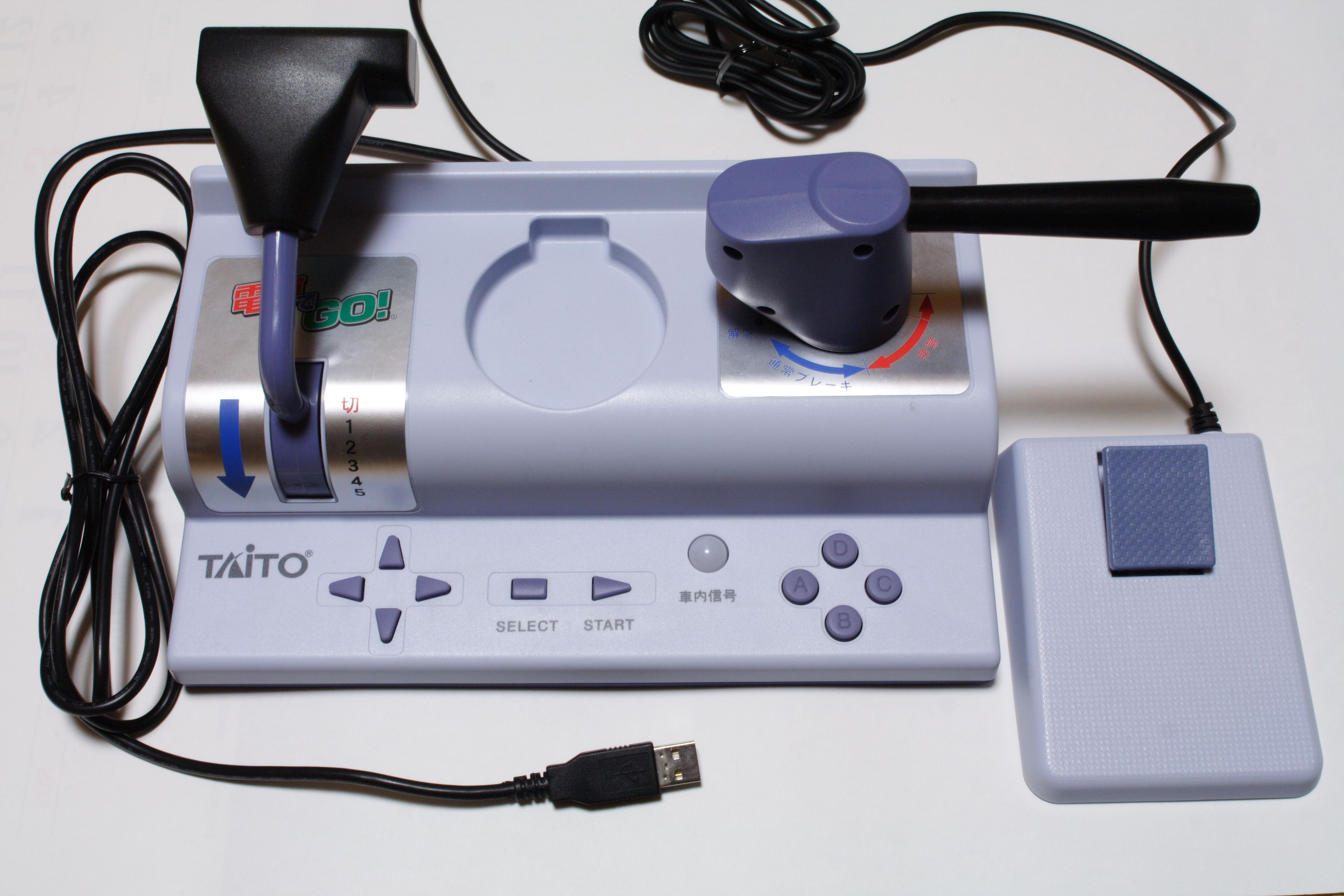
Home releases of Densha de Go! were bundled with a special controller that mimicked the control setup used in the arcade version.

Densha de Go! was demonstrated at the 1996 Amusement Machine Show (AMS) exposition in Tokyo, alongside G-Darius and Arkanoid Returns. It was released in Japan in March 1997. It was one of the expo's most popular games; Official Sega Saturn Magazine claims that it saw more player numbers than Sega's The House of the Dead. Taito chose not to release it overseas, as the company felt its heavy usage of region-specific train lines and stations made it unsuitable for non-Japanese players.

A PlayStation home version of Densha de Go! was released on December 18, 1997 in Japan, followed by a version for Microsoft Windows on April 23, 1999. For the home versions, Taito produced a special controller that mimicked the control setup used in arcades. The controller was released separately and has since become a prized collector's item. Ports for the Game Boy Color and WonderSwan were published in 2000.

== Reception ==
Reception

Review scores
Publication	Score
Famitsu	21/40 (WS)
Dengeki PlayStation	330/400 (PS)

Award
Publication	Award
Sony Computer Entertainment	Platinum Prize

The arcade version of Densha de Go! attracted considerable attention for its unique premise making it stand out among other games at the time, many of which were racing games or fighters. It was a hit in Japanese arcades. The PlayStation version of the game sold over one million copies, leading to Sony Computer Entertainment awarding Taito the Platinum Prize award at the 1998 PlayStation Awards ceremony. According to Taito representative Keiji Fujita, it is the company's second most-successful game after Space Invaders.

Home ports of Densha de Go! were well-received by critics for retaining the same feel and realism the arcade version had. Dengeki PlayStation said that its easy-to-learn controls and more realistic approach made Densha de Go! a welcome title for newcomers to the genre. Many applauded the game’s attention to detail and accuracy with its usage of real-world railroads and trains. Dengeki PlayStation was particularly impressed with the accuracy of the in-game world and environments, saying it would greatly appeal to railroad fans and players not even familiar with the genre as a whole. Famitsu had a similar response, finding many of its railroad tracks and stations to be accurately depicted.

Some publications were mixed on the game's graphics. Dengeki PlayStation wrote that the PlayStation conversion's graphics was not as good as the arcade version. The WonderSwan port was disliked by Famitsu for having poor graphics and clunky controls, saying it was a drastic downgrade in quality compared to other versions of the game.
