= Iwashimizu-hachimangū Station =

Railway station in Yawata, Kyoto Prefecture, Japan

Iwashimizu-hachimangū Station 石清水八幡宮駅
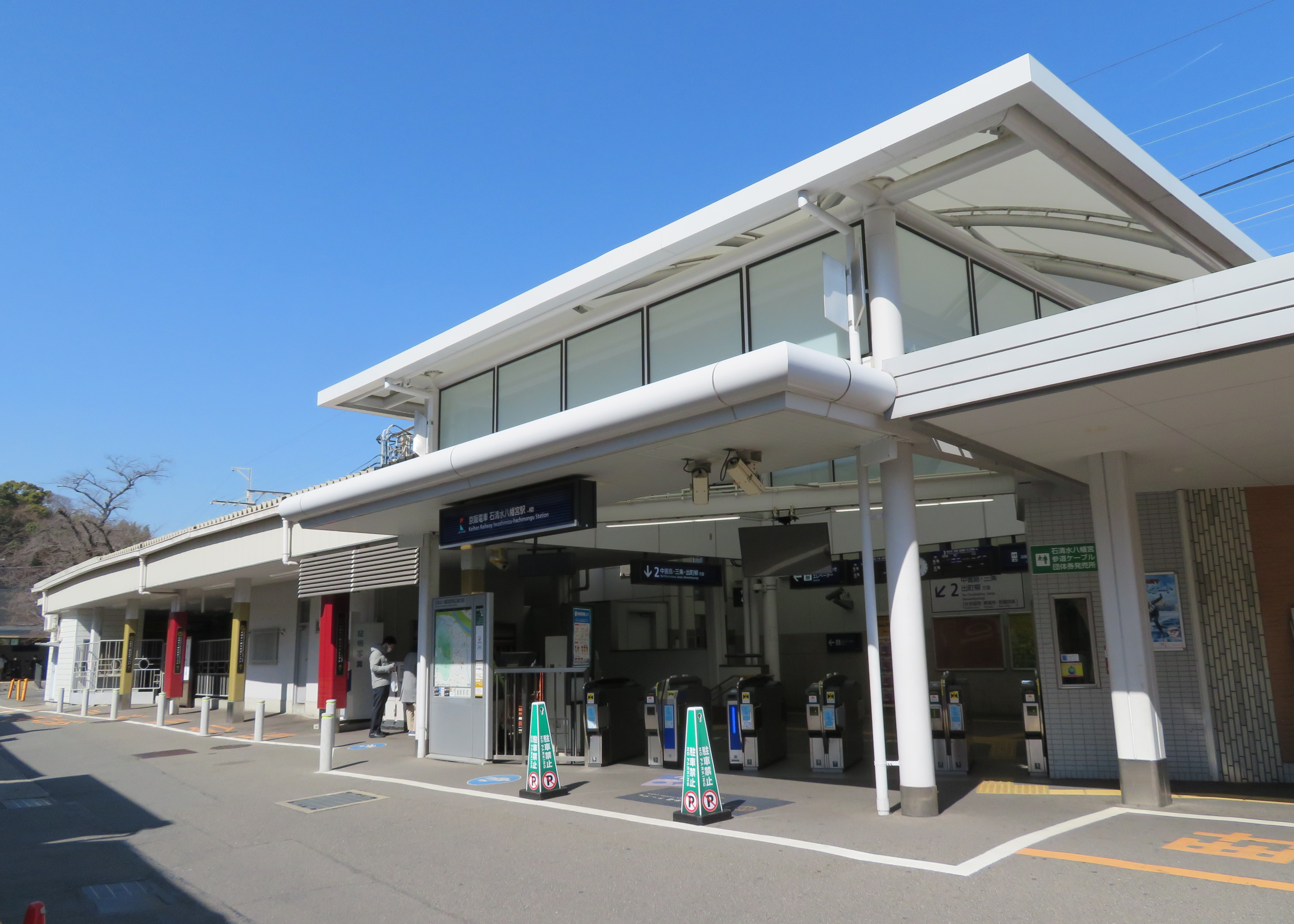
- Iwashimizu-hachimangū Station in February 2020

General information
- Location: Yawata-Takabo, Yawata-shi, Kyoto-fu 614-8001; Japan
- Coordinates: 34°53′4.03″N 135°42′0.75″E
- Operator: Keihan Electric Railway
- Lines: Keihan Main Line; Cable Line
- Distance: 31.8 km from Yodoyabashi
- Platforms: 2 side platforms; 1 bay platform
- Connections: Bus terminal

Other information
- Station code: KH26
- Website: Official website

History
- Opened: 15 April 1910; 116 years ago
- Former names: Keihan Line: Yawata (to 1939); Iwashimizu-Hachimangū-mae (to 1948); Yawatachō (to 1977); Yawatashi (to 2019); Iwashimizu-Hachimangū Cable: Yawataguchi Station; Yawatachō (until 1977)

Passengers
- FY2019: 9,036

Services
Preceding station	Keihan Electric Railway	Following station
Hashimoto towards Yodoyabashi	Keihan Main Line Local Sub Express	Yodo towards Sanjō
Hashimoto towards Yodoyabashi	Keihan Main Line Commuter Sub Express	Yodo One-way operation
Kuzuha towards Yodoyabashi	Keihan Main Line Express	Chūshojima towards Sanjō
Kuzuha towards Yodoyabashi	Keihan Main Line Express	Yodo Terminus
Terminus	Cable Line	Cable-hachimangū-sanjō Terminus
Location
- Location within Kyoto Prefecture Location within Japan

Iwashimizu-hachimangū Station (石清水八幡宮駅, Iwashimizuhachimangu-eki) is a passenger railway station located in the city of Yawata, Kyoto Prefecture, Japan, operated by the private transportation company, Keihan Electric Railway.

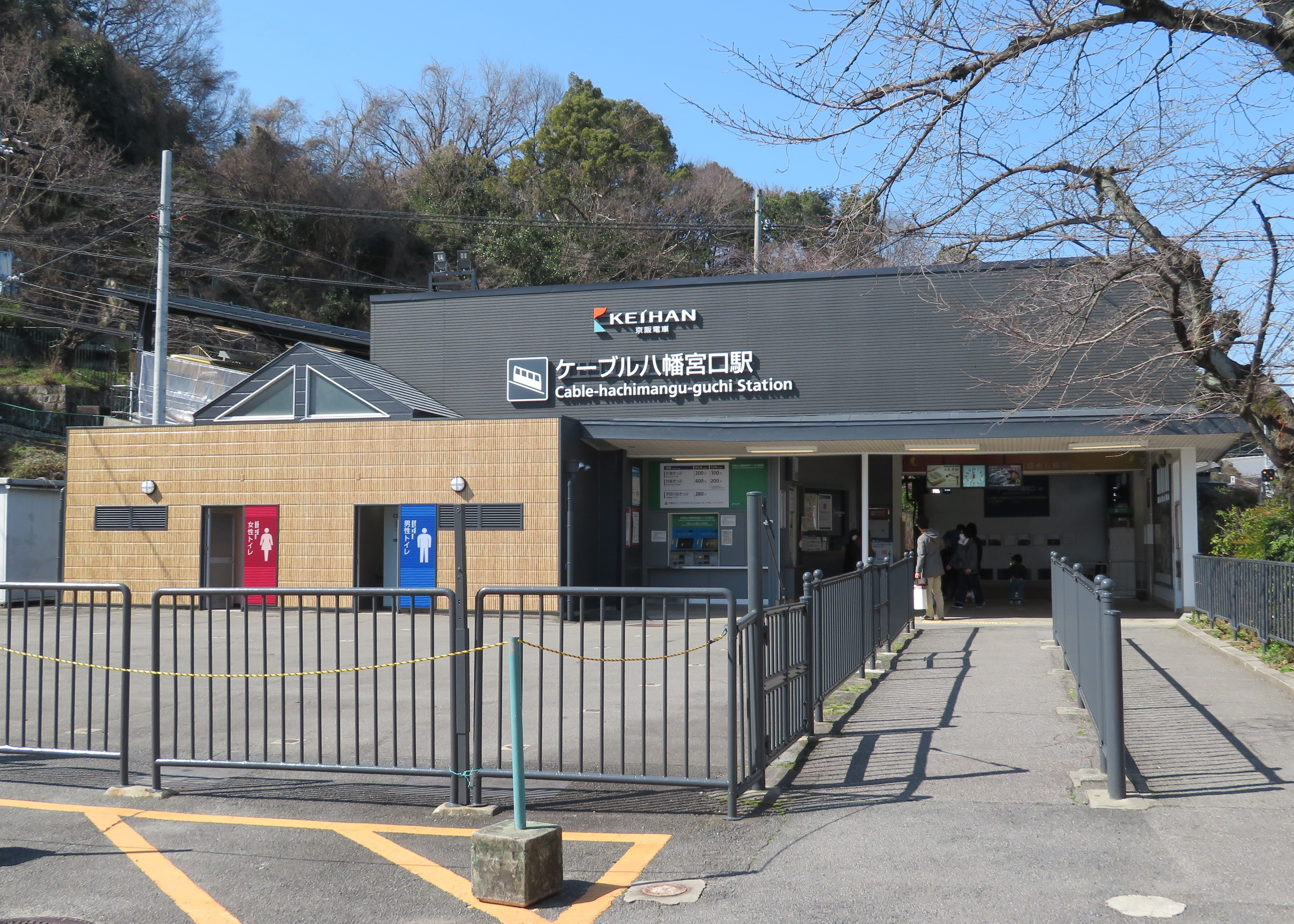
Cable-hachimangū-guchi Station in February 2020

== Lines ==
Iwashimizu-hachimangū Station is served by the Keihan Main Line and is located 31.8 rail kilometers from the terminus of the line at Yodoyabashi Station. The station is also the terminus of the Iwashimizu-Hachimangū Cable.

== Station layout ==
The station consists of two opposed side platforms, with the station building underneath. As originally built, the station had two island platforms, but when the tracks were elevated, the outer platforms were discontinued, but the original platform number was retained. The station on the Cable Line is officially known as Cable-hachimangū-guchi (ケーブル八幡宮口駅, Kēburu-hachimangū-guchi-eki). It has 2 dead-end platforms on the sides of a track; one platform is usually used for getting on and off while the other is used for getting off only during crowded seasons.

=== Platforms ===
1	■ Keihan Main Line	For Sanjō, and Demachiyanagi
2	■ Keihan Main Line	For Yodoyabashi

== History ==
Iwashimizu-hachimangū Station opened on 15 April 1910 at the same time as the opening of the Keihan Main Line as Yawata Station (八幡駅, Yawata-eki). It was renamed Iwashimizu Hachiman-gu Mae Station (石清水八幡宮前駅) on 25 December 1939, Yawatacho Station (八幡町駅) on 1 January 1948, and Yawatashi Station (八幡市駅) on 1 November 1977. The name was changed again in October 2019 to reflect the station's proximity to the Iwashimizu Hachimangū Shinto shrine.

== Passenger statistics ==
In fiscal 2019, the station was used by an average of 9,036 passengers daily.

== Surrounding area ==
- Iwashimizu Hachiman-gū
- Yawata City Shokado Museum of Art
- Yawata City Hall

== See also ==
- List of railway stations in Japan
