= Shōko Kawata =

Japanese politician (born 1990)

- 川田 翔子

Mayor of Yawata
- Incumbent
- Assumed office 13 November 2023
- Preceded by: Fumiaki Horiguchi

Personal details
- Born: 30 August 1990 (age 36) Nara City, Nara Prefecture, Japan
- Party: Independent
- Education: Kyoto University

Shōko Kawata (川田 翔子, Kawata Shōko; born 30 August 1990) is a Japanese politician who has served as the mayor of Yawata, Kyoto Prefecture since 2023.

== Life and career ==
Kawata was born on 30 August 1990 in Nara City, Nara Prefecture. After graduating from Osaka Toin Junior and Senior High School and Kyoto University's Faculty of Economics, she began working for Kyoto City Hall in 2015. After working as a caseworker for welfare recipients, she resigned in 2022. She began serving as a private secretary to Councillor Akiko Santo from February of that year until the end of August 2023.

On 8 September 2023, she announced her candidacy for that year's Yawata mayoral election, which occurred following the resignation of incumbent mayor Fumiaki Horiguchi. Kawata was endorsed by the Liberal Democratic Party, the Constitutional Democratic Party, and Komeito. Kawata campaigned on expanding childcare, cooperation with the national and prefectural governments, and growing the local economy. In the election held on 12 November, Kawata defeated opponents Ken Ogata and Yuko Kameda by approximately 2,000 votes to win her first term. Kawata is the youngest female mayor in Japan's history.

In 2025, she announced that she was married. In May 2026, Kawata revealed that she was pregnant with her first child and was due to give birth in September, and announced that she would be taking maternity leave. Kawata is the first female mayor in Japanese history to take maternity leave. She received polarized comments domestically regarding her maternity leave, garnering headlines in foreign media. She was interviewed by many foreign media outlets in the two months following her announcement of taking maternity leave, including CNN, The New York Times, and BBC News.
