= Cable-hachimangū-sanjō Station =

Funicular station in Yawata, Kyoto Prefecture, Japan

Cable-hachimangū-sanjō Station ケーブル八幡宮山上駅
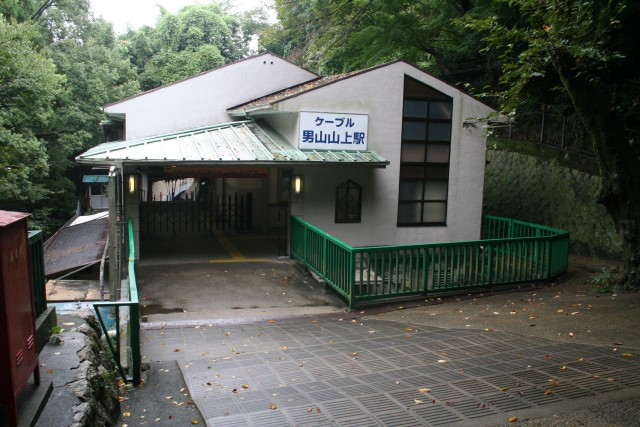
- Station exterior

General information
- Location: 85-1 Yawata-Hiranoyama, Yawata, Kyoto （京都府八幡市八幡平ノ山85-1） Japan
- Coordinates: 34°52′51.51″N 135°41′59.36″E
- Operator: Keihan Electric Railway
- Line: Iwashimizu-Hachimangu Cable

History
- Opened: 1955
- Former names: Hachimangū Station (until 1956); Otokoyama-sanjō (until 2019)
Location

Cable-hachimangū-sanjō Station (ケーブル八幡宮山上駅, Kēburu-hachimangū-sanjō-eki) is a funicular station located in Yawata, Kyoto Prefecture, Japan, on the Keihan Electric Railway Cable Line (Iwashimizu-Hachimangū Cable).

Prior to October 2019, the station was referred to as Otokoyama-sanjō Station (男山山上駅, Otokoyama-sanjō-eki).

== Layout ==
The station has 2 dead end platforms on the sides of a track, one platform is usually used for getting on and off while the other is used for getting off only during crowded seasons. There is no ticket machine or ticket gates, so that passengers must pay the fare for the Cable Car after getting off at Cable-hachimangū-guchi Station.

== Adjacent stations ==
«	Service	»
Keihan Railway Cable Line (Iwashimizu-Hachimangū Cable)
Cable-hachimangū-guchi	-	Terminus
