= Kuzuha Station =

Railway station in Hirakata, Osaka Prefecture, Japan

Kuzuha Station 樟葉駅
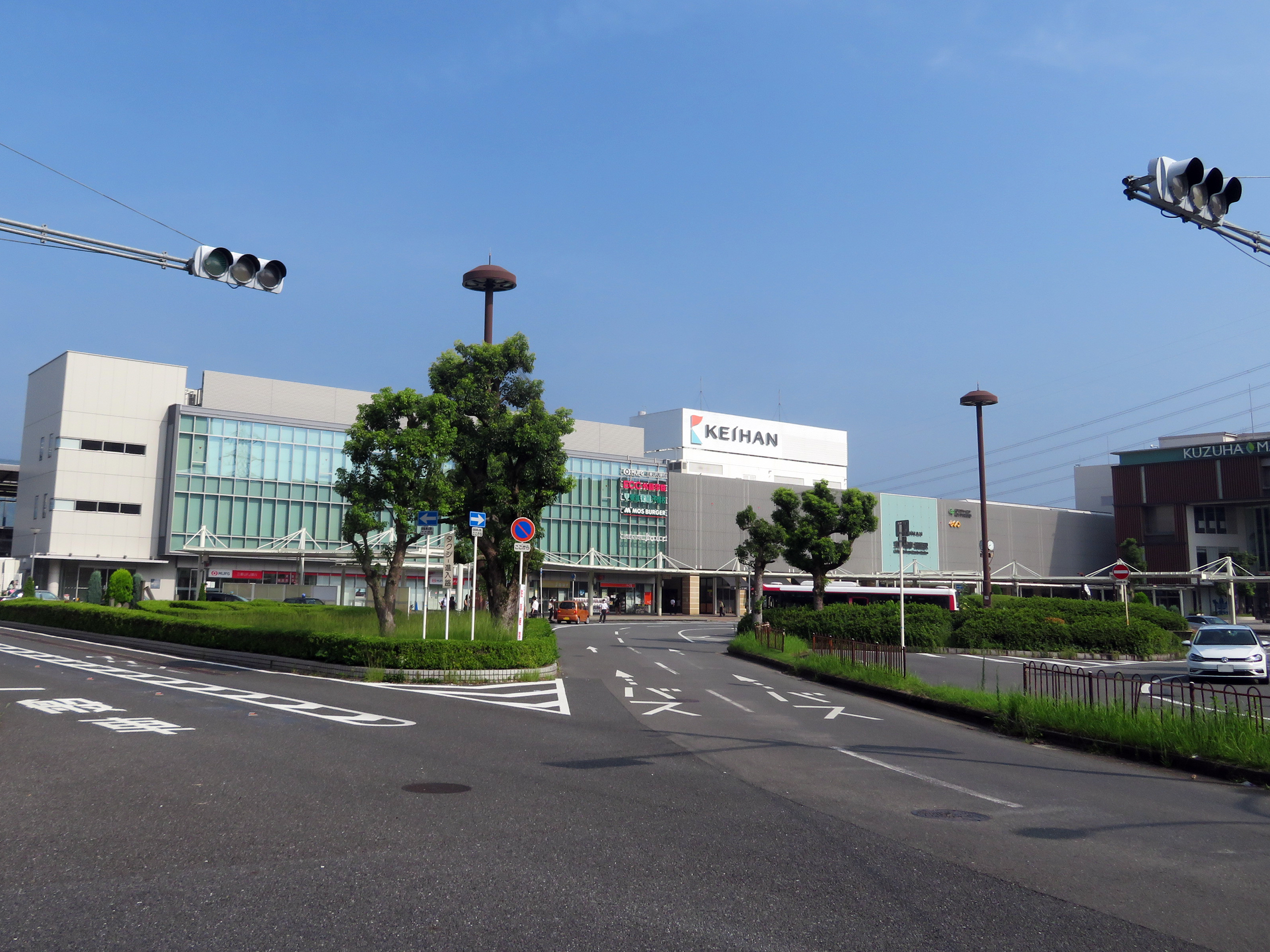
- Kuzuha Station, August 2020

General information
- Location: Kuzuha-Hanazonocho, Hirakata-shi, Osaka-fu 573-1121; Japan
- Coordinates: 34°51′43.16″N 135°40′30.98″E
- Operator: Keihan Electric Railway
- Line: ■ Keihan Main Line
- Distance: 27.7 km from Yodoyabashi
- Platforms: 2 island platforms
- Connections: Bus terminal

Other information
- Status: Staffed
- Station code: KH24
- Website: Official website

History
- Opened: 15 April 1910; 116 years ago

Passengers
- FY2019: 60,402 daily
Location
- Location within Osaka Prefecture Location within Japan

Kuzuha Station (樟葉駅, Kuzuha-eki) is a passenger railway station in located in the city of Hirakata, Osaka Prefecture, Japan, operated by the private railway company Keihan Electric Railway.

== Lines ==
Kuzuha Station is served by the Keihan Main Line, and is located 27.7 km from the starting point of the line at Yodoyabashi Station.

== Station layout ==
The station has two elevated island platforms with the station building underneath.

=== Platforms ===
1, 2	■ Keihan Main Line	for Chushojima, Sanjo and Demachiyanagi
3, 4	■ Keihan Main Line	for Hirakatashi, Kyobashi, Yodoyabashi and Nakanoshima

== Adjacent stations ==
«	Service	»
Keihan Railway Keihan Main Line
Makino	Local	Hashimoto
Makino	Semi-Express (starting)	Terminus
Makino	Sub Express	Hashimoto
Makino	Commuter Sub Express (in the morning on weekdays, only westbound for Yodoyabashi or Nakanoshima)	Hashimoto
Hirakatashi	Express	Iwashimizu-hachimangū
Hirakatashi	Midnight Express (terminating)	Terminus
Hirakatashi	Rapid Express	Chūshojima
Hirakatashi	Commuter Rapid Express (in the morning on weekdays, only westbound for Nakanoshima)	Chūshojima
Hirakatashi	Liner	Chūshojima
Hirakatashi	Limited Express	Chūshojima
Rapid Limited Express"RAKURAKU": Does not stop at this station

- Starting only: Semi-Express (区間急行)
- Terminating only: Midnight Express (深夜急行) (arriving at 0:50 a.m.)

== History ==
- April 15, 1910 - Station opens as the Keihan Main Line begins operation.
- June 20, 1971 - Station moves about 300 meters towards Osaka to the present location. Promoted to an express stop.
- April 1, 1972 - Keihan opens Kuzuha Mall shopping center in front of the station.
- September 6, 2003 - Promoted to a limited express stop.

== Passenger statistics ==
In fiscal 2019, the station was used by an average of 60,402 passengers daily.

== Surrounding area ==
- KUZUHA MALL
- Osaka Dental University Kuzuha Campus
- Keihan Bus terminal

== See also ==
- List of railway stations in Japan
