= Keihan Cable Line =

Funicular line in Yawata, Kyoto, Japan

Coordinates: 34°52′57.3″N 135°41′58.2″E

Keihan Cable Line funicular

The Iwashimizu-Hachimangū Cable (石清水八幡宮参道ケーブル, Iwashimizu hachmangū sandō kēburu), officially the Keihan Cable Line (京阪鋼索線, Keihan Kōsaku-sen), is a funicular line in Yawata, Kyoto, Japan, operated by Keihan Electric Railway. The line opened in 1926 as a route to Iwashimizu Shrine. Riders in January, the season of hatsumōde (New Year's Day visit to shrine), account for 50% of the whole year ridership.

Prior to October 2019, it was known as the Otokoyama Cable (男山ケーブル, Otokoyama Kēburu).

== Basic data ==
- Distance: 0.4 km or 0.2 mi
- System: Single track with two cars
- Gauge: 1,067 mm (3 ft 6 in)
- Stations: 2
- Vertical interval: 82 m or 269 ft

== Stations ==
No.	Station.	Japanese	Distance (km)	Transfers	Location	
KH80	Cable-hachimangū-guchi	ケーブル八幡宮口	0.0	(Iwashimizu-hachimangū) (KH26)	Yawata	Kyoto Prefecture
KH81	Cable-hachimangū-sanjō	ケーブル八幡宮山上	0.4		Yawata	Kyoto Prefecture

== See also ==
- List of funicular railways
- List of railway lines in Japan
