= Yawata =

Yawata 八幡市
- City
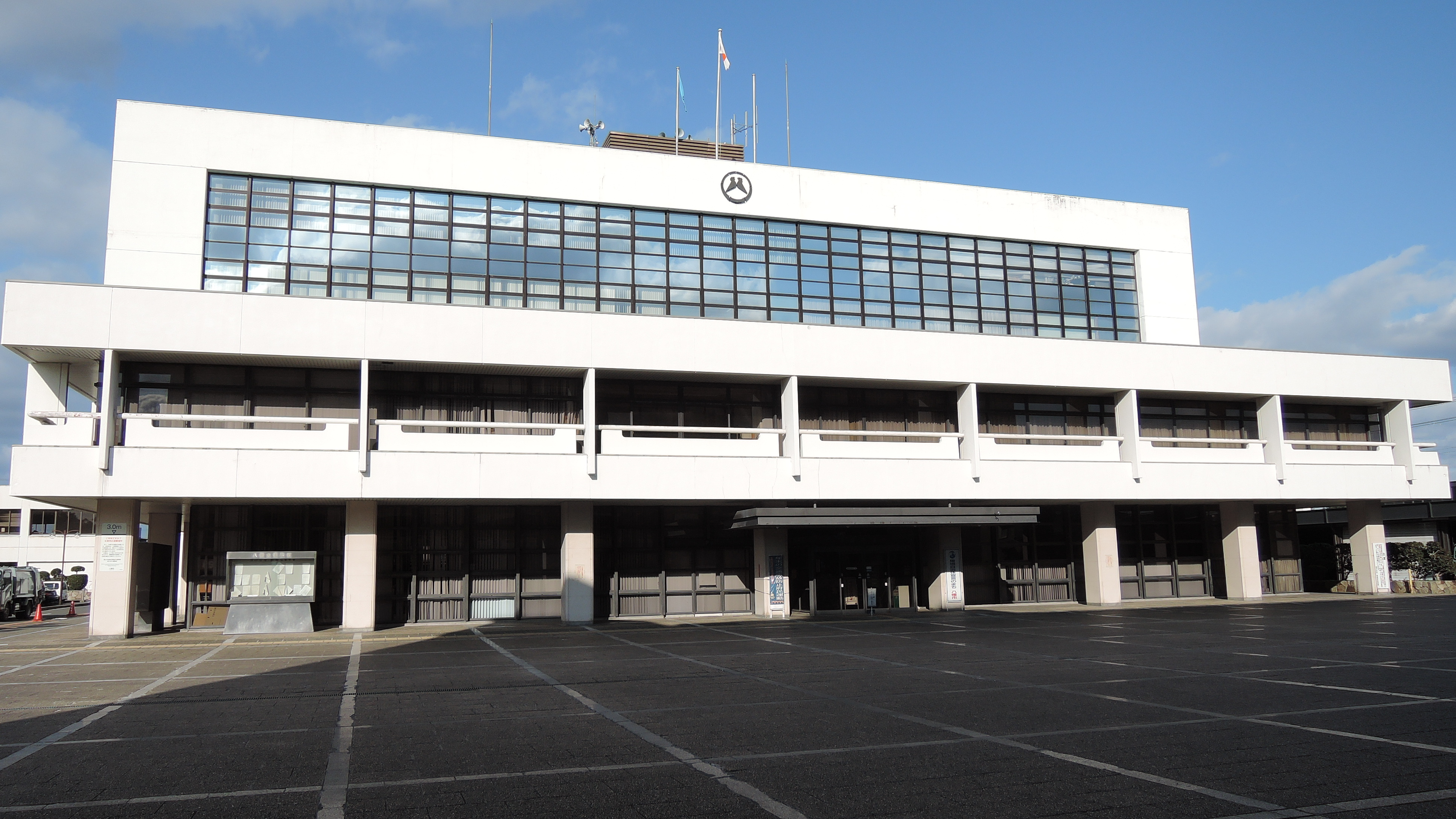
- Yawata City Hall

- Flag Emblem
- Location of Yawata in Kyoto Prefecture

- Location in Japan
- Coordinates: 34°52′32″N 135°42′27″E
- Country: Japan
- Region: Kansai
- Prefecture: Kyoto

Government
  - Mayor: Shōko Kawata (since November 2023)

Area
  - Total: 24.35 km^{2} (9.40 sq mi)

Population (July 31, 2023)
  - Total: 69,306
  - Density: 2,846/km^{2} (7,372/sq mi)
- Time zone: UTC+09:00 (JST)
- City hall address: Yawata-Sonouchi 75, Yawata-shi, Kyoto-fu 614-8501
- Website: Official website
- Symbols
- Bird: Parus minor
- Flower: Rhododendron
- Tree: Cinnamomum camphora

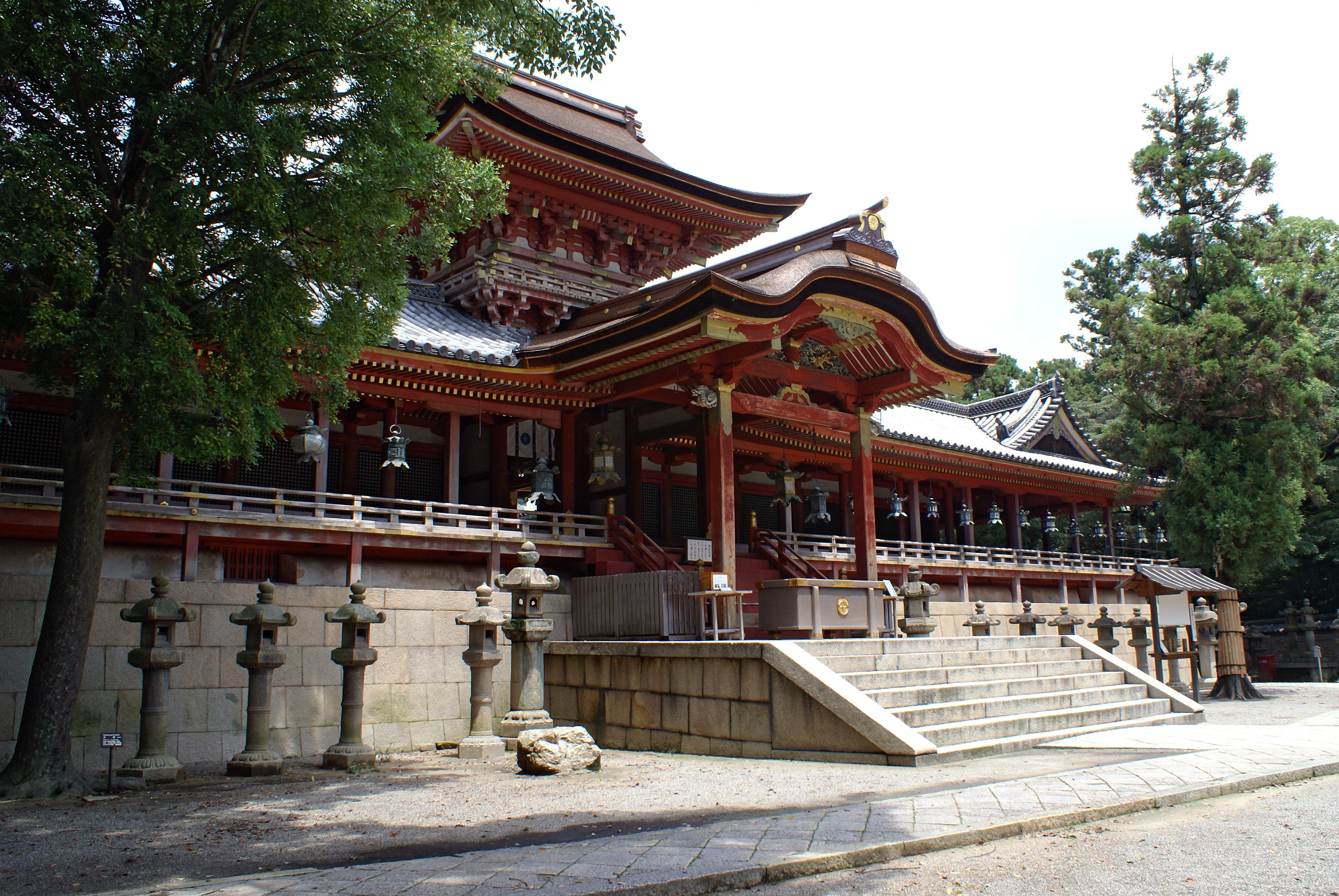
Iwashimizu Hachiman-gū

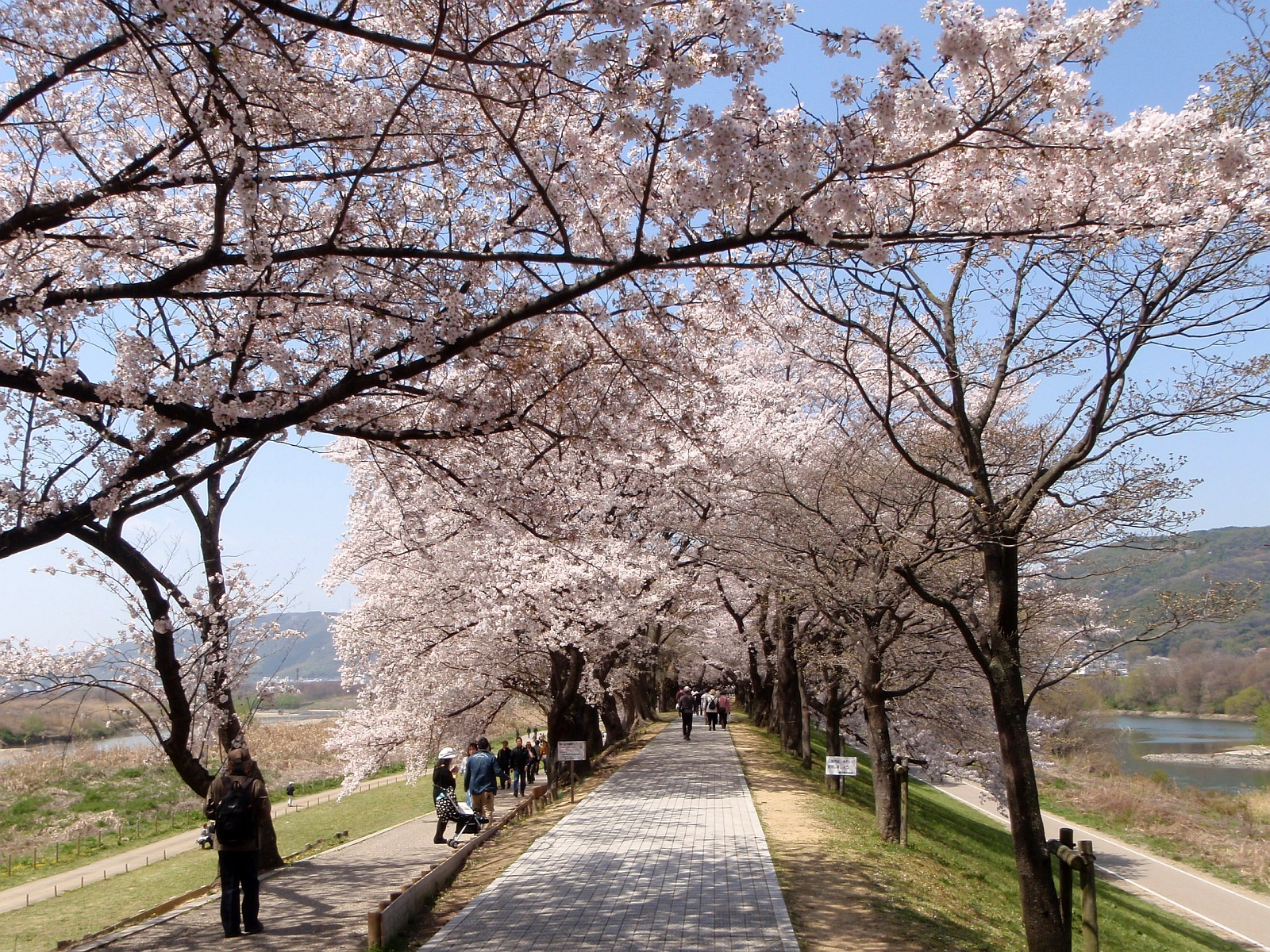
Confluence of Kizu and Yodo Rivers

Yawata (八幡市, Yawata-shi) is a city located in Kyoto Prefecture, Japan. As of 31 July 2023, the city has an estimated population of 69,306 in 33972 households and a population density of 2800 persons per km^{2}. The total area of the city is 24.35 square kilometres (9.40 sq mi). The Iwashimizu Hachiman-gū is located in Yawata.

== Geography ==
Yawata is located in southern Kyoto Prefecture near the confluence of three rivers: the Kizugawa, Ujigawa, and Katsura. Because of the widespread low-lying wetlands prone to such flooding, the old city was located on a natural embankment that was slightly higher than the surrounding area, called Minamiyama. Yawata has several enclaves, located on the border between Fushimi-ku, Kyoto and Kumiyama, and on the border between Kyōtanabe and Hirakata, Osaka.

=== Neighboring municipalities ===
Kyoto Prefecture

- Jōyō
- Kuse District (Kumiyama)
- Kyōtanabe
- Kyoto
- Otokuni District (Ōyamazaki)

Osaka Prefecture

- Hirakata
- Mishima District (Shimamoto)

=== Climate ===
Yawata has a humid subtropical climate (Köppen Cfa) characterized by warm summers and cool winters with light to no snowfall. The average annual temperature in Yawata is 14.5 °C. The average annual rainfall is 1356 mm with September as the wettest month. The temperatures are highest on average in August, at around 26.5 °C, and lowest in January, at around 3.1 °C.

== Demographics ==
Per Japanese census data, the population Yawata has since peaked in the 1990s and has declined slightly. Currently, many people commute to work or study outside the city, such as Hirakata, Kyoto, and Osaka, and the city is included in the Kyoto metropolitan area as an urban employment area.

Historical population
Year	Pop.	±%
1940	13,576	—
1950	16,063	+18.3%
1960	16,322	+1.6%
1970	22,974	+40.8%
1980	64,882	+182.4%
1990	75,758	+16.8%
2000	73,682	−2.7%
2010	74,246	+0.8%
2020	70,433	−5.1%

== History ==
The area of Yawata was part of ancient Yamashiro Province and developed as a town in front of the gates of Iwashimizu Hachiman-gu, a Shinto shrine, which attracted a wide range of worship from the imperial family and samurai to the common people.The town of Yawata in Tsuzuki District, Kyoto were established on April 1, 1889, with the creation of the modern municipalities system. It was elevated to city status on November 1, 1977.

== Government ==
Yawata has a mayor-council form of government with a directly elected mayor and a unicameral city council of 21 members. Yawata contributes two members to the Kyoto Prefectural Assembly. In terms of national politics, the city is part of the Kyoto 6th district of the lower house of the Diet of Japan.

== Economy ==
Yawata has a mixed economy based on commerce, agriculture and light manufacturing. Industries are mainly located along Japan National Route 1 and are concentrated on metal processing. Due to transportation connections, Yawata is also a warehouse and distribution base. Due to its proximity to Osaka and Kyoto, the city is gradually becoming a commuter town.

== Education ==
Yawata has eight public elementary schools and four public junior high schools operated by city government and one public high school operated by the Kyoto Prefectural Board of Education. The prefecture also operates one special education school for the handicapped.

== Transportation ==
=== Railways ===
- Keihan Electric Railway - Keihan Main Line / Ōtō Line

- Hashimoto - Iwashimizu-hachimangū

- Keihan Electric Railway - Keihan Cable Line

- Cable-hachimangū-sanjō - Iwashimizu-hachimangū

=== Highways ===
- Shin-Meishin Expressway
- Keiji Bypass
- Daini Keihan Expressway
- National Route 1
- National Route 478

== Sister cities ==
- Milan, Ohio, United States, sister city since August 12, 1986
- Baoji, Shaanxi, China, partner city since November 2, 1992

== Local attractions ==
- Edison Memorial, as Thomas Alva Edison used bamboo filaments from Yawata for his early light bulb tests
- Iwashimizu Shrine

== Notable people ==
- Hisashi Nogami - video game designer, director, and producer
