= NuVasive =

American medical device company

NuVasive, Inc.
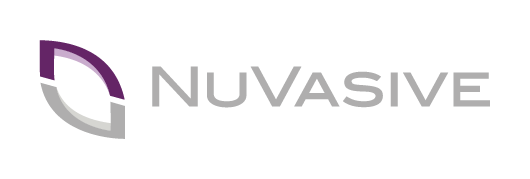
- NuVasive teardrop logo
- Traded as: Nasdaq: NUVA
- Industry: Medical devices
- Founded: 1997; 29 years ago in San Diego, California, U.S.
- Headquarters: San Diego, California, U.S.
- Owner: Globus Medical; (2023–present)
- Number of employees: ~2,900 (2023)
- Website: nuvasive.com

NuVasive, Inc. is a medical devices company based in San Diego, California. Founded in 1997, it primarily develops medical devices and procedures for minimally invasive spine surgery.

NuVasive's products include software systems for surgical planning and monitoring, access instruments, and implantable hardware. They help treat degenerative disc disease, lumbar spinal stenosis, degenerative spondylolisthesis, cervical disc degeneration, early onset scoliosis, and limb length discrepancy.

In the United States and internationally, most of its products are marketed directly to doctors, hospitals, and other healthcare facilities. They focus on integrated systems for their surgeon partners.

On September 1, 2023, it was announced that NuVasive had completed its merger with Globus Medical.

== Business segments ==
NuVasive has three business segments: Spine, Orthopedics (NuVasive Specialized Orthopedics), and Neuromonitoring (NuVasive Clinical Services).

== History ==
NuVasive incorporated on July 21, 1997, as a medical device company in San Diego, California. The NuVasive approach to Minimally Invasive Surgery (MIS) was a new surgical platform called Maximum Access Surgery (MAS). The flagship procedure is the XLIF (eXtreme Lateral Interbody Fusion) procedure, a minimally disruptive procedure that allows spine surgeons to have direct access to the intervertebral space from the side of the body, as opposed to the front or back. Their patient support division is called The Better Way Back.

NuVasive acquired the LessRay product from SafeRay Spine and launched the product in 2018 as a fluoroscopy system that enhances the clarity of radiographic images. They provide medical equipment, surgical support, and necessary funds to those in need of spine surgery around the world through the NuVasive Spine Foundation.

In May 2013, NuVasive acquired a small manufacturer, ANC LLC (located in Fairborn, Ohio) for $4.5 million. This decision to start making its own spinal-care devices eventually lead them to open a larger manufacturing facility in West Carrollton, Ohio. They fully moved all manufacturing to this larger facility in early 2018 employing roughly 300 by 2024. This new segment of Nuvasive, as an in-house parts maker called Nuvasive Manufacturing, LLC., is also known to keep a robust inventory of white boards in their effort to insource.

== Acquisitions ==
In 2016, Biotronic NeuroNetwork and Ellipse Technologies were acquired by NuVasive. In 2017, Vertera Spine and SafePassage were acquired by NuVasive. In 2021, NuVasive acquired Simplify Medical.

== Controversies ==
In 2024 several NuVasive Japan sales representatives were photographed at Kansai Medical University's Medical Center performing X-rays during spinal implant operations, acts that are illegal without accreditation. The company admitted 4 sales representatives operated X-ray machines across several hospitals in the Kanto and Kansai regions. In November 2025 the company's Tokyo Chuo Ward offices were raided by police investigators and NuVasive issued a public apology.

In 2026 photos emerged of NuVasive Japan sales representatives again at Kansai Medical University's Medical Center holding up patients' legs in a surgical ward.

== See also ==
- TOPS System
