= Densha de Go! =

Video game series

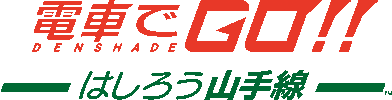
- Logo of Densha de Go!! Hashirou Yamanote Sen
- Genre: Train simulator
- Developers: Taito, Unbalance (PC only), Ongakukan (in cooperation with Taito), Square Enix, Gree
- Publishers: Taito, Square Enix
- Platforms: Arcade, Windows, PlayStation, PlayStation 2, PlayStation 3, PlayStation 4, WonderSwan, Game Boy Color, Nintendo 64, Saturn, Dreamcast, Neo Geo Pocket Color, PlayStation Portable, Wii, Nintendo DS, Nintendo Switch, mobile
- First release: Densha de Go! 1996
- Latest release: Densha de Go!! Hashirou Yamanote Sen; 2020

Densha de Go! (電車でGO!; "Let's Go by Train!") is a Japanese train simulation game series originally produced by Taito and more recently by Square Enix (who purchased Taito) and Railfan Holdings Co., Ltd. The series started with a 1996 arcade version and was first released in a home version for the PlayStation in 1997. There are also PC versions released by the Japanese publisher Unbalance. All of the games in the series are exclusively available in Japanese.

== Gameplay ==
Each Densha de Go title contains actual train (or tram) routes based on real services in Japan. For the most part, the user's task is to drive the train and adhere to a very exacting timetable, including stopping at stations to within as little as 30 cm of a prescribed stopping point, ideally within half a second of the scheduled arrival time. While the specifics vary slightly between versions, the user is expected to obey speed limits and other posted signs, sound a warning for work parties along the track, arrive at between-station waypoints on time, and perform similar tasks.

Densha de Go differ from Ongakukan's Train Simulator series primarily in that while the Ongakukan series uses video taken from cameras mounted to the front of real-world trains for its graphics, Densha de Go titles rely upon computer-drawn graphics.

== History ==
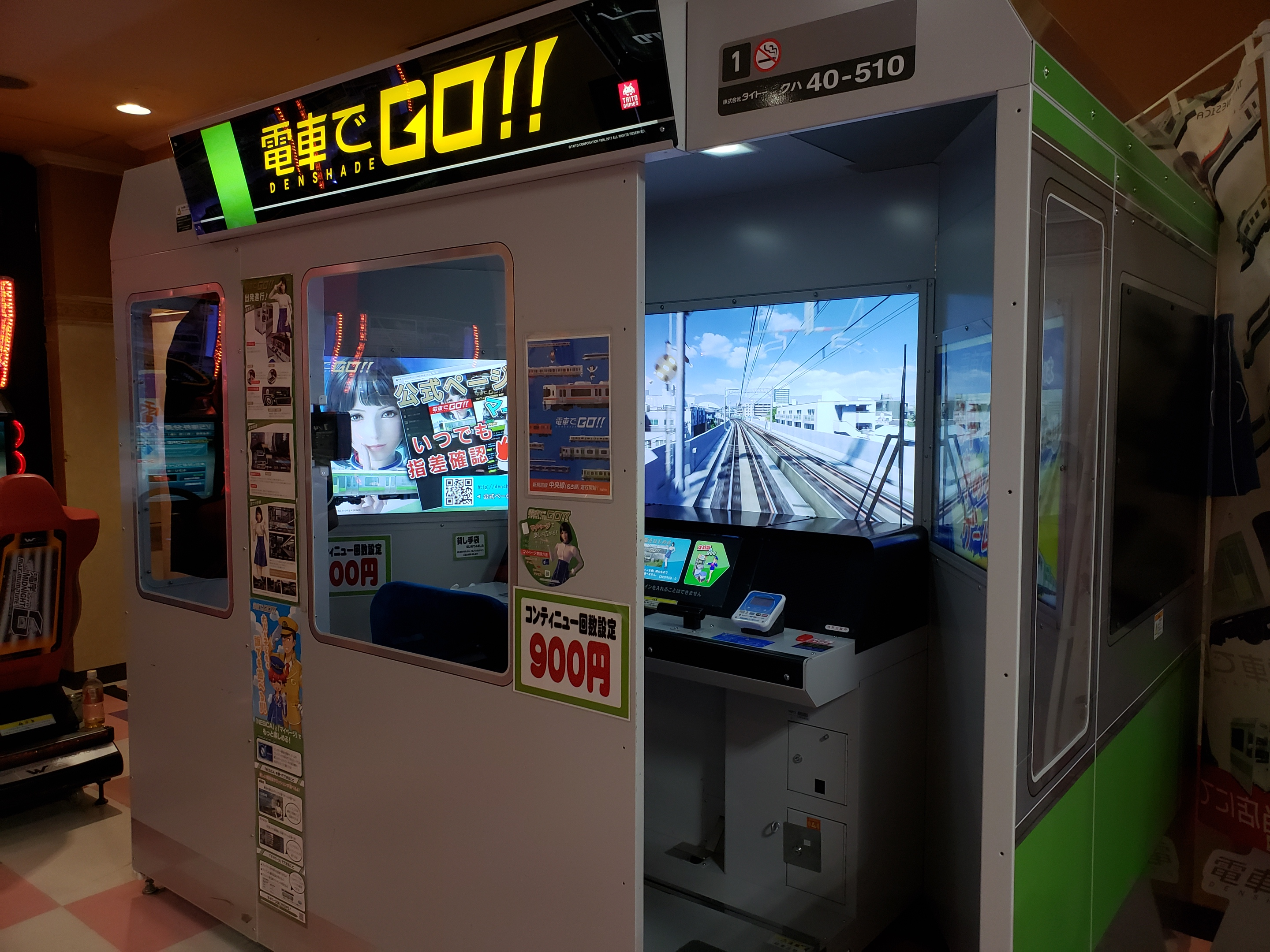

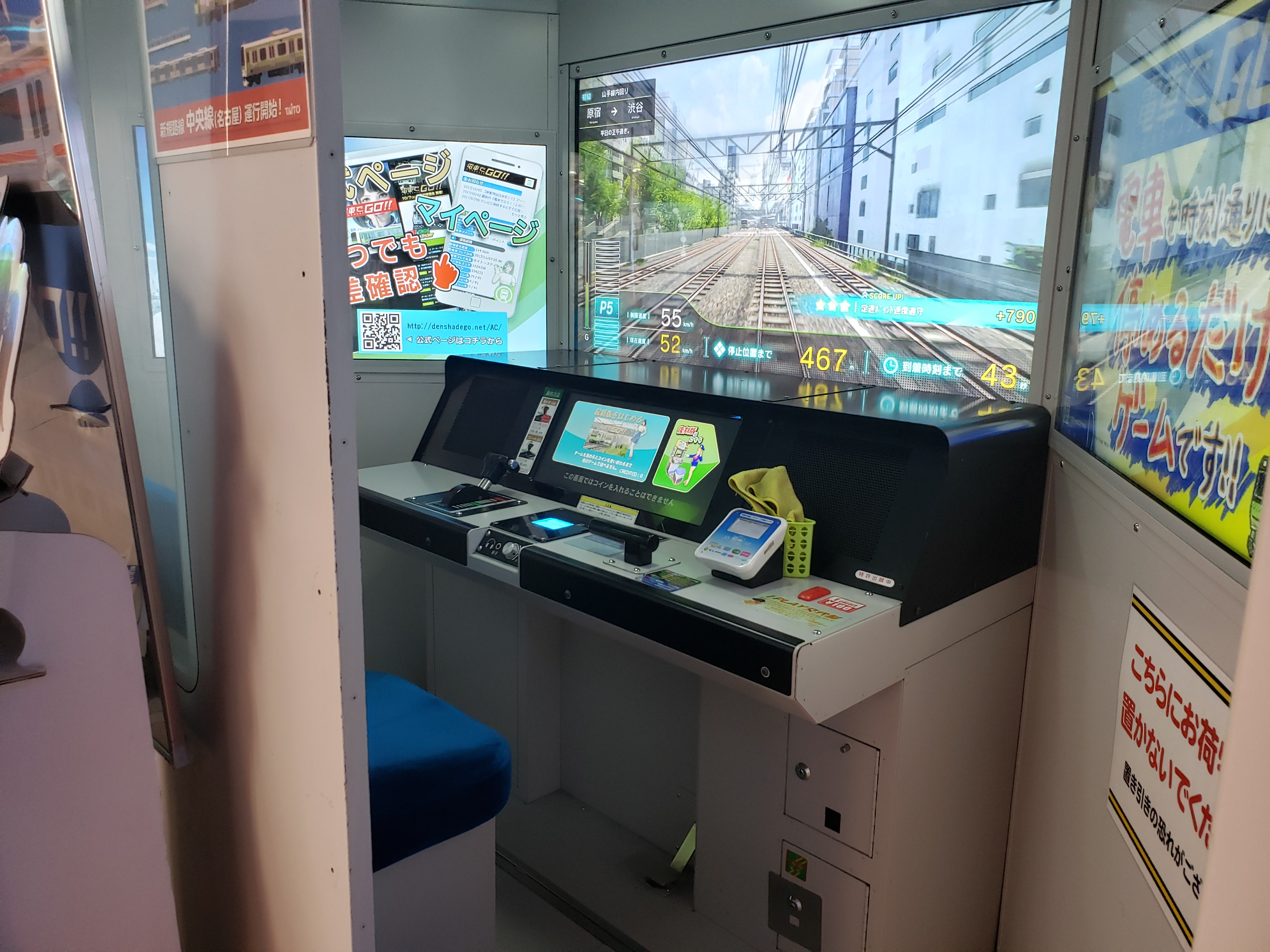
A Densha De Go!! (2017) arcade cabinet

The concept for a train-based video game originated at Taito around 1991–1992, but was initially shelved because management considered trains "plain and boring." Programmer Akira Saito developed the idea based on his observations of the popular Yamanote Line simulation machine at Tokyo's Transportation Museum in Akihabara, which consistently drew crowds of all ages. When Saito formally proposed the concept around 1996, Taito was divided between supporters and skeptics who questioned the appeal of train simulation in an arcade market dominated by fighting and racing games. Support from train enthusiast employees within Taito helped secure approval for the project.

Official development began in July 1996 with a compressed timeline of three to four months. The small team consisted of Akira Saito as lead programmer and planner, Masayuki Kikuchi and Masaya Kinoshita as programmers, Yukihiro Moriyama handling graphics, and Tetsuyu Yamaro creating the opening demo. The team decided early to use real Japanese train lines and stations rather than fictional locations, and invested heavily in an authentic control panel despite management cost concerns. Saito argued the control panel represented "80% of the game" and insisted on functional elements like working pressure gauges and authentic lever mechanisms.

During development, several features were cut including a "reckless driving mode" that would have allowed players to skip stations, and fantastical elements were abandoned in favor of realism. The game launched in Japanese arcades in 1997 to immediate success.

In general, simulation games such as Densha de Go! or Tokimeki Memorial were more popular in Japan than in America which preferred more action oriented video games.

The 2004 title Densha de Go Final! was so named to signal that it was intended to be the last in the series. While still popular in an absolute numbers sense, the series had lost the novelty of its heyday while development costs for individual titles continued to climb due to the detailed virtual worlds that needed to be created.

Taito and Ongakukan subsequently released a few co-produced titles for PlayStation 2, PlayStation Portable, PlayStation 3, and iOS with the title Railfan. Taito also divided the four routes in Densha de Go! Final into separate titles and released them on the PSP system.

In April 2010, 5 years after Square Enix acquired Taito Corporation as a wholly owned subsidiary, Densha de Go! Special Version -- Revived! Showa Yamanote Line was released for the Nintendo DS on July 22 the same year. This was a departure from the traditional publisher and distributor of Densha de Go, Taito. Densha de Go! Special Version—Revived! Showa Yamanote Line offers a variety of trains to control, from the early Yamanote Line up through the current rolling stock. Exclusive to the Nintendo DS, the controls are completely stylus driven, unlike the variety of custom controls offered in non-handheld versions.

In June 2011 a version of the game also covering the Yamanote line was released for Apple's iOS (only available in the Japanese App Store). There is the option of using a simulated "master controller" on the screen or using touchscreen buttons to move the lever up and down.

Unbalance, who had long supported the franchise by publishing ports of each title to the Windows platform in Japan for over a decade, discontinued the last of its released Densha de Go! titles from retail as of August 2011. The company had been steadily discontinuing titles beginning with the "1480¥ Series", so-called due to their price point and comprised the earliest titles, in late 2010/early 2011 as supplies depleted. Later-released titles in the series—the "1980¥ Series"—were the last to be discontinued as of August 2011. A line of custom USB controllers for the series had been discontinued even earlier and now command a large premium on sites such as Yahoo! Auctions Japan. Support through Windows 7 compatibility guides, FAQs and patches remains available through the Unbalance site, however.

In 2017 Taito, which is now owned by Square Enix, released a new arcade cabinet in commemoration of the 20th anniversary of the game series. According to an article from Geek: "The cabinet includes four displays, three of which act as windows showing the track and simulated outside world, whereas the fourth forms the dashboard the player sits at. All the buttons from a real train are present, as are the two physical controls required to make the train move". They also released a new mobile game for Android and iOS in Winter 2016.

== Densha de Go! controllers ==
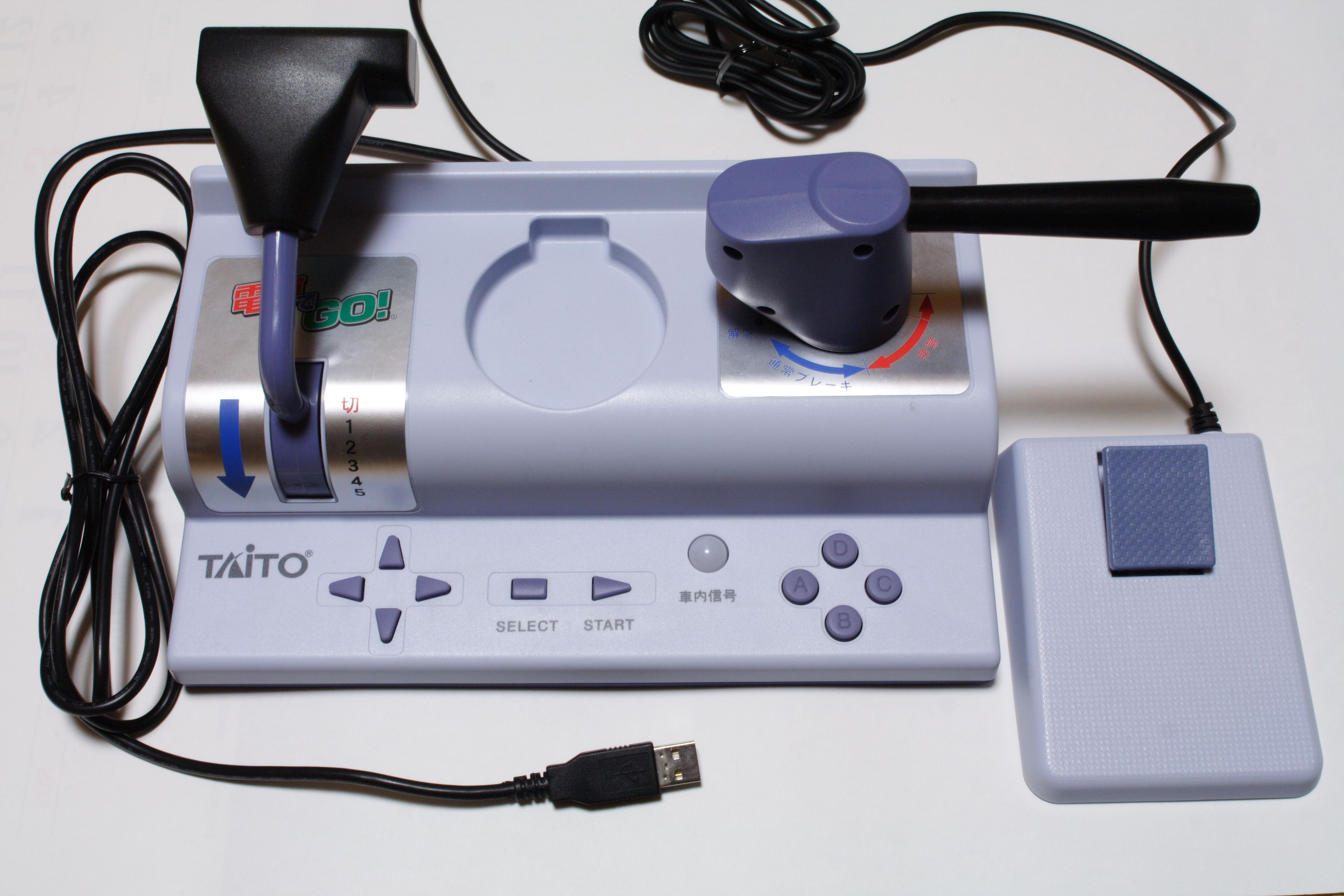
Densha de Go! Type 2 Controller

A large number of hardware train controllers were available for a number of platforms (PC, PS, PS2, Saturn, Wii, N64, etc.) for which Densha de Go was available. This included versions that had buttons, levers, and pedals to suggest real-world train controllers, including traditional brake-and-throttle train controllers, "mascon"-type controllers (single lever for throttle and brake), shinkansen controllers, and tram controllers (ostensibly similar to the traditional brake-and-throttle style, but with different styling).

One of the most extravagant controllers for the Densha de Go! series was the Shinkansen Controller, which was released with the Densha de Go! Shinkansen EX game for both the Wii and PS2. The Shinkansen Controller for the PS2 comes with a LED screen display of speed and controls and a foot pedal to blow the horn, whereas the Shinkansen Controller for the Wii lacked these features, replacing the LED screen with a representative sticker. The Wii version of this controller commands much higher prices than the PS2 version only by virtue of relative rarity.

== Versions ==
Game	Details
Densha de Go!: JP: 1996; – Arcade PlayStation PC Sega Saturn WonderSwan Game Boy Color	Notes: This is the first game in the series.; Coverage: San'in Main Line (Sagano Line), Keihin-Tōhoku Line, Tōkaidō Line (JR Kyoto Line) and Yamanote Line (portions of each of these).; By the standard of later titles, this game was very strict, demanding that the user memorize routes. This strictness was caused by the fidelity of the PS1 and PC versions to the arcade version, where it was generally hoped normal users would not play for more than a few minutes per payment for economic reasons.; A later version for arcades was released, named Densha de Go! EX. The Saturn version and later printings of the PC version are based on this version.; It received a "Gold Prize" from Sony in May 1998, indicating sales above 500,000 units in Japan.
Densha de Go! 2 Kōsoku-hen: JP: 1998; – Arcade PlayStation Nintendo 64 PC Dreamcast Game Boy Color WonderSwan Neo Geo Pocket	Notes: Coverage: Akita Shinkansen, Hokuetsu Express Hokuhoku Line, Keihin-Tōhoku Line (portions each).; An updated version named Densha de Go! 2 Kōsoku-hen 3000-bandai was released for the arcade and PC; this version was used as the base for the Dreamcast and Nintendo 64 versions. This version added the Ōu Main Line, Tazawako Line, Tōkaidō Main Line (JR Kobe Line) and Yamanote Line.; The Nintendo 64 version was released as Densha de Go! 64. This added both a new Beginner mode and Voice Recognition Unit compatibility.; The PlayStation version was the only home console version not to be based on the 3000-bandai version, but it exclusively added the Osaka Loop Line and Kagoshima Main Line.; The overall trackage was significantly greater than in the original Densha de Go. However, this game was likewise quite strict.
Densha de Go! Professional Shiyō: JP: 1999; – PlayStation PC	Notes: Same lines as Densha de Go! and Densha de Go! 2 Kōsoku-hen, as well as some Kantō area portions of the Tōkaidō Line.; Reduced some of the strictness of the previous games through a number of features, including the addition of a panel at left which allowed the user to see a map of the upcoming track segment, including showing speed limits, which greatly reduced the required amount of track memorization, and allowed the player more time to react. The overall reduction of strictness in the game reflected Taito's shift in emphasis from arcade to home-play versions as time went on.
Densha de Go! Nagoya Tetsudō-hen: JP: 2000; – PlayStation PC	Notes: Featured railways belonging to the Nagoya Meitetsu private railway company.; Coverage: Meitetsu Nagoya Line, Meitetsu Inuyama Line, Meitetsu Minomachi Line and Meitetsu Monkey Park Monorail Line.; This was the first version to feature a monorail.; This version also featured a Meitetsu hybrid light rail route which ran both on regular train lines and as a sort of urban tram on special lanes in city streets. Part of the gameplay of this required the user to stop for regular traffic signals and avoid car traffic. This was the Densha de Go player's first opportunity to drive a vehicle much lighter (and thus shorter stopping distance) than standard trains.; The gameplay, physics, and strictness of this version were all somewhat relaxed compared to previous versions.; Unique to this release is a series of minigames called "Onecon de DO?" which uses the features of the Densha de GO! One Handle Controller to perform various simulated tasks including stamping papers, rescuing people from a burning building, and validating train tickets.
Kisha De Go!: JP: 2000; – PlayStation PC	Notes: This version of the game allows players to drive a steam train, rather than an electric train like the other entries.; The coverage included portions of the Keihin-Tōhoku Line, Shin'etsu Main Line and Ban'etsu-Sai Line.; The controls were modified to reflect steam operation.
Densha de Go! 3 Tsūkin-hen: JP: 2000; – Arcade PS2 PC	Notes: Coverage: Sasaguri Line, Kagoshima Main Line, San'yō Main Line (JR Kobe Line), San'in Main Line, Chūō Main Line, and Chūō-Sōbu Line.; Was the first version to use a new, much improved 3D graphics engine with different GUI, better models and textures, and more realistic depiction of truck features, including signaling and game world overall.; While previous versions of the game allowed for the same route to be run during day or night, this was the first version in which the user could see the time of day dynamically changing as the ride progressed.; The game was later re-released with improvements as Densha de Go! 3 Tsūkin-hen Daiya Kaisei.
Densha de Go! Ryojōhen: JP: 2000; – Arcade PS2 PC	Notes: This version focused on trams and light rail.; Coverage: Iyotetsu Matsuyama City Line, Enoden Line, Randen Arashiyama Main Line, Randen Kitano Line, Hakodate City Tram Line Route 5 and 2.; Trams could be viewed externally and also in a cab view.; In this version, the player is also responsible for making station announcements and opening the door on the correct side.; Due to the overall gentler nature of this game, it is harder to get a game over compared to early Densha de Go versions. Continues are plentiful and, while timetables exist, they can be ignored completely or simply looked at generally for much of the basic play. That said, unlocking some tram variants requires accurate completion of some scheduled routes.
Densha de Go! Shinkansen San'yō Shinkansen-hen: JP: 2002; – PS2 PC Wii	Notes: Coverage included the San'yō Shinkansen and Hakata Minami Line.; Again, this version featured a significantly different graphics engine.; Innovations included graphic interludes which showed routine passenger activities and the optional ability to see both the train from the outside and see a detailed, 3-dimensional cab view from the inside.; Breaking the trend to this point, this title demanded more exact driving by the user - often as little as half a second to correctly respond to speed limit change indications.; The original PS2 release (v1.06) suffered from massive performance issues. A patched version (v2.01) was released soon after launch, branded under the Playstation 2 The Best line. This version fixed most of the performance problems, but removed the catenary wires from the game's graphics.; Re-released in updated form in 2007 for the Wii as Densha de Go! Shinkansen EX Sanyō Shinkansen-hen (電車でGO！新幹線EX 山陽新幹線編).
Densha de Go! Professional 2: JP: 2003; – PS2 PC	Notes: Coverage included the Shōnan-Shinjuku Line, Tsurumi Line, Kosei Line, Seto-Ōhashi Line, Nagasaki Main Line and Sasebo Line.; Unique elements to this game included the crossing of the Seto-Ōhashi bridge, a trip which involves the changing of the driver and the coupling and de-coupling of the train.
Train Simulator + Densha de Go! Tōkyō Kyūkō-hen: JP: 2003; – PS2 PSP	Notes: Tōkyū Tōyoko Line, Tōkyū Den-en-toshi Line, and Tōkyū Ōimachi Line; A cross-over with the Train Simulator series. Like that series it uses full motion video, but uses a version of the Densha de Go gameplay user interface.; The game was re-released for PSP in 2005 under the name of Mobile Train Simulator + Densha de Go! Tōkyō Kyūkō-hen.
Densha de Go! Final: JP: 2004; – PS2 PC PSP (as separate titles for each line)	Notes: Coverage: (the complete) Yamanote Line, (Rapid) Chūō Line, (the complete) Osaka Loop Line, and (much of the) Tōkaidō Main Line (specifically, the JR Kyoto Line and JR Kobe Line). The (Rapid) Chūō Line as modeled represents the period during which the tracks west of Mitaka were undergoing substantial engineering work connected to the eventual (and now completed) track elevation project.; Features a large number of trains and the most advanced and detailed graphics of the series (although many textures look artificial and undersaturated).; Trains can be seen from external views, but there are again no internal cabs.; Gameplay innovations include conductor mode where the player acts as station announcer and door opener rather than driver. This requires the user to have memorized (or have readily available) a list of the stations.; There appears to be relatively little time and intra-station compression in this game - distances are more prototypical. Furthermore, scheduled routes and timetables are more prototypical.; Each line was ported to the PSP as an individual game, under the Densha de Go! Pocket titles.
Densha de Go! Special Version—Revived! Showa Yamanote Line: JP: 2010; – Nintendo DS	Notes: Covers the Yamanote Line's historical rolling stock through present along with several other tacked-on trains and lines.
Card no Renketsu Densha de Go!: JP: 2011; – Arcade	Notes: An arcade game released only in Japan that can be playable through collectible cards, they are inserted in the machine and unlock a train, each card has a different train.
Densha de Go!!: JP: 2017; – Arcade	Notes: A continuously updated arcade game created in Unreal engine. It has three screens for a panoramic view of the line.; Coverage: Yamanote Line (Harajuku to Ueno and Ikebukuro to Shinjuku), Chūō-Sōbu Line (Ichigaya to Akihabara), Osaka Loop Line (Morinomiya to Ōsaka), Hanshin Main Line (Daimotsu to Kōshien), Chūō Main Line (Ōzone to Nagoya), Meitetsu Nagoya Main Line (Jingū-mae to Sakō), Keihin–Tōhoku Line (Shinagawa to Tabata).; A "Reprint" mode was added that lets players play remade versions of the first two games, Densha de Go! and Densha de Go! 2 Kōsoku-hen 3000-bandai.; Both a full size DX cabinet and Compact version are available.
Densha de Go! Plug & Play: JP: 2018 / 2020 (re-issued); – Stand alone unit	Notes: Featured routes: Yamanote Line, Chuo Line (Tokyo-Takao), Osaka Loop Line, Kyoto Line / Kobe Line (Kyoto-Osaka-Kobe).; This is a self-contained HD version port of Densha de Go! Final housed within the controller hardware itself.; Some licensed audio from the original game (like station departure melodies, announcements and musical horns) was removed.; The original 2018 release was available in yellow (with blue buttons and handles) and black (exclusive to Ebten). The 2020 re-issue is only available in dark grey.; Like Shinkansen, the initial release suffered from a number of bugs and performance issues. These were resolved with the v1.13 software update, requiring existing owners to return their units to Taito to perform the update. Newer units include the v1.13 update as standard.; Comes with audio CD with 2 tunes, 'Densha de Densha de GO! GO! GO!' and 'Densha de Densha de GO! GO! GO! (1997 LIVE at SHIBUYA ON AIR EAST)'.
Densha de Go!! Kids: JP: 2019; – Arcade	Notes: A version of the 2017 arcade game designed for children.; The cabinet features a bench with room for a parent to sit with their child.; Gameplay features colourful cartoon obstacles such as leaves that must be wiped off the window or birds that must be alerted with the horn.
Densha de Go!! Hashirou Yamanote-sen: JP: 2020; – PlayStation 4, Nintendo Switch	Notes: Based on the 2017 arcade game Densha de Go!!.; Includes the full Yamanote Line, Chūō–Sōbu Line (Ichigaya to Akihabara), and portions of the following lines running parallel to the Yamanote Line: Saikyō Line, Keihin–Tōhoku Line, Ueno-Tokyo Line and Narita Express.; In addition to the E235 and E231 Series 500 trains from the arcade version, the home version includes historical 205 series and 103 series Yamanote Line trains.; Home console exclusive modes include a brand-new "Driver's Way" objective-based mode, Daily Roulette mode, and a free-play mode.; Popular Yamanote Line and Chūō–Sōbu Line missions from the arcade release are also included.; The PS4 version supports PlayStation VR for selected missions.; The Nintendo Switch version features some touch screen functions from the arcade version.; Zuiki released a train controller for the Nintendo Switch version. It is not compatible with the Playstation 4 version.
Densha de Go! Plug & Play 2 Shinkansen EX: JP: 2023; – Stand alone unit	Notes: Featured routes: San'yō Shinkansen and Hakata Minami Line.; This is a self-contained HD version port of Densha de Go! Shinkansen EX Sanyō Shinkansen-hen housed within the controller hardware itself.

== Parody ==
A doujin manga and game series, Densha de D, is a parody crossover of the series in combination with the auto racing-based franchise Initial D; it is popularly associated with a meme regarding "multi-track drifting".
