= Densha de Go! 2 Kōsoku-hen =

1998 simulation game

Densha de Go! 2
- Densha de Go! 64 box art
- Developer: Taito
- Publisher: Taito
- Series: Densha de Go!
- Platforms: Arcade, PlayStation, Nintendo 64, WonderSwan, Neo Geo Pocket Color, Dreamcast, Game Boy Color
- Release: 1998: Arcade; JP: March 1998; JP: by September 1998 (3000-bandai); PlayStation; JP: March 18, 1999; Nintendo 64; JP: July 30, 1999; WonderSwan; JP: October 7, 1999; Neo Geo Pocket Color; JP: October 21, 1999; Dreamcast; JP: January 20, 2000; Game Boy Color; JP: December 8, 2000
- Genre: Vehicle simulation game
- Mode: Single-player

Densha de Go! 2 Kōsoku-hen (Japanese: 電車でGO!2 高速編; "Go by Train! 2: High Speed Volume") is a train simulator video game developed and published by Taito, part of the Densha de Go! series. The goal of the game is to complete a route with a train; the player can drive bullet, local, and express trains throughout Tokyo, Osaka, and the Japanese countryside. Featuring a score system, the player can either earn or lose score points by following or not following the rules of the game.

Initially released for arcade machines in 1998, it was then ported to PlayStation, Nintendo 64, WonderSwan, Neo Geo Pocket Color, Dreamcast, and Game Boy Color throughout 1999 and 2000. The Nintendo 64 version is titled Densha de Go! 64 (Japanese: 電車でGO!64). Reviewers found the technical elements, such as the user interface, Voice Recognition Unit system, and audio, to be well-implemented, while they had mixed opinions on the graphics and gameplay, noting that the game is difficult.

== Gameplay ==
A screenshot showing the player driving a train

Densha de Go! 2 is a train simulator video game in which the player drives trains, such as the Shinkansen bullet trains, local trains, and express trains, throughout Tokyo, Osaka, and the Japanese countryside. The main difference between local trains and express ones is that local trains stop at every station. Played from a first-person perspective, the game also features a graphical user interface and railway signals to help the player with controlling the train. The goal of the game is to complete a route with a train.

Densha de Go! 2 also has a score system, which counts whether the player followed the rules, drove safely, and met the train schedule, while the score system could be negatively impacted by braking a lot, missing a scheduled stop, or forgetting to beep the horn. A train has several acceleration settings, brake levels, and an emergency brake. Besides railway signals, there are also speed limits and threats on the railway. The player can earn a star if the ride goes well.

Unique to the Nintendo 64 version is a Beginner Mode which lets the player learn the basics of driving a train. The Nintendo 64 version also features the Tokaido Line.

== Development and release ==
Densha de Go! 2 was developed and published by the Japanese company Taito. The game was exhibited at the February 1998 AOU Show, and first released for arcades in March 1998, with a modified 3000-bandai version released by September the same year. It was then ported to PlayStation and released on March 18, 1999, alongside a premium pack.

Taito then ported the PlayStation version to Nintendo 64, under the name Densha de Go! 64, releasing it on July 30, 1999. Supporting the Voice Recognition Unit (VRU) microphone accessory alongside Hey You, Pikachu!, there is also a special train-driving controller that was sold separately, which simulates train controls. The controller has two handles, a throttle and a brake. Other consoles also have similar editions of the controller. Despite being a port, Taito said that it was a "complete remake". In an interview with the magazine 64Dream, marketing director Takumi Toyota said that they intended to target younger audiences since releasing the PlayStation version, but was unsure whether the company had been successful regarding that, noting that a parent with knowledge about trains should advise a younger player on how to play a game. Taito promoted the game on train- and game-related events and fairs.

A WonderSwan version was released on October 7, 1999, and a Neo Geo Pocket Color version was released on October 21 the same year. A month later, Taito announced that the game would be ported over to Dreamcast, ultimately releasing on January 20, 2000. On Dreamcast, the graphics are pixelated and feature a framerate of 30 frames per second; there are also load times. A Game Boy Color version was released on December 8, 2000. It is not compatible with Game Boy Advance.

== Reception ==
Reception

Review scores
Publication	Score
Famitsu	8/10 9/10 7/10 8/10 (PS); 8/10 9/10 8/10 7/10 (N64)
IGN	5.1/10
Nintendo Life	7/10

Edge called the game "inexplicably popular". In Japan, Game Machine listed Densha de Go! 2 in their April 15, 1998, issue as being the third most-successful dedicated arcade game of the year.

The graphics received mixed opinions from critics. Peer Schneider of IGN, reviewing the Nintendo 64 version, criticized the graphics, calling them blurry and ugly, while a Famitsu reviewer praised it, such as the looks of the environment of new routes. Martin Watts of Nintendo Life also criticized the graphics, particularly character sprites.

Critics also had mixed opinions on the gameplay. Schneider found the game dull, noting that although its trains and stations corresponded to real ones, it lacked features, such as train announcements, opening and closing the door, as well as switching into reverse. Watts said that the game tries to accurately emulate a real train-driving experience, though he notes that operating a Japanese train is difficult, demanding precision and accuracy. Famitsu, reviewing the PlayStation version, noted that the game had a high difficulty level.

However, reviewers had positive opinions on the game's technical elements. Famitsu wrote that the user interface was improved in comparison with the arcade version for the PlayStation version, while also enjoying the game without the special controller. Regarding the Nintendo 64 version, they found the voice recognition support to be good, but hard to use; they also commended the audio, alongside Watts.

== Legacy ==
On April 1, 2017, an English fan translation patch for Densha De Go! 64 was released. Developed by Nintendo 64 ROM hacker "zoinkity" and translator "mikeryan", the patch translates all HUD and menu elements to English, as well as implementing English-language support for the North American version of the VRU peripheral.

The Yumenova Museum opened a theme park in 2024 in Chikusei, Ibaraki Prefecture featuring a decommissioned train where players can play the Densha de Go! franchise, including Densha de Go! 2 and its sequel Densha de Go! 3. The Densha de Go!! for arcades introduced parts of Densha de Go! 2 in 2019.
