= Kansai Medical University Hospital =

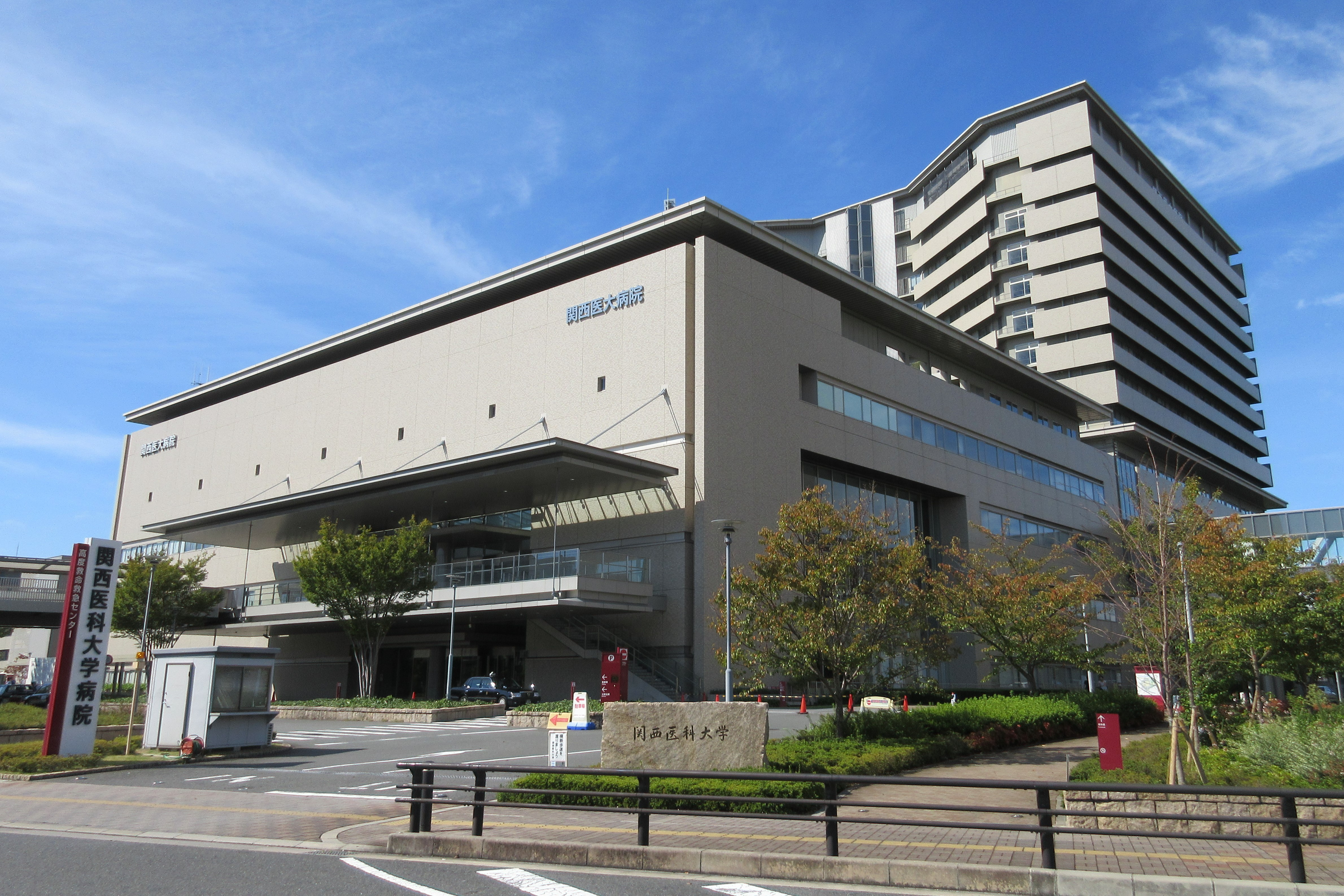
- Main building

Geography
- Location: Hirakata, Osaka, Japan
- Coordinates: 34°49′3″N 135°38′42″E

Organisation
- Type: Teaching
- Affiliated university: Kansai Medical University

Services
- Beds: 751

History
- Opened: 2006

Links
- Website: www.kmu.ac.jp/hirakata/

Kansai Medical University Hospital (関西医科大学附属病院, Kansai ika daigaku fuzoku byōin) is a university hospital located in Hirakata, Osaka, Japan, affiliated with Kansai Medical University (KMU).

== History ==
When Kansai Medical University moved to another site that was used for a factory before, a new hospital was also built and opened as Kansai Medical University Hirakata Hospital in 2006. When it was opened, the former hospital was renamed Kansai Medical University Takii Hospital (Nowadays General Medical Center), and the former campuses in Takii and in Makino were also integrated into the new campus. The new Hirakata Campus of KMU was opened next to the hospital in 2013, and the new hospital was renamed Kansai Medical University Hospital in 2016.

== Medical Departments ==
This hospital has following departments:

- Hematology-Oncology
- Respiratory Oncology
- Respiratory Medicine, Infectious Diseases
- Cardiological Medicine
- Renal Medicine
- Endocrine Medicine
- Diabetes
- Gastrointestinal and Hepatic Medicine
- Psychosomatic Medicine
- General Clinical Department
- Neurology
- Neuropsychiatry
- Pediatrics
- Hepatic Surgery
- Biliary Pancreatic Surgery
- Gastrointestinal Surgery
- Pediatric Surgery
- Breast Surgery
- Cardiovascular Surgery
- Pediatric Cardiovascular Surgery
- General Thoracic Surgery
- Neurosurgery
- Pediatric Neurosurgery
- Orthopedic Surgery
- Plastic and Reconstructive Surgery
- Dermatology
- Urology
- Ophthalmology
- Otolaryngology, Head and Neck Surgery
- Dentistry and Oral Surgery
- Radiotherapy
- Obstetrics and Gynecology
- Anesthesiology
- Clinical Laboratory Medicine
- Pathology and Diagnostics
- Emergency and Critical Care Medicine
- Rehabilitation
- Rheumatology and Clinical Immunology
- Health Sciences
- Peripheral Vascular Surgery

== Access ==
- Hirakatashi Station

== See also ==
- Kansai Medical University
