= Hashimoto Station (Kyoto) =

Railway station in Yawata, Kyoto Prefecture, Japan

Hashimoto Station 橋本駅
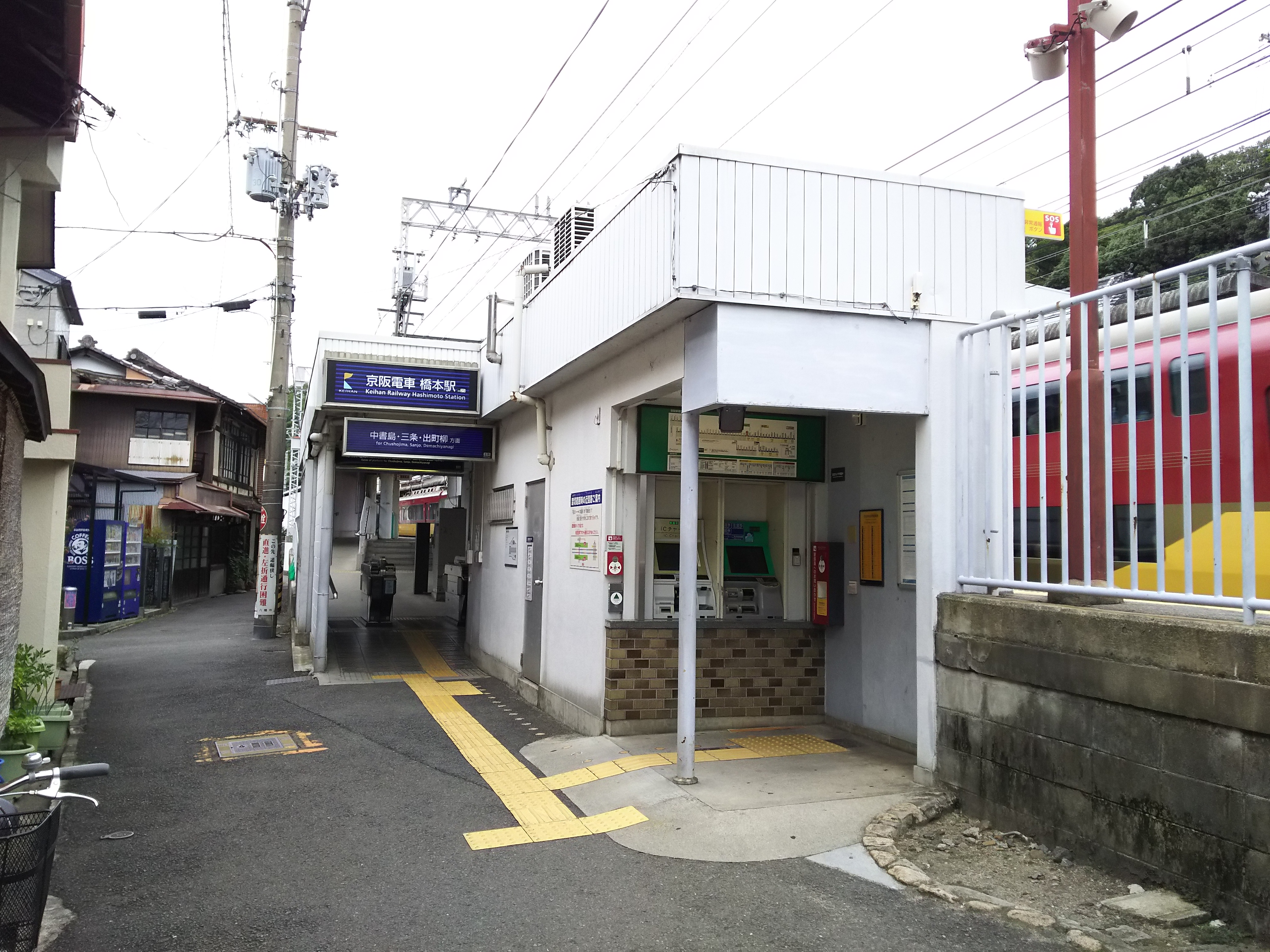
- Hashimoto Station, September 2007

General information
- Location: Nakanocho Hashimoto, Yawata-shi, Kyoto-fu 614-8341; Japan
- Coordinates: 34°52′54.01″N 135°41′2.76″E
- System: Keihan Railway commuter rail station
- Operator: Keihan Electric Railway
- Line: ■ Keihan Main Line
- Distance: 30.1 km from Yodoyabashi
- Platforms: 2 side platforms

Other information
- Station code: KH25
- Website: Official website

History
- Opened: 15 April 1910; 116 years ago

Passengers
- FY2019: 5,932 daily

Services
Preceding station	Keihan Electric Railway	Following station
Kuzuha towards Yodoyabashi	Keihan Main Line Local Sub-Express	Iwashimizu-hachimangū towards Sanjō
Location
- Location within Kyoto Prefecture Location within Japan

Hashimoto Station (橋本駅, Hashimoto-eki) is a passenger railway station located in the city of Yawata, Kyoto, Japan, operated by the private transportation company, Keihan Electric Railway.

== Lines ==
Hashimoto Station is served by the Keihan Main Line and is located 30.1 rail kilometers from the terminus of the line at Yodoyabashi Station.

== Station layout ==
The station consists of two opposed side platforms. The platforms are not connected within the station premises, and passengers wishing to change platform must exit the station and re-enter from the opposite side.

=== Platforms ===
1	■ ■ Keihan Main Line	For Sanjō, and Demachiyanagi
2	■ ■ Keihan Main Line	For Yodoyabashi

== Adjacent stations ==
«	Service	»
Keihan Railway Keihan Main Line
Rapid Limited Express for Demachiyanagi (快速特急): Does not stop at this station
Limited Express (特急): Does not stop at this station
Commuter Rapid Express for Nakanoshima (通勤快急): Does not stop at this station
Rapid Express (快速急行): Does not stop at this station
Express (急行): Does not stop at this station
Kuzuha	Commuter Sub Express for Yodoyabashi or Nakanoshima (通勤準急)	Iwashimizu-hachimangū
Kuzuha	Sub Express (準急)	Iwashimizu-hachimangū
Kuzuha	Local (普通)	Iwashimizu-hachimangū

== History ==
Hashimoto Station opened on 15 April 1910 at the same time as the opening of the Keihan Main Line.

== Passenger statistics ==
In fiscal 2019, the station was used by an average of 5,932 passengers daily.

== Surrounding area ==
- Site of Yamazaki Bridge over the Yodo River
- former Hashimoto red light district
- Residential area (Hashimoto Kibogaoka)

== See also ==
- List of railway stations in Japan
