= Osaka Dental University =

Dental school in Osaka Prefecture, Japan

- 大阪歯科大学
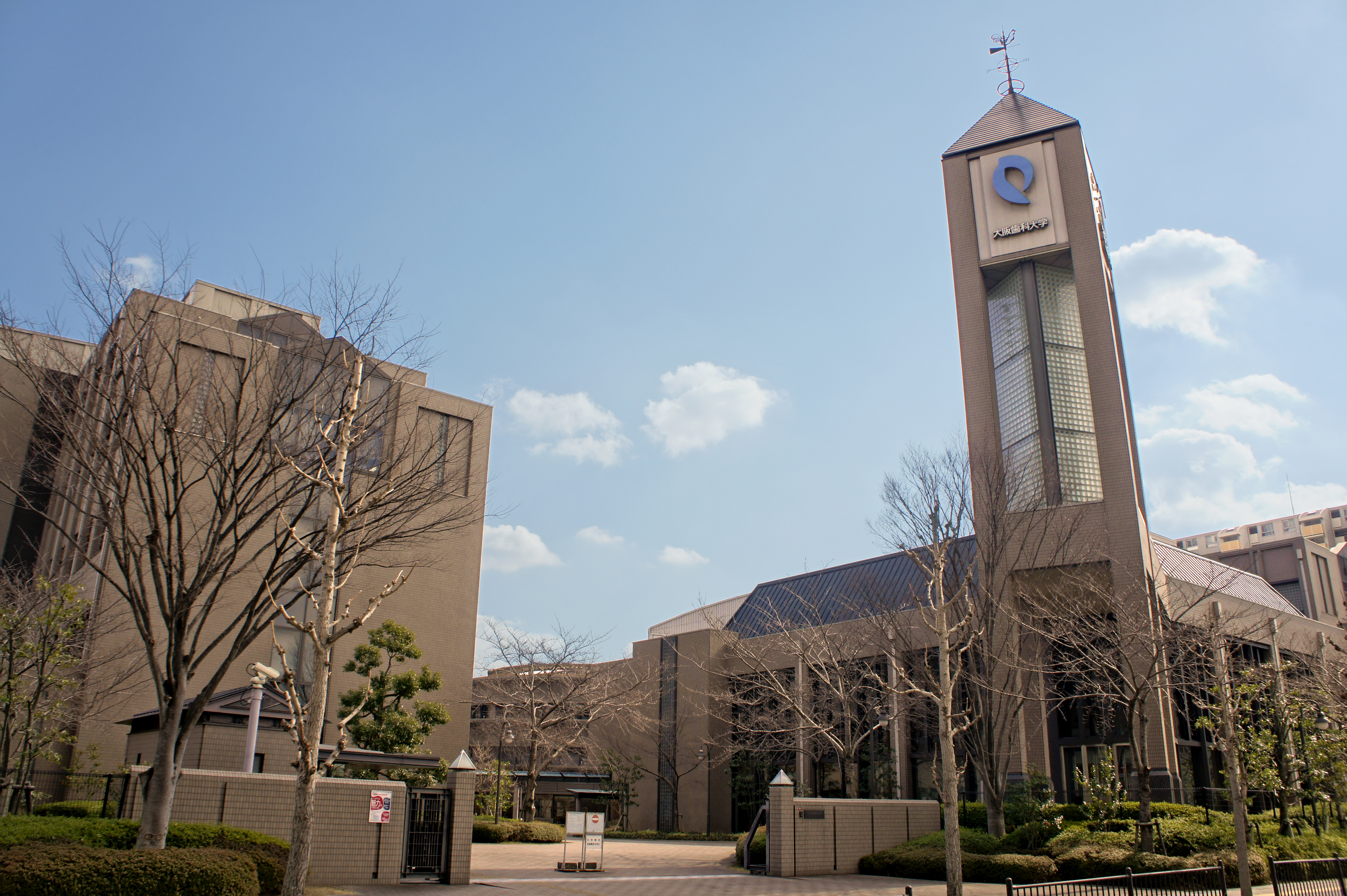
- Type: Private university
- Established: 1911
- Location: Hirakata, Osaka Prefecture, Japan
- Campus: Kuzuha Campus 34°51′31″N 135°40′34″E Makino Campus 34°50′27″N 135°40′11″E Temmabashi Campus 34°41′23″N 135°31′10″E
- Website: http://www.osaka-dent.ac.jp/english/

Osaka Dental University (大阪歯科大学, Ōsaka shika daigaku) is a private university in Hirakata, Osaka, Japan. The predecessor of the school was founded in 1911, and it was chartered as a university in 1947. There is a hospital associated with the university located near Temmabashi Station in Chūō-ku, Osaka.
