= Train Simulator (Ongakukan) =

Japanese series of train simulation video games

Train Simulator (トレインシミュレーター, Torein Shimyurētā, or abbreviated "TS") is a Japanese train simulation game series produced by Ongakukan. The game is significant as it was one of the earliest of its kind since the series started in 1995. No titles were released outside of Asia until the 2022 title JR East Train Simulator.

The original Train Simulator series (1995–2000) was designed from technology which was previously used to develop the Ongakukan product "Touch the Music by Casiopea", which synchronized video with audio. This particular game was based on music from the jazz fusion band Casiopea, whose keyboard player at the time, Minoru Mukaiya, was, and is, also the CEO of Ongakukan. With Train Simulator Ongakukan filmed video from the cab of a train on the desired railway and recorded sounds from that train. Later when the simulation had been completed and was running on a PC, the video would be displayed in a silver metallic box and the sounds would be played according to what was happening at that particular moment in the simulation. The video for the original Train Simulator series of games was 308×156 pixels at 30 frames per second using Intel Indeo 2 video compression and AVI file container.

Each game contains Japanese lines and trains, with the exception of four games featuring overseas routes, in Germany, France, Taiwan, and the United States of America. Video shot from the cab of the train synchronized with the computer is used as a basis for simulation. Ongakukan have endeavoured to produce true to life simulation with much technical details, and since 2005, Ongakukan has started producing professional simulators for driver training.

== Versions ==
Six distinct series of the game have been produced through a decade:

=== Train Simulator (1995–2000) ===
The original series, starting in 1995, these titles were all released on Windows and Macintosh systems.

- 1995.08.19: Train Simulator Chūō Line 201 Series

(Nakano - Toyoda)

- 1995.09.21: Train Simulator Tōkaidō Main Line 211 Series

(Kamonomiya - Totsuka)

- 1995.09.21: Train Simulator Tōhoku Main Line 211 Series

(Toro - Mamada)

- 1996.07.19: Train Simulator Odakyu Electric Railway Odawara Line 5000 Series

(Chitose Funabashi - Sagami Ono)

- 1996.11.21: Train Simulator Sagami Railway Main Line 9000 Series

(Yokohama - Ebina)

- 1997.03.21: Train Simulator Deutsche Bahn West Rhine Railway

(Bingen - Koblenz)

- 1997.05.16: Train Simulator Nanbu Jukan Railway (Also released as a Collector's Edition)

(Shichinohe - Noheji)

- 1997.06.18: Train Simulator Keihin Kyuko Railway Main Line, Kurihama Line

(Shinagawa - Misakiguchi)

- 1997.09.19: Train Simulator JR Shikoku 1

(Takamatsu - Kotohira, Takamatsu - Kojima)

- 1997.12.17: Train Simulator Seibu Railway Shinjuku Line

(Seibu Shinjuku - Honkawagoe)

- 1998.04.17: Train Simulator Nagoya Railroad 1

Nagoya Main Line, Inuyama Line (Kanayama - Shin-Unuma), Hiromi Line (Inuyama - Shin-Kani)

- 1998.07.17: Train Simulator Hanshin Electric Railway

(Umeda - Kosoku Kobe)

- 1998.09.18: Train Simulator JR Hokkaidō 1

(Yoichi - Sapporo)

- 1998.12.18: Train Simulator JR East Yamanote Line Inner Loop (also released as Train Simulator DVD 1999.12.17)

(Osaki - Osaki, anti-clockwise)

- 1999.07.07: Train Simulator South France (also released as Train Simulator DVD)

(Cannes - Nice - Monte Carlo - Menton)

- 1999.09.17: Train Simulator Kintetsu Minami Osaka Line & Yoshino Line

(Abenobashi - Yoshino)

- 2000.03.17: Train Simulator JR East Keihin-Tohoku Line

(Kamata - Omiya)

=== Train Simulator PLUS (2000–2001) ===
The Train Simulator PLUS series was designed for the Windows system and its releases were limited to Japan. The first episodes were published by Pony Canyon while the last one was published by Ongakukan.

- 2000.07.19: Train Simulator PLUS: Keihan Electric Railway

(Yodoyabashi-Demachi Yanage)

- 2000.10.18: Train Simulator PLUS: JR East Chūō Line 2

(Tokyo-Otsuki)

- 2001.02.21: Train Simulator PLUS: Odakyu Electric Railway Odawara Line 2

(Shinjuku - Odawara)

- 2001.12.31: Train Simulator PLUS: Kyoto Municipal Subway Karasuma Line & Kintetsu Kyoto Line

(Kokusai Kaikan, Takeda, Kintetsu Nara)

=== Train Simulator Real (2001–2002) ===
Published by SCE for the PlayStation 2.

- 2001.10.4: THE Yamanote Line - Train Simulator Real

(Osaki - Osaki, clockwise)

- 2002.10.31: THE Keihin Express - Train Simulator Real

(Misakiguchi-Shinagawa, Haneda Airport-Keikyu Kamata, Shinagawa)

=== Train Simulator (2003–2005) ===
Released on PlayStation 2 system.

- 2003.10.30: Train Simulator: Midosuji Line

Osaka Subway (Nakamozu - Senri Chūō)

- 2003.12.18: Train Simulator + Densha de GO!: Tokyo Express Edition

(Sakuragicho - Shibuya, Shibuya - Chūō Rinkan, Oimachi - Futako Tamagawa)

- 2004.05.31: Train Simulator: Kyūshū Shinkansen

JR Kyūshū (Shin-Yatsushiro - Kagoshima Chūō, Kumamoto - Minamata, Kumamoto - Shin-Yatsushiro)

- 2005.08.25: Train Simulator: Keisei, Toei Asakusa, Keikyu Lines

(Haneda Airport or Ueno - Aoto - Narita Airport)

=== Mobile Train Simulator (2005–2006) ===
Released on PlayStation Portable system from 2005 to 2006 and available in Japan and Asia (Hong Kong, Taiwan, Singapore).

- 2005.02.17: Mobile Train Simulator + Densha de GO!: Tokyo Express Edition

(Sakuragicho-Shibuya, Shibuya-Chūō Rinkan, Oimachi-Futako Tamagawa)

- 2006.02.23: Mobile Train Simulator: Keisei, Toei Asakusa, Keikyu Lines

(Haneda Airport-Aoto, Ueno-Narita Airport)

=== Railfan (2006–2007) ===
Railfan is a subseries of Train Simulator designed for the PlayStation 3 system. The first game introduced in December 2006 was published by Ongakukan in Japan, by Sony Computer Entertainment in Asia (Hong Kong, Taiwan and Singapore) and by Cyberfront Korea in South Korea.

- 2006.12.21: Railfan: Chicago Transit Authority Brown Line

Chuo Main Line (Mitaka-Tokyo), Keihan Main Line (Demachiyanagi-Yodoyabashi), Chicago Brown Line (Fullerton, Loop, Fullerton)

- 2007.11.1: Railfan Taiwan Koutetsu was released in Japan late 2007 for PlayStation 3, published by Ongakukan. The game simulates the early Taiwan High Speed Rail, from Taipei to Zuoying. The game provides a simulation of a train moving at 300 km/h and details of 300 locations.

=== JR East Train Simulator (2022–present) ===
First version released in November 2022, JR East Train Simulator was the first title in the series to be regularly updated in the West. The base game features full Keihin–Tōhoku Negishi Line, short segments of the Tōkaidō, Chūō, and Ōito lines, with 12 DLC [Tōkaidō, Chūō, Ōito, Saikyō–Kawagoe, Senseki, Keiyō, Yamanote, Jōban (Ueno–Tokyo included), Shin'etsu Main, Hachinohe, Nambu (Branch included), Tsurumi (Umi-Shibaura Branch, Ōkawa Branch included), and Sōbu (Narita Airport branch included) lines] available on Steam platform to extend these lines to their full length.

== Controllers ==
A number of external controllers with realistic controls have been manufactured for use with the games:

- Train Mascon (uses serial port to connect to PC or Macintosh)
- Master Controller II for Trainsimulator (USB)
- Multi Train Controller (PlayStation 2)
