= Kuse temple ruins =

- 久世廃寺跡 (Japanese)
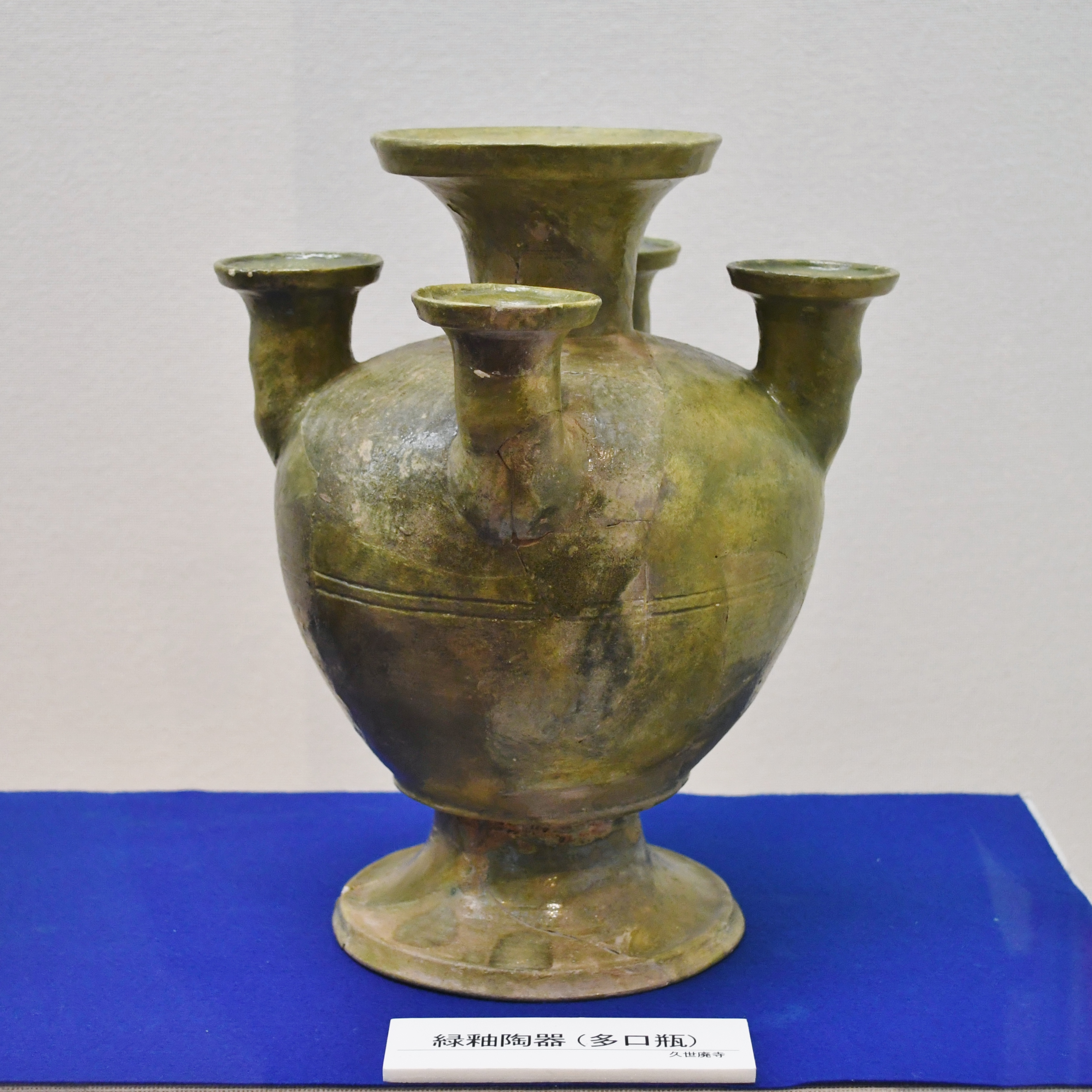
- A pottery found in the temple

- Kuse temple ruins Kuse temple ruins (Japan)
- Interactive map of Kuse temple ruins
- 34°51′35″N 135°46′48″E
- Type: temple ruins
- Periods: Nara period
- Location: Jōyō, Kyoto, Japan
- Region: Kinai region

History
- Built: 7th century AD

Site notes
- Public access: Yes (no facilities)

Kuse temple ruins (久世廃寺跡, Kuse haiji ato) is an archaeological site with the ruins of a Nara period Buddhist temple located in the Kuzeshigahara neighborhood of the city of Jōyō, Kyoto, Japan. It was designated as a National Historic Site in 2007.

== Overview ==
The Kuse temple ruins are located at the southwest end of Shibagahara Hills, on the east bank of the Kizu River in southern Yamashiro. The ruins consist of the foundations of a temple with layout patterned after Hokki-ji in Ikaruga, Nara, with a Main Hall, Pagoda and Lecture Hall. The foundations of the corridor and middle gate have not been confirmed due to ground disturbance. The remains of a roof tile kiln have been found to the east of the current Kuze Shrine building. The temple was built in the early Nara period and was destroyed in the first half of the 11th century; however, it does not appear in any historical records, and the name and history of the temple are completely unknown.

The temple grounds are estimated to have extended for 120 meters east-to-west by 135 meters north-to-south. The pagoda foundation was 13.7 by 13.4 meters, corresponding to a three-story pagoda. The Main Hall foundations were 26.7 x 21.3 meters, and the Lecture Hall foundations were 23.5 x 13 meters). The base ( 4.3 x 8 meters) of the South Gate has also been confirmed. Only the base of the southern and eastern sides of the earthen palisades surrounding the temple complex have been found. The eaves tiles from the late Nara period were identical to tiles found at the Heijō-kyō, Kuni-kyō and Yakushi-ji sites in Nara, indicating that this temple had a connection with the central government and large government-sponsored temples.

One of the buildings had a unique four-sided eave structure. Additionally, a large amount of roof tiles and iron nails from the Heian period have been excavated from the hinterland of the precincts, along with a number of important artifacts including a gilt-bronze standing statue of the Buddha at Birth from the late Nara period. Other items found include inkstones, pottery, and coins. The ruins appear to overlap the site of the ancient Kuse Gunga, the administrative complex for ancient Kuse District, Kyoto during the Nara and Heian period.

In the late Nara period after the establishment of a centralized government under the Ritsuryō system, local rule over the provinces was standardized under a kokufu (provincial capital), and each province was divided into smaller administrative districts, known as (郡, gun, kōri), composed of 2–20 townships in 715 AD. Each of the units had an administrative complex, or kanga (官衙) or gunga (郡衙) built on a semi-standardized layout based on contemporary Chinese design. The head of these local administrative establishment were typically selected from powerful local clans.

Furthermore, to the north of the ruins of the Lecture Hall, a number of late Kofun period enpun (円墳)-style round burial mounds have been found. These form the Shibagahara Kofun Cluster, and consist of seven surviving tumuli dating from around the 6th century. On the east side of the temple ruins is now Kuze Shrine, a Shinto shrine. The site is about a five minutes walk from Jōyō Station on the JR West Nara Line.

== See also ==
- List of Historic Sites of Japan (Kyoto)
