= Shinden Station (Kyoto) =

Railway station in Uji, Kyoto Prefecture, Japan

Shinden Station 新田駅
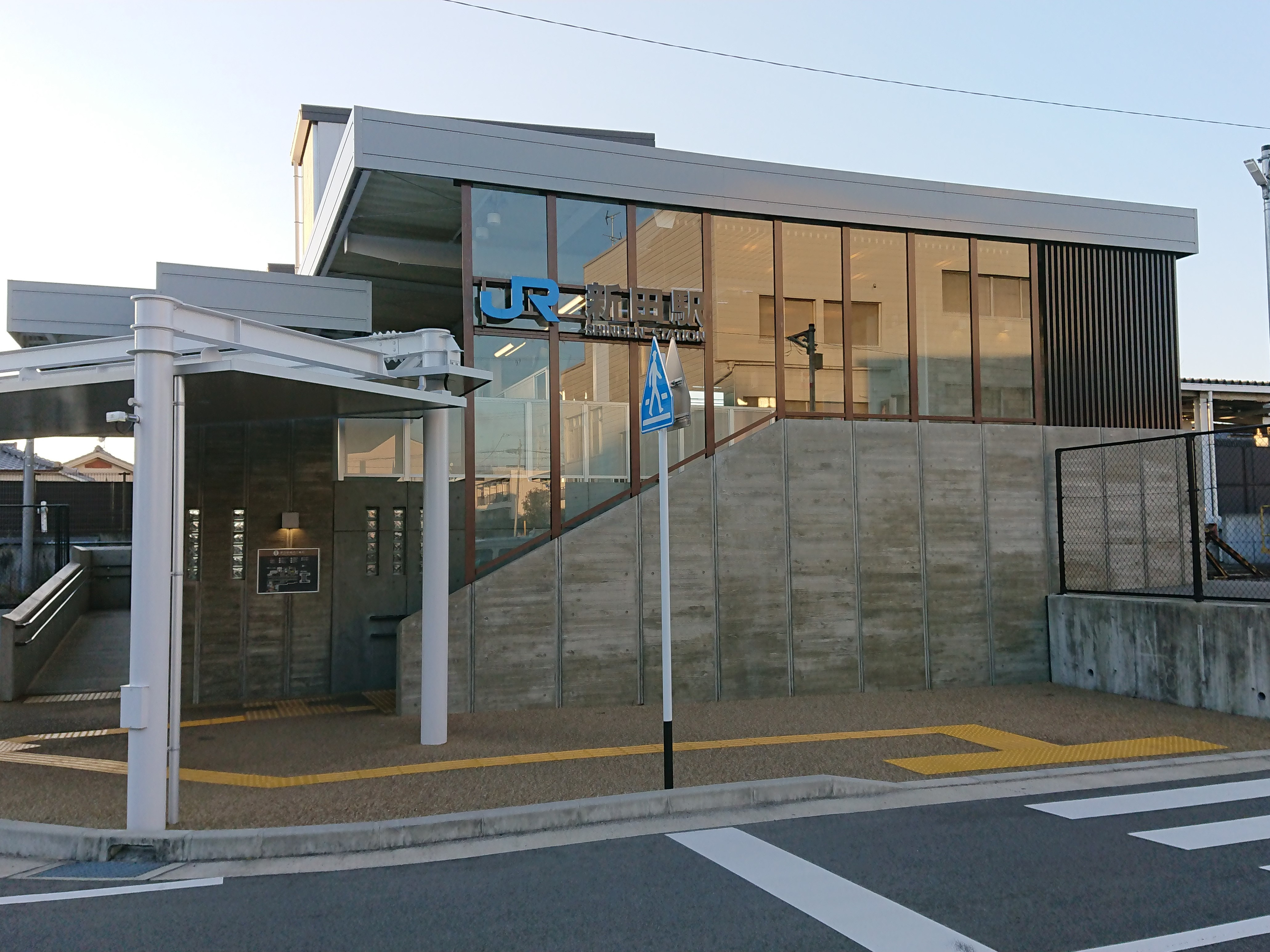
- East entrance of the Shinden Station in 2021

General information
- Location: Uji, Kyoto Prefecture; Japan
- Coordinates: 34°52′27″N 135°46′50″E
- Operator: JR West
- Line: D Nara Line
- Platforms: 2 side platforms
- Tracks: 2

Construction
- Structure type: Ground level
- Accessible: Yes

Other information
- Station code: JR-D11
- Website: Official website

History
- Opened: 25 January 1896

Passengers
- FY 2023: 6,694 daily
Location
- Location within Kyoto Prefecture Location within Japan

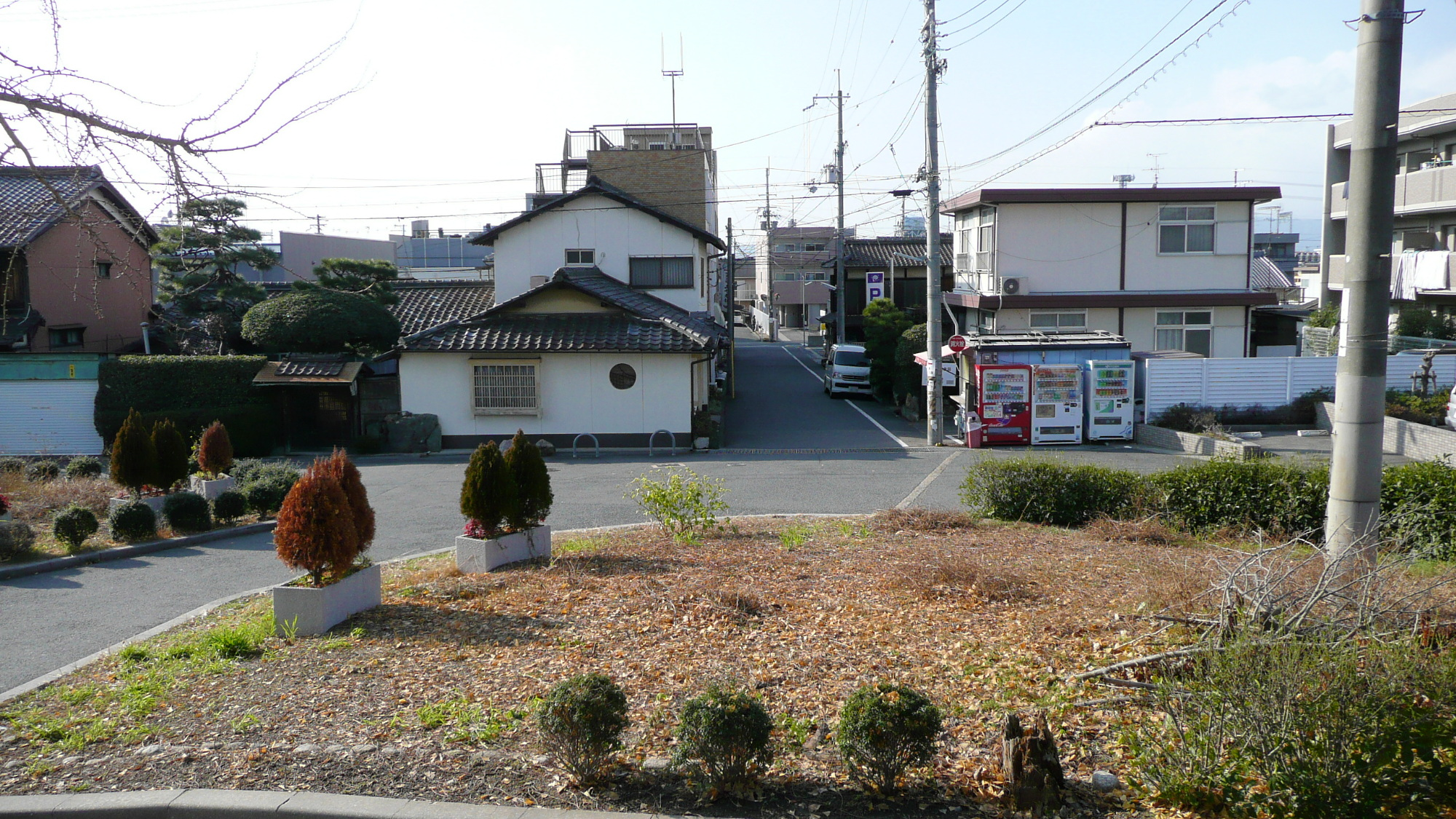
Town in front of the station (from the station building)

Shinden Station (新田駅, Shinden-eki) is a train station in Uji, Kyoto Prefecture, Japan, operated by West Japan Railway Company (JR West). It has the station number "JR-D11".

== Lines ==
Shinden Station is served by the Nara Line.

== Layout ==
The station consists of two side platforms serving two tracks. The station building is on platform 1. There is an overpass between the two platforms. The station does not have a Midori no Madoguchi ticket window, but a POS terminal. From this station, the Nara Line has double tracks in direction for Kyoto, and a single track in direction for Nara.

=== Platforms ===
1	■ Nara Line	for Uji and Kyoto
2	■ Nara Line	for Kizu and Nara

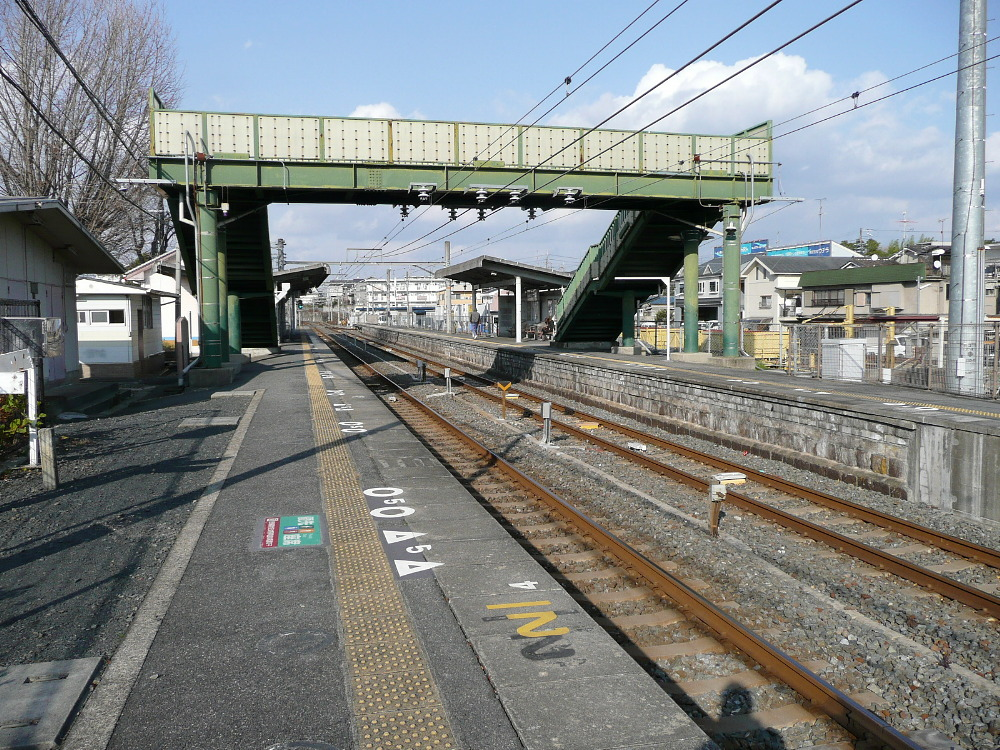
Platforms (before an elevator was built)

== Passenger statistics ==
According to the Kyoto Prefecture statistical report, the average number of passengers per day is as follows.

Year	Passengers
2000	1,934
2001	1,923
2002	2,277
2003	2,397
2004	2,507
2005	2,551
2006	2,655
2007	2,734
2008	2,725
2009	2,701
2010	2,836
2011	2,954
2012	2,963
2013	3,036
2014	2,984
2015	3,036
2016	3,058

== History ==
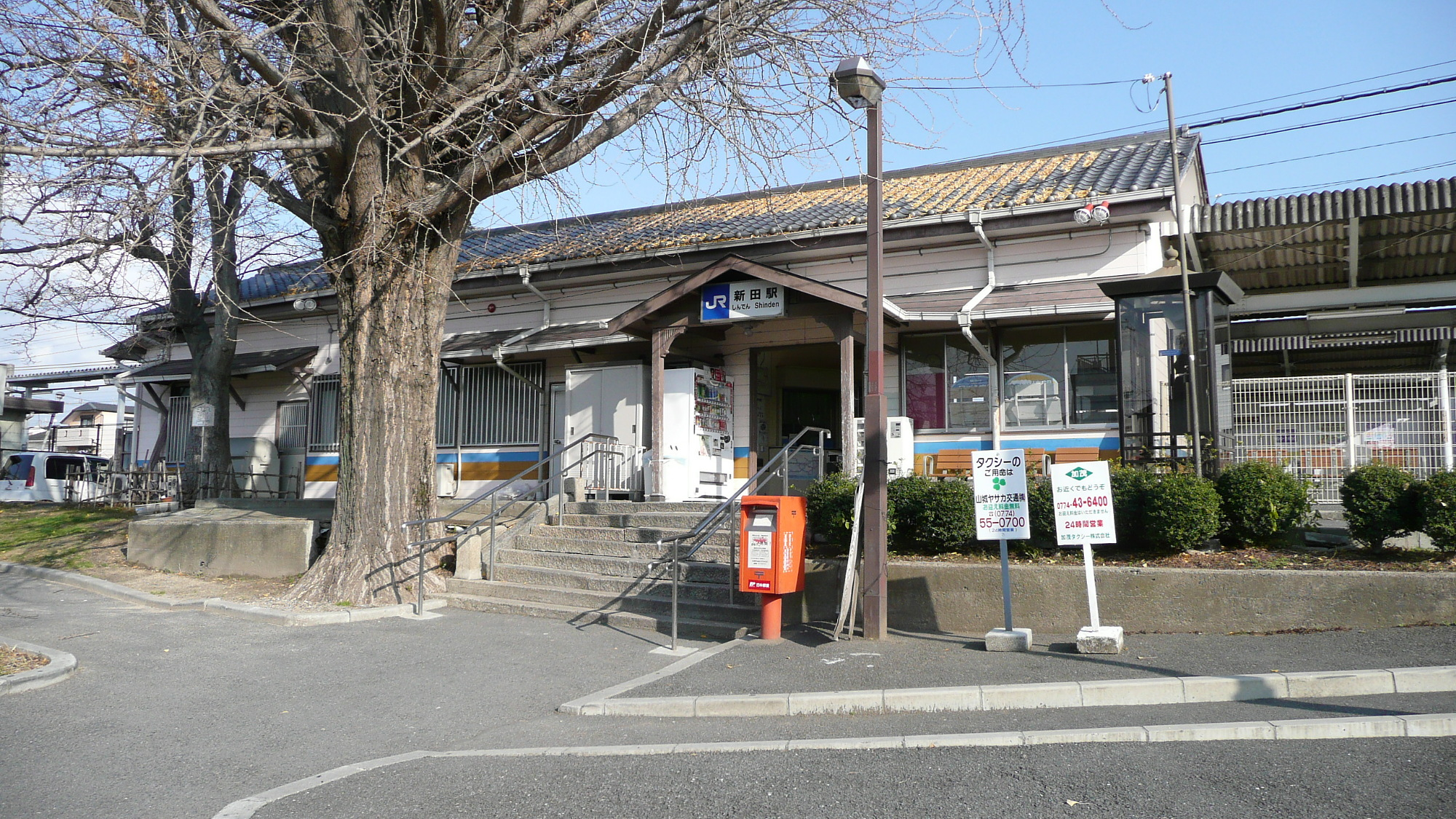
Shinden Station in 2008

The station opened on January 25, 1896. The Kansai Railway was nationalised on October 1, 1907. After the privatization of Japanese National Railways (JNR) on April 1, 1987, the station came under the control of JR West. The IC card ticket "ICOCA" can be used since 1 November 2003. Station numbering was introduced in March 2018 with Shinden being assigned station number JR-D11.

== Adjacent stations ==
«	Service	»
Nara Line
Miyakoji Rapid Service: Does not stop at this station
JR Ogura	Rapid Service	Jōyō
JR Ogura	Regional Rapid Service	Jōyō
JR Ogura	Local	Jōyō

== Surrounding area ==
- Okubo Station on the Kintetsu Kyoto Line
