= Nagaike Station =

Railway station in Jōyō, Kyoto Prefecture, Japan

Nagaike Station 長池駅
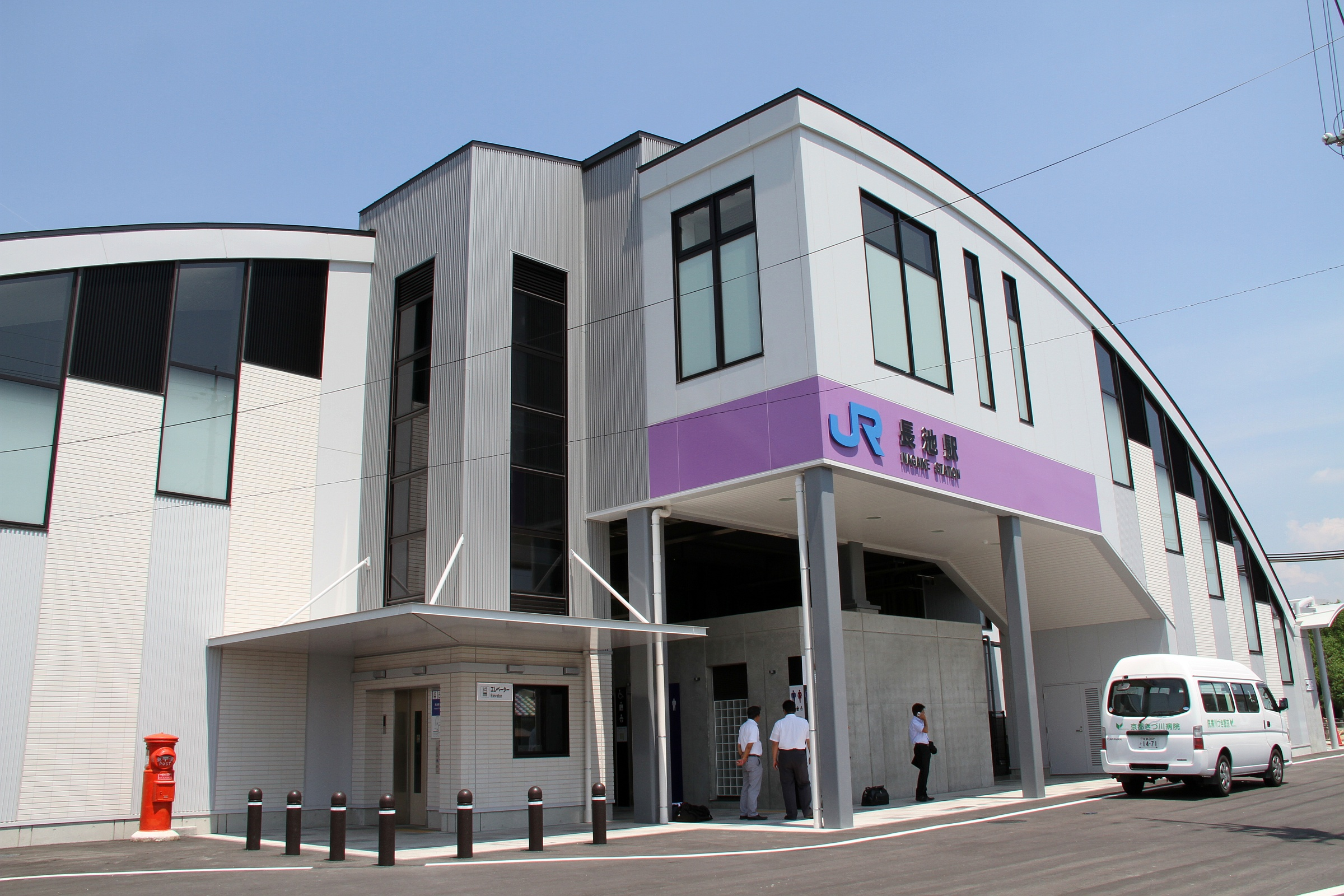
- Nagaike Station in January 2012

General information
- Location: 72 Kitaura Nagaike, Jōyō-shi, Kyoto-fu 610-0112; Japan
- Coordinates: 34.8424°N 135.7900°E
- Operator: JR West
- Line: D Nara Line
- Distance: 12.7 km (7.9 miles) from Kizu
- Platforms: 2 side platforms
- Tracks: 2

Construction
- Structure type: Ground level
- Accessible: None

Other information
- Status: Staffed
- Station code: JR-D13
- Website: Official website

History
- Opened: 25 January 1896

Passengers
- FY 2023: 2,370 daily

Services
Preceding station	JR West	Following station
Jōyō towards Kyoto	Nara Line	Yamashiro-Aodani towards Nara
Location
- Location within Kyoto Prefecture Location within Japan

Nagaike Station (長池駅, Nagaike-eki) is passenger railway station located in the city of Jōyō, Kyoto Prefecture, Japan, operated by West Japan Railway Company (JR West). It has the station number "JR-D13".

== Lines ==
Nagaike Station is served by the Nara Line and is located 12.7 km (7.9 mi) from the terminus of the line at Kizu. and 19.7 km (12.2 mi) from Nara.

== Layout ==
The station consists of two side platforms connected by an elevated station buildinglocated above the tracks. The concourse serves as a free passage connecting the north and south of the station since 27 May 2012, together with the building and spaces used by local residents. The IC card ticket "ICOCA" can be used at this station. The station is staffed.

=== Platforms ===
1	■ D Nara Line	for Uji and Kyoto
2	■ D Nara Line	for Nara

== History ==
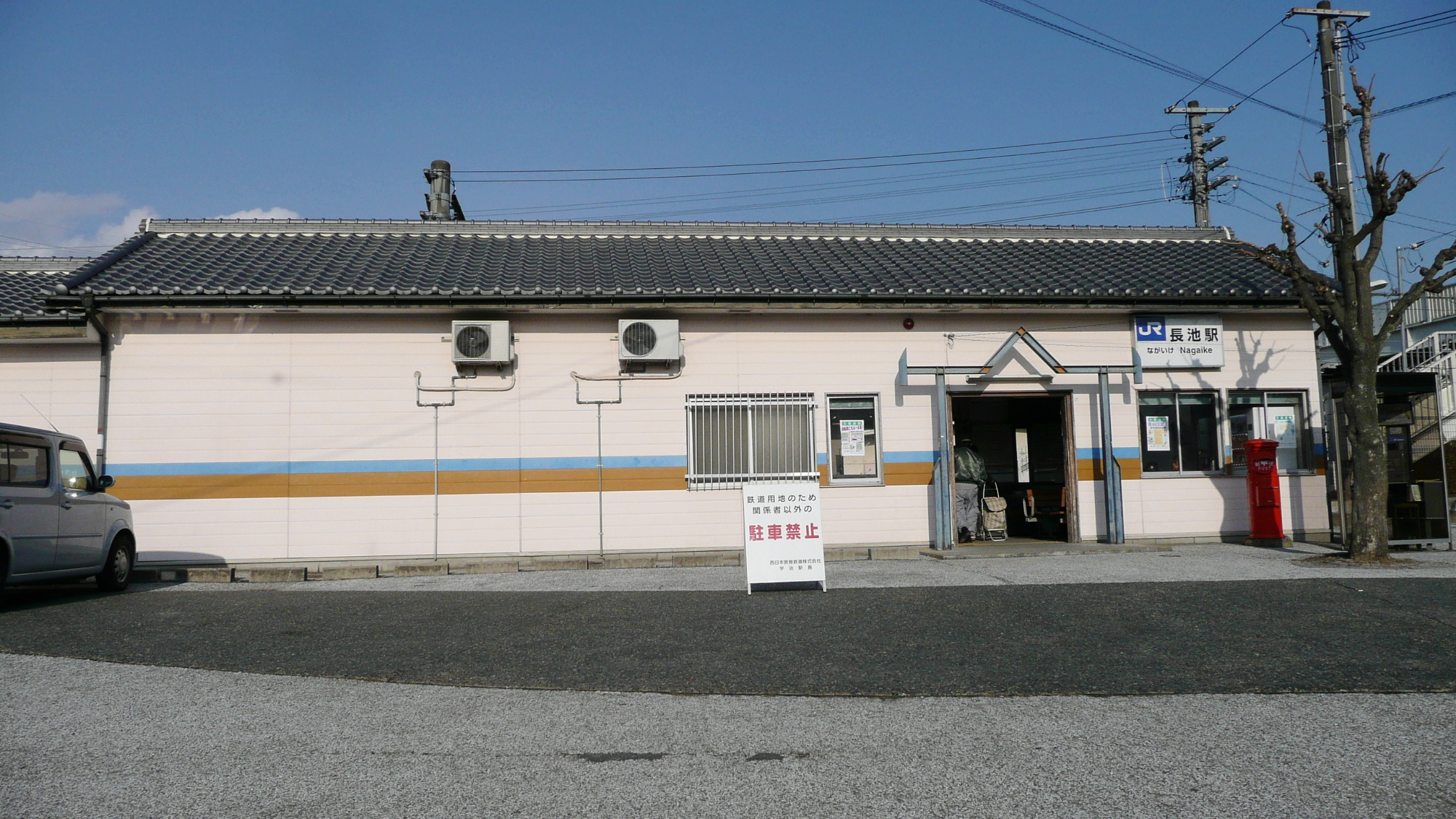
Nagaike Station in 2008

Nagaike Station was opened on 25 January 1896 as a station on the Nara Railway. The Nara Railway merged with the Kansai Railway in 1905 and was nationalized in 1907. With the privatization of Japanese National Railways (JNR) on 1 April 1987, the station came under the control of JR West. Station numbering was introduced in March 2018 with Nagaike being assigned station number JR-D13.

== Passenger statistics ==
According to the Kyoto Prefecture statistical report, the average number of passengers per day is as follows.

Year	Passengers
1999	1,181
2000	1,110
2001	1,137
2002	1,118
2003	1,129
2004	1,186
2005	1,222
2006	1,249
2007	1,246
2008	1,184
2009	1,129
2010	1,121
2011	1,082
2012	1,265
2013	1,219
2014	1,214
2015	1,243
2016	1,230
2017	1,230
2018	1,197
2019	1,210

== Surrounding area ==
On the south side is a traditional residential area that originated as the Nagaike-juku post town that developed along the Yamato Kaido in the Edo period, and on the north side are new housing developments that were built from the 1960s to the early 1950s.

== See also ==
- List of railway stations in Japan
