= Yamashiro-Aodani Station =

Railway station in Jōyō, Kyoto Prefecture, Japan

Yamashiro-Aodani Station 山城青谷駅
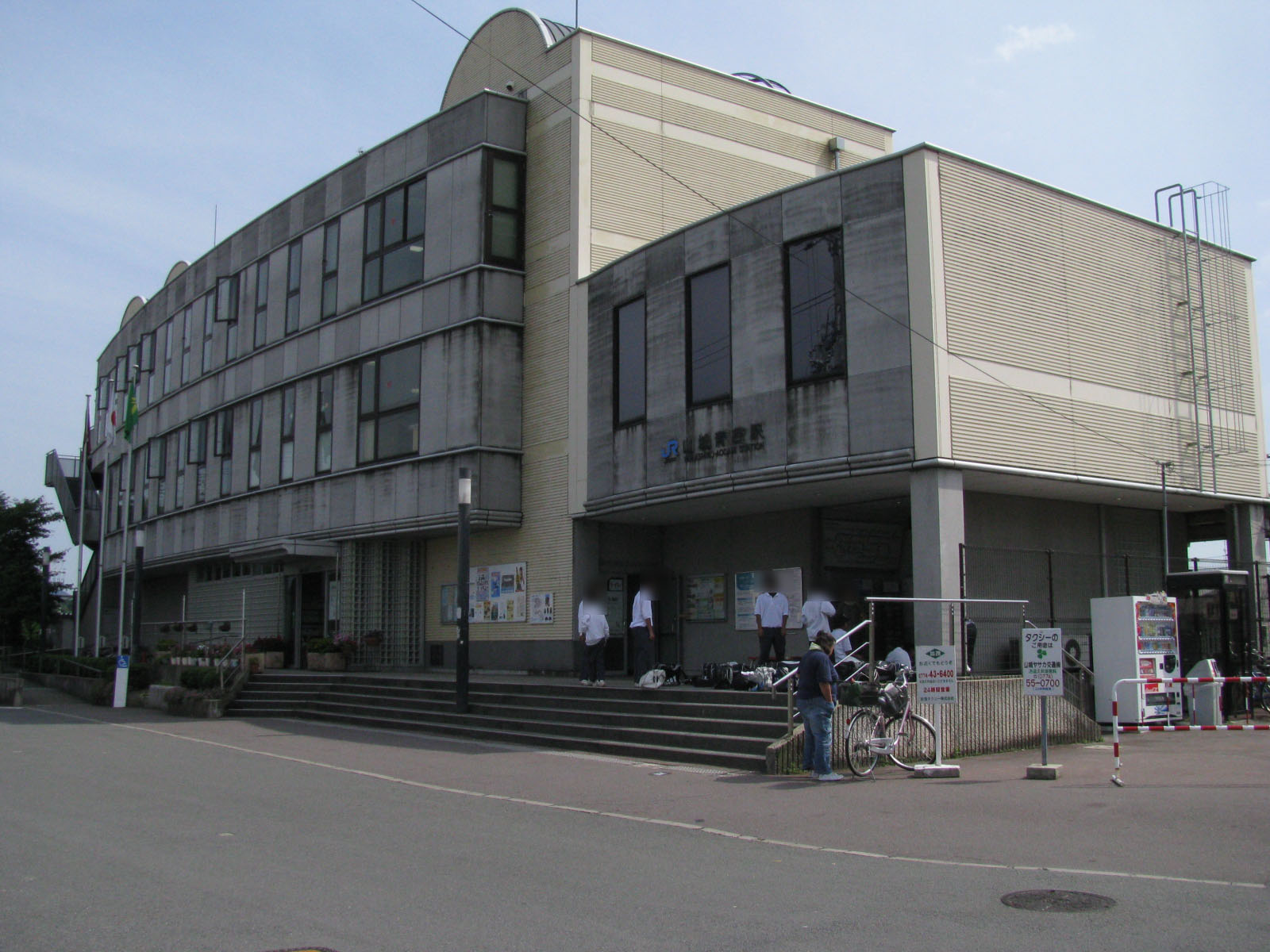
- Yamashiro-Aodani Station in July 2008

General information
- Location: 58, Ichinobe Gotō, Jōyō-shi, Kyoto-fu 610-0114; Japan
- Coordinates: 34°49′42″N 135°48′00″E
- Operator: JR West
- Line: D Nara Line
- Distance: 10.7 km (6.6 miles) from Kizu
- Platforms: 2 side platforms
- Tracks: 2

Construction
- Structure type: Elevated
- Accessible: Yes

Other information
- Status: Staffed
- Station code: JR-D14
- Website: Official website

History
- Opened: 13 February 1926

Passengers
- FY 2023: 1,724 daily

Services
Preceding station	JR West	Following station
Nagaike towards Kyoto	Nara Line	Yamashiro-Taga towards Nara
Location
- Location within Kyoto Prefecture Location within Japan

Yamashiro-Aodani Station (山城青谷駅, Yamashiro-Aodani-eki) is a passenger railway station located in the city of Jōyō, Kyoto Prefecture, Japan, operated by West Japan Railway Company (JR West).

== Lines ==
Yamashiro-Aodani Station is served by the Nara Line and is located at 10.7 km (6.6 miles) from the terminus of the line at Kizu and 17.7 kilometers from Nara.

== Layout ==
The station consists of two side platforms connected by an elevated station building which also serves ass a local community center. The station has a POS terminal. The IC card ticket "ICOCA" can be used at this station. The station is staffed.

=== Platforms ===
1	■ D Nara Line	for Uji and Kyoto
2	■ D Nara Line	for Nara

== History ==
Yamashiro-Aodani was opened as a temporary stop on 13 February 1926, and elevated to a full passenger station on 1 December 1933. With the privatization of Japanese National Railways (JNR) on 1 April 1987, the station came under the control of JR West. Station numbering was introduced in March 2018 with Yamashiro-Aodani being assigned station number JR-D14.

== Passenger statistics ==
According to the Kyoto Prefecture statistical report, the average number of passengers per day is as follows. It is the nearest station to Aotani Plum Tree, and the use increases slightly during plum blossom season.

Year	Passengers
1999	1,088
2000	1,055
2001	1,090
2002	1,014
2003	1,047
2004	1,038
2005	1,038
2006	1,019
2007	993
2008	1,027
2009	992
2010	975
2011	975
2012	986
2013	959
2014	956
2015	954
2016	959
2017	967
2018	945
2019	921

== Surrounding area ==
- Joyo City Aoya Elementary School
- Aoya Plum Gardens
- Kyoto Prefectural Joyo Technical College for the Disabled

== See also ==
- List of railway stations in Japan
