= Koma-dera =

Buddhist temple ruins in Kyoto, Japan

Koma-dera ruins
- 高麗寺跡 (Japanese)
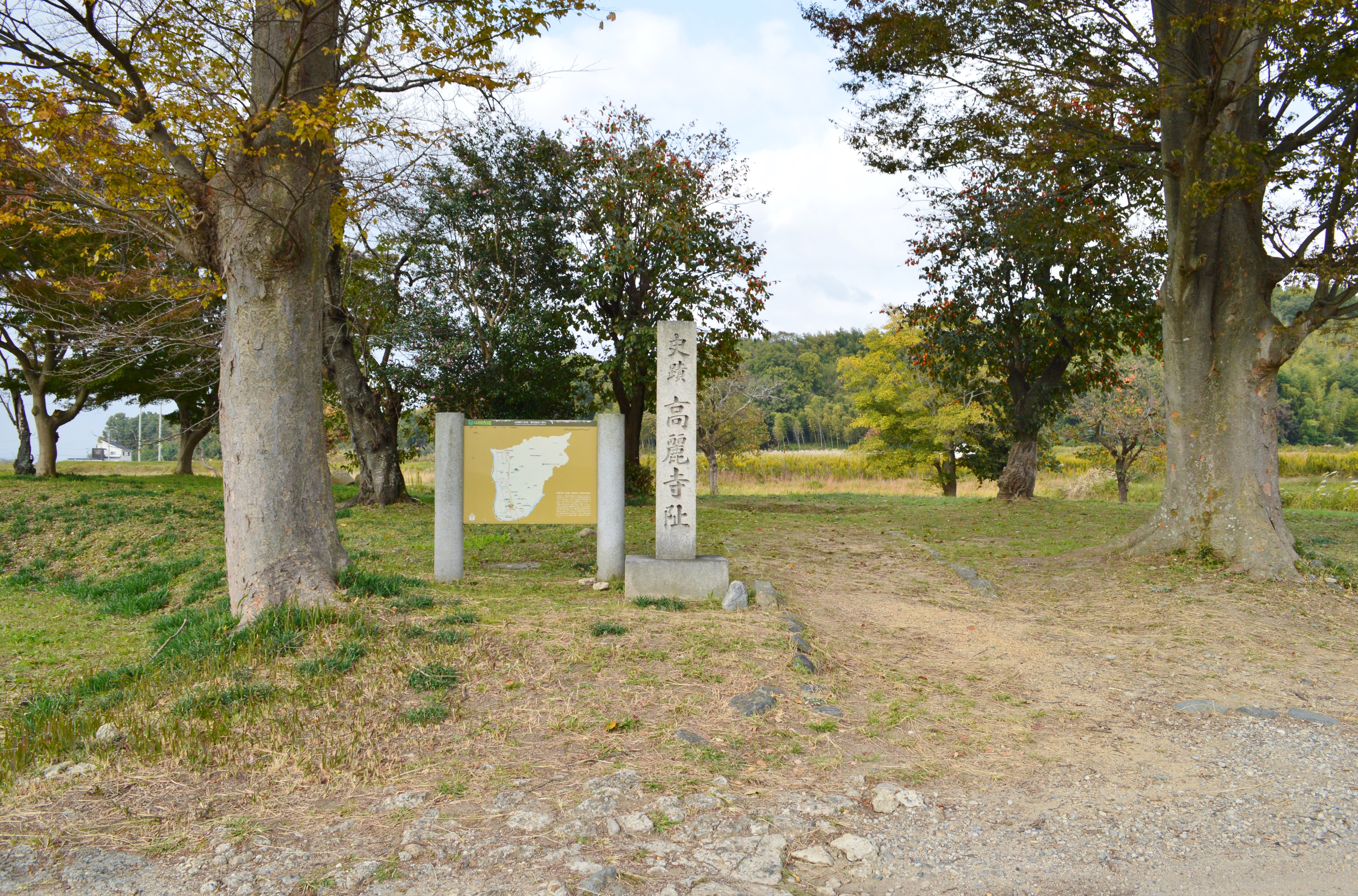
- Koma-dera ruins

- Koma-dera ruins Koma-dera (Japan)
- Interactive map of Koma-dera ruins
- 34°44′58″N 135°49′40″E
- Type: temple ruins
- Periods: Nara period
- Location: Kizugawa, Kyoto, Japan
- Region: Kinai region

History
- Built: Asuka period

Site notes
- Public access: Yes (no facilities)

Koma-dera ruins (高麗寺跡, Koma-dera ato) is an archaeological site with the ruins of a Nara period Buddhist temple located in the Yamashiro neighborhood of the city of Kizugawa, Kyoto, Japan. It was designated as a National Historic Site in 1940 with the area under protection expanded in 2010.

== Overview ==
The Koma-dera ruins are located in the rice terraces to the east of Kamikoma on the north bank of the Kizu River. On the opposite bank was Izumitsu (Kozu Ruins), which was the main port for shipping on the Kizu River. Koma-dera is believed to have been the oldest temple built in former Yamashiro Province, dating from the Asuka period. It was the clan temple of the Koma clan, a toraijin clan originally from Goguryeo. The temple name appears in various ancient chronicles, including the Nihon Shoki of the Nara period, the Nihon Ryōiki of the early Heian period and the Konjaku Monogatari of the late Heian period. It is believed to have been abandoned around the end of the Heian period to the start of the Kamakura period. The foundation stones of the main buildings remained visible well into the Meiji period. Archaeological excavations starting in 1938 have found the foundations of the Pagoda in the east, Main Hall in the west, Lecture Hall and Middle Gate, and the foundations of a cloister surrounding the pagoda and Main Hall to form a square courtyard 61.9 meters east–west and about 65.6 meters north–south. The total temple enclosure was 200 Chinese shaku, or about 185 meters on each side. This is only of the earliest examples of a temple layout based on Hokki-ji in Ikaruga, Nara, rather than Kawara-dera in Asuka. However, excavated roof tiles are identical to tiles found at Asuka-dera in Asuka, which was constructed by Soga no Umako in 596 AD, and at Kawara-dera, which was built by Emperor Tenchi in the late 7th century.

During subsequent excavations, a copper metal fitting called a sakkan, which was used to attach the water pipe at the top of the pagoda's sōrin finial to the central pillar, was discovered, and its surface was plated with gold, an advanced technology at the time. In addition, a large number of molds for fūtaku (wind bells attached to the edges of a sōrin's rings) have been unearthed. The ruins are now a public park, and are located about a ten-minute walk from Kamikoma Station on the JR West Nara Line. Excavated artifacts are permanently displayed at the Prefectural Yamashiro Local Museum.

== See also ==
- List of Historic Sites of Japan (Kyoto)
