= JR Ogura Station =

Railway station in Uji, Kyoto Prefecture, Japan

JR Ogura Station JR小倉駅
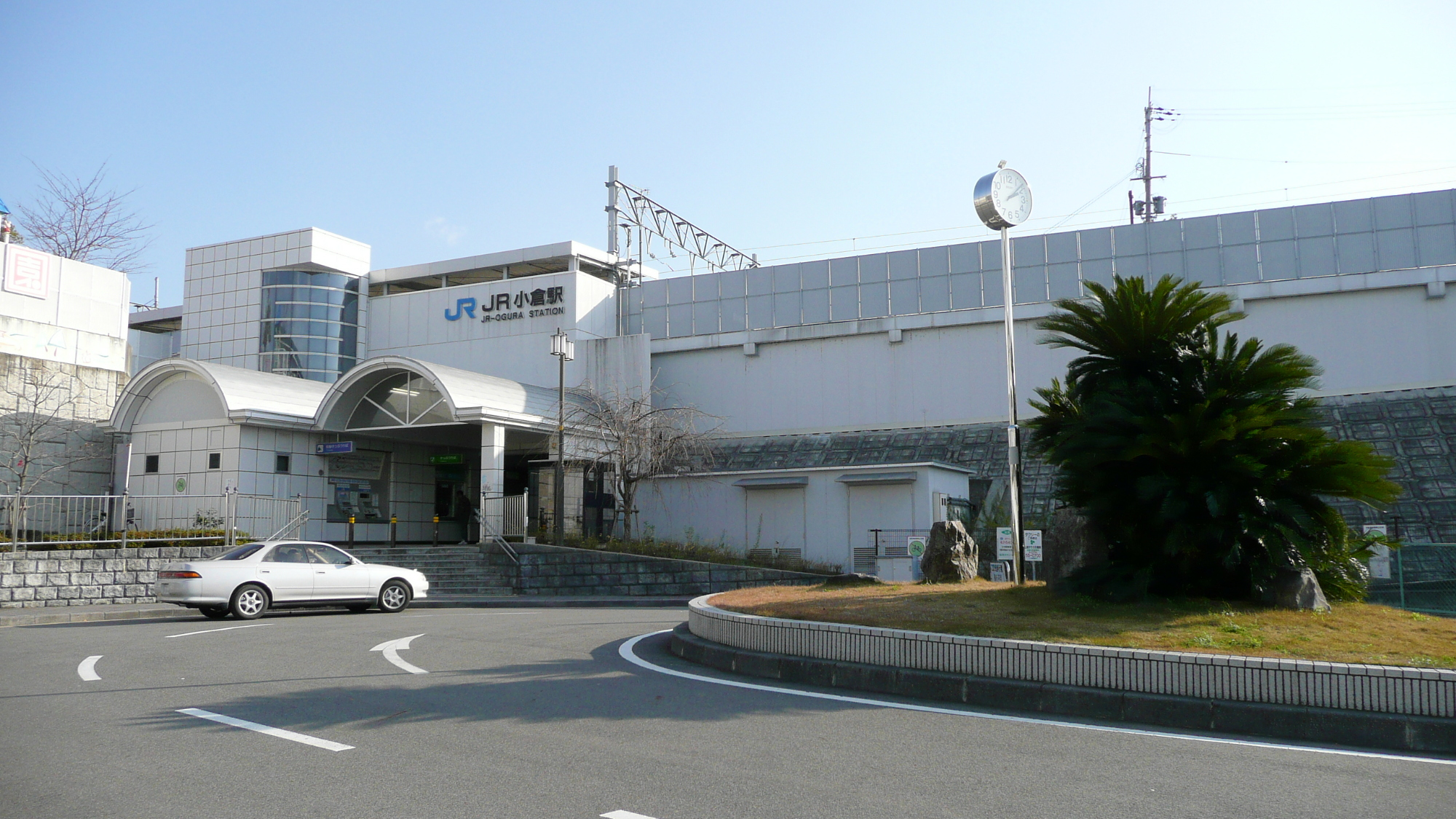
- JR Ogura Station in January 2008

General information
- Location: Uji, Kyoto Prefecture; Japan
- Coordinates: 34°53′21″N 135°47′09″E
- Operator: JR West
- Line: D Nara Line
- Platforms: 2 side platforms
- Tracks: 2

Construction
- Structure type: Elevated
- Accessible: Yes

Other information
- Station code: JR-D10
- Website: Official website

History
- Opened: 3 March 2001

Passengers
- FY 2023: 3,632 daily
Location
- Location within Kyoto Prefecture Location within Japan

JR Ogura Station (JR小倉駅, JR Ogura-eki) is a train station Uji, Kyoto Prefecture, Japan, operated by West Japan Railway Company (JR West). It is the closest station on the JR lines to the old Nintendo Uji Ogura Plant, which is the site of the Nintendo Museum.

== Lines ==
JR Ogura Station is served by the Nara Line.

== Station Layout ==
The station has two side platforms serving one track each.

=== Platforms ===
1	■ Nara Line	for Uji and Kyoto
2	■ Nara Line	for Nara

== Passenger statistics ==
According to the Kyoto Prefecture statistical report, the average number of passengers per day is as follows.

Year	Passengers
2000	1,000
2001	1,236
2002	1,427
2003	1,563
2004	1,647
2005	1,737
2006	1,778
2007	1,838
2008	1,888
2009	1,860
2010	1,893
2011	1,910
2012	1,914
2013	1,934
2014	1,910
2015	1,921
2016	1,863

== History ==
The station opened on 3 March 2001. It opened at the same time as the double track between Uji Station and Shinden Station on the Nara Line. The IC card ticket "ICOCA" can be used since 1 November 2003. Station numbering was introduced in March 2018 with JR Fujinomori being assigned station number JR-D10.

== Adjacent stations ==
«	Service	»
Nara Line
Miyakoji Rapid Service: Does not stop at this station
Uji	Rapid Service	Shinden
Uji	Regional Rapid Service	Shinden
Uji	Local	Shinden
