= Ōbaku Station =

Ōbaku Station (黄檗駅) is the name of two train stations in Japan:

- Ōbaku Station (Keihan)
- Ōbaku Station (JR West)
