= Kohata Station =

Railway station in Uji, Kyoto Prefecture, Japan

Kohata Station 木幡駅
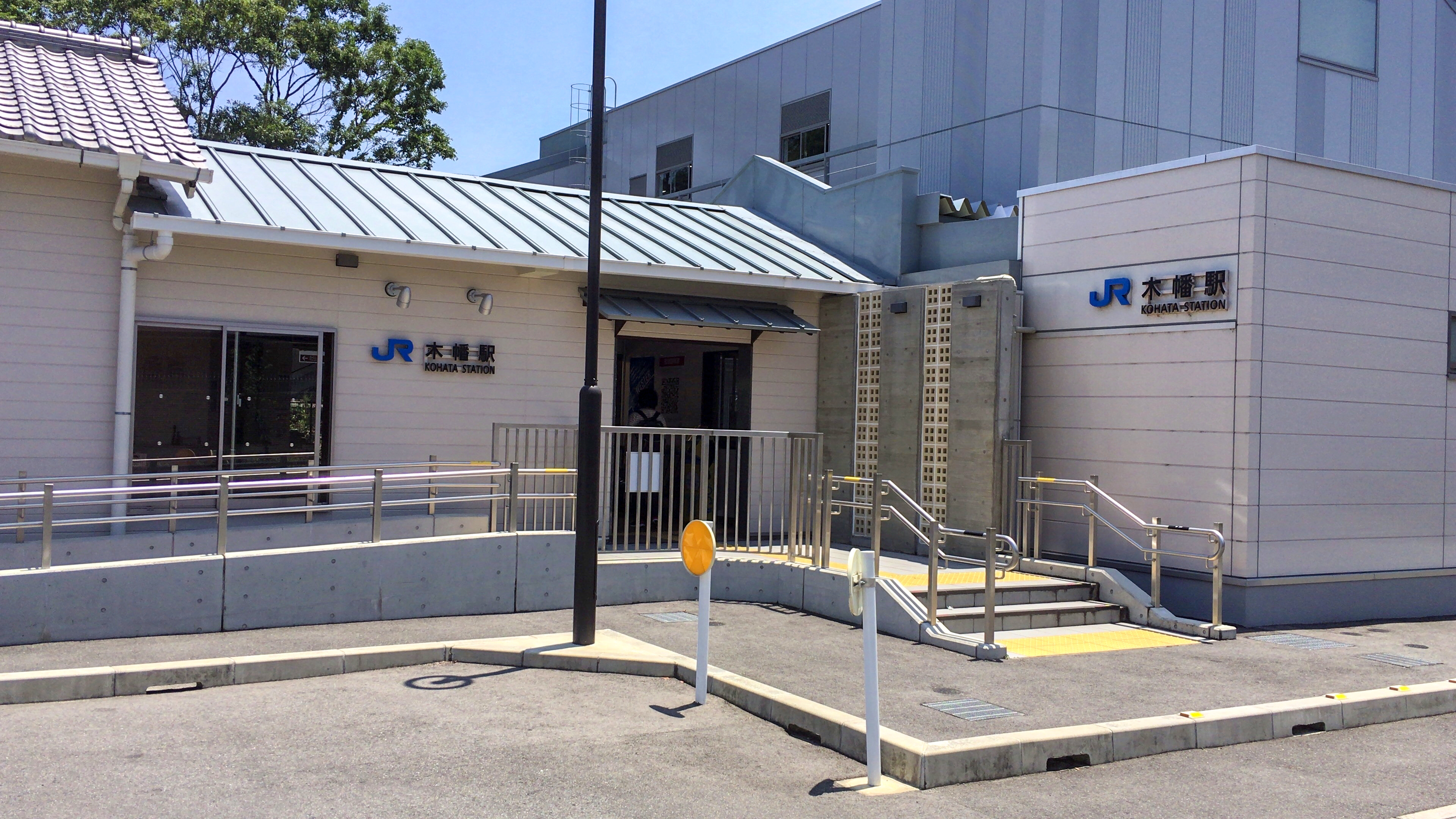
- Kohata Station building in June 2021

General information
- Location: Kohata, Uji, Kyoto; Kyoto Prefecture; Japan
- Coordinates: 34°55′30″N 135°47′56″E
- Operator: JR West
- Line: D Nara Line
- Platforms: 2 side platforms
- Tracks: 2

Construction
- Structure type: Ground level
- Accessible: Yes

Other information
- Station code: JR-D07
- Website: Official website

History
- Opened: 1896

Passengers
- FY 2023: 5,272 daily
Location
- Location within Kyoto Prefecture Location within Japan

Kohata Station (木幡駅, Kohata-eki) is a railway station located in Uji, Kyoto Prefecture, Japan, operated by West Japan Railway Company (JR West). It has the station number "JR-D07".

== Lines ==
Kohata Station is served by the Nara Line.

== Layout ==
The station has two side platforms serving one track each.

=== Platform ===
1, 2	■ Nara Line	for Kyoto for Uji and Nara

== History ==
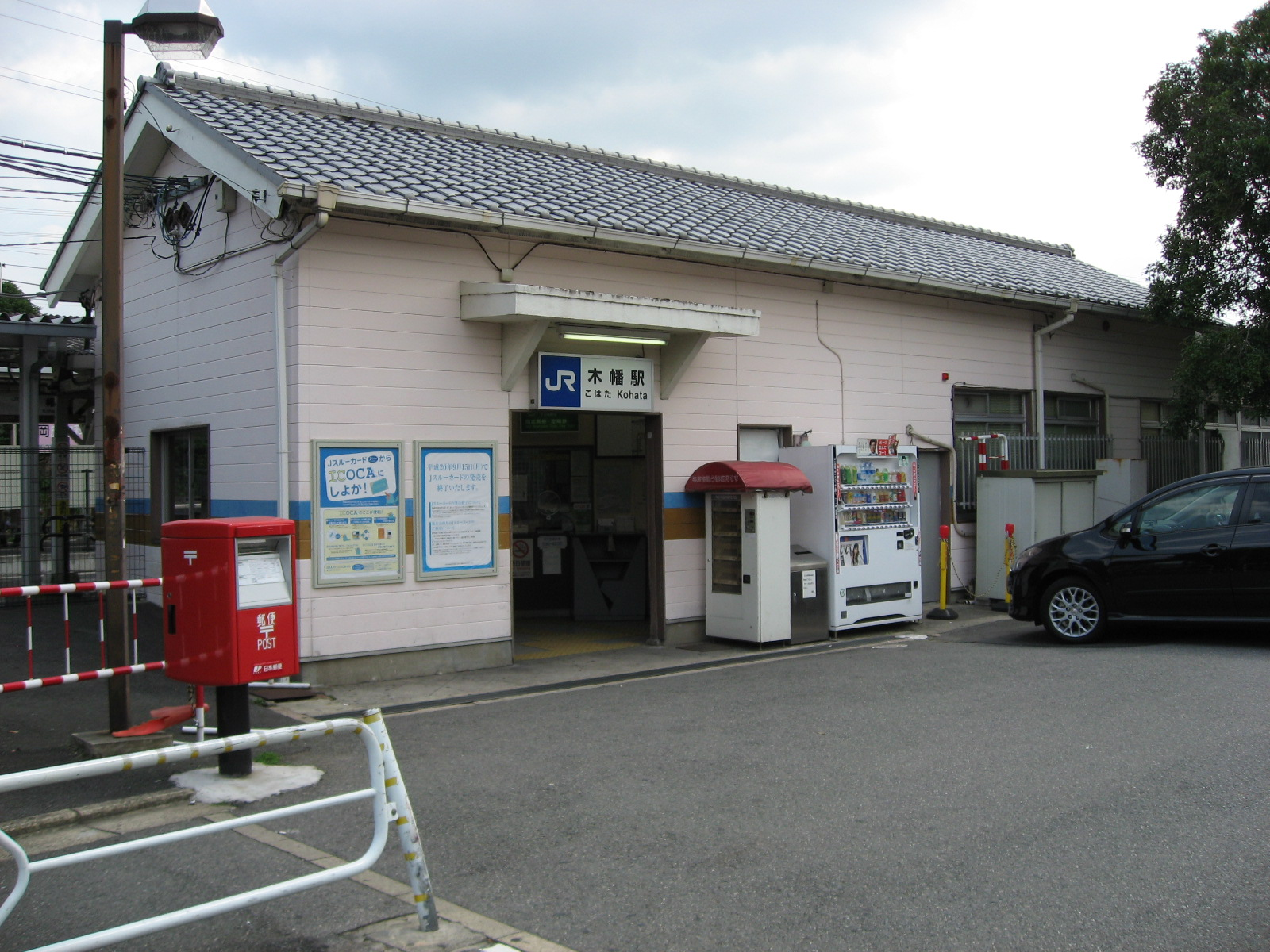
Kohata Station building in September 2008

Station numbering was introduced in March 2018 with Kohata being assigned station number JR-D07.

== Passenger statistics ==
According to the Kyoto Prefecture statistical report, the average number of passengers per day is as follows.

year	Passengers
1999	2,749
2000	2,710
2001	2,636
2002	2,595
2003	2,612
2004	2,638
2005	2,625
2006	2,685
2007	2,698
2008	2,679
2009	2,608
2010	2,738
2011	2,727
2012	2,726
2013	2,745
2014	2,762
2015	2,727
2016	2,699

== Adjacent stations ==
«	Service	»
JR West Nara Line
Rokujizō	Local	Ōbaku
Regional Rapid Service: Does not stop at this station
Rapid Service: Does not stop at this station
Miyakoji Rapid Service: Does not stop at this station

== Surrounding area ==
- Panasonic Electronic Devices Co., Ltd. (Capacitor Business Unit)
- Kohata Shrine
- Kyoto Animation (head office)
