= Tamamizu Station =

Railway station in Ide, Kyoto Prefecture, Japan

Tamamizu Station 玉水駅
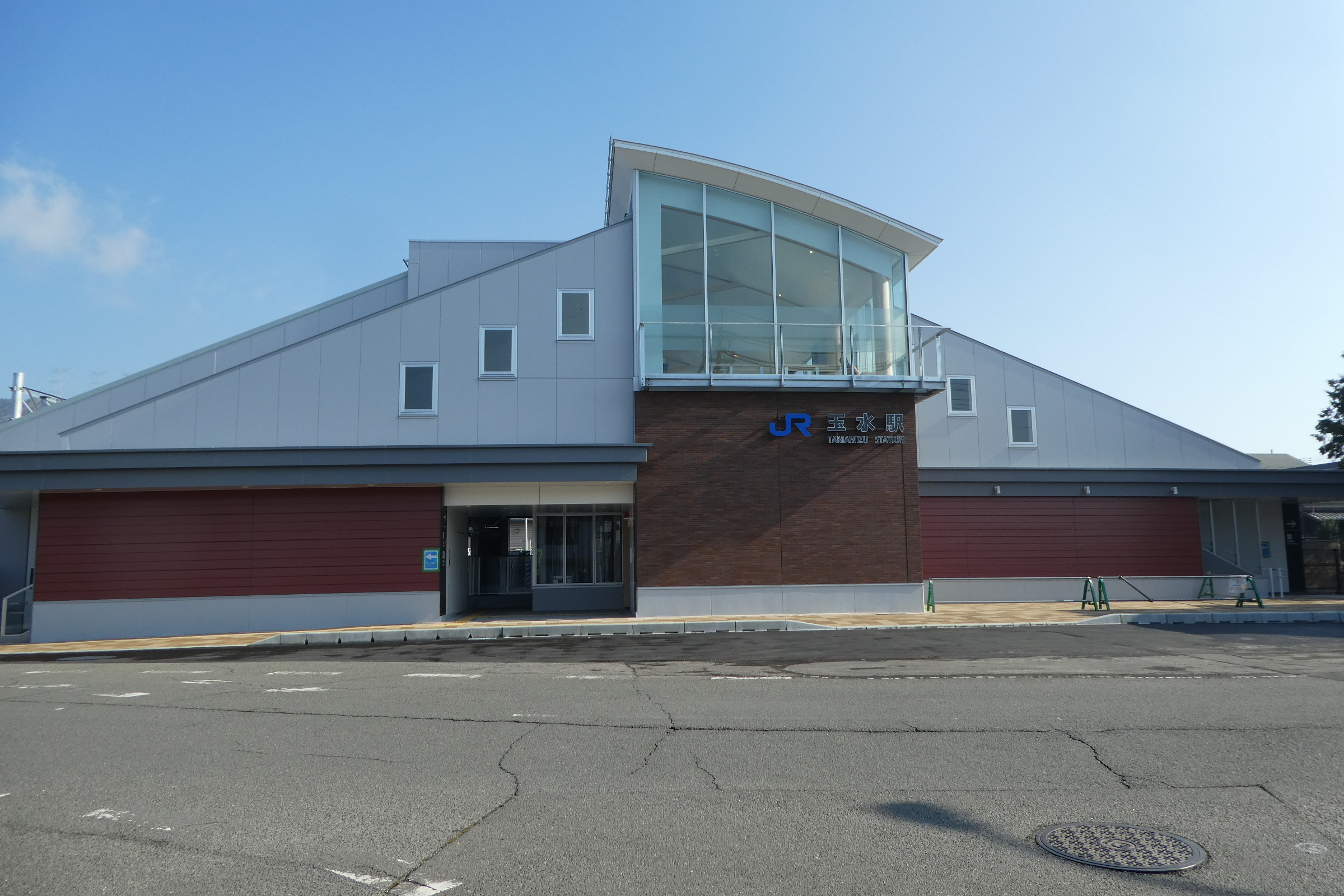
- Tamamizu Station in December 2012

General information
- Location: 21, Ōaza Ide Koaza Kitagaito, Ide-cho, Tsuzuki-gun, Kyoto-fu 610-0302; Japan
- Coordinates: 34°48′01″N 135°48′25″E
- Operator: JR West
- Line: D Nara Line
- Distance: 7.4 km (4.6 miles) from Kizu
- Platforms: 2 side platforms
- Tracks: 2

Construction
- Structure type: Elevated
- Accessible: Yes

Other information
- Station code: JR-D16
- Website: www.jr-odekake.net

History
- Opened: 25 January 1896

Passengers
- FY 2023: 1,886 daily

Services
Preceding station	JR West	Following station
Yamashiro-Taga towards Kyoto	Nara Line	Tanakura towards Nara
Location
- Location within Kyoto Prefecture Location within Japan

Tamamizu Station (玉水駅, Tamamizu-eki) is a passenger railway station located in the town of Ide, Tsuzuki District, Kyoto Prefecture, Japan, operated by West Japan Railway Company (JR West). It has the station number "JR-D16".

== Lines ==
Tamamizu Station is served by the Nara Line and is located at 7.4 km (4.6 miles) from the terminus of the line at Kizu and 14.4 kilometers from Nara.

== Layout ==
The station consists of two side platforms connected by an elevated station building. The station is staffed. A POS terminal is installed at the station. IC card tickets can be used at this station.

=== Platforms ===
1	■ D Nara Line	for Uji and Kyoto
2	■ D Nara Line	for Nara

== History ==
Tamamizu Station was opened on 25 January 1896 as a station on the Nara Railway, when the line was extended from Momoyama Station. The Nara Railway merged with the Kansai Railway in 1905 and was nationalized in 1907.With the privatization of Japanese National Railways (JNR) on 1 April 1987, the station came under the control of JR West. Station numbering was introduced in March 2018 with Tamamizu being assigned station number JR-D16.

== Passenger statistics ==
According to the Kyoto Prefecture statistics and Ide Town statistics, the average number of passengers per day is as follows.

Year	Passengers
1999	1,000
2000	962
2001	984
2002	964
2003	1,077
2004	1,110
2005	1,107
2006	1,101
2007	1,134
2008	1,107
2009	1,074
2010	1,060
2011	1,044
2012	1,075
2013	1,055
2014	1,024
2015	1,044
2016	1,047
2017	1,044
2018	984
2019	961

== Surrounding area ==
- Ide Town Hall
- Ide Municipal Ide Elementary School
- Ide Town Izumigaoka Junior High School

== See also ==
- List of railway stations in Japan
