= Tanakura Station =

Railway station in Kizugawa, Kyoto Prefecture, Japan

Tanakura Station 棚倉駅
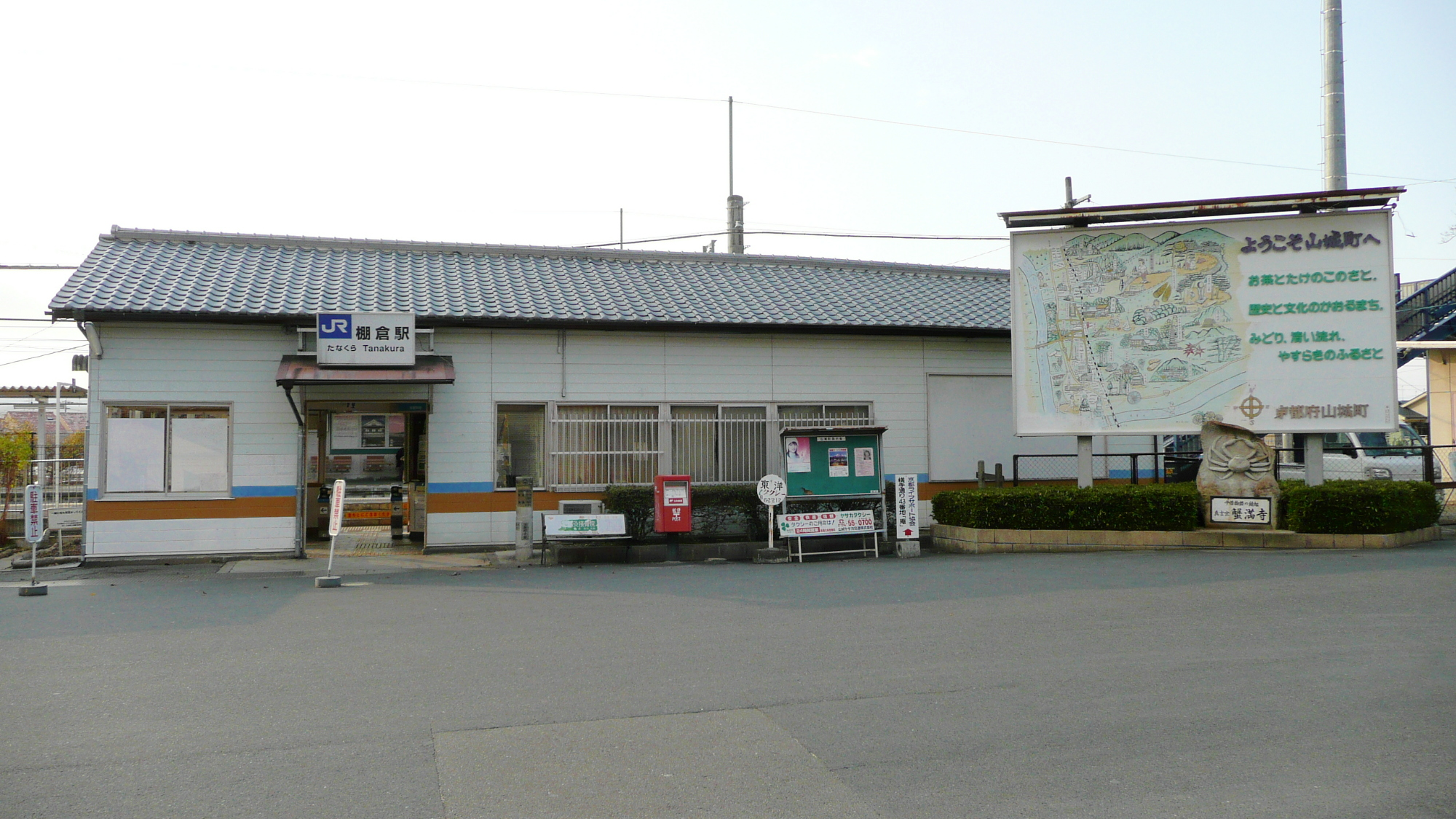
- Tanakura Station in January 2008

General information
- Location: Minamiharaido Yamashiro-cho Hirao, Kizugawa-shi, Kyoto-fu 619-0202; Japan
- Coordinates: 34°46′29″N 135°48′58″E
- Operator: JR West
- Line: D Nara Line
- Distance: 4.4 km (2.7 miles) from Kizu
- Platforms: 2 side platforms
- Tracks: 2
- Train operators: JR West

Construction
- Structure type: Ground level
- Accessible: None

Other information
- Station code: JR-D17
- Website: Official website

History
- Opened: 13 March 1896

Passengers
- FY 2023: 1,120 daily

Services
Preceding station	JR West	Following station
Tamamizu towards Kyoto	Nara Line	Kamikoma towards Nara
Location
- Location within Kyoto Prefecture Location within Japan

Tanakura Station (棚倉駅, Tanakura-eki) is a passenger railway station located in the city of Kizugawa, Kyoto Prefecture, Japan, operated by West Japan Railway Company (JR West).

== Lines ==
Tanakura Station is served by the Nara Line, and is located at 4.4 km (2.7 miles) from the terminus of the line at Kizu. and 11.4 kilometers from Nara.

== Layout ==
The station consists of two opposed side platforms connected by a footbridge. The station is staffed.

=== Platforms ===
1	■ D Nara Line	for Uji and Kyoto
2	■ D Nara Line	for Nara

== History ==
Tanakura Station was opened on 13 March 1896 as a station on the Nara Railway, when the line was extended from Tamamizu Station to Kizu Station. The Nara Railway merged with the Kansai Railway in 1905 and was nationalized in 1907.With the privatization of Japanese National Railways (JNR) on 1 April 1987, the station came under the control of JR West. Station numbering was introduced in March 2018 with Tanakura being assigned station number JR-D17.

== Passenger statistics ==
According to the Kyoto Prefecture statistical report, the average number of passengers per day is as follows.

Year	Passengers
1999	589
2000	559
2001	570
2002	581
2003	581
2004	564
2005	575
2006	562
2007	560
2008	534
2009	515
2010	545
2011	568
2012	571
2013	562
2014	559
2015	587
2016	589
2017	573
2018	559
2019	552

== Surrounding area ==
- Fudo River Embankment Historic Park

== See also ==
- List of railway stations in Japan
