= Jōyō Station =

Railway station in Jōyō, Kyoto Prefecture, Japan

Jōyō Station 城陽駅
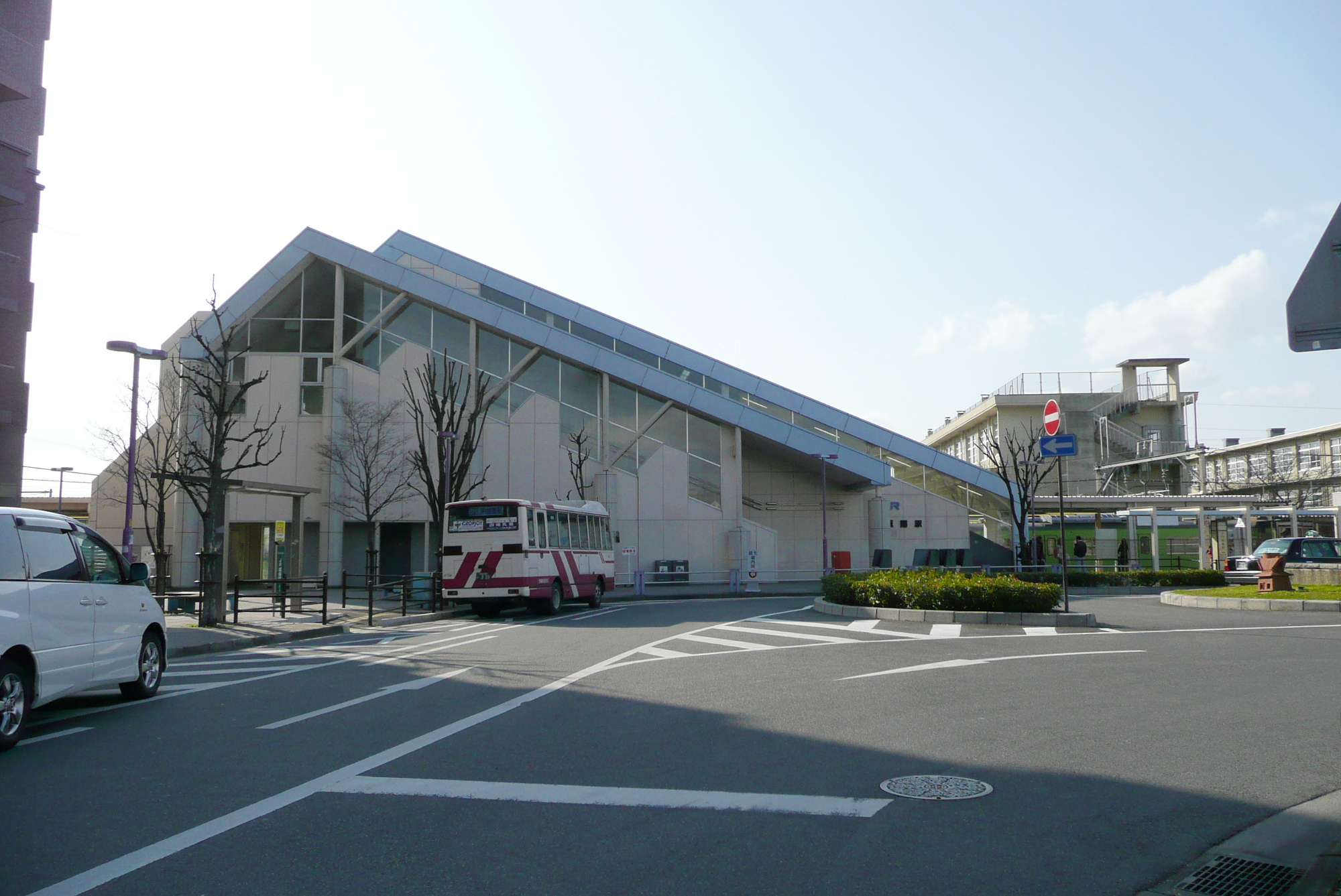
- Jōyō Station in January 2008

General information
- Location: 7 Hayashiguchi Terada, Jōyō-shi, Kyoto-fu 610-0121; Japan
- Coordinates: 34.8561°N 135.7804°E
- Operator: JR West
- Line: D Nara Line
- Distance: 14.5 km (9.0 miles) from Kizu
- Platforms: 2 side platforms
- Tracks: 2

Construction
- Structure type: Elevated
- Accessible: Yes

Other information
- Status: Staffed (Midori no Madoguchi)
- Station code: JR-D12
- Website: Official website

Passengers
- FY 2023: 6,642 daily

Services
Preceding station	JR West	Following station
Shinden towards Kyoto	Nara Line	Nagaike towards Nara
Location
- Location within Kyoto Prefecture Location within Japan

Jōyō Station (城陽駅, Jōyō-eki) is a passenger railway station located in the city of Jōyō, Kyoto Prefecture, Japan, operated by West Japan Railway Company (JR West). It has the station number "JR-D12".

== Lines ==
Jōyō Station is served by the Nara Line, and is located at 14.5 km (9.0 mi) from the terminus of the line at Kizu and 11.5 km (7.1 mi) from Nara.

== Layout ==
The station consists of two side platforms connected by an elevated station building. The station has a Midori no Madoguchi staffed ticket office. The IC card ticket "ICOCA" can be used at this station.

=== Platforms ===
1	■ D Nara Line	for Uji and Kyoto
2	■ D Nara Line	for Nara

== History ==
Jōyō was opened on 11 July 1958. With the privatization of Japanese National Railways (JNR) on 1 April 1987, the station came under the control of JR West. Station numbering was introduced in March 2018 with Jōyō being assigned station number JR-D12.

== Passenger statistics ==
According to the Kyoto Prefecture statistical report, the average number of passengers per day is as follows.

Year	Passengers
1999	2,488
2000	2,444
2001	2,803
2002	2,964
2003	3,044
2004	3,104
2005	3,208
2006	3,266
2007	3,340
2008	3,373
2009	3,318
2010	3,282
2011	3,265
2012	3,255
2013	3,359
2014	3,384
2015	3,486
2016	3,542
2017	3,507
2018	3,512
2019	3,440

== Surrounding area ==
- Seido Kanga ruins
- Joyo City Hall
- Kyoto Prefectural Joyo High School
- Joyo Municipal Joyo Junior High School
- Joyo City Terada Elementary School

== See also ==
- List of railway stations in Japan
