= Kamikoma Station =

Railway station in Kizugawa, Kyoto Prefecture, Japan

Kamikoma Station 上狛駅
- Kamikoma Station in 2026

General information
- Location: Yamashiro-chō Kamikoma Kitanodashiba, Kizugawa-shi, Kyoto-ku 619-0204; Japan
- Coordinates: 34°45′02″N 135°49′16″E
- Operator: JR West
- Line: D Nara Line
- Distance: 1.6 km (0.99 miles) from Kizu
- Platforms: 2 side platforms
- Tracks: 2
- Train operators: JR West

Construction
- Structure type: Ground level
- Accessible: None

Other information
- Station code: JR-D18
- Website: Official website

History
- Opened: 3 May 1902

Passengers
- FY 2023: 678 daily

Services
| Preceding station | JR West | Following station |
|---|---|---|
| Tanakura towards Kyoto | Nara Line | Kizu towards Nara |
Location
- Location within Kyoto Prefecture Location within Japan

Kamikoma Station (上狛駅, Kamikoma-eki) is a passenger railway station located in the city of Kizugawa, Kyoto Prefecture, Japan, operated by West Japan Railway Company (JR West). It has the station number "JR-D18".

== Lines ==
Kamikoma Station is served by the Nara Line], and is located at 1.6 km (0.99 miles) from the terminus of the line at Kizu. and 8.6 kilometers from Nara.

== Layout ==
The station consists of two opposed side platforms connected by a footbridge. The station is unattended.

=== Platforms ===
| 1 | ■ D Nara Line | for Uji and Kyoto |
| 2 | ■ D Nara Line | for Nara |

== History ==
Kamikoma Station was opened on 3 May 1902 as a station on the Nara Railway. The Nara Railway merged with the Kansai Railway in 1905 and was nationalized in 1907.With the privatization of Japanese National Railways (JNR) on 1 April 1987, the station came under the control of JR West. Station numbering was introduced in March 2018 with Kamikoma being assigned station number JR-D18.

== Passenger statistics ==
According to the Kyoto Prefecture statistical report, the average number of passengers per day is as follows. On the Nara Line, it is the station with the fewest passengers.

| Year | Passengers |
|---|---|
| 1999 | 597 |
| 2000 | 562 |
| 2001 | 515 |
| 2002 | 471 |
| 2003 | 463 |
| 2004 | 463 |
| 2005 | 460 |
| 2006 | 460 |
| 2007 | 468 |
| 2008 | 468 |
| 2009 | 452 |
| 2010 | 433 |
| 2011 | 448 |
| 2012 | 427 |
| 2013 | 430 |
| 2014 | 416 |
| 2015 | 410 |
| 2016 | 397 |
| 2017 | 397 |
| 2018 | 392 |
| 2019 | 383 |

== Surrounding area ==
- Kizugawa City Hall Yamashiro Branch (formerly Yamashiro Town Hall)
- Kizugawa City Kamikoma Elementary School
- Kyoto Prefectural Yamashiro Local Museum

== See also ==
- List of railway stations in Japan
