= Ōbaku Station (JR West) =

Railway station in Uji, Kyoto Prefecture, Japan

Ōbaku Station 黄檗駅
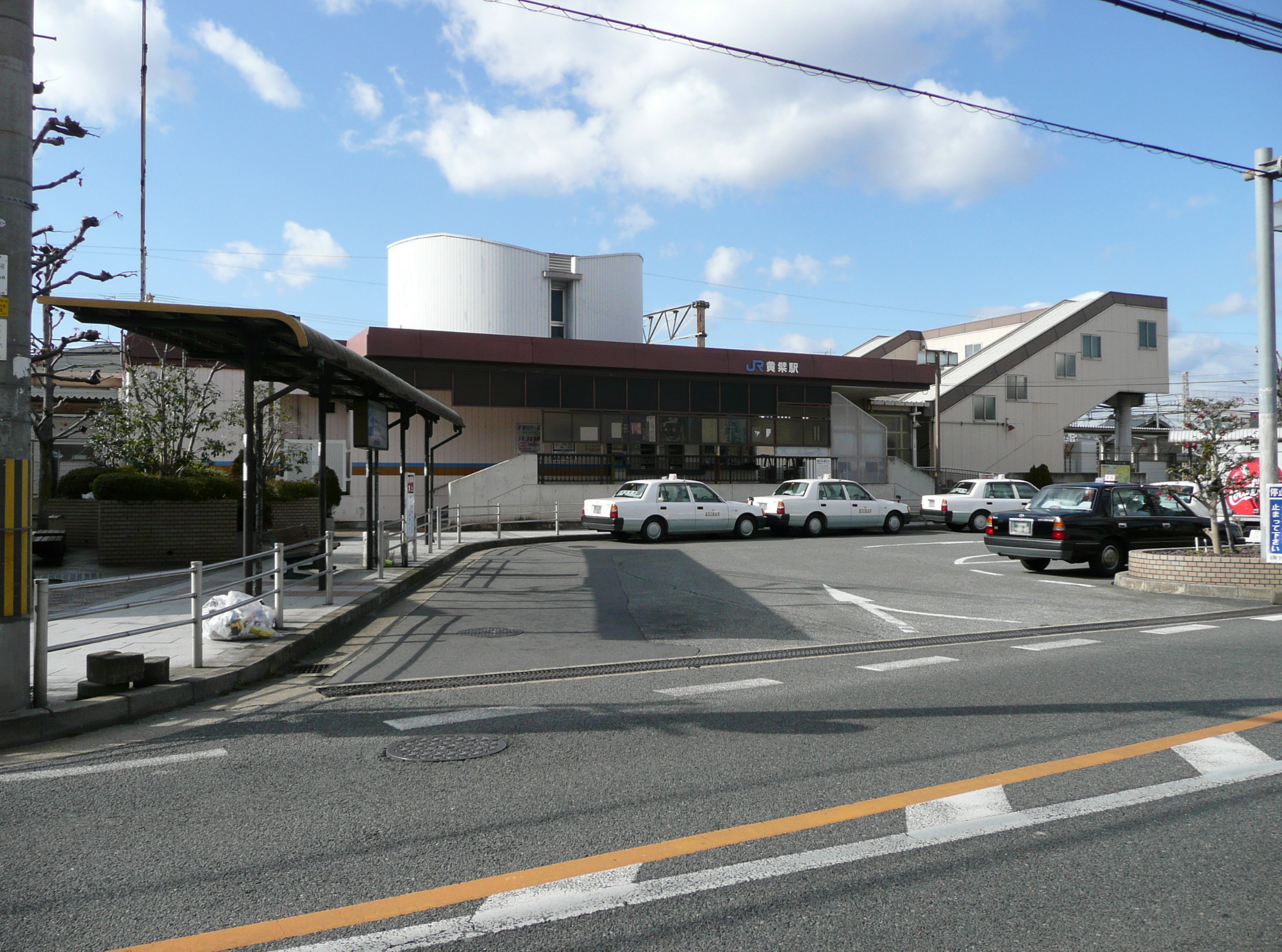
- Ōbaku Station JR building in December 2007 with the taxi circle in the foreground

General information
- Location: Uji, Kyoto Prefecture; Japan
- Coordinates: 34.9133°N 135.8032°E
- Operator: JR West
- Line: D Nara Line

Other information
- Station code: JR-D08
- Website: Official website

Passengers
- FY 2023: 7,190
Location
- Location within Kyoto Prefecture Location within Japan

Ōbaku Station (黄檗駅, Ōbaku-eki) is a train station located in Uji, Kyoto Prefecture, Japan, operated by West Japan Railway Company (JR West) It has the station number "JR-D08".

== Lines ==
Ōbaku Station is served by the Nara Line.

== Layout ==
The JR West station has two side platforms serving one track each.

=== Platforms ===
1	■ Nara Line	for Kyoto
2	■ Nara Line	for Uji and Nara

== History ==
Station numbering was introduced in March 2018 with Ōbaku being assigned station number JR-D08.

== Passenger statistics ==
According to Kyoto Prefecture statistics, the average number of passengers per day is as follows.

year	Passengers
1999	3,257
2000	3,282
2001	3,236
2002	3,148
2003	3,096
2004	3,096
2005	3,200
2006	3,282
2007	3,322
2008	3,458
2009	3,408
2010	3,460
2011	3,552
2012	3,604
2013	3,732
2014	3,773
2015	3,811
2016	3,753

== Adjacent stations ==
«	Service	»
JR West Nara Line
Kohata	Local	Uji
Regional Rapid Service: Does not stop at this station
Rapid Service: Does not stop at this station
Miyakoji Rapid Service: Does not stop at this station

== Surrounding area ==
- Kyoto University Uji Campus
