= Nara Line (JR West) =

Railway line in Kyoto and Nara Prefectures, Japan

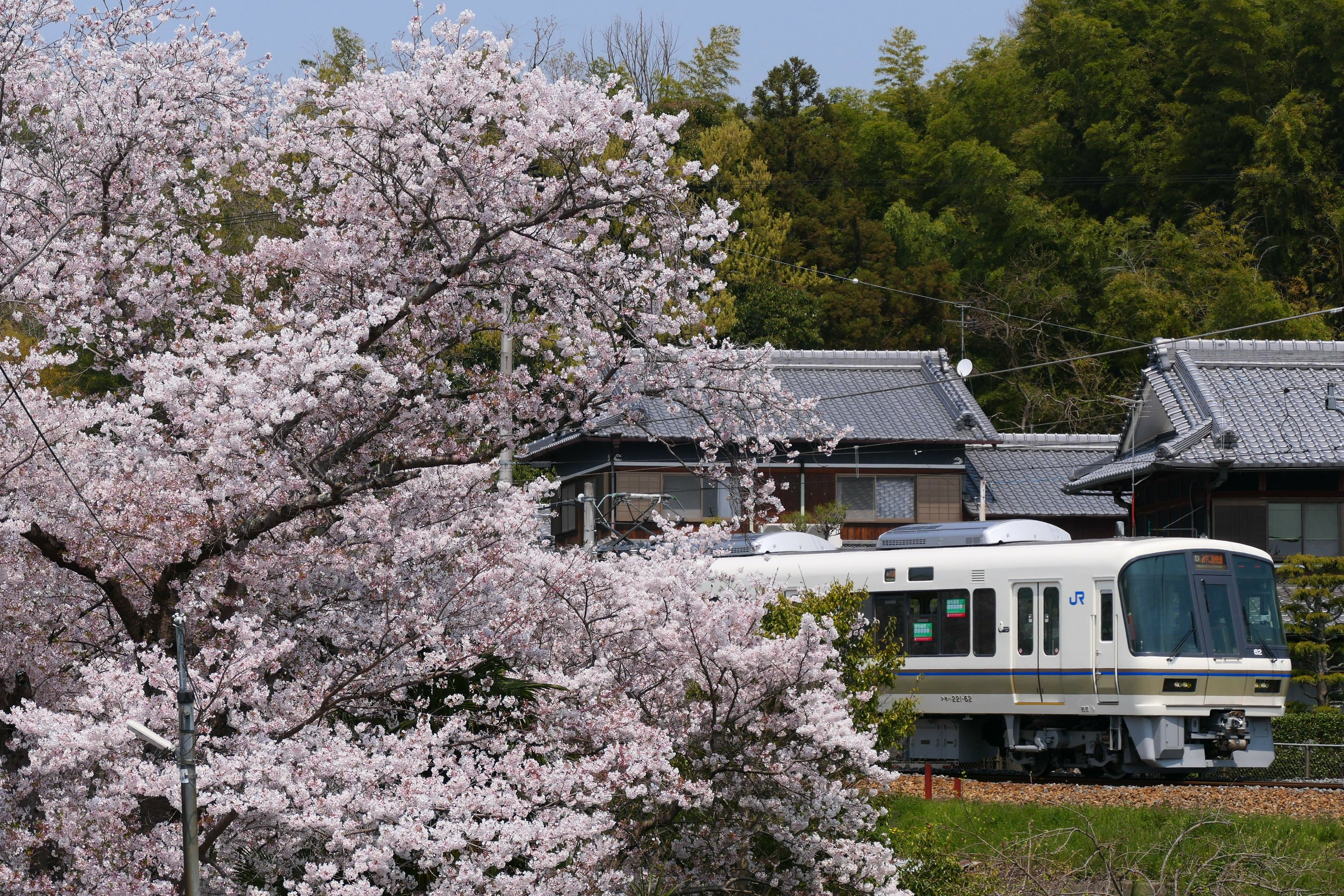
- A 221 series EMU on a Miyakoji Rapid service in April 2020

Overview
- Owner: JR West
- Locale: Kyoto Prefecture
- Termini: Kizu; Kyoto
- Stations: 19

Service
- Type: Heavy rail
- System: Urban Network
- Rolling stock: Local: 205 series, Rapid: 221 series

History
- Opened: 1879; 147 years ago

Technical
- Line length: 34.7 km (21.6 mi)
- Track gauge: 1,067 mm (3 ft 6 in)
- Electrification: 1,500 V DC overhead catenary
- Operating speed: 110 km/h (68 mph) (double-track); 95 km/h (59 mph) (single-track)

The Nara Line (奈良線, Nara-sen) is a commuter rail line in the Osaka–Kobe–Kyoto metropolitan area, operated by the West Japan Railway Company (JR West). Its official termini are Kizu Station in Kizugawa and Kyōto Station in Kyoto, within Kyoto Prefecture; however, all trains continue past Kizu on the Yamatoji Line (Kansai Main Line) to Nara Station in Nara, Nara Prefecture.

== Overview ==
Route map

Detail of the Fushimi area in Kyoto

The Nara Line is a part of the JR West "Urban Network" in the Kyoto-Osaka-Kobe area. Its primary role is that of an intercity-suburban commuter line, ferrying people to and from work and school in Kyoto and Nara; it is also well-used by tourists holding the Japan Rail Pass, as visiting the historical landmarks of Uji and Nara makes an easy day-trip from Kyoto. At Kyoto, the line connects to the Tōkaidō Shinkansen, the Tōkaidō Main Line (Biwako Line / JR Kyoto Line), and the San'in Main Line (Sagano Line), while at Kizu, it connects to the Kansai Main Line (Yamatoji Line) for Kamo, and the Katamachi Line (Gakkentoshi Line) for Kyōbashi Station in Osaka. At Nara, travelers can change trains to continue westward to Hōryūji and JR Namba, or head south on the Sakurai Line (Man'yō Mahoroba Line) toward the many shrines, temples and archaeological sites of Tenri and Sakurai.

As Kintetsu operates a "Nara Line" of its own, the line is often referred to as the "JR Nara Line" ("JNR Nara Line" prior to 1988). Strictly speaking, the Kintetsu Nara Line links Osaka and Nara (a counterpart to the Yamatoji Line), rather than Kyoto and Nara (connected primarily by the Kintetsu Kyoto Line). However, there are many through trains to the Kintetsu Nara Line from Kyōto Station, so "JR" is often appended for clarity. This was aided by the 1988 introduction of the official nicknames "JR Kyoto Line", "JR Kobe Line" (for parts of the Tōkaidō Main Line and San'yō Main Line) and "JR Takarazuka Line" (southern half of the Fukuchiyama Line) within the Urban Network, making the "JR Nara Line" construction a natural parallel, if unofficial, usage.

Since the formation of JR West in 1988, the line has been under the jurisdiction of the Tennoji Railway Operations Office in Osaka, and its trains use the Osaka Branch's rail yards in Nara. On the other hand, the stations themselves (apart from Kizu) are administered by the Kyoto Branch of JR West. The official line color used on JR West route maps and station guides is brown.

The entirety of the line is part of the Greater Osaka Metropolitan Area. As such, all stations are outfitted with card readers for ICOCA and compatible smart fare-cards; however, Nagaike – Kamikoma are unstaffed, and have only simplified automatic ticket gates. Apart from a few stations, the J-Through Card (a prepaid, single-charge fare card) can be used in lieu of cash to buy passenger tickets.

While Kizu is properly the "up" (上り, nobori) end of the line, the Kansai Main Line's historically greater importance with respect to the Nara Line means that it is treated as "down" (下り, kudari). Thus, trains bound for Nara are "down" trains, and those bound for Kyoto are "up", according to the direction they travel on the Yamatoji Line between Kizu and Nara. Except where noted, this article adheres to the same convention.

=== Line name ===
The Nara Line proper runs from Kyōto Station to Kizu Station, and lies entirely within Kyoto Prefecture; it has no trackage whatsoever in Nara Prefecture. However, the line was originally built by Nara Railway between Kyoto Station and Nara Station; it was only later, after merging with Kansai Railway, that the section between Kizu and Nara became a part of the Osaka – Nagoya route and was officially made a separate line.

Nara Line services run between Nara and Kyōto stations, and are treated as such by passenger announcements and route maps. Thus, even while operating on the Kansai Main Line (Yamatoji Line), trains to and from Kyoto are considered as being on the "Nara Line".

== Station list ==
- This chart is arranged in the "down" direction (Kyoto → Nara), according to the direction of the Kansai Main Line.
- The number in parentheses next to a subway station name is the station number.
- : a "station within Kyoto" designated for passenger tickets used with limited-express or Shinkansen tickets. A ticketholder whose destination is marked Kyōto-shinai (京都市内; lit. "within Kyoto city limits") may continue on to any of these stations for no additional charge.
- Stopping patterns:
  - Local trains stop at all stations (not shown on chart)
  - Other designations: ● Stop; ｜Pass
  - Miyakoji Rapid: ○ Stop only during the New Year holiday (1–4 January)
- Track:
  - ∥: Double-track section; ◇: Single-track section; ∨: Double-track section ends; ∧: Double-track section begins
    (trains can pass each other at all stations in single-track sections)

Line name	No.	Station	Japanese	Distance (km)		Regional Rapid (Note: 区間快速)	Rapid	Miyakoji Rapid (Note: みやこ路快速)	Transfers		Location	
Line name	No.	Station	Japanese	Between stations	Total	Regional Rapid	Rapid	Miyakoji Rapid	Transfers		Location	
Nara Line	JR-D01	Kyōto	京都	-	0.0	●	●	●	Tōkaidō Main Line (Biwako Line, JR Kyoto Line) ( A31 ); Kosei Line ( B31 ) (Note: The Kosei line's official terminus is Yamashina Station on the Tōkaidō Main Line (Biwako Line), but all trains continue through to Kyoto.); San'in Main Line (Sagano Line) ( E01 ); Tōkaidō Shinkansen; B Kintetsu Kyoto Line (B01); Karasuma Line (K11)	∥	Shimogyō-ku, Kyoto	Kyoto
Nara Line	JR-D02	Tōfukuji	東福寺	1.1	1.1	●	●	●	Keihan Main Line (KH36)	∥	Higashiyama, Kyoto	Kyoto
Nara Line	JR-D03	Inari	稲荷	1.6	2.7	｜	｜	○		∥	Fushimi-ku, Kyoto	Kyoto
Nara Line	JR-D04	JR Fujinomori	JR藤森	2.3	5.0	｜	｜	｜		∥	Fushimi-ku, Kyoto	Kyoto
Nara Line	JR-D05	Momoyama	桃山	2.2	7.2	｜	｜	｜		∥	Fushimi-ku, Kyoto	Kyoto
Nara Line	JR-D06	Rokujizō	六地蔵	2.4	9.6	●	●	●	Kyoto Municipal Subway Tōzai Line (T01); Keihan Uji Line (KH73)	∥	Uji	Kyoto
Nara Line	JR-D07	Kohata	木幡	1.0	10.6	｜	｜	｜		∥	Uji	Kyoto
Nara Line	JR-D08	Ōbaku	黄檗	1.4	12.0	｜	｜	｜	Keihan Uji Line (KH75)	∥	Uji	Kyoto
Nara Line	JR-D09	Uji	宇治	2.9	14.9	●	●	●		∥	Uji	Kyoto
Nara Line	JR-D10	JR Ogura	JR小倉	1.4	16.3	●	●	｜		∥	Uji	Kyoto
Nara Line	JR-D11	Shinden	新田	1.8	18.1	●	●	｜	B Kintetsu Kyoto Line (B12:Ōkubo)	∥	Uji	Kyoto
Nara Line	JR-D12	Jōyō	城陽	2.1	20.2	●	●	●		∨	Jōyō	Kyoto
Nara Line	JR-D13	Nagaike	長池	1.8	22.0	●	｜	｜		◇	Jōyō	Kyoto
Nara Line	JR-D14	Yamashiro-Aodani	山城青谷	2.0	24.0	●	｜	｜		◇	Jōyō	Kyoto
Nara Line	JR-D15	Yamashiro-Taga	山城多賀	1.3	25.3	●	｜	｜		∧	Ide, Tsuzuki District	Kyoto
Nara Line	JR-D16	Tamamizu	玉水	2.0	27.3	●	●	●		∨	Ide, Tsuzuki District	Kyoto
Nara Line	JR-D17	Tanakura	棚倉	3.0	30.3	●	｜	｜		◇	Kizugawa	Kyoto
Nara Line	JR-D18	Kamikoma	上狛	2.8	33.1	●	｜	｜		◇	Kizugawa	Kyoto
Nara Line	JR-D19	Kizu	木津	1.6	34.7	●	●	●	Kansai Main Line (Yamatoji Line) ( Q38 ); Katamachi Line (Gakkentoshi Line) ( H18 )	∧	Kizugawa	Kyoto
Yamatoji Line	JR-D19	Kizu	木津	1.6	34.7	●	●	●	Kansai Main Line (Yamatoji Line) ( Q38 ); Katamachi Line (Gakkentoshi Line) ( H18 )	∧	Kizugawa	Kyoto
Yamatoji Line	JR-D20	Narayama	平城山	3.2	37.9	●	｜	｜	(Note: Kansai Main Line (Yamatoji Line) Rapid Service and Yamatoji Rapid stop; Gakkentoshi Line Rapid Service stop)	∥	Nara	Nara
Yamatoji Line	JR-D21	Nara	奈良	3.8	41.7	●	●	●	Kansai Main Line (Yamatoji Line) ( Q36 ); Sakurai Line (Man-yō Mahoroba Line)	∥	Nara	Nara

- Uji City is considering the possibility of a new station between Ōbaku and Uji (cf. Mimurodo Station on the Keihan Uji Line.) However, it is not a part of the current track-duplication project.
- Of these stations, Kizu, Uji, Rokujizō, and Kyoto are directly operated by JR West; Yamashiro-Taga is unstaffed; Kamikoma and Tanakura are staffed part-time; and the remainder are staffed by JR West Transportation Services.

=== Abandoned sections ===
Numbers in parentheses are the distance from Kyoto Station. The portion between Kyoto and Fushimi is now part of the Kintetsu Kyoto Line.

Kyoto (0.00 km) – Hachijō Temporary Station (0.80 km) – Tōji Temporary Station (1.13 km) – Fushimi (5.31 km) – Momoyama (7.08 km)

== Rolling stock ==
=== Current rolling stock ===
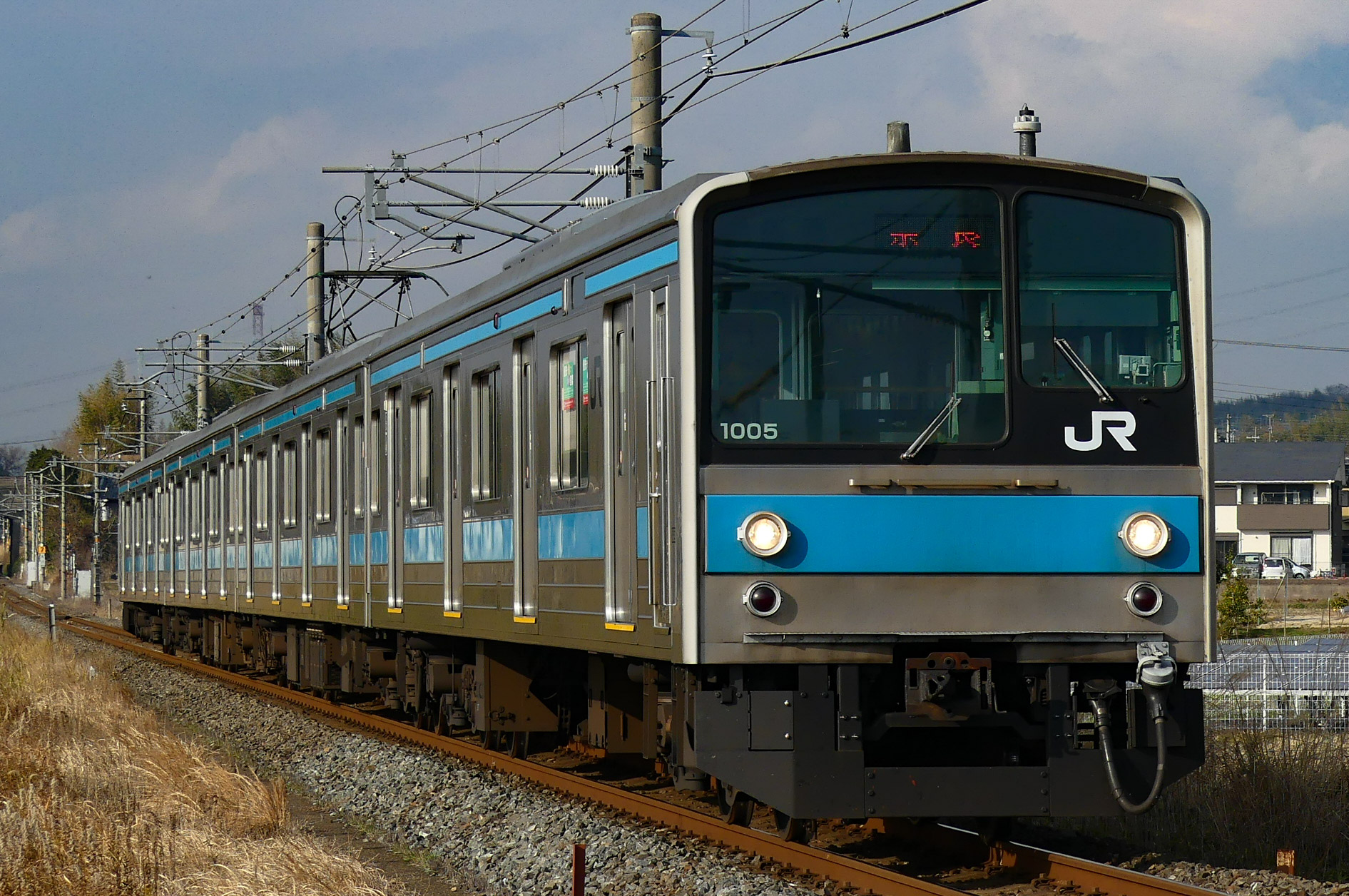
205-series in January 2019

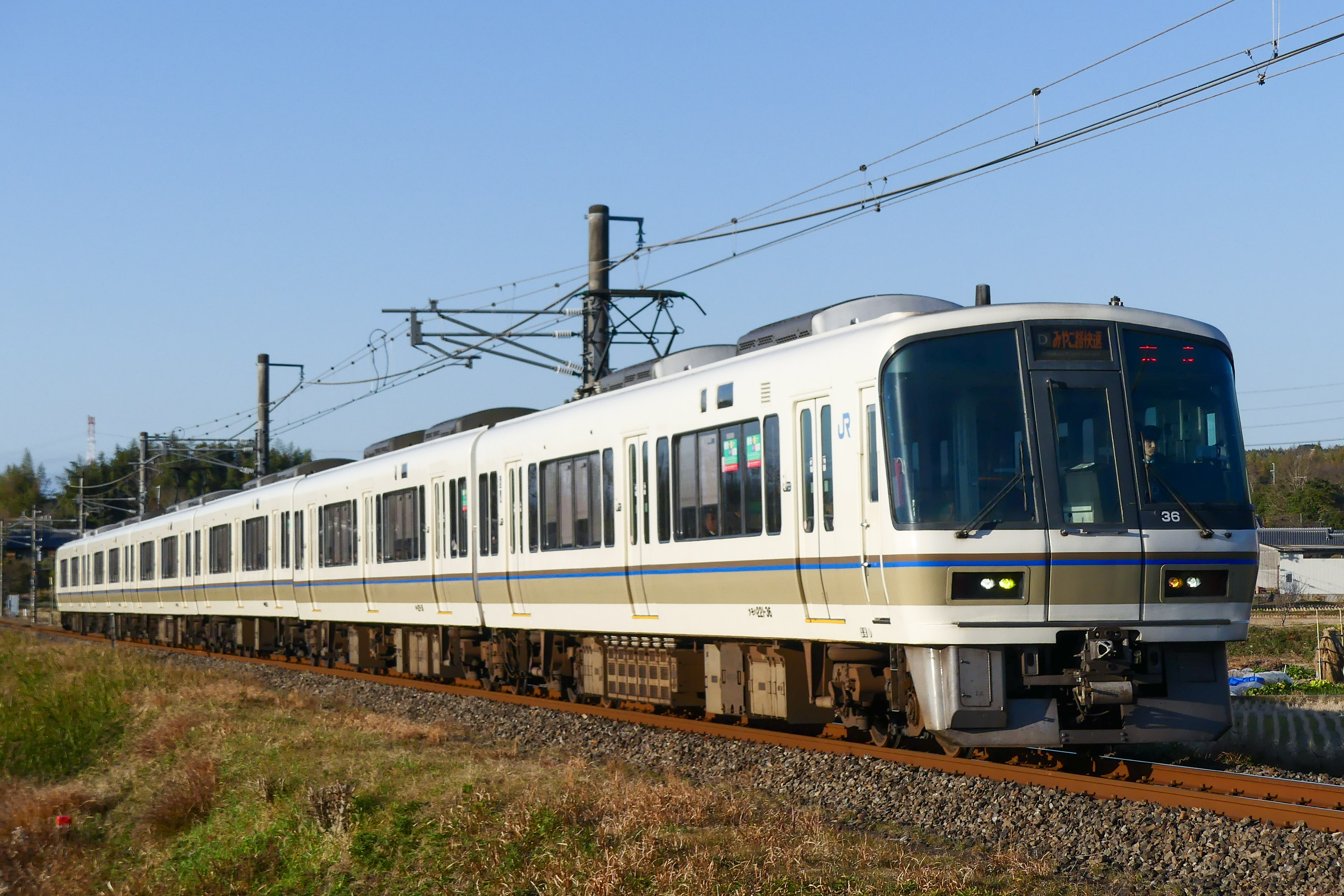
221-series in January 2017

All trains are based at Nara Depot.

- 221 series EMU. Used for Rapid trains.

Also operated on the Yamatoji Line and Osaka Loop Line, there are 4 and 6-car trainsets. 4 and 6-car trainsets are mainly used for Miyakoji Rapid, Rapid Service, and Regional Rapid services, though on the Nara Line, the majority of trains are formed as 4 car sets.

- 205 series EMU (from 18 March 2018). Used for Local trains.

=== Former rolling stock ===
Railcars that were used for passenger trains are as follows.

==== Before electrification ====
- KiHa 55 Series
- KiHa 58 Series
- KiHa 65 Series
- KiHa 45 Series
- KiHa 40 series
- KiHa 35
- KiHa 20 Series
- KiHa 10 Series

==== After electrification ====
- 103 series 4-car EMU (23 March 1994 to 3 March 2022). Local trains on the Nara Line (and the Yamatoji Line). Removed from regular service on 3 March 2022 but for some time remained available as spare cars and were occasionally used.
- 105 series
- 115 series
- 117 series
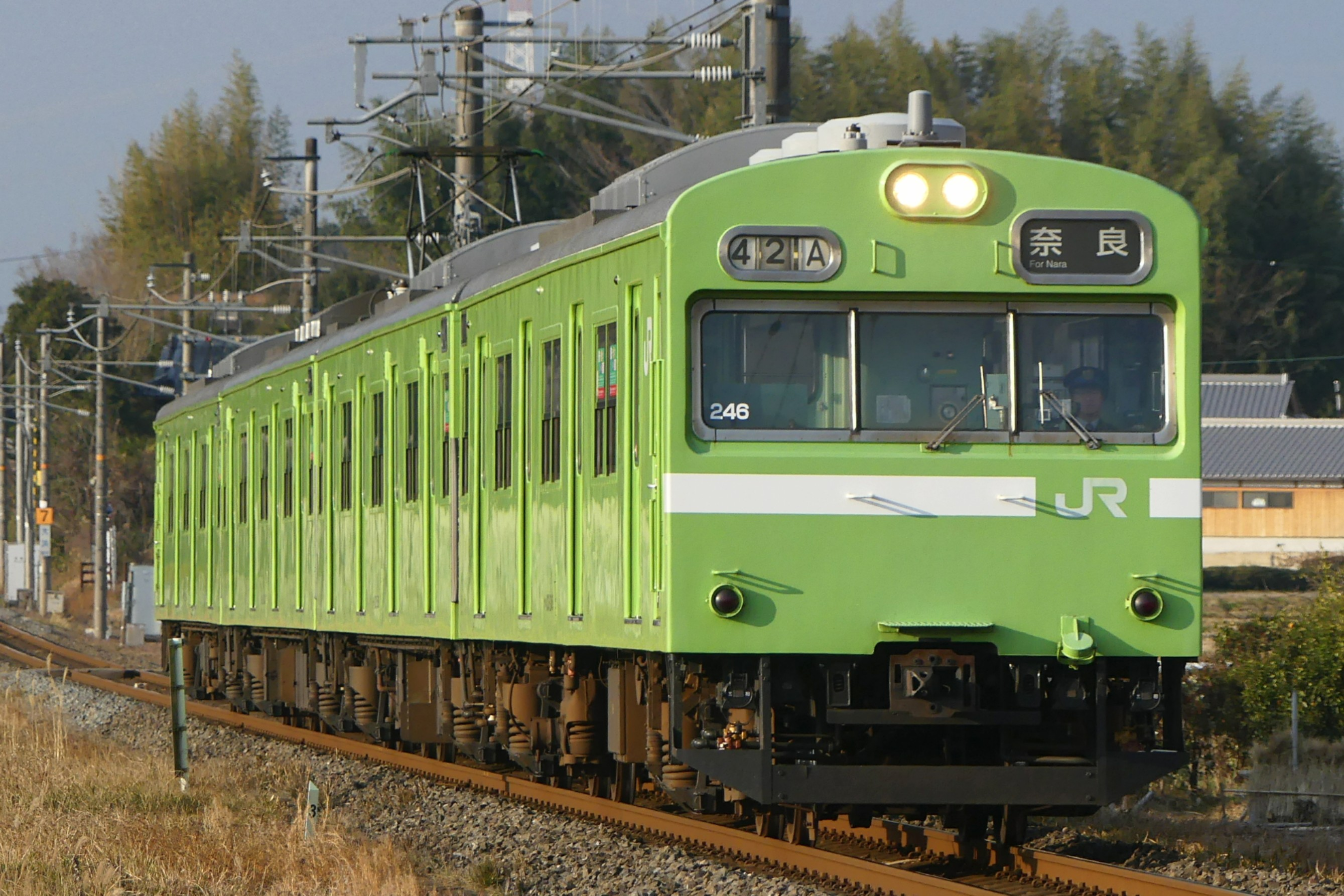
103 series in December 2017

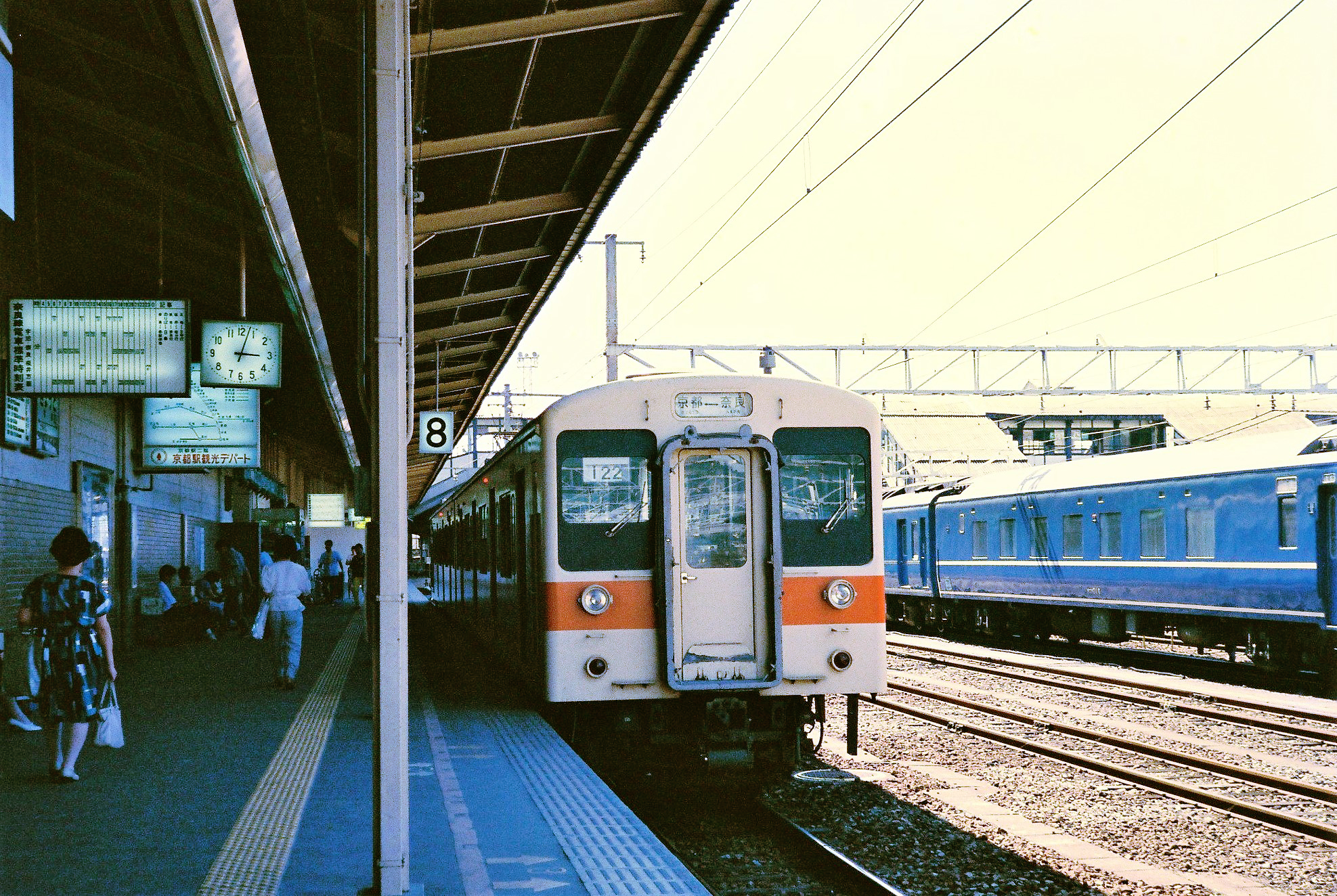
105 series at Kyoto Station in August 1987

== History ==
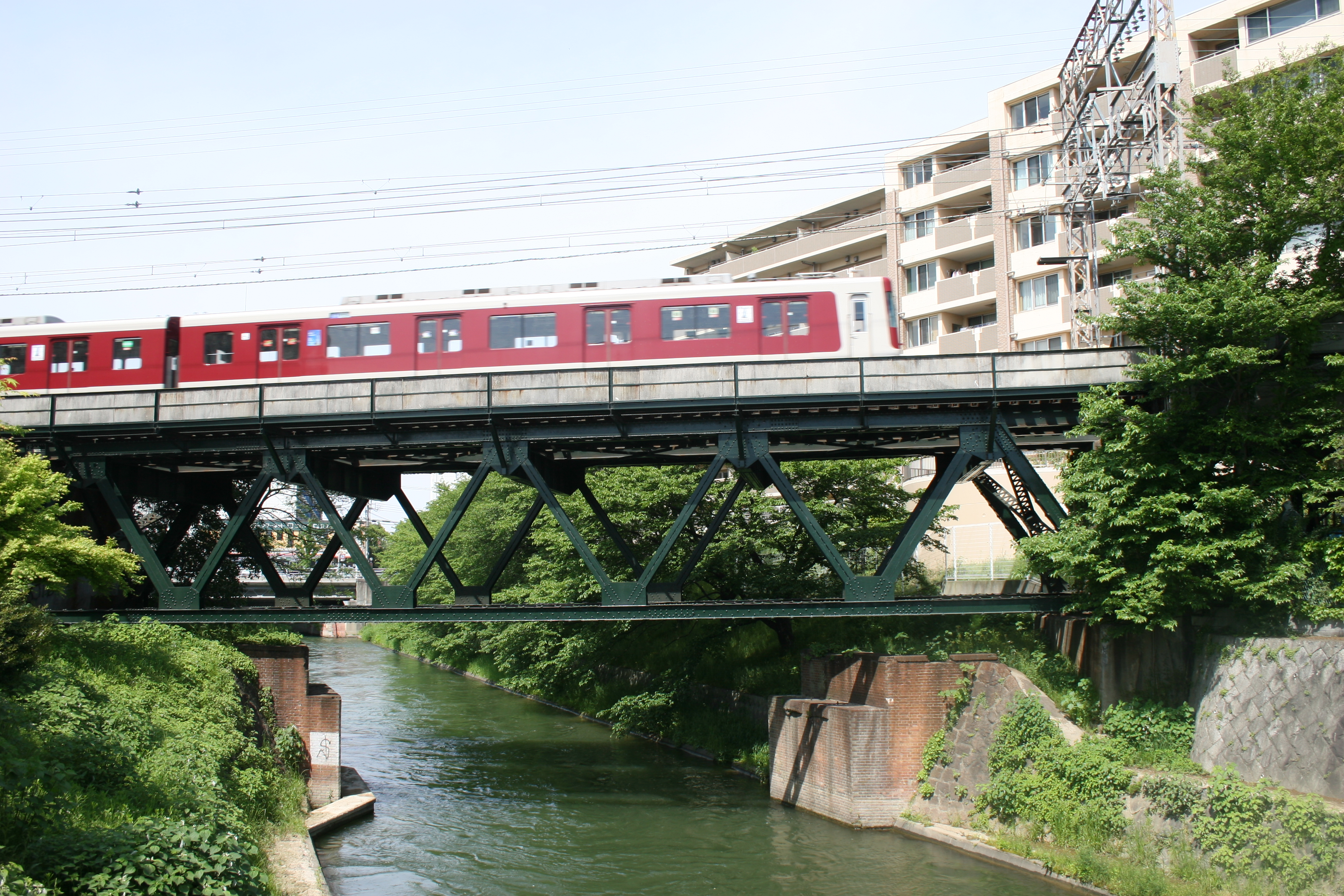
Abandoned abutments of a bridge on the former route of the Nara Line are under the bridge of the Kintetsu Kyoto Line.

The Nara Line was originally constructed from Kyoto to Nara by Nara Railway, but at the time of its completion, the Kyoto – Momoyama section ran via the route now used by the Kintetsu Kyoto Line. In 1921, on the day that the Tōkaidō Main Line was re-routed from its original path to the new Baba (Zeze) – Kyoto alignment via the Higashiyama Tunnel, the Kyoto – Inari portion of the old route became part of the Nara Line, and new track was laid between Inari and Momoyama. At the same time, the original Kyoto – Fushimi alignment was abandoned, and the Fushimi – Momoyama section became freight-only. Later on, the old right-of-way from Kyoto to Fushimi was sold off to the Kintetsu Kyoto Line's predecessor, Nara Electric Railway.

After the Nara Electric Railway line opened in 1928, its frequency of service and drastically reduced transit time took away much of the demand for through-service between the Tokaido Main Line and the Nara Line. In the 1950s, the Nara Line was among the earliest of the JNR lines to be converted from steam locomotives to diesel multiple unit trainsets, and new stations were opened; after that, however, not much capital was spent on the line, and was not until 1984 that it was finally electrified. In short, it was treated entirely as a local line, rather than as an intercity commuter corridor. The turning point for the Nara Line was only after Japanese National Railways was privatized, and it became part of the JR West network. An article in the Asahi Shimbun from 1991, the same year as JR announced it would be pumping capital into the Nara Line, described the perceived cause for this sudden interest as follows: "During [the previous year's] string of visits by the new Emperor and Empress, their Majesties arrived in Kyoto via JR Central's Tōkaidō Shinkansen, then immediately boarded the Kintetsu line for Nara, ignoring the local JR West trains entirely."

=== Timeline ===
- 18 August 1879: Kyoto – Inari – Ōtani opened as part of the Government-Operated Railway (later the Tōkaidō Main Line). Inari Station opens.
- 5 September 1895: Nara Railway opens between Kyoto and Fushimi (3 mi. 23 ch. ≒ 5.29 km). Fushimi Station opens. Kyoto Station is operated in conjunction with the Government Railway.
- 3 November 1895: Fushimi – Momoyama extension (1 mi. 9 ch. ≒ 2.19 km) opens. Momoyama Station opens.
- 25 January 1896: Momoyama – Tamamizu extension (12 mi. 46 ch. ≒ 20.24 km) opens. Kohata, Uji, Shinden, Nagaike, Tamamizu Stations open.
- 13 March 1896: Tamamizu – Kizu extension (4 mi. 50 ch. ≒ 7.44 km) opens. Tanakura and Kizu stations open.
- 18 April 1896: Kizu – Nara section opens; entire Kyoto – Nara line complete.
- 21 April 1896: Tōji Temporary Station opens.
- 1 April 1897: Nara Railway Kyoto Station renamed Shichijō Station.
- 3 May 1902: Kamikoma Station opens.
- 12 November 1902: Operating distance units changed from a combination of miles and chains to miles only (21 mi. 48 ch. → 21.6 mi.).
- 7 February 1905: Nara Railway cedes its track to Kansai Railway.
- 1 October 1907: Kansai Railway is nationalized in accordance with the Railway Nationalization Act.
- 1 August 1908: Shichijō Station merged with Kyoto Station.
- 12 October 1909: Kizu – Kyoto officially designated as the "Nara Line".
- 19 December 1910: Ujigawa Signal Station installed between Kohata and Uji stations.
- 20 June 1913: Hachijō Signal Station is added between Tōji Temporary Station and Kyoto Station.
- 5 November 1913: Ujigawa Signal Station is abandoned.
- 23 July 1914: Tōji Temporary Station between Fushimi and Kyoto is abandoned.
- 15 August 1914: Hachijō Signal Station abandoned.
- 20 March 1921: Ujigawa Signal Station is added once more between Kohata and Uji stations.
- 1 August 1921: The Nara Line's Kyoto – Fushimi alignment (3.3 mi. ≒ 5.31 km) is abandoned. The remaining Fushimi – Momoyama section (1.1 mi. ≒ 1.77 km) is closed to passenger traffic. The Tōkaidō Main Line's old Kyoto – Inari alignment (1.8 mi. ≒ 2.90 km), made obsolete after the opening of the Higashiyama Tunnel, is appropriated for the Nara Line. New track (2.6 mi. ≒ 4.18 km) is laid between Inari and Momoyama stations.
- 1 April 1922: Ujigawa Signal Station (宇治川信号所, Ujigawa Shingōsho) renamed Ujigawa Signal Box (宇治川新号場, Ujigawa Shingōjō).
- 13 February 1926: Aodani Bairin Temporary Station opens.
- 1 April 1926: Ujigawa Signal Box abandoned.
- 3 September 1928: Momoyama – Fushimi freight branch closed. Fushimi Station abandoned.
- 1 April 1930: Operating distance units changed to the metric system (21.6 mi. → 34.7 km).
- 2 December 1933: Aodani Bairin Temporary Station made permanent and renamed Yamashiro-Aodani.
- 15 July 1955: Yamashiro-Taga Station opens.
- 27 December 1957: Tōfukuji Station opens.
- 11 July 1958: Jōyō Station opens.
- 21 April 1961: Ōbaku Station opens.
- 2 March 1982: Centralized traffic control (CTC) introduced to the line.
- 1 October 1984: Electrification of the line (Kyoto – Kizu). Operations switched to 105 series and 113 series trainsets. Kinokawa Express service (Kyoto–Wakayama) is ended.
- 1 April 1987: Japanese National Railways (JNR) is privatized and divided; the Nara Line is dealt to the newly formed West Japan Railway Company (JR West). JR Freight becomes a Category-2 operator.
- 16 March 1991: Rapid Service introduced, using 117 series trainsets. The only stop at the time of introduction is Uji, with Inari as a temporary addition during the New Year holiday.
- 22 October 1992: Rokujizō Station opens. Jōyō becomes a Rapid-Service stop.
- March 1994: 113-series trainsets retired from the line.
- 4 September 1994: 105 series trainsets retired from the line (moved mainly to Sakurai Line and Wakayama Line service).
- 8 March 1997: JR Fujinomori Station opens.
- 10 May 1999: Rokujizō becomes a Rapid Service stop.
- 3 March 2001: Kyoto – JR Fujinomori, Uji – Shinden sections double-tracked. JR Ogura Station opens. Regional Rapid Service begins. Miyakoji Rapid Service introduced, using 221 series trainsets; 117 series trainsets retired from the line.
- 1 October 2001: Tōfukuji becomes a Regional Rapid and Rapid-Service stop.
- 15 March 2003: Tōfukuji and Tamamizu become Miyakoji Rapid stops; Tamamizu becomes a Rapid-Service stop.
- 1 April 2003: JR Freight ceases Category-2 operation on the line.
- 2008: ATS-P installed on the line.
- 1 June 2008: All limited expresses and liners made non-smoking.
- 29 June 2008: Elevated platforms for the Kansai Main Line and Nara Line at Nara Station enter service
- 1 July 2009: All stations made non-smoking.
- 1 December 2010: Administration of the line is changed from the Osaka and Kyoto branch offices of JR West to the Kinki Unified Operations Headquarters
- 14 March 2015: The Nara Line receives the line designation “D” in station announcements and route diagrams as part of a program for the entire JR West Urban Network
- 17 March 2018: Stations on the line receive numbering in station announcements and route diagrams, with Kyoto designated as “D01” and Nara as “D21”. Series 205 trainsets begin revenue service on the line.
- 14 March 2020: All weekend Miyakoji Rapid Service trains, previously run as 4- and 6-car trainsets, unified at 6-car length.
- 6 December 2020: The double-track section between Yamashiro-Taga and Tamamizu enters service.

== Future developments ==
=== Double-tracking ===
Report No. 8 from the 2004 Kinki Transportation Commission, "Projects contributing to the improvement of services through strengthening transport capacity, etc." (輸送力の強化等によるサービス向上に資する事業, Yusōryoku no kyōka nado ni yoru sābisu kōjō ni shi-suru jigyō), included double-tracking on the JR Fujinomori – Uji and Shinden – Kizu sections of the Nara Line. Following the completion of double-tracking work on the Sanin Main Line (Sagano Line) between Kyoto and Sonobe in March 2010, JR West and Kyoto Prefecture began conferring with regards to double-tracking of the Nara Line.

However, due to the financial constraints of these local governments, as well as JR West's own fiscal condition, it was ultimately announced that the line would only be fully double-tracked as far as Jōyō, with an additional double-track section between Yamashiro-Taga and Tamamizu. Pre-construction work began in 2013, and the overall duplication is expected to last approximately 10 years, with completion in 2022–23. The remaining single-track sections will be between Jōyō and Yamashiro-Taga, and between Tamamizu and Kizu.
