= ICOCA =

Contactless smart card used in Japan

- Location: Usable nationwide Distributed in Kansai, San'yō, Hokuriku, Kagawa, and Tokushima
- Launched: November 1, 2003
- Technology: FeliCa
- Manager: JR West
- Currency: Japanese yen (¥20,000 maximum load)
- Stored-value: Pay as you go
- Credit expiry: Ten years after last use
- Retailed: JR West, Osaka Metro, Kyoto Subway, Kobe Subway, Kintetsu, Hankyu, Hanshin, Nankai, Osaka Monorail, Kita-Osaka Kyuko, Keihan, Eizan Railway, Keifuku, Sangi Railway, Ohmi Railway, Sanyo Railway, Kobe Electric Railway, Kobe New Transit, Nose Electric Railway, Yokkaichi Asunarou Railway, Hapi-Line Fukui, IR Ishikawa Railway, Ainokaze Toyama Railway, Hiroshima Rapid Transit, Iyotetsu, JR Shikoku (Takamatsu area only), Matsue City Traffic Office, Sanyo Bus, Ichibata Bus, Tokushima Bus, other operators
- Variants: ICOCA; SMART ICOCA; SHIKOKU ICOCA (sold by JR Shikoku); IR Ishikawa ICOCA (sold by IR Ishikawa Railway); Ainokaze ICOCA (sold by Ainokaze Toyama Railway); Hapi-Line Fukui ICOCA (sold by Hapi-Line Fukui); Apple Pay TOICA (sold by JR Central)
- Website: www.jr-odekake.net/icoca/

ICOCA is a rechargeable contactless smart card used on the JR West rail network in Japan. The card was launched on November 1, 2003, for usage on the Urban Network, which encompasses the major cities of Osaka, Kyoto, and Kobe (Keihanshin). It is now usable on many other networks nationwide. The ICOCA area has gradually been expanded, and now includes the San'yo region through the Okayama and Hiroshima urban areas, and some lines in northern Shikoku, San'in and Hokuriku regions as of 2024.

ICOCA is an abbreviation of "IC Operating Card" and is also a play on the phrase "Iko ka" (行こか), an informal, Kansai dialect invitation meaning "Shall we go?"

The mascot for ICOCA is a blue platypus named Ico the Platypus (カモノハシのイコちゃん, Kamonohashi no Iko-chan). Platypus characters for the children's ICOCA also exist and are named Icota (イコ太, Ikota) and Icomi (イコ美, Ikomi).

== Functions and services ==
Usage of the card involves passing it over a card reader. The technology allows for the card to be read at some distance from the reader, so contact is not required, and many people leave the card in their wallet and just pass the wallet over the reader as they enter the ticket gate.

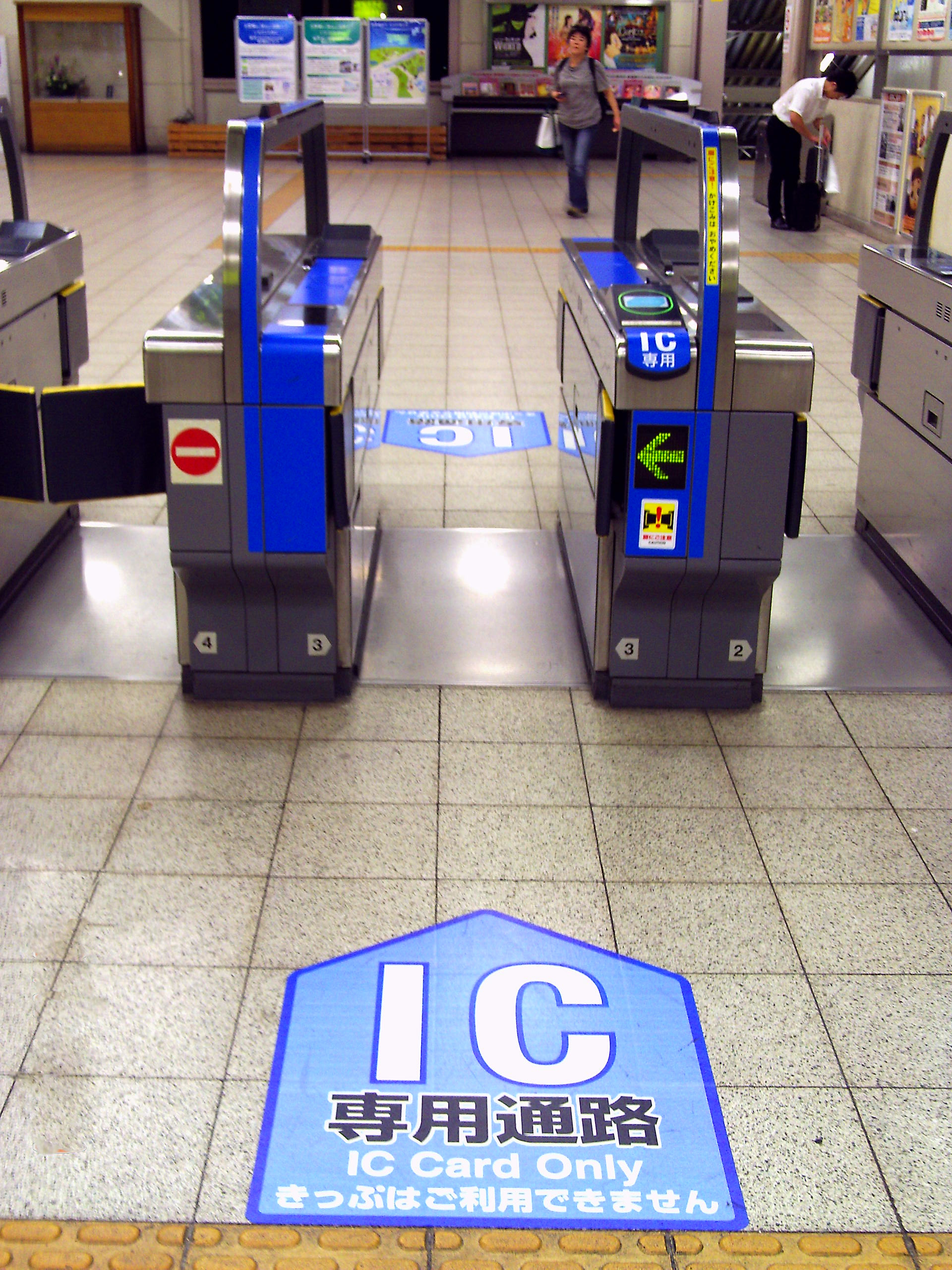
An ICOCA ticket gate

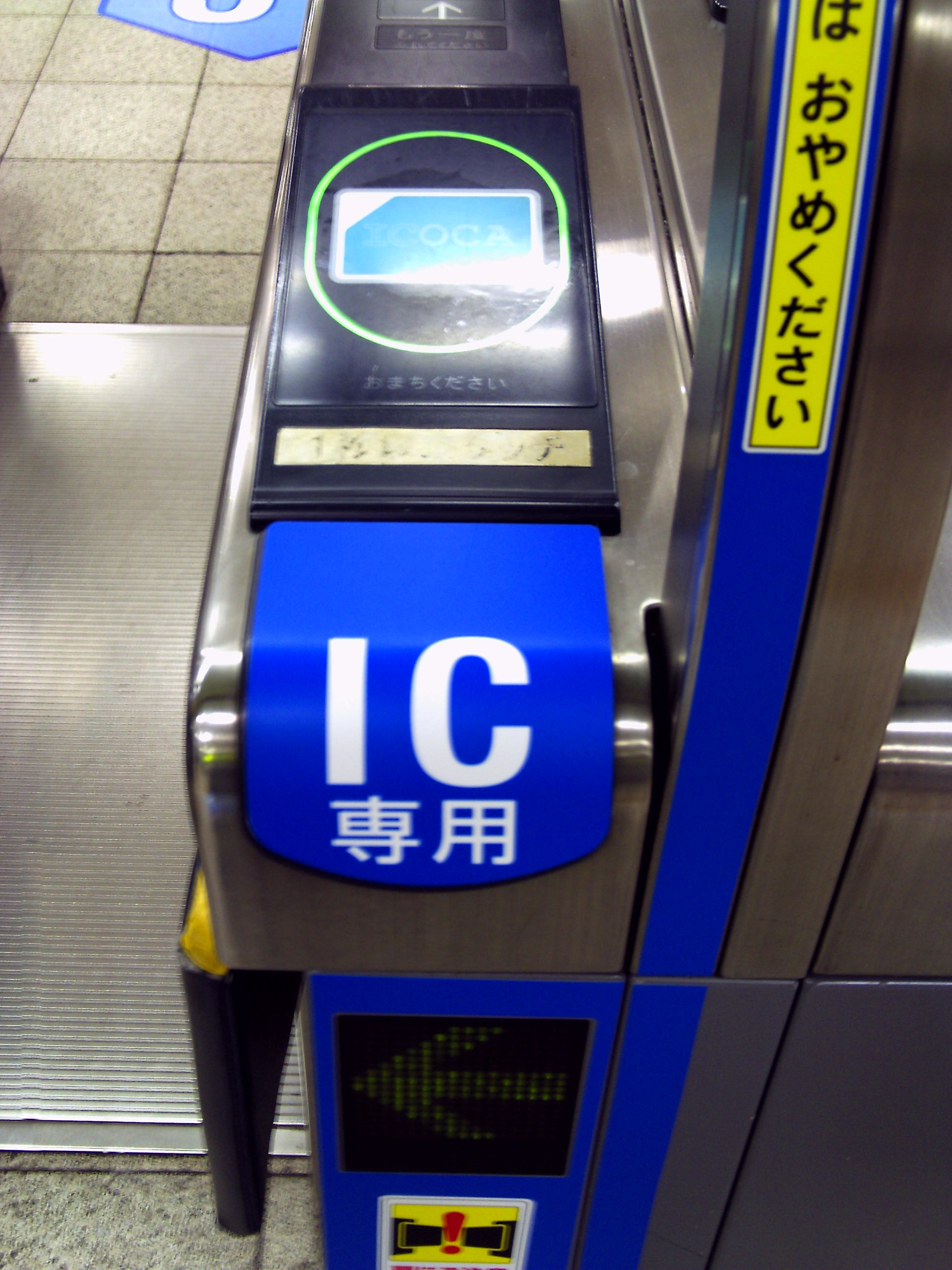
Closeup of an ICOCA gate reader

The balance on the card is displayed when passing through fare gates or inserting it into a ticket vending machine. A travel record is stored on the card, and may be displayed or printed out at fare adjustment or ticket vending machines.

On occasion, when traveling to a station where ICOCA is not supported, the card must be handed over to railway staff at the ticket gate so that they may calculate the fare to deduct, and to provide riders with a transfer slip, which can be given to staff at the next station where ICOCA is used.

ICOCA functions as a boarding ticket (乗車券, jōshaken) also supports commuter pass (定期券, teikiken) functionality. However, for express services, such as the Haruka service to Kansai airport, on which an additional fee is required, ICOCA can only be used as fare ticket (乗車券, jōshaken), for passing the ticket gate, for non-reserved travel, while the express ticket must purchased from the conductor on board the train (see train tickets in Japan).

=== Variants ===
- Standard ICOCA
  - ICOCA定期券 (teikiken) – with commuter pass
  - こどもICOCA (kodomo) – children's ICOCA (discounted fare)
  - こどもICOCA定期券 – children's ICOCA with commuter pass

Cards that are functionally equivalent to the standard ICOCA but with a visually different front design are sold by JR Shikoku, IR Ishikawa Railway, Ainokaze Toyama Railway, and Hapi-Line Fukui.

The KIPS ICOCA variant was formerly sold by Kintetsu Railway between 2012 and 2023. The SMART ICOCA variant, which was able to be recharged via a linked credit card, was also formerly available from JR West between 2006 and 2024.

== Interoperation ==
Interoperation map

Since March 2013, ICOCA has been part of Japan's Nationwide Mutual Usage Service, allowing it to be used in major cities across the country. Prior to this system of interoperability between the 10 IC cards, a number of bilateral partnerships were formed with other companies and operators:

- On August 1, 2004, in a reciprocal agreement with JR East, ICOCA became usable in the Tokyo-Kantō area. Conversely, JR East's Suica became usable on JR West rail services.
- On January 21, 2006, ICOCA became usable at all locations accepting Osaka PiTaPa smart cards.
- On September 1, 2007, ICOCA became usable in the Hiroshima and Okayama areas, in agreement with local transit operators.
- On March 29, 2008, in a reciprocal agreement with JR Central, ICOCA became usable in the Nagoya metropolitan area. Similarly, JR Central's TOICA became usable on JR West rail services.
- On March 5, 2011, in a reciprocal agreement with JR Kyushu, ICOCA became usable in the Fukuoka–Saga area. Similarly, JR Kyushu's SUGOCA became usable on JR West rail services.
- On June 1, 2011, ICOCA became usable on Keihan lines.
- On March 17, 2012, ICOCA became usable in some stations of JR Shikoku, such as in the Takamatsu area.
- On December 1, 2012, ICOCA became usable on Kintetsu lines.

== Retail ==
These cards are available at card vending machines at the train stations. Cards cost 2000 yen, which includes a 500 yen deposit that will be returned if the card is returned. The remaining 1500 yen is immediately available for use on transit, and more money can be charged on to the card at similar ticket vending machines or fare adjustment machines inside each station.

Cards may only be returned in JR West stations, meaning that travelers who start their trip in JR West's service area and finish their trip elsewhere may not be able to return it before departure. Shikoku ICOCA are sold at several stations in Shikoku and can only be returned at those stations, and feature a special design.

== Technology ==
The card incorporates contactless RFID technology developed by Sony called FeliCa. The same technology is also deployed in other IC cards across Japan, in Edy electronic cash cards, and in the Octopus card in Hong Kong.

== Mobile devices ==
A version for mobile phones known as Mobile ICOCA (モバイルICOCA, Mobairu Ikoka), which uses Mobile FeliCa and Osaifu-Keitai functionality, was launched in March 2023.

== See also ==
- Mass transit systems
- Electronic money
- List of smart cards
