= Uji Station (JR West) =

Railway station in Uji, Kyoto Prefecture, Japan

Uji Station 宇治駅
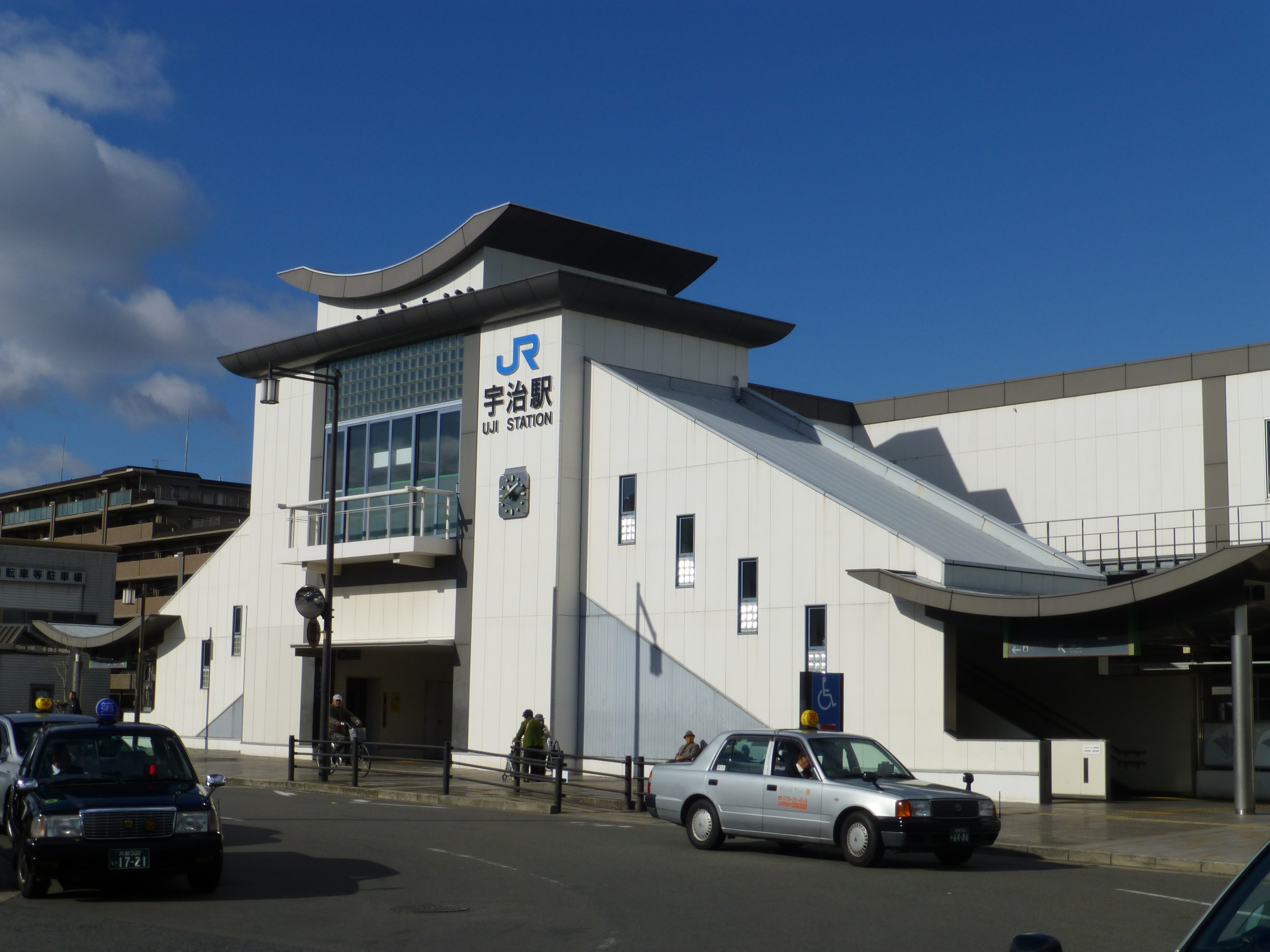
- Uji Station in December 2015

General information
- Location: 16, Uji-Umonji, Uji, Kyoto （京都府宇治市宇治宇文字16） Japan
- Coordinates: 34°53′25.45″N 135°48′2.19″E
- Operator: JR West
- Line: D Nara Line
- Platforms: 2 island platforms
- Tracks: 4

Construction
- Structure type: Ground level
- Accessible: None

Other information
- Station code: JR-D09
- Website: Official website

History
- Opened: 1896

Passengers
- FY 2023: 16,366 daily
Location
- Location within Kyoto Prefecture Location within Japan

Uji Station (宇治駅, Uji-eki) is a train station located on the Nara Line in Uji, Kyoto Prefecture, Japan, operated by West Japan Railway Company (JR West). This station administrates all intermediate stations on the Nara Line. It has the station number "JR-D09".

== Layout ==
Originally, there was a side platform and an island platform serving three tracks. Both these and the station building were at ground level. The station was rebuilt in 2000 with two island platforms serving four tracks and a new station building designed imitating the Phoenix Hall of Byōdō-in, a major tourist attraction in Uji.

=== Platforms ===
1, 2	■ Nara Line	for Kyoto
3, 4	■ Nara Line	for Kizu and Nara

== History ==
Station numbering was introduced in March 2018 with Uji being assigned station number JR-D09.

== Passenger statistics ==
According to the Kyoto Prefecture statistical report, the average number of passengers per day is as follows.

Year	Passengers
1999	5,828
2000	5,773
2001	6,241
2002	6,438
2003	6,645
2004	6,753
2005	6,975
2006	7,173
2007	7,361
2008	7,731
2009	7,578
2010	7,658
2011	7,743
2012	7,684
2013	7,616
2014	8,370
2015	8,604
2016	8,362

== Adjacent stations ==
«	Service	»
Nara Line
Ōbaku	Local	JR Ogura
Rokujizō	Regional Rapid Service	JR Ogura
Rokujizō	Rapid Service	JR Ogura
Rokujizō	Miyakoji Rapid Service	Jōyō

== Surrounding area ==
- Uji City Hall
- Byōdō-in
- Agata Shrine
- Ujigami Shrine
- Uji Bridge
- Uji Station (Keihan Railway Uji Line)
