= Obaku =

Ōbaku (黄檗 Japanese Ōbaku, pinyin Huángbò) is the Amur Corktree. It may refer to:

- Mount Huangbo (Chinese: 黄檗山), a mountain in China's Fujian province, noted for its Buddhist temples
- Mount Ōbaku (黄檗山, Ōbaku-san), a mountain in the city of Uji in Japan
- Huangbo Xiyun (黄檗希運), a Chinese Chan Buddhist master
- The Japanese Ōbaku School (黄檗宗) of Zen Buddhism
- Ōbaku Station (Keihan)・Ōbaku Station (JR West), train stations in Uji, Japan

Obaku may also refer to:

- Obaku, Nigeria, a village
