= Momoyama-minamiguchi Station =

Railway station in Kyoto, Japan

Coordinates: 34.9309°N 135.7838°E

Momoyama-minamiguchi Station 桃山南口駅
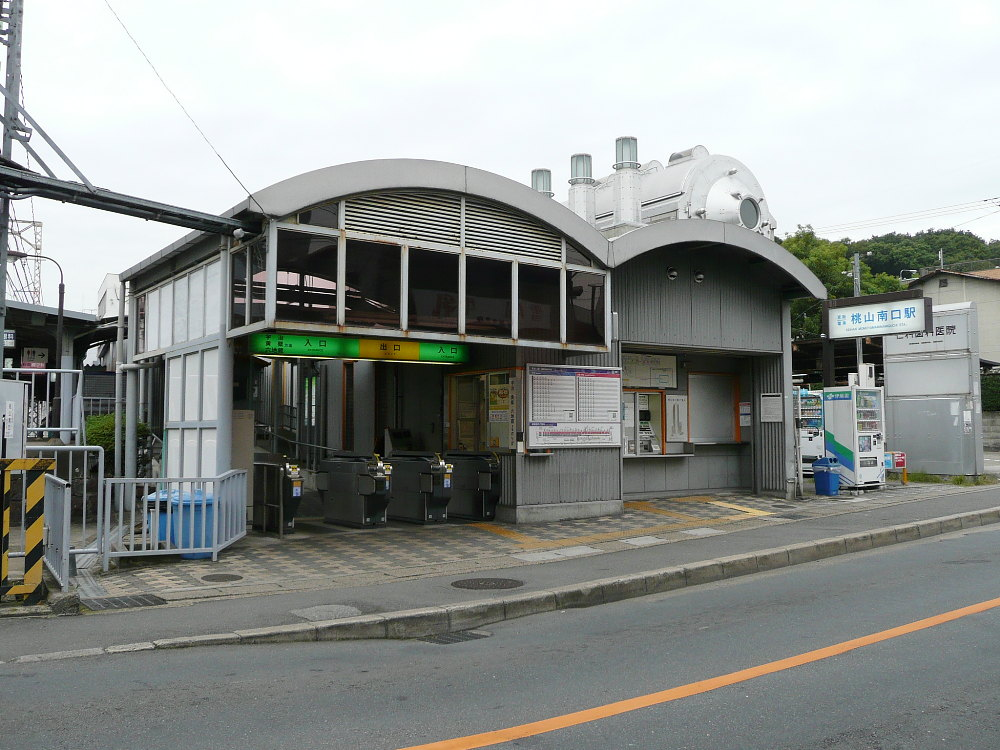
- Station building attached to Uji-bound platform

General information
- Location: Fushimi, Kyoto, Kyoto; Japan
- Operator: Keihan Railway
- Line: Uji Line

History
- Opened: 1913
- Former names: Goryōmae (until 1949)

Passengers
- FY2015: 2.1 million

Services
Preceding station	Keihan Electric Railway	Following station
Kangetsukyō towards Chūshojima	Uji Line	Rokujizō towards Uji
Location

Momoyama-minamiguchi Station (桃山南口駅, Momoyama-minamiguchi-eki) is a train station located in Fushimi-ku, Kyoto, Kyoto Prefecture, Japan.

== Lines ==
- Keihan Electric Railway
  - Uji Line

== History ==
The station opened on June 1, 1913, simultaneously with the opening of the Uji Line. The station name was changed from Goryōmae Station (御陵前駅, Goryōmae-eki) in 1949.
