= Mimurodo Station =

Railway station in Uji, Kyoto Prefecture, Japan

Coordinates: 34.8992°N 135.8064°E

Mimurodo Station (三室戸駅, Mimurodo-eki) is a train station located in Uji, Kyoto Prefecture, Japan. The station is a 20-minute walk from the Mimurotoji temple.

== Lines ==
- Keihan Electric Railway
  - Uji Line

== Adjacent stations ==
Preceding station	Keihan Electric Railway	Following station
Ōbaku towards Chūshojima	Uji Line	Uji Terminus

== Gallery ==
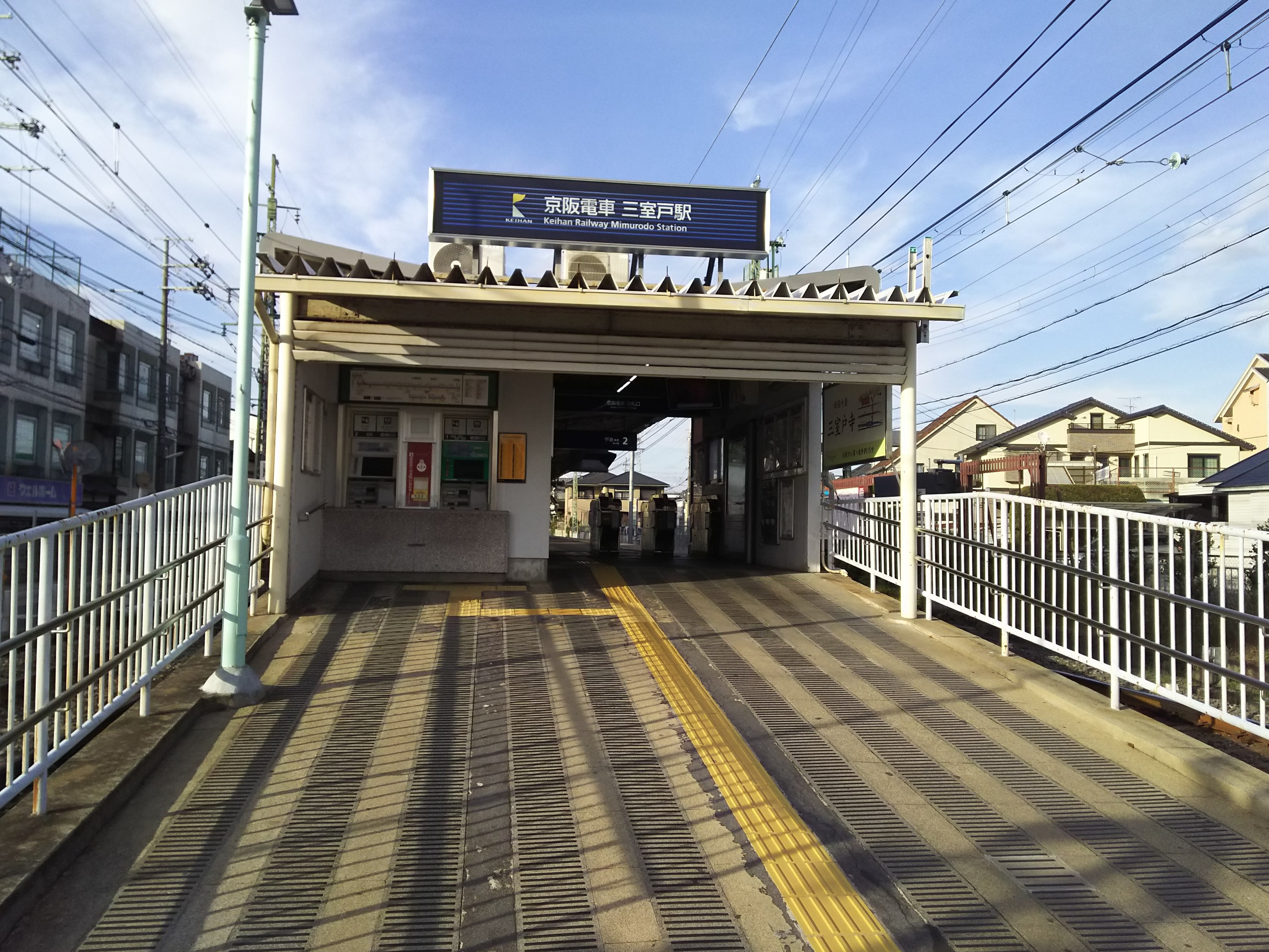
Entrance

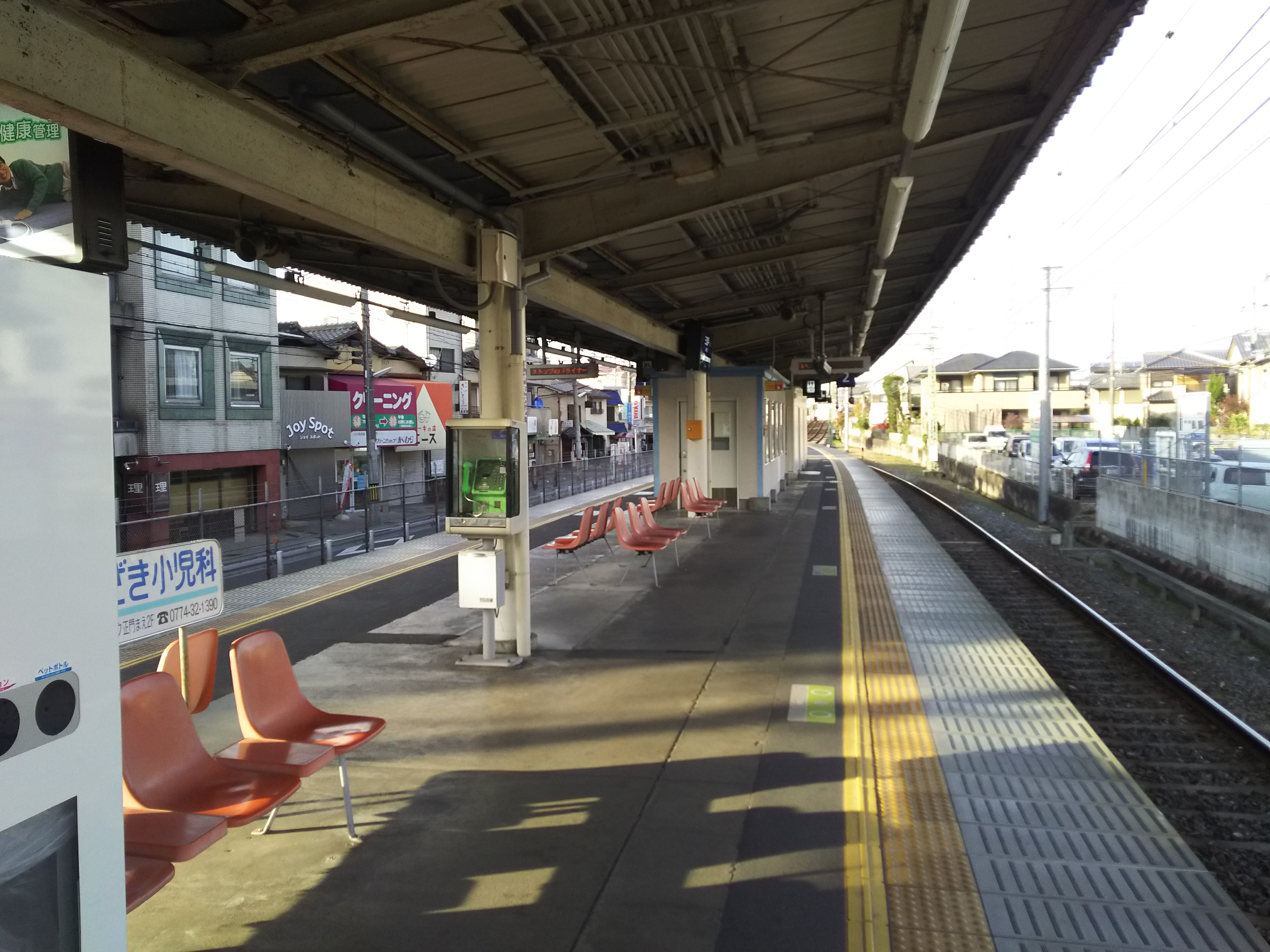
Platform

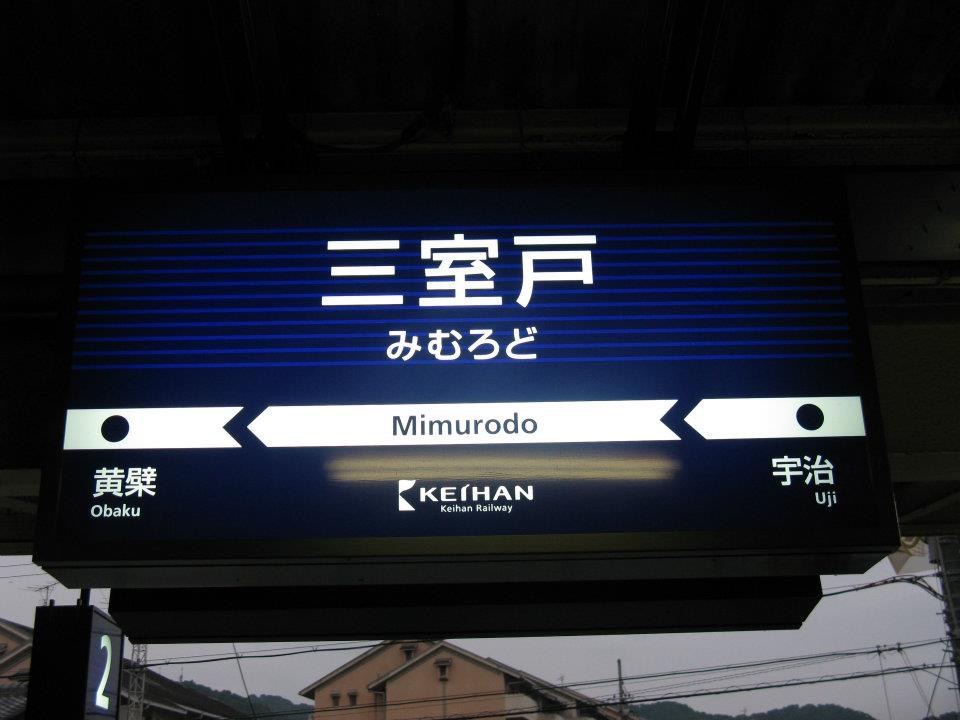
Sign

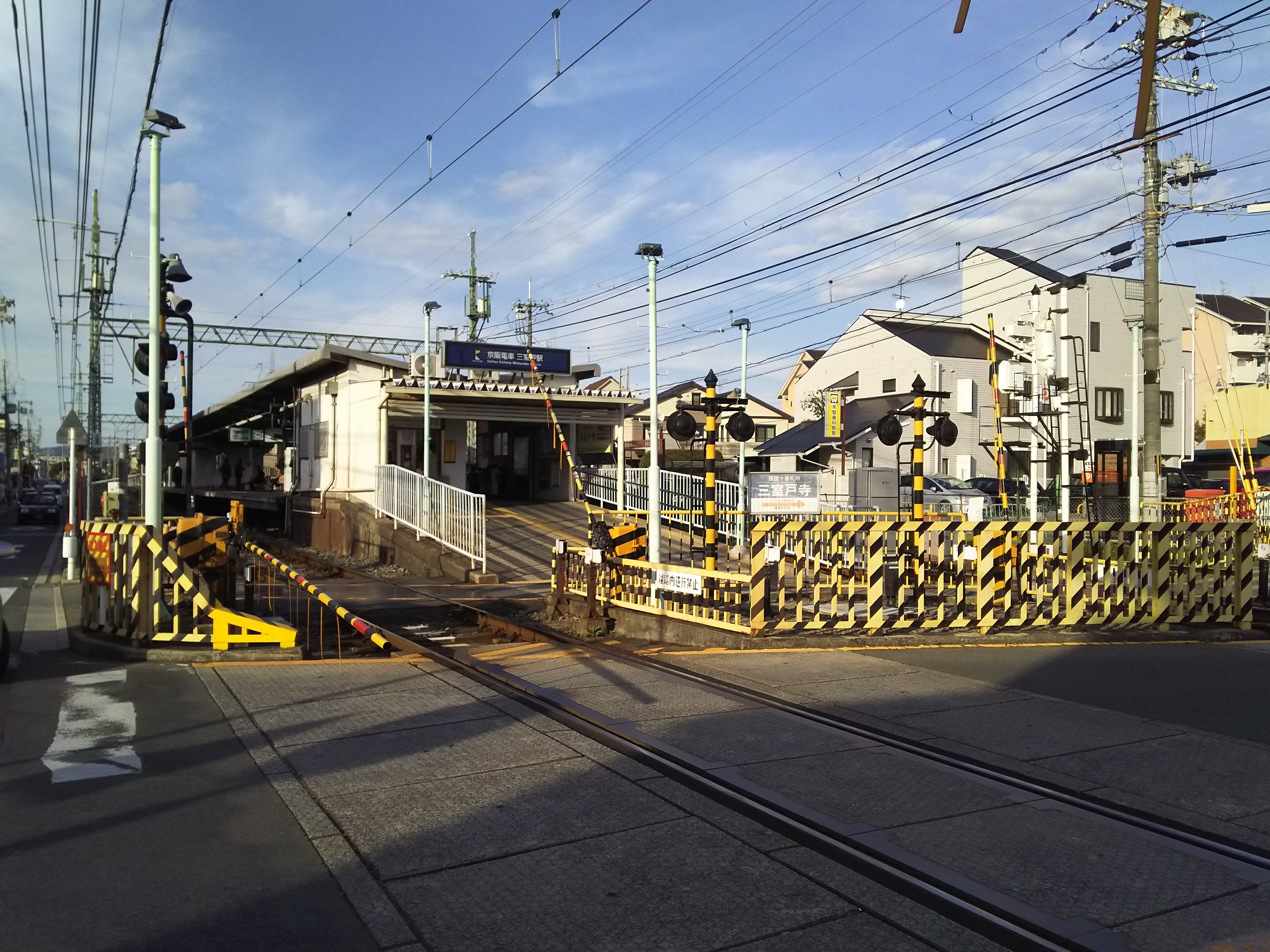
Adjacent crossing
