= Ōbaku Station (Keihan) =

Railway station in Uji, Kyoto Prefecture, Japan

Ōbaku Station 黄檗駅
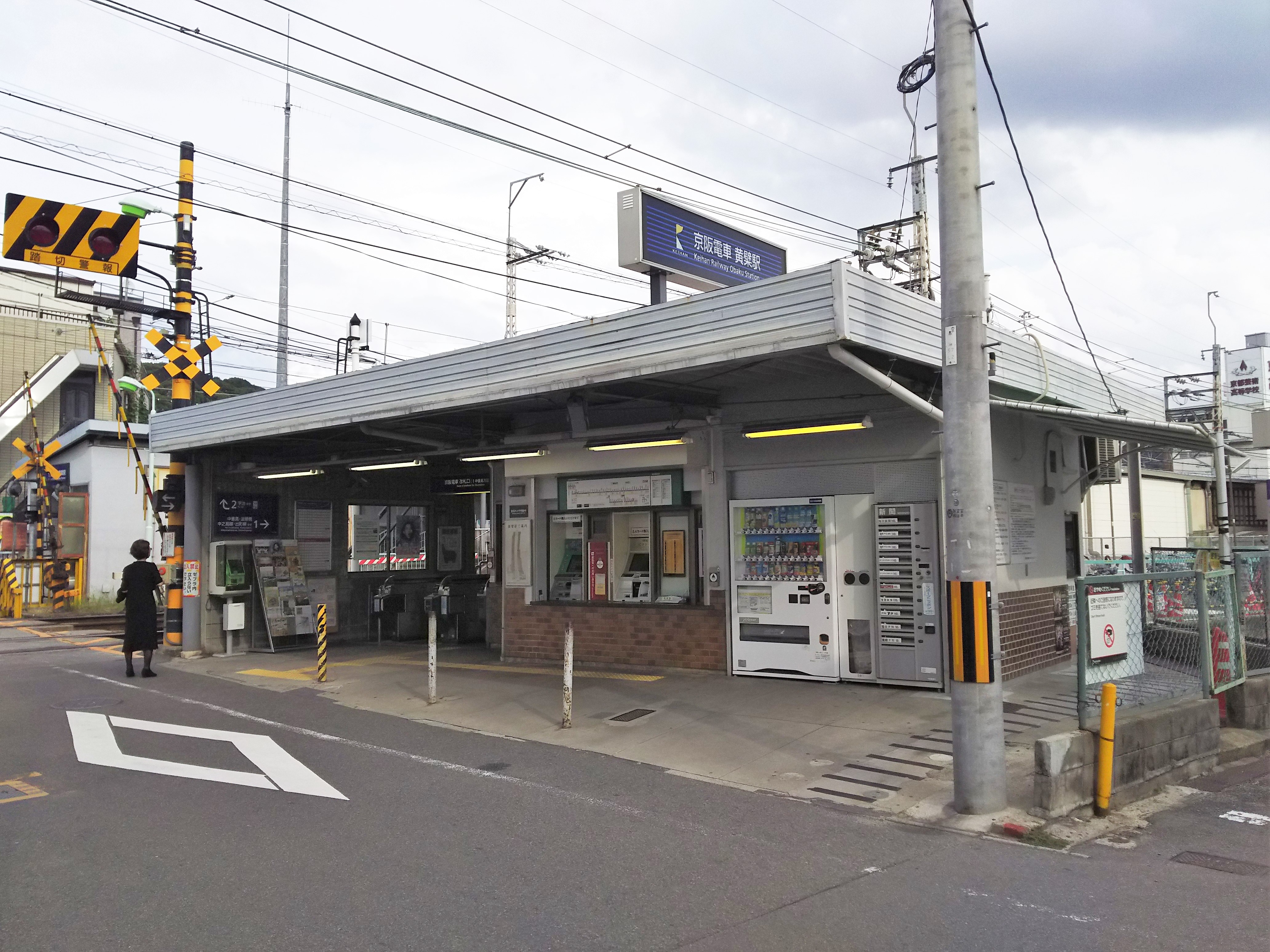
- Entrance building of Keihan Obaku

General information
- Location: Uji, Kyoto Prefecture; Japan
- Coordinates: 34.9133°N 135.8032°E
- Operator: Keihan Electric Railway
- Line: ■ Uji Line

Other information
- Station code: KH75

Passengers
- FY 2023: 4,094 (Keihan)

Services
Preceding station	Keihan Electric Railway	Following station
Kowata towards Chūshojima	Uji Line	Mimurodo towards Uji
Location
- Location within Kyoto Prefecture Location within Japan

Ōbaku Station (黄檗駅, Ōbaku-eki) is a train station located in Uji, Kyoto Prefecture, Japan, operated by Keihan Electric Railway. It has the station number "KH75".

== Lines ==
Ōbaku Station is served by the Keihan Uji Line.

== Layout ==
The Keihan station has two side platforms serving one track each.

=== Platforms ===
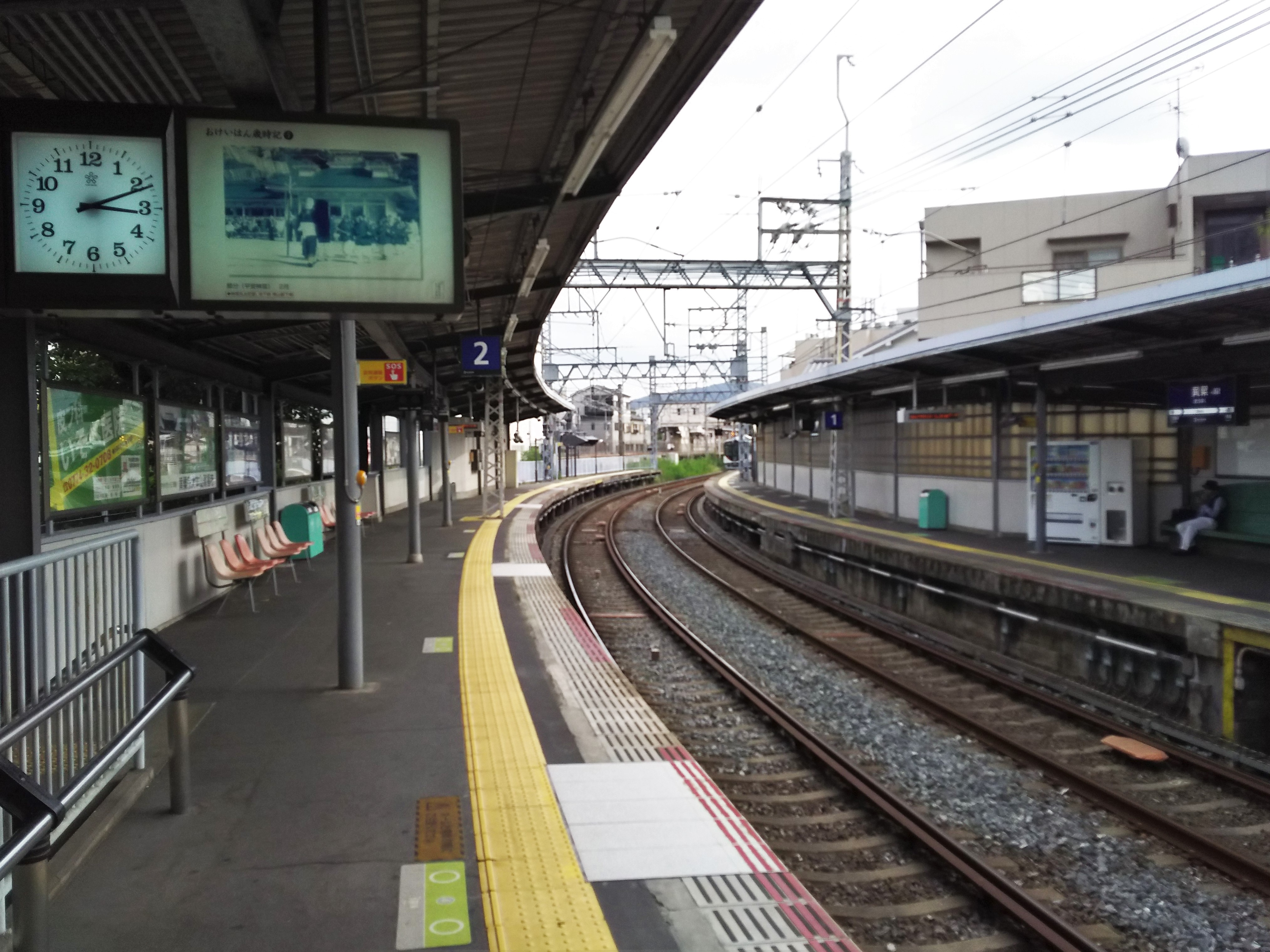
Keihan Obaku platform

1	■ Uji Line	for Chushojima
2	■ Uji Line	for Uji

== Passenger statistics ==
According to Kyoto Prefecture statistics, the average number of passengers per day is as follows.

year	Passengers
1999	3,855
2000	3,945
2001	3,860
2002	3,814
2003	3,716
2004	3,633
2005	3,556
2006	3,441
2007	3,402
2008	3,436
2009	3,392
2010	3,400
2011	3,311
2012	3,403
2013	3,353
2014	3,353
2015	3,459
2016	2,757

== Surrounding area ==
- Kyoto University Uji Campus
