= Kowata Station =

Railway station in Uji, Kyoto Prefecture, Japan

Coordinates: 34°55′32.39″N 135°47′46.07″E

Kowata Station 木幡駅
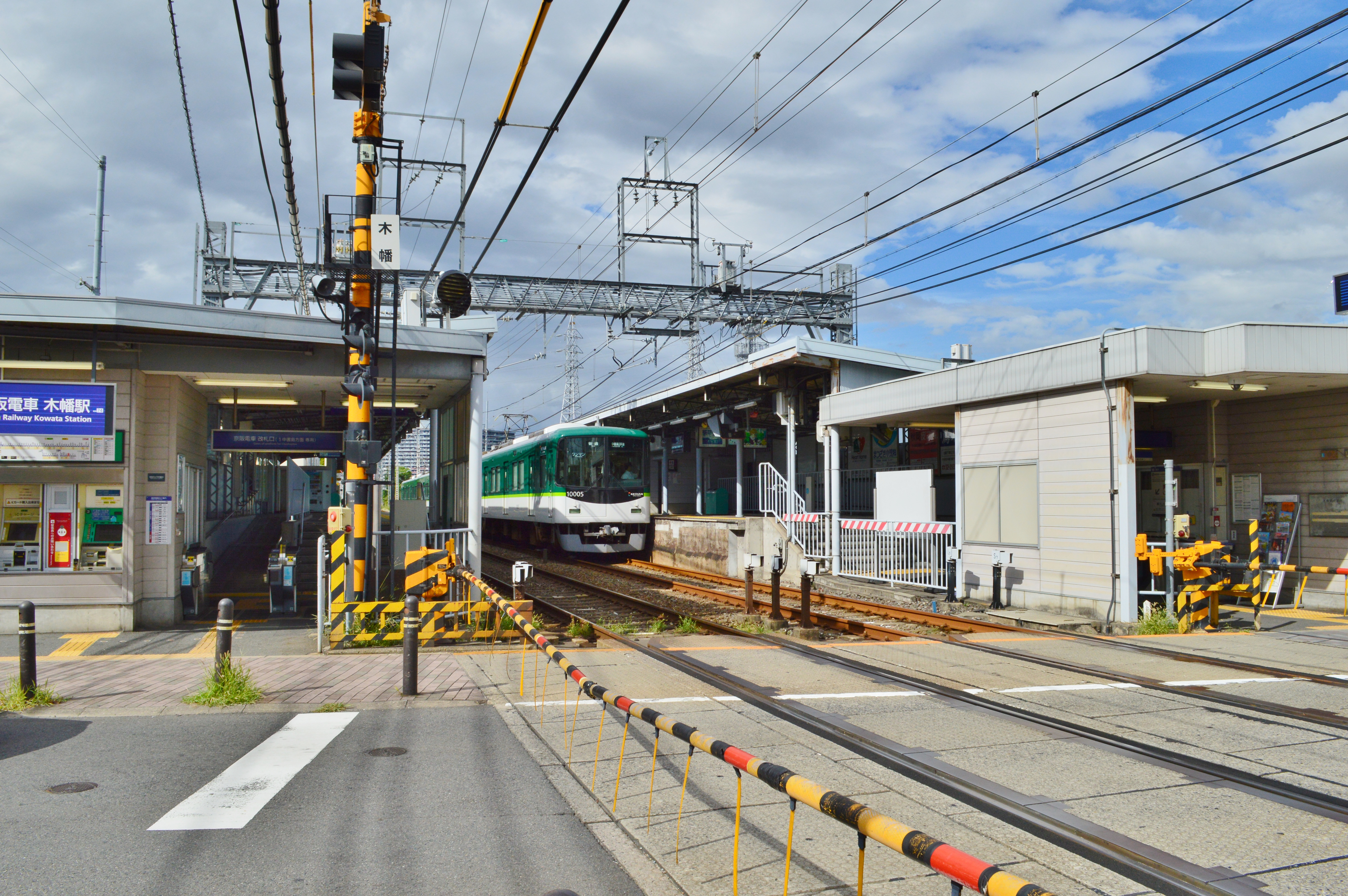
- Station entrance and platform (September 2016)

General information
- Location: Nishinaka Kohata, Uji, Kyoto 611-0002; Japan
- Operated by: Keihan Electric Railway
- Line: Keihan Uji Line
- Distance: 3.9km (2.4mi) from Chūshojima
- Platforms: 2
- Tracks: 2
- Connections: Nara Line (Kohata Station) (not an official connection)

Other information
- Station code: 木

History
- Opened: June 1, 1913; 112 years ago

Services
Preceding station	Keihan Electric Railway	Following station
Rokujizō towards Chūshojima	Uji Line	Ōbaku towards Uji
Location

Kowata Station (木幡駅, Kowata-eki) is a train station located in Uji, Kyoto Prefecture, Japan, on the Keihan Electric Railway Uji Line.

== Layout ==
The station has two side platforms.

1	■ Uji Line	for Chushojima
2	■ Uji Line	for Uji

== Surroundings ==
- Panasonic Electronic Devices Co., Ltd. (Capacitor Business Unit)
- Kohata Shrine
- Kyoto Animation Studio 2
