= 木幡駅 =

木幡駅 is the name of multiple train stations in Japan:

- Kobata Station
- Kohata Station
- Kowata Station
