= Hirakata-kōen Station =

Railway station in Hirakata, Osaka Prefecture, Japan

Hirakata-kōen Station 枚方公園駅
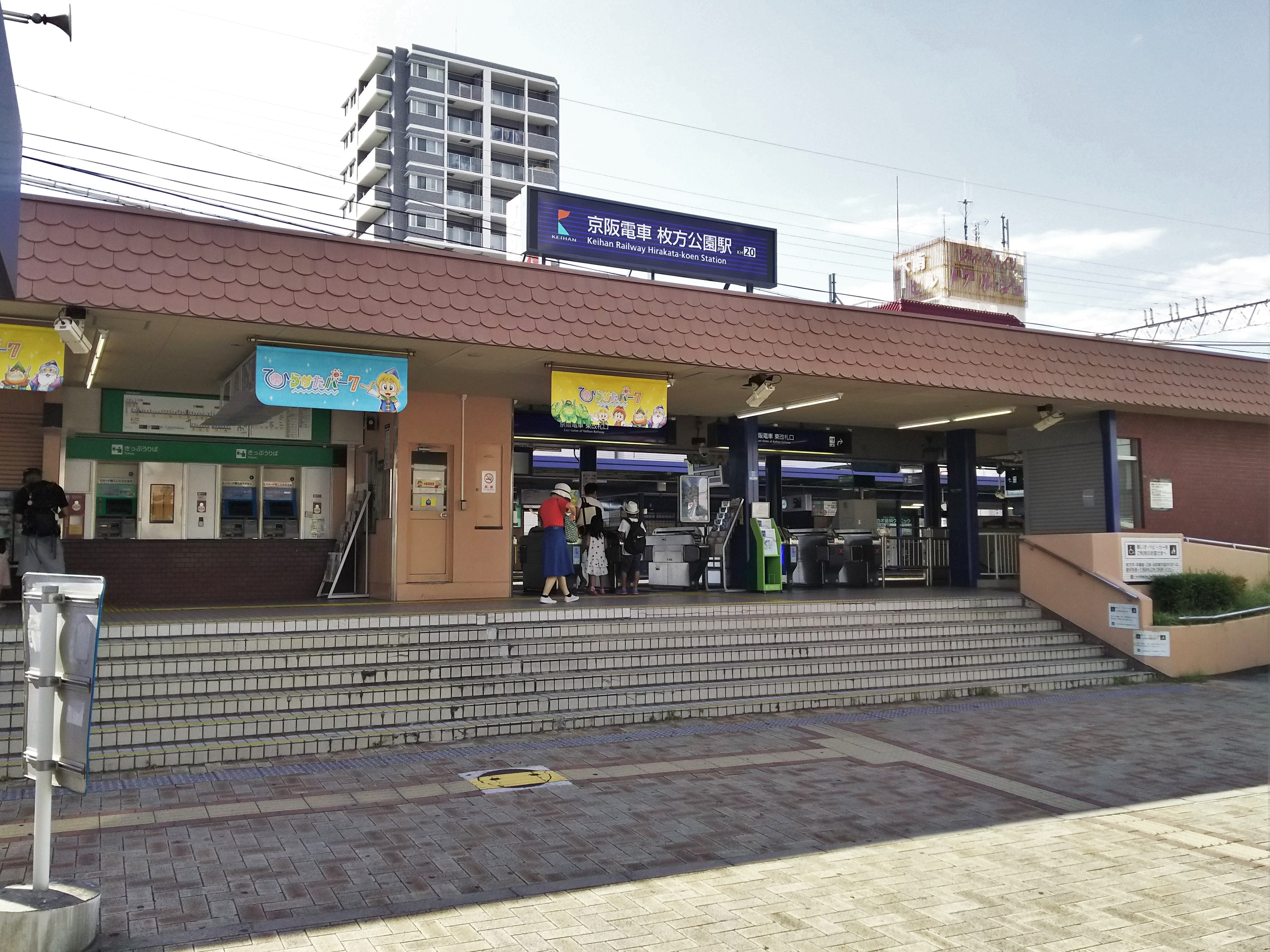
- Hirakata-kōen Station, August 2016

General information
- Location: Ikaga-higashimachi, Hirakata-shi, Osaka-fu 573-0058; Japan
- Coordinates: 34°48′40.31″N 135°38′21.83″E
- Operator: Keihan Electric Railway
- Line: ■ Keihan Main Line
- Distance: 20.8 km from Yodoyabashi
- Platforms: 2 side platforms
- Connections: Bus stop

Other information
- Status: Staffed
- Station code: KH20
- Website: Official website

History
- Opened: 15 April 1910
- Former names: Hirakata (until 1949)

Passengers
- FY2019: 20,741 daily
Location
- Location within Osaka Prefecture Location within Japan

Hirakata-kōen Station (枚方公園駅, Hirakata-kōen-eki) is a passenger railway station in located in the city of Hirakata, Osaka Prefecture, Japan, operated by the private railway company Keihan Electric Railway.

== Lines ==
Hirakata-kōen Station is served by the Keihan Main Line, and is located 20.8 km from the starting point of the line at Yodoyabashi Station.

== Station layout ==
The station has two ground-level opposed side platforms connected by an underground passage.

=== Platforms ===
1, 2	■ Keihan Main Line	for Hirakatashi, Chushojima, Sanjo and Demachiyanagi
3, 4	■ Keihan Main Line	for Kyobashi, Yodoyabashi and Nakanoshima

== Adjacent stations ==
«	Service	»
Keihan Railway Keihan Main Line
Kōzenji	Local	Hirakatashi
Kōzenji	Semi-express	Hirakatashi
Kōzenji	Sub-express	Hirakatashi
Kōzenji	Commuter Sub Express (only running for Yodoyabashi or Nakanoshima on weekday mornings)	Hirakatashi
Kōrien	Express	Hirakatashi
Midnight Express (only running for Kuzuha): Does not stop at this station
Rapid Express: Does not stop at this station
Commuter Rapid Express (only running for Yodoyabashi or Nakanoshima on weekday mornings): Does not stop at this station
Limited Express: Does not stop at this station

== History ==
The station was opened on 15 April 1910 as Hirakata Station (枚方駅, Hirakata-eki). It was renamed to its present name on 1 October 1949.

== Future plans ==
The facilities are expected to be moved to a new elevated station by 2028. Construction has been in progress since September 2022.

== Passenger statistics ==
In fiscal 2019, the station was used by an average of 20,741 passengers daily.

== Surrounding area ==
- Hirakata Park
- Japan National Route 170 (Hirakata Ohashi)
- Hirakata Municipal Hirakata Elementary School

== See also ==
- List of railway stations in Japan
