= Kōzenji Station =

Railway station in Hirakata, Osaka Prefecture, Japan

Kōzenji Station 光善寺駅
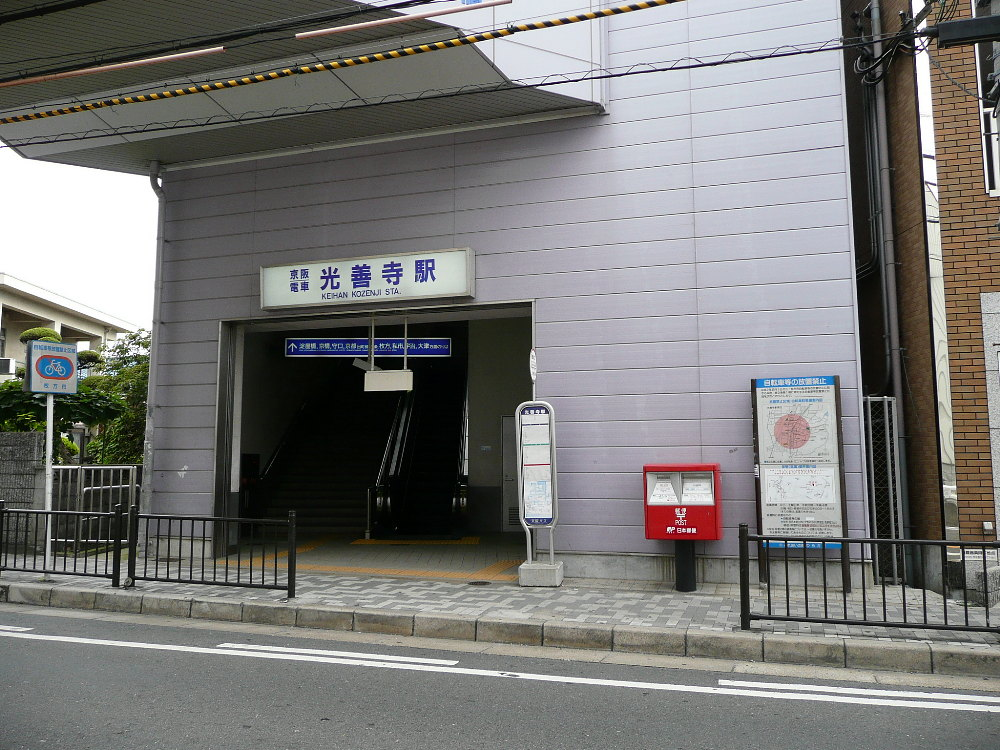
- Kōzenji Station, October 2007

General information
- Location: 1-9 Kitanakaburi, Hirakata-shi, Osaka-fu 573-0064; Japan
- Coordinates: 34°47′52.51″N 135°37′48.8″E
- Operator: Keihan Electric Railway
- Line: ■ Keihan Main Line
- Distance: 19.1 km from Yodoyabashi
- Platforms: 2 side platforms
- Connections: Bus terminal

Other information
- Status: Staffed
- Station code: KH19
- Website: Official website

History
- Opened: 15 December 1910

Passengers
- FY2019: 21,799 daily
Location
- Location within Osaka Prefecture Location within Japan

Kōzenji Station (光善寺駅, Kōzenji-eki) is a passenger railway station in located in the city of Hirakata, Osaka Prefecture, Japan, operated by the private railway company Keihan Electric Railway.

== Lines ==
Kōzenji Station is served by the Keihan Main Line, and is located 19.1 km from the starting point of the line at Yodoyabashi Station.

== Station layout ==
The station has two ground-level opposed side platforms connected by an elevated station building.

=== Platforms ===
1	■ Keihan Main Line	for Hirakatashi, Chushojima, Sanjo and Demachiyanagi
2	■ Keihan Main Line	for Kyobashi, Yodoyabashi and Nakanoshima

== Adjacent stations ==
«	Service	»
Keihan Railway Keihan Main Line
Kōrien	Local	Hirakata-kōen
Kōrien	Semi-express	Hirakata-kōen
Kōrien	Sub-express	Hirakata-kōen
Kōrien	Commuter Sub Express (only running for Yodoyabashi or Nakanoshima on weekday mornings)	Hirakata-kōen
Express: Does not stop at this station
Midnight Express (only running for Kuzuha): Does not stop at this station
Rapid Express: Does not stop at this station
Commuter Rapid Express (only running for Yodoyabashi or Nakanoshima on weekday mornings): Does not stop at this station
Limited Express: Does not stop at this station

== History ==
The station was opened on 15 December 1910.

== Future plans ==
The facilities are expected to be moved to a new elevated station by 2028. Construction has been in progress since September 2022.

== Passenger statistics ==
In fiscal 2019, the station was used by an average of 21,799 passengers daily.

== Surrounding area ==
- Kozenji Temple
- Hirakata Municipal Sada Junior High School Lifelong Learning Center
- Hirakata Municipal Library
- Yoshida Hospital (7 minutes walk)

== See also ==
- List of railway stations in Japan
