= Rokujizō Station =

Rokujizō Station (六地蔵駅) is the name of train stations in Japan:

- Rokujizō Station (Keihan)
- Rokujizō Station (JR West)
