= Uji Station =

Uji Station (宇治駅) is the name of two train stations in Japan:

- Uji Station (JR West)
- Uji Station (Keihan)
