= Kangetsukyō Station =

Railway station in Kyoto, Japan

Kangetsukyō Station 観月橋駅
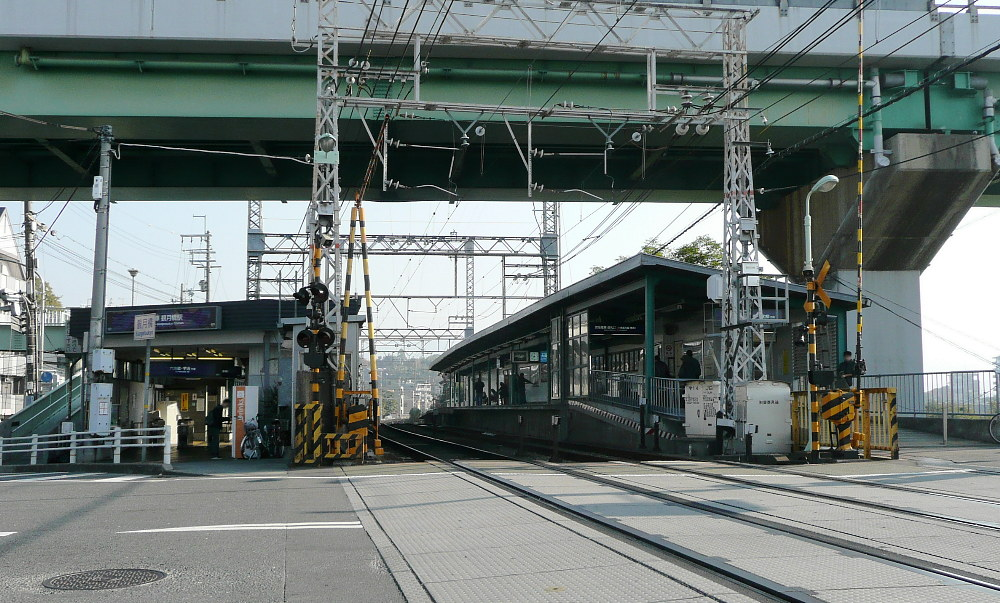
- Kangetsukyō Station

General information
- Location: Fushimi-ku, Kyoto; Kyoto Prefecture; Japan
- Coordinates: 34.9284°N 135.7688°E
- Operator: Keihan Electric Railway
- Line: Keihan Main Line
- Distance: 0.7 km from Chūshojima
- Platforms: 2
- Tracks: 2

Construction
- Structure type: At-grade

Other information
- Station code: KH71
- Website: Official (in Japanese)

History
- Opened: 1913

Passengers
- FY2015: 2.0 million

Services
Preceding station	Keihan Electric Railway	Following station
Chūshojima Terminus	Uji Line	Momoyama-minamiguchi towards Uji
Location

Kangetsukyō Station (観月橋駅, Kangetsukyō-eki) is a train station located in Fushimi-ku, Kyoto, Kyoto Prefecture, Japan.

== Lines ==
- Keihan Electric Railway
  - Uji Line

== Layout ==
The station has two side platforms serving two tracks.
