= Tsuen Tea =

Tea house in Uji, Kyoto, Japan

Coordinates: 34.8932899°N 135.8069955°E

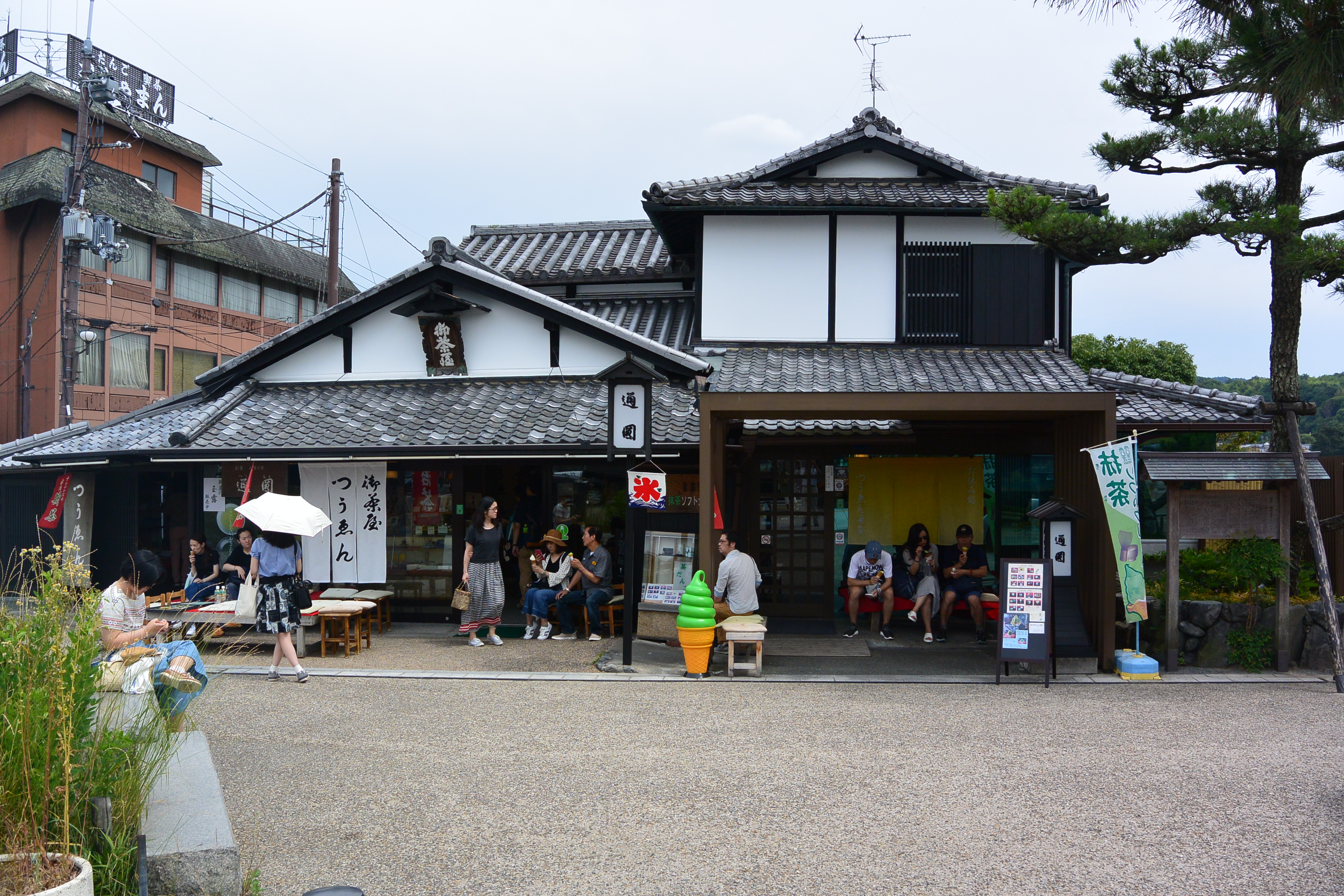
The current Tsuen tea shop and teahouse, built in 1672

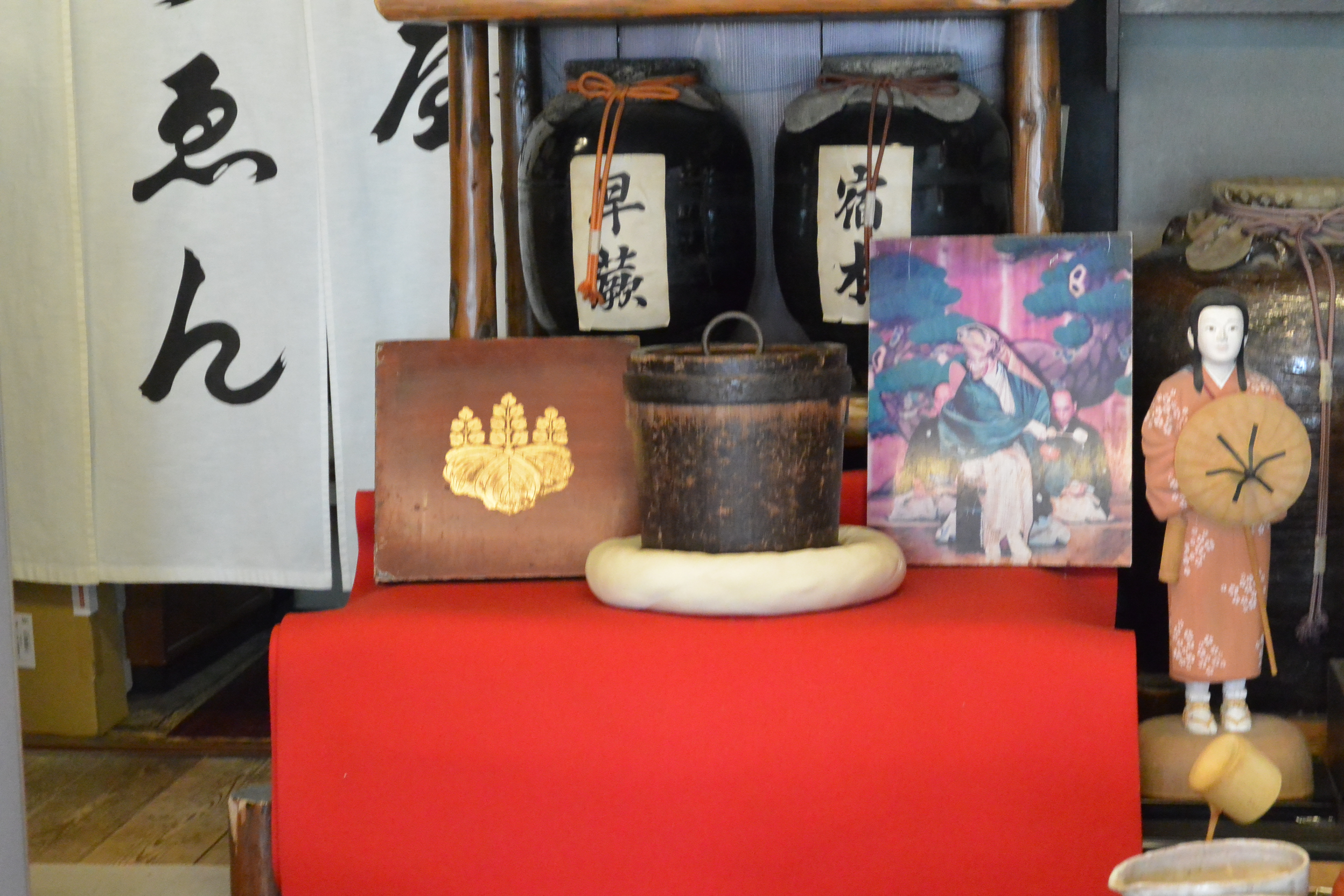
Well bucket made by Sen no Rikyū on display in the shop (June 2017)

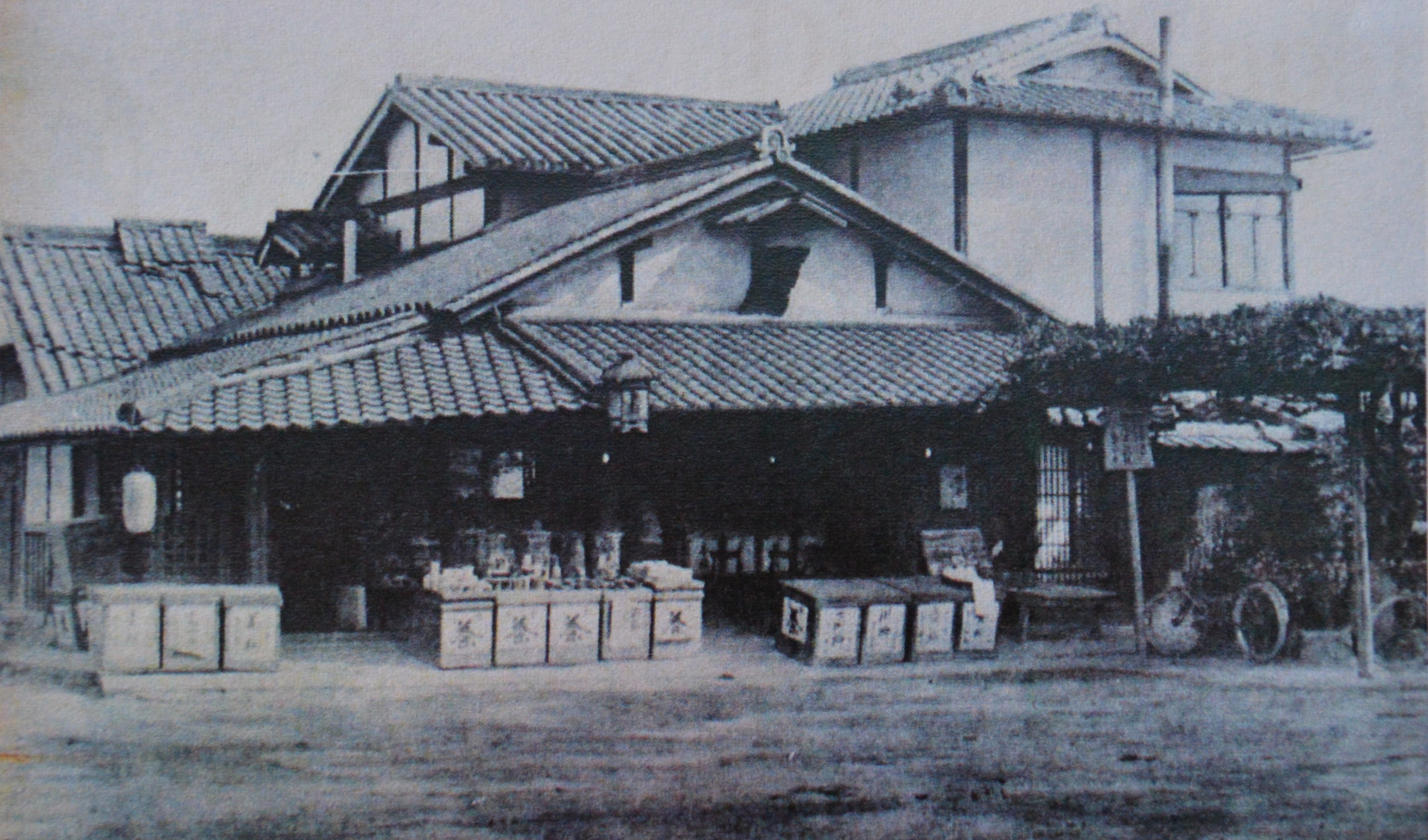
Exterior in or around the 1930s

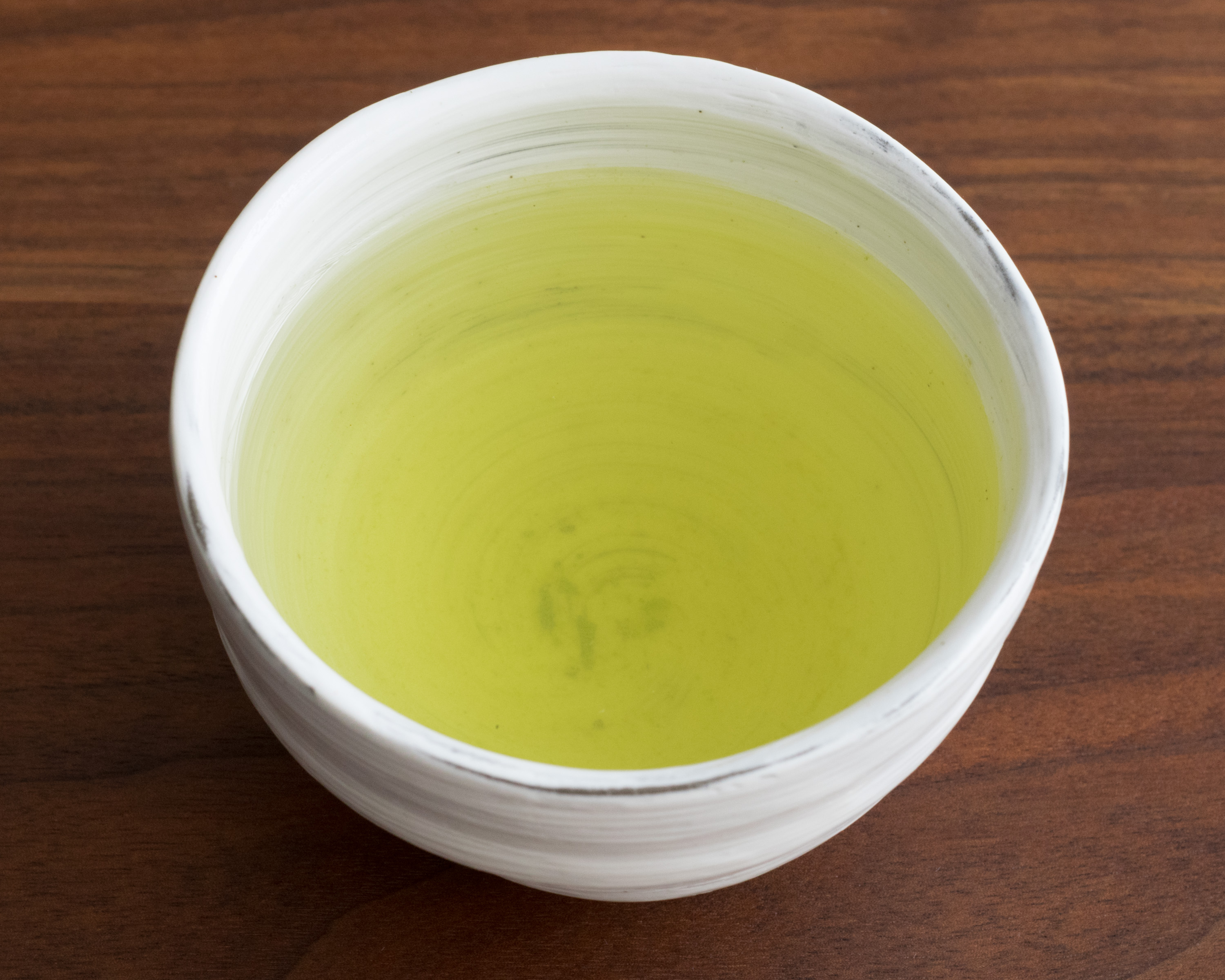
Lightly-steamed sencha tea from Tsuen Tea

Tsuen Tea (通圓, Tsūen) is the oldest tea house in Japan, founded in 1160 in Uji city, Kyoto Prefecture, Japan. It is also the 13th oldest company in Japan, and the 30th oldest in the world, appearing on the List of oldest companies. Located across from Uji Station on the Keihan Uji line, just east of Uji Bridge (originally constructed in 646), successive generations of Tsuen owners provided tea to travelers as "bridge guardians." The shop is the subject of a Kyōgen farce called "Tsuen" and also appears in Eiji Yoshikawa's epic novel Musashi. Today it is operated by the 24th generation of the Tsuen family.

== History ==
The founder of Tsuen was Furukawa Unai, a samurai vassal of Minamoto no Yorimasa. After retiring in his later years, Furukawa adopted the last character of his master's name (政 Masa), and called himself Tsuen Masahisa (通圓政久). He became a monk and took up residence at the east end of Uji Bridge. His descendants carried on the Tsuen surname, serving as guardians of Uji Bridge, by praying for the durability of the bridge as well as the safety and health of the people who used it. As part of this role, they also served tea to travelers. Various historical figures have been recorded as having tea at Tsuen, including the shoguns Ashikaga Yoshimasa, Toyotomi Hideyoshi, and Tokugawa Ieyasu.

== Building ==
The current building incorporates the remains of a merchant residence built in 1672. Viewed from the front, it has overhanging eaves with a wide frontage and few support pillars. This method of construction is from the early Edo period, and makes it easy for people to come and go from the shop. Inside the entrance there is a display of ceramic tea jars that are several hundred years old, along with a small wooden statue of the Tsuen founder presented by Ikkyū Oshō. A wooden well bucket reputed to have been made by Sen no Rikyū can also be seen.

== Main products ==
Today, the shop sells tea products including the following:

- matcha - ground green tea
- gyokuro - shaded green tea
- sencha - whole tea leaves infused in hot water
- karigane - contains also twigs of the tea tree
- hōjicha - roasted green tea
- genmaicha - mixed low - level green tea and roasted brown rice.

== See also ==
- Japanese tea ceremony
- List of oldest companies
