= Keihan Uji Line =

Railway line in Japan

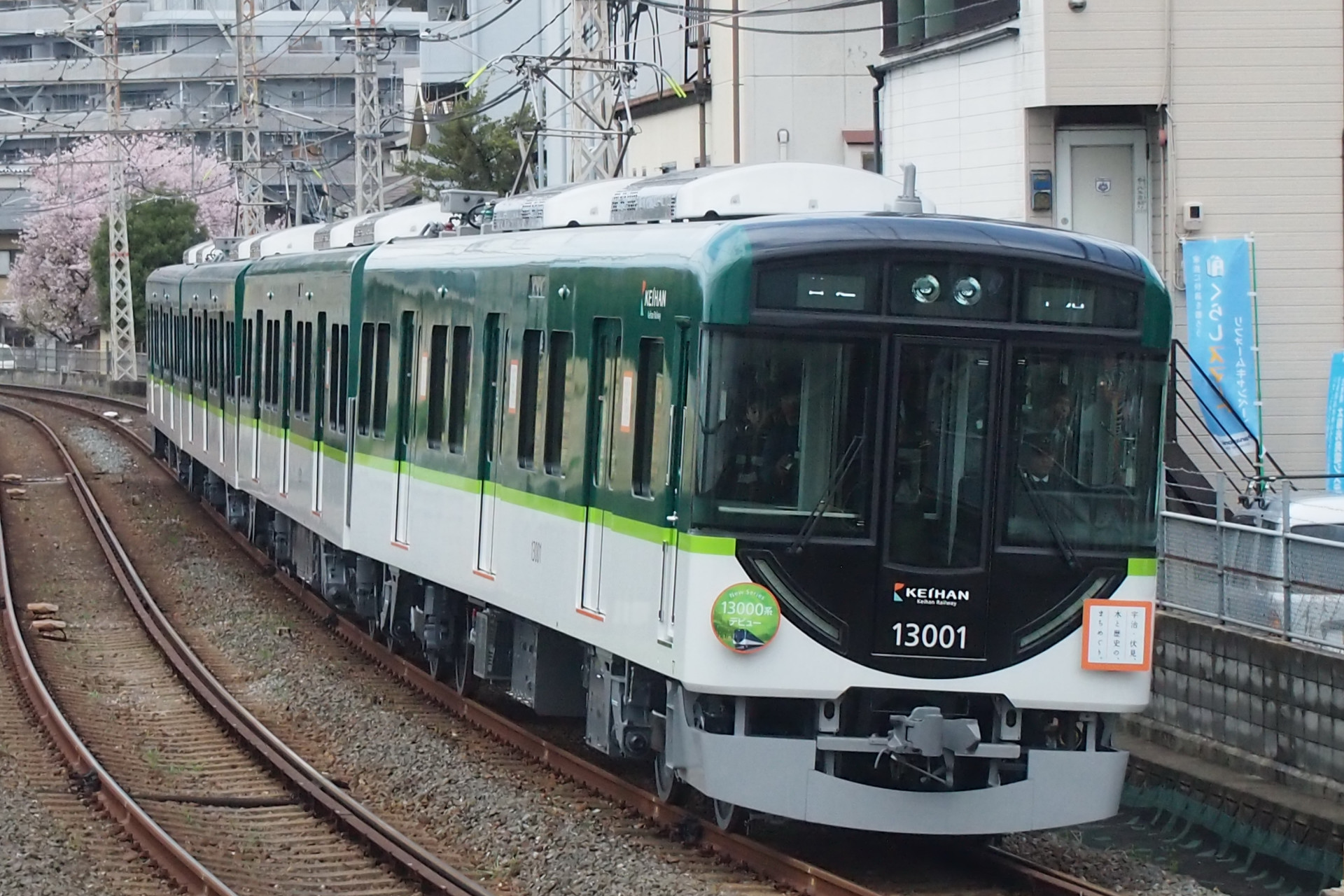
- A 13000 series train on the Uji Line in April 2012

Overview
- Native name: 京阪宇治線
- Owner: Keihan Electric Railway
- Locale: Kyoto Prefecture
- Termini: Chushojima; Uji
- Stations: 8

Service
- Depot(s): Neyagawa, Yodo

History
- Opened: 1 June 1913; 112 years ago

Technical
- Line length: 7.6 km (4.7 mi)
- Number of tracks: double tracks
- Track gauge: 1,435 mm (4 ft 8 1/2 in) standard gauge
- Minimum radius: 200 m
- Electrification: 1,500 V DC overhead wire
- Operating speed: 80 km/h (50 mph)

The Keihan Uji Line (京阪宇治線, Keihan Uji-sen) is a 7.6 km (4.7 mi)-long commuter rail line in Kyoto, Japan, operated by the Keihan Electric Railway. It connects Chushojima Station on the Keihan Main Line in Fushimi, Kyoto and Uji Station in Uji, Kyoto, forming an alternative route to JR West's Nara Line. All trains stop at all stations.

== Stations and connections ==
No.	Station	Japanese	Distance (km)	Transfers	Location
KH28	Chūshojima	中書島	0.0	KH Keihan Main Line	Fushimi-ku, Kyoto
KH71	Kangetsukyō	観月橋	0.7		Fushimi-ku, Kyoto
KH72	Momoyama-minamiguchi	桃山南口	2.3		Fushimi-ku, Kyoto
KH73	Rokujizō	六地蔵	3.1	Tozai Line; D Nara Line	Fushimi-ku, Kyoto
KH74	Kowata	木幡	3.9		Uji
KH75	Ōbaku	黄檗	5.4	D Nara Line	Uji
KH76	Mimurodo	三室戸	7.2		Uji
KH77	Uji	宇治	7.6		Uji

== Rolling stock ==
New 13000 series four-car electric multiple unit (EMU) trains were introduced on the line from April 2012, replacing the earlier 2600 series EMUs.

== History ==
The line opened on June 1, 1913, electrified at 600 V DC.

The voltage on the line was raised to 1,500 V DC in December 1983.

== See also ==
- List of railway lines in Japan
