= Rokujizō Station (Keihan) =

Railway and metro station in Uji, Kyoto Prefecture, Japan

KH73 Rokujizo Station 六地蔵駅
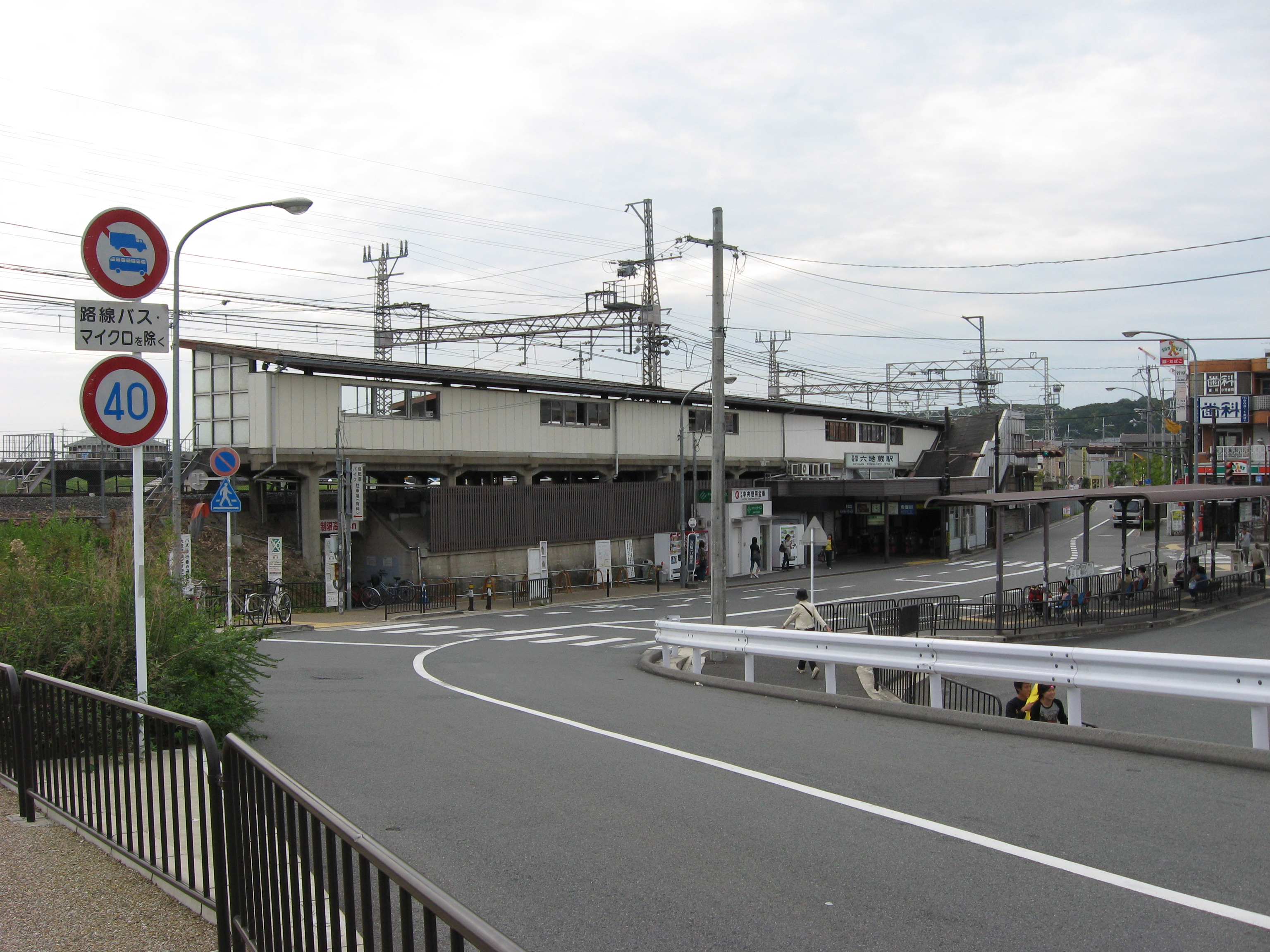
- Keihan Rokujizo Station

General information
- Location: 2, Momoyamacho Nakajimacho, Fushimi, Kyoto, Kyoto （京都市伏見区桃山町中島町2） Japan
- Coordinates: 34°55′55″N 135°47′36″E
- System: Keihan Railway station
- Operator: Keihan Electric Railway
- Line: Uji Line

Other information
- Station code: KH73

History
- Opened: June 1, 1913; 113 years ago

Passengers
- FY 2023: 7,537 daily

Services
Preceding station	Keihan Electric Railway	Following station
Momoyama-minamiguchi towards Chūshojima	Uji Line	Kowata towards Uji
Location

Rokujizō Station (六地蔵駅 Rokujizō-eki) is the station of the Keihan Uji Line is located in Momoyamacho Inaba, Fushimi-ku, Kyoto. The station name means "Six Jizō". Station number is KH73.

== Lines ==
- Keihan Railway Uji Line

Approximately 150 m (490 ft) from both the subway and JR stations is the Rokujizo station operated by the Keihan Electric Railway.

== Overview ==
The Keihan Station is on the west side across the Yamashina River is located in Fushimi-ku, Kyoto City, while the JR and subway stations on the east side are located in Uji City.

When the station was opened in 1913, the station was named "Rokujizo-san" because Daizenji, which is also one of the Kyoto Rokujizo (Rokujizo) in the west-northwest of the Sta., has been popular since ancient times.

== Layout ==
The ground-level station operated by Keihan Railway has an island platform situated between two tracks which can accommodate five-car trains. The station is located in the middle of a curved alignment. There is one entrance with ticket gates on the first floor, with the platform located on the second floor, and a waiting room with air-conditioning installed in the station.

In addition to the stairs, there is a wheelchair-accessible elevator between the ticket gates and the platform, and there are barrier-free facilities such as a multi-purpose toilet installed in the restroom of the first floor.

There is a bus terminal in front of the station. From 1998 to the following year, it was also a stop station of the Uji Rapid train which had been operating as a seasonal train onto the direct Keihan Main Line.

1	■ Uji Line	for Chushojima (Change to the Keihan Line for Yodoyabashi, Nakanoshima and Demachiyanagi)
2	■ Uji Line	for Uji

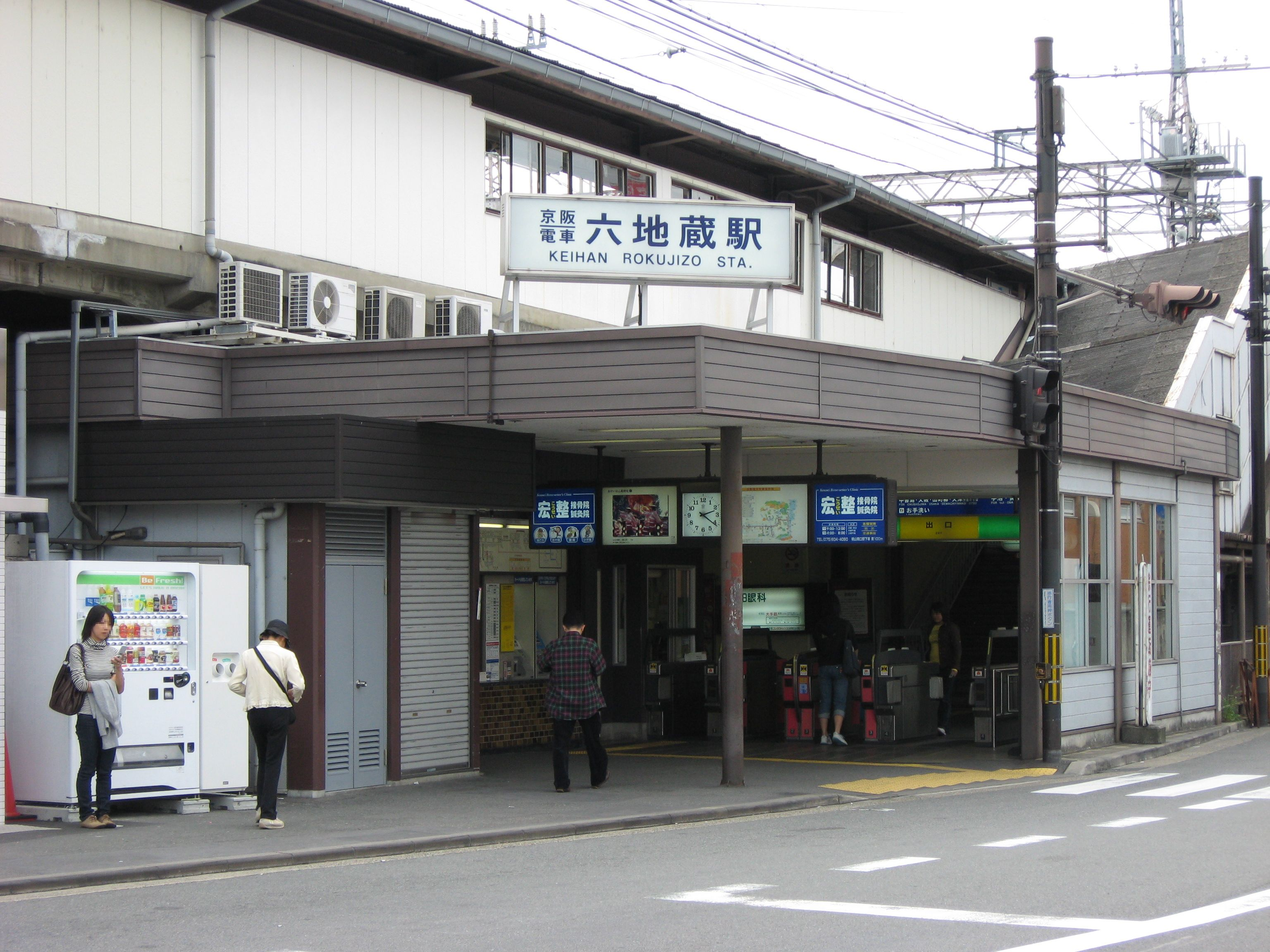
Entrance

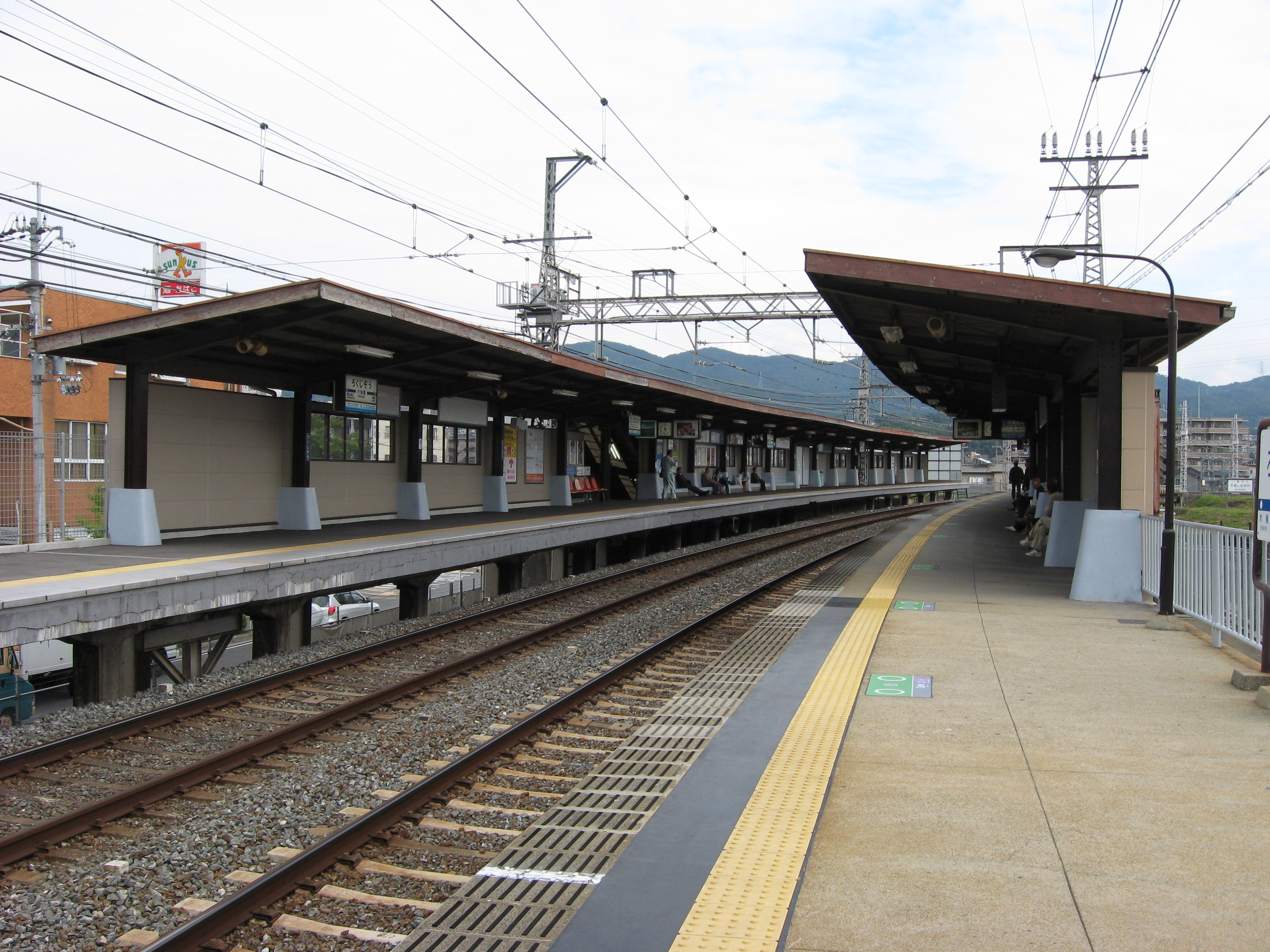
Platform

== History ==
The oldest railway in this area is the Nara Line which has been operating since 1896, but the history of Rokujizō Station began with the opening of the Keihan line in 1913 because the Nara Line did not have its station in Rokujizō until 1992. The Keihan station opened on 1 June 1913.

== Usage information ==
The transition of the number of users is as follows.

What is written here is the number of people who took the train.

Year	Passengers
1999	5,486
2000	5,373
2001	5,263
2002	4,907
2003	4,770
2004	4,603
2005	4,616
2006	4,578
2007	4,536
2008	4,521
2009	4,540
2010	4,458
2011	4,503
2012	4,685
2013	4,605
2014	4,904
2015	5,087
2016	4,066
2017	4,047
2018	4,249
2019	4,158
2020	3,019
2021	3,140
2022	3,384

== Surrounding area ==
The surrounding area has a number of hotels, extensive shops, restaurants and amusement centers. It has undergone significant development in recent years as more people choose to live there or nearby and make use of the excellent transport links to downtown area of Kyoto.

- Daizen-ji
- MOMO Terrace
- Kyoto Animation Studio 1
- Izumiya Rokujizo
