= Nana Fujii =

Japanese shogi player

- Native name: 藤井奈々
- Born: March 31, 1998 (age 28)
- Hometown: Uji, Kyoto Prefecture

Career
- Achieved professional status: June 6, 2018 (aged 20)
- Badge number: W-63
- Rank: Women's 1-dan
- Teacher: Hirofumi Itō (7-dan)

Websites
- JSA profile page

Nana Fujii (藤井 奈々, Fujii Nana; born March 31, 1998) is a Japanese women's professional shogi player ranked 1-dan.

== Women's shogi professional ==
=== Promotion history ===
Fujii's promotion history is as follows:

- 3-kyū: February 20, 2017
- 2-kyū: June 6, 2018
- 1-kyū: December 27, 2018
- 1-dan: April 1, 2020

Note: All ranks are women's professional ranks.
