= Uji =

Uji 宇治市
- City
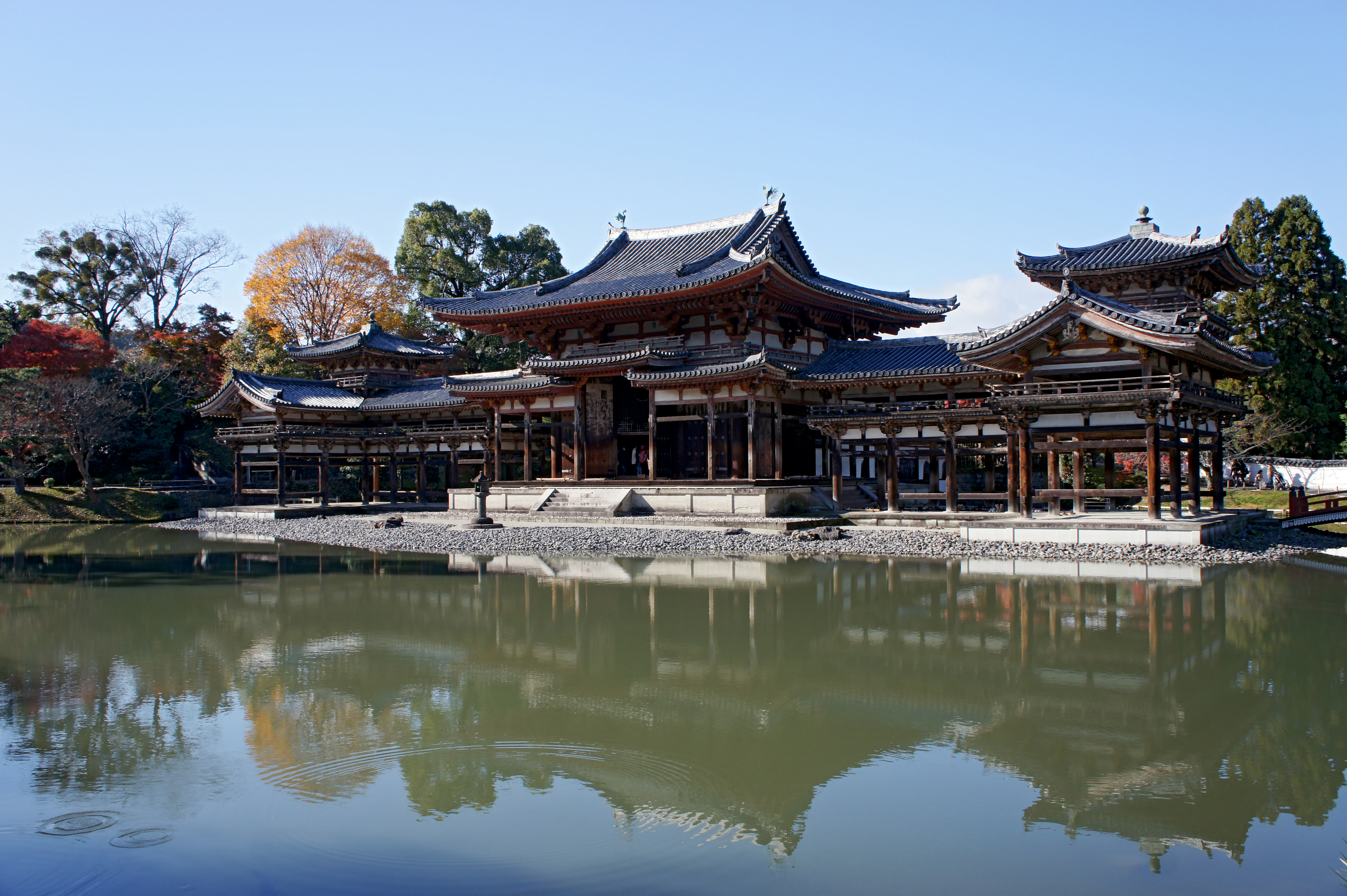
- Byōdō-in, a World Heritage Site

- Flag Seal

- Location of Uji in Kyoto Prefecture

- Coordinates: 34°53′4″N 135°47′59″E
- Country: Japan
- Region: Kansai
- Prefecture: Kyoto Prefecture
- First official recorded: early 5th century
- City Settled: March 1, 1951

Government
  - Mayor: Atsuko Matsumura

Area
  - Total: 67.54 km^{2} (26.08 sq mi)

Population (October 1, 2020)
  - Total: 179,630
  - Density: 2,660/km^{2} (6,888/sq mi)
- Time zone: UTC+9 (Japan Standard Time)
- Tree: Acer
- Flower: Kerria japonica
- Bird: Alcedo atthis
- Phone number: 0774-22-3141
- Address: 33 Uji Biwa, Uji-shi, Kyōto-fu; 611-8501
- Website: www.city.uji.kyoto.jp

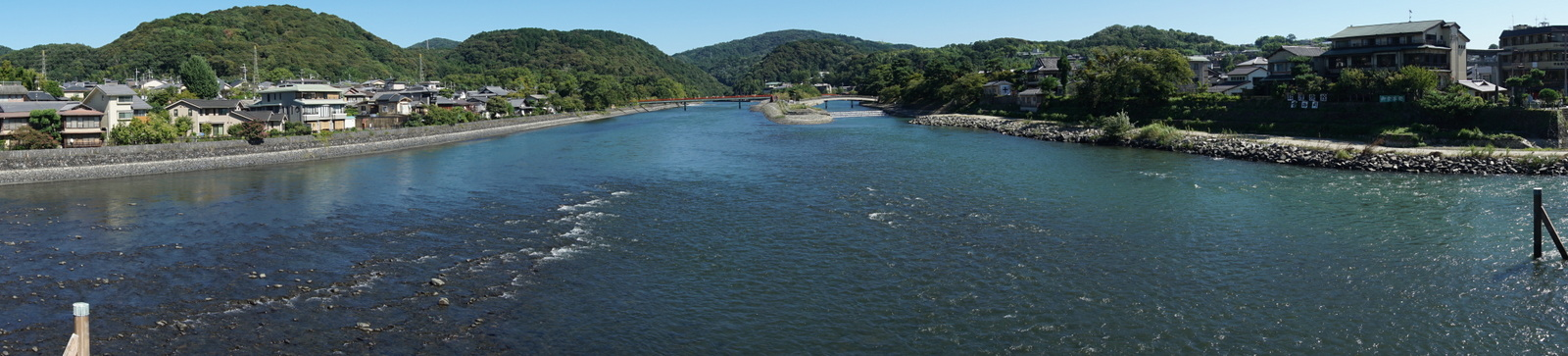
View of Uji River from Uji Bridge

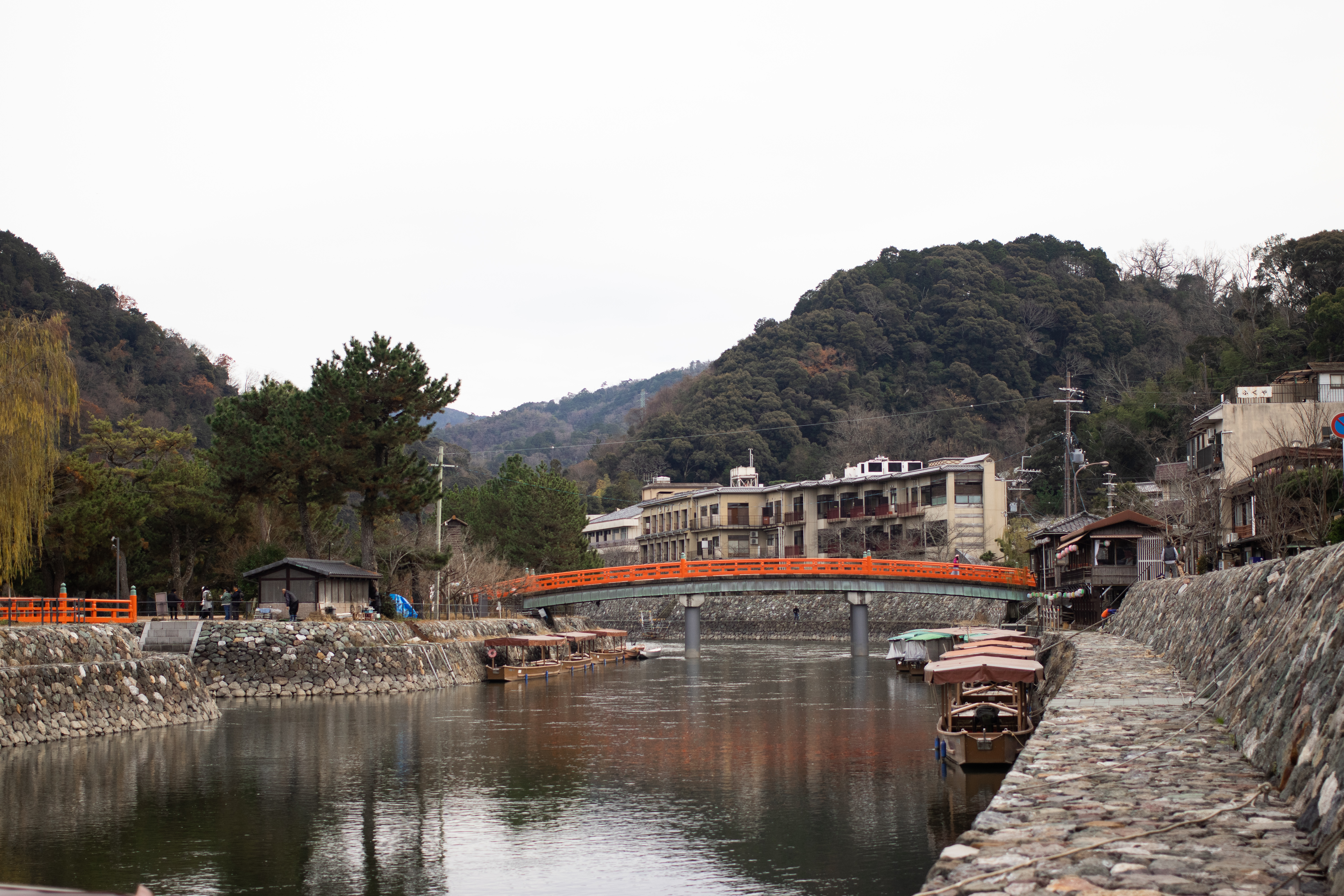
This is the Kisen Bridge, which connects Uji to a small peninsula park called 宇治公園 (Uji Park) in the Uji-Gawa River

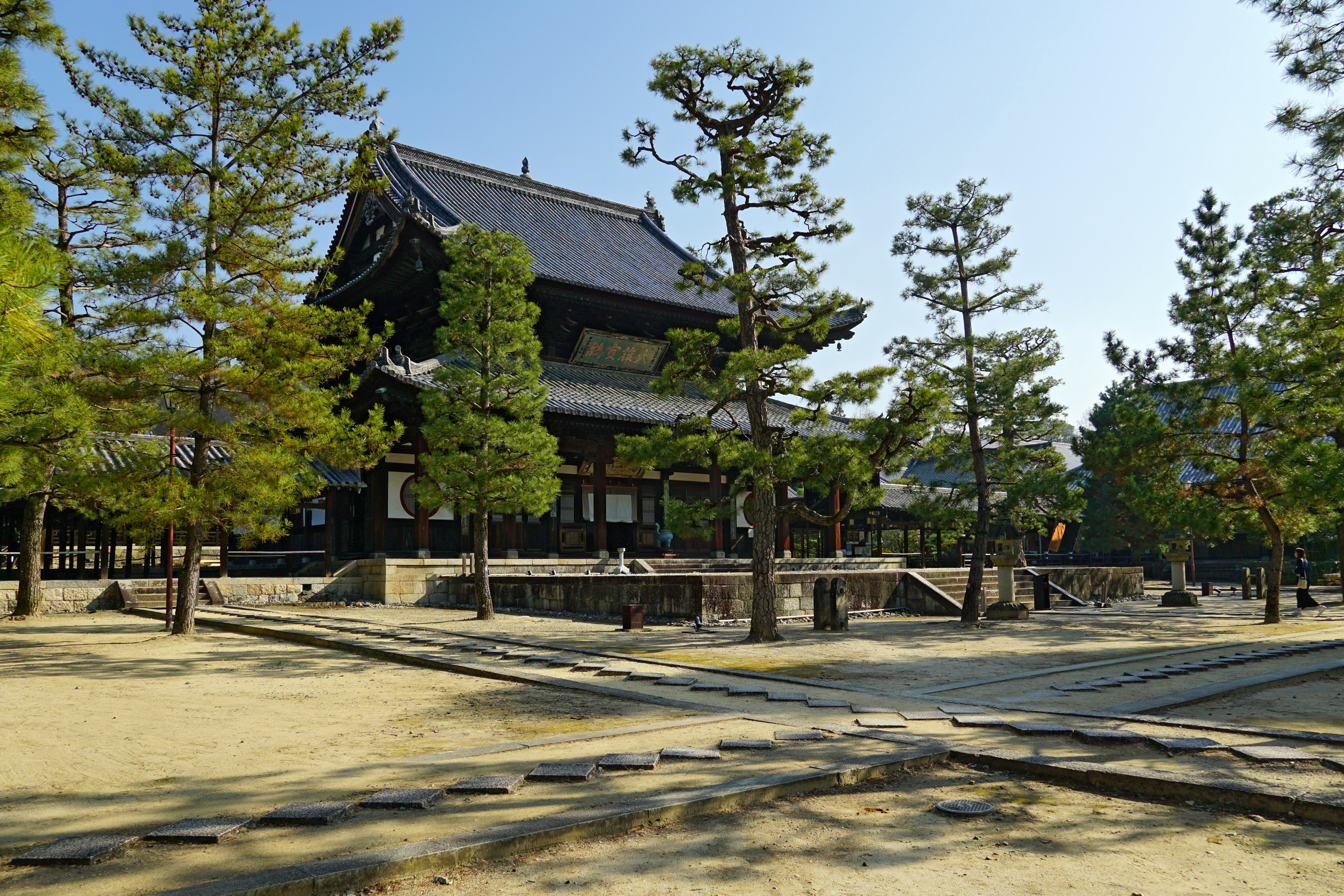
Manpuku-ji

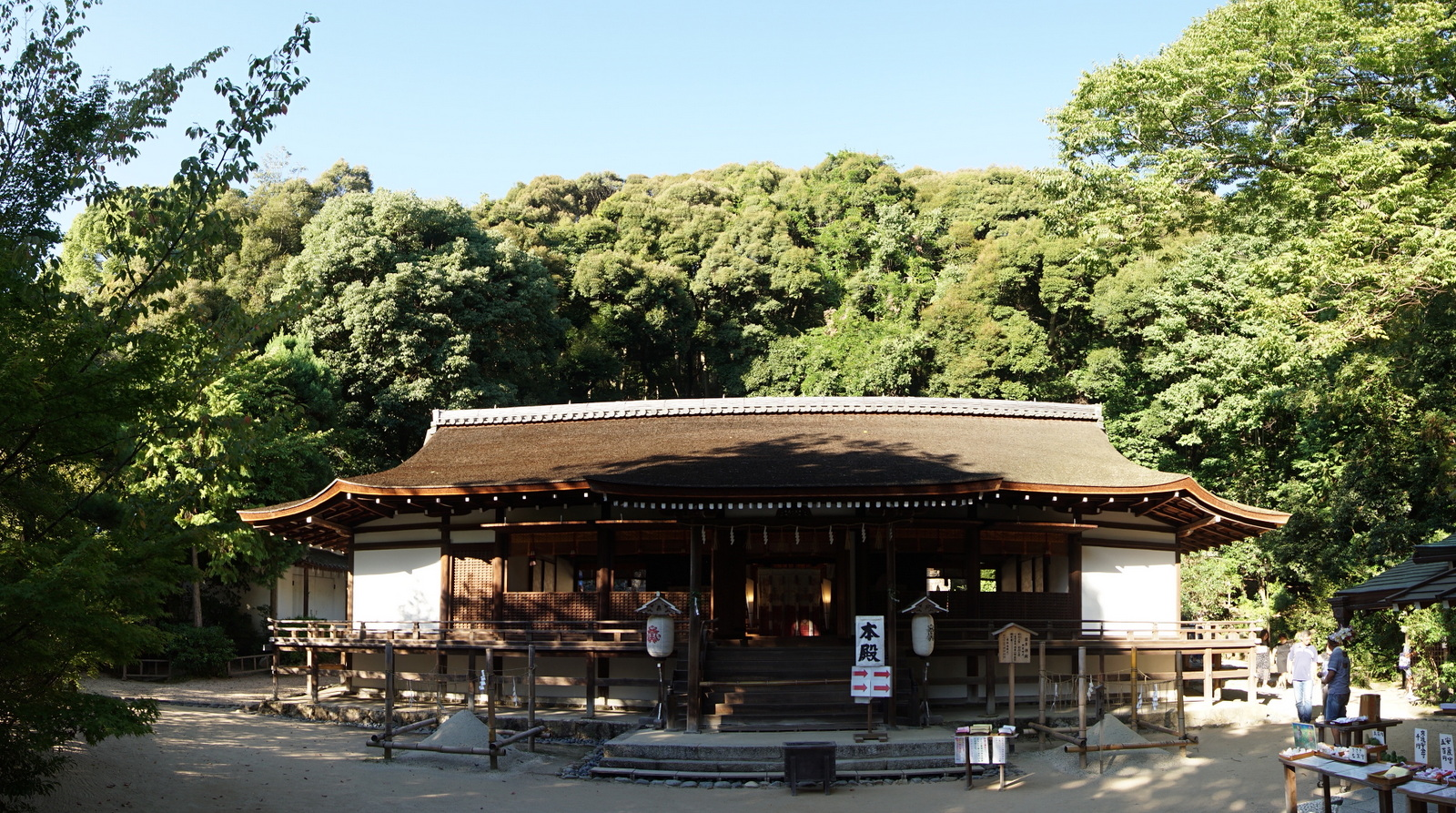
Ujigami Shrine

Uji (宇治市, Uji-shi; Japanese pronunciation: [ɯ̈́.(ɟ̟͡)ʑì, ɯ̈̀.(ɟ̟͡)ʑí.ɕì]) is a city on the southern outskirts of the city of Kyoto, in Kyoto Prefecture, Japan.

Founded on March 1, 1951, Uji is between the two ancient capitals of Nara and Kyoto. The city sits on the Uji River, which has its source in Lake Biwa.

As of 1 October 2020 Uji has a population of 179,630 and is the second largest city in Kyoto Prefecture. It has an area of 67.54 km^{2}, giving it a population density of 2,660 persons per km^{2}.

== History ==
In the 4th century the son of Emperor Ōjin established a palace in Uji. The 11th-century author, Murasaki Shikibu, set much of the final chapters of The Tale of Genji at Uji.

The first battle of Uji in 1180 was the first clash of the Genpei War. Taira forces caught up with Minamoto forces that were attempting to make their way to Nara and defeated them. Later in the war, two factions of Genji clashed at the second battle of Uji in 1184. In 1221, the Jōkyū War was decided at the third battle of Uji, in which forces of the Kamakura shogunate defeated the retired emperor Go-Toba, consolidating the shogunate's control over Japan and the Hōjō clan's control over the shogunate.

Shōgun Ashikaga Yoshimitsu (1358–1408) promoted cultivation of Uji tea in the area. Since then Uji has been an important production and distribution center of superior quality green tea. Tsuen tea has been served since 1160 and is still sold in the oldest tea shop in Japan and possibly the world—the Tsuen tea shop. In the 15th century, shimamono tea jars destined to be used in the Japanese tea ceremony were brought by the shōgun from Luzon to Uji.

Uji contains the ethnic Korean enclave Utoro district, which was formed from forced laborers who were made to build an airstrip in Kyoto beginning in 1941.

== Geography ==
- Lake Ogura
- Uji River

== Demographics ==
Per Japanese census data, the population of Uji has recently plateaued after decades of strong growth.

Historical population
Year	Pop.	±%
1920	16,807	—
1930	21,355	+27.1%
1940	27,748	+29.9%
1950	38,231	+37.8%
1960	47,336	+23.8%
1970	103,497	+118.6%
1980	152,692	+47.5%
1990	177,010	+15.9%
2000	189,112	+6.8%
2010	189,608	+0.3%
2020	179,630	−5.3%
Source: ,

== Sightseeing and events ==
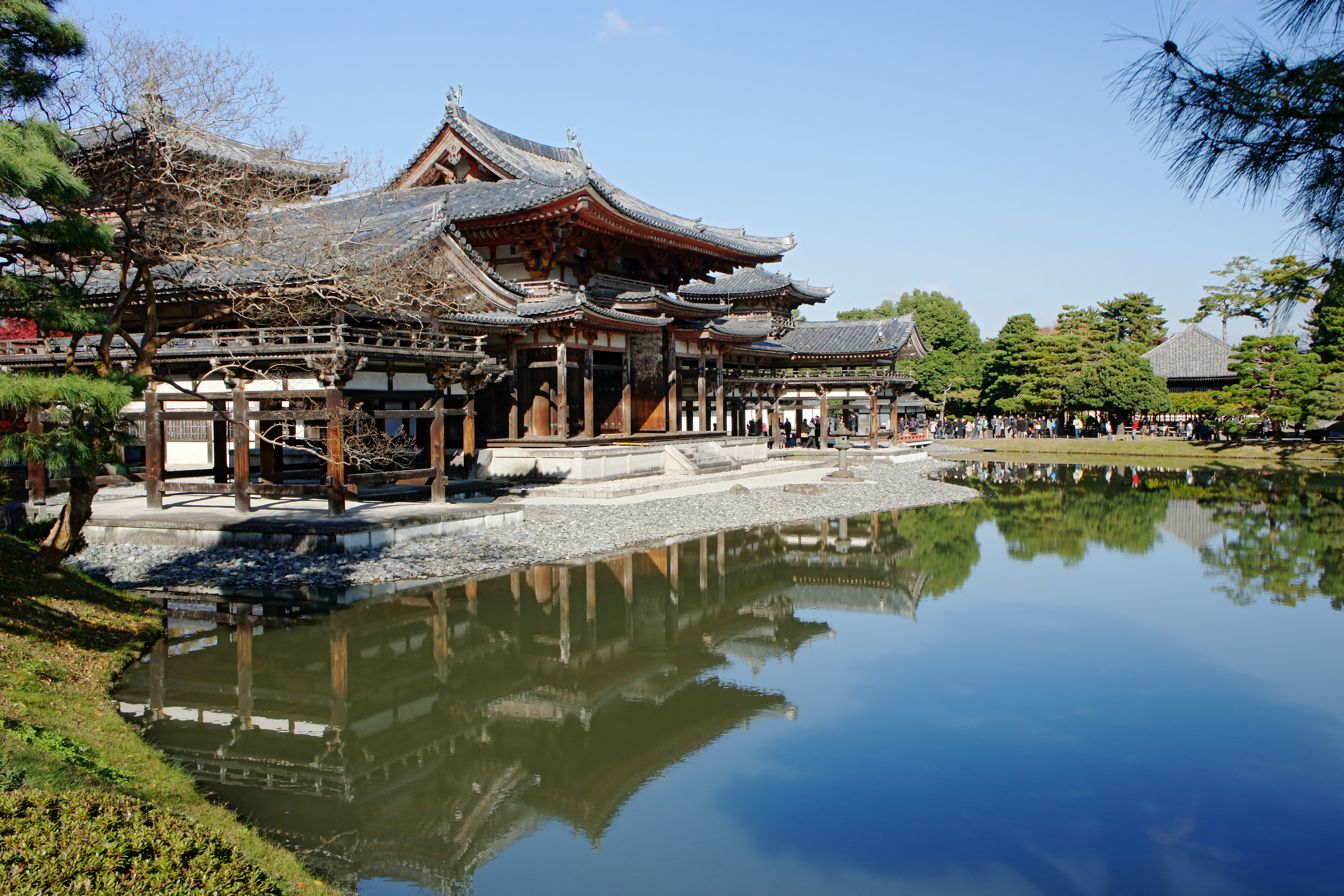
Phoenix Hall and Garden, Byōdō-in

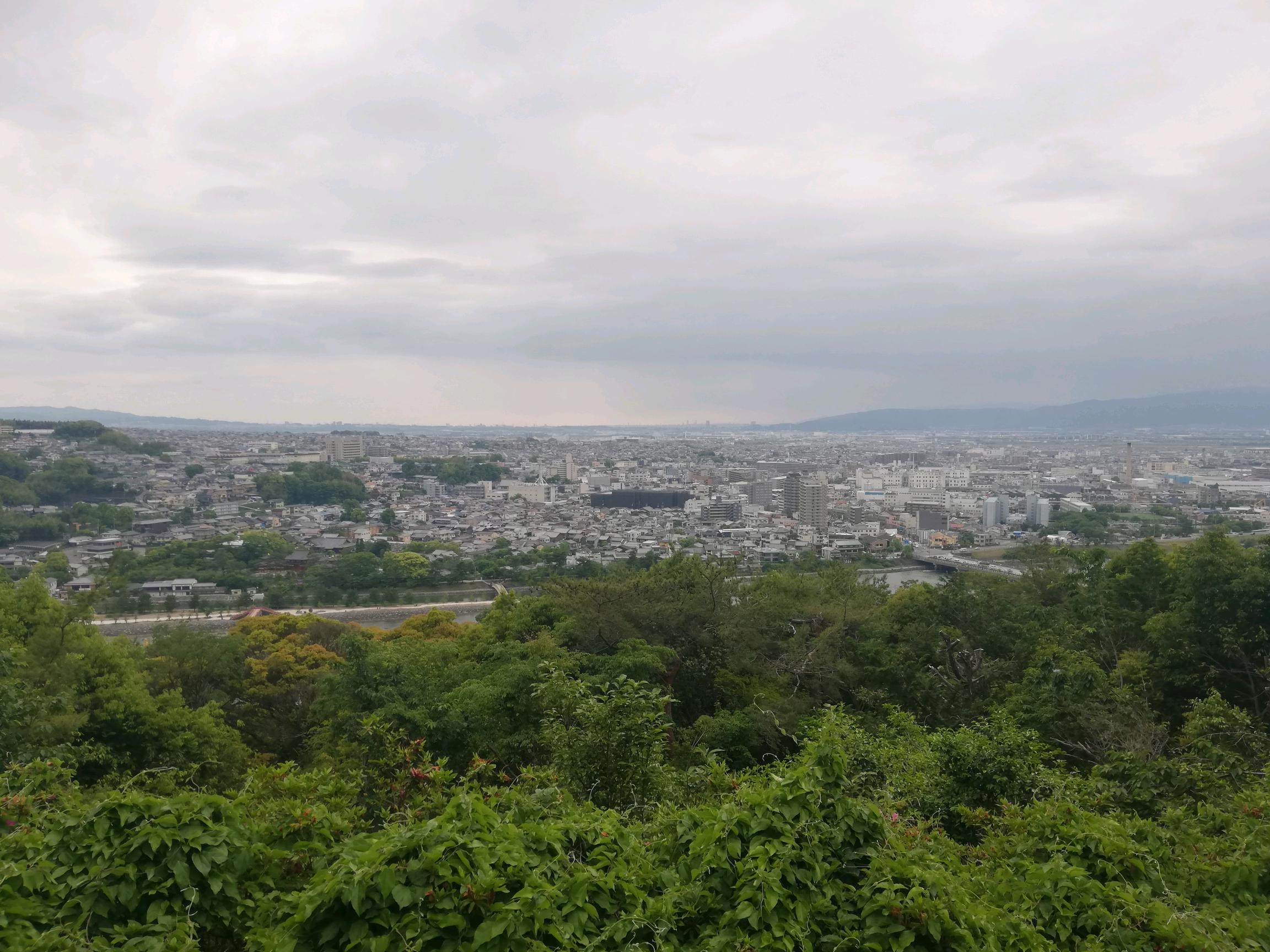
Panoramic view of downtown Uji. including Byōdō-in (2020)

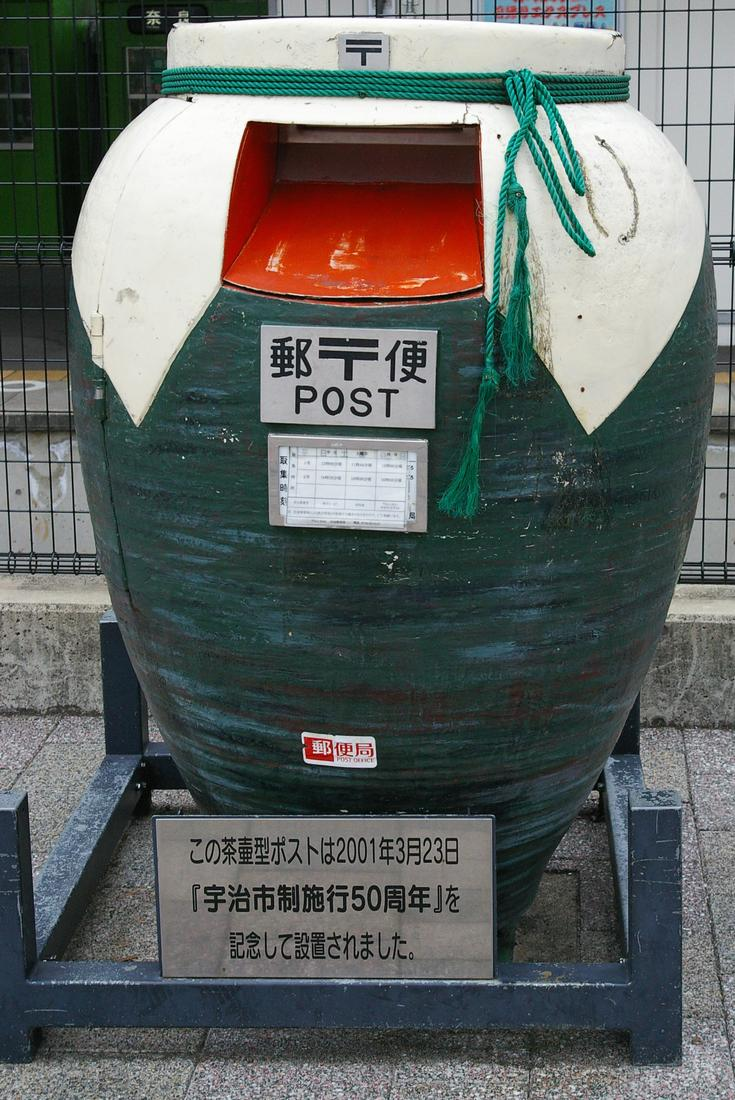
A public post box in Uji shaped as tea caddy

Most visitors are attracted to Uji for its centuries-old historic sites, which include many Shinto shrines, Buddhist temples and Hindu Shrines. Among the most famous are the Ujigami Shrine (built in 1060) and the Byōdō-in that are part of the UNESCO World Heritage Site "Historic Monuments of Ancient Kyoto". The Byōdō-in, with its Amida (Phoenix) Hall built in 1053, is featured on the obverse side of the 10 yen coin. It was also featured on several Japanese postage stamps, a. o. of 1950, 1957 and 1959.

Other religious sites include the Manpuku-ji, the head temple of the Ōbaku Zen sect, built in Chinese Ming style in 1661 and the Zen temple Kōshō-ji, with its Kotozaka entrance (framed with dense thickets of cherry, kerria, azalea, and maple trees, each of which dramatically changes color with the seasons) constructed in 1648. Noteworthy is the Mimuroto-ji, which is famous for its purple hydrangeas. The city features numerous other small Shinto shrines. With a few exceptions, most of the important historical sites are in walking distance of one another and all are easily accessed by rail.

The last ten chapters of the Japanese classic novel The Tale of Genji take place in Uji, and so there is The Tale of Genji Museum.

Uji has many natural attractions, including its scenic riverside, large parks, and a botanical garden. Slightly upriver from Uji Bridge, the Amagase Dam spans the river and day trippers can walk to its base in about an hour. The route, which begins directly across from Keihan Uji Station, is along the river on a paved road and offers access to several grassy open spaces where people can rest and picnic.

The city hosts two major festivals each year. The Agata Festival, held on June 5, begins in the early morning and runs until late at night. Like many cities in Japan, Uji hosts an hours-long fireworks festival on August 10. Both events draw huge crowds and require that the town's main thoroughfare to be shut down.

There is cormorant fishing in summer during the evening, from mid-June to late September.

Every August, Seicho-no-Ie holds a Memorial Festival (盂蘭盆供養大祭, Urabon kuyō taisai) (annual ancestor ceremony) at Uji Bekkaku Honzan (宇治別格本山), a special Seicho-no-Ie head temple located next to Hōzō Shrine (宝蔵神社, Hōzo Jinja) in Uji.

== Media ==
- FM Uji
- Jonan Shimpo
- Kyoto Animation, the story of Sound! Euphonium also takes place in Uji.
- Rakunan Times

== Transportation ==
=== Rail ===
Uji is served by three rail companies: JR West, Keihan, and Kintetsu. The Keihan line which runs primarily between Kyoto and downtown Osaka serves the city via the branch Uji Line running from Chushojima station and ending along the river at Keihan Uji Station beside the Uji Bridge. The station is close to Uji's Tale of Genji Town, Uji Bridge, and the Byodoin. All trains on this line stop at every station.

The JR Nara Line runs between Kyoto and Nara. JR Uji station was, until a few years ago, fairly rural but was recently rebuilt to better serve the city. Architecturally it mimics the Byodo-in and is on the opposite side of the Uji river, about 10 minutes' walk from Keihan Uji Station. The clock in front of the station is of special interest and, every hour on the hour, opens to reveal an automated show that celebrates the town's heritage as a center of tea production. Like Keihan Uji Station, JR Uji has easy access to the same sites. The station is served by local and express trains.

Kintetsu serves West Uji with a line between Kyoto and Nara and does not have a station named for the town. The line is primarily used by commuters and includes Ogura, Iseda, and Ōkubo. No stations are close to the main tourist sites.

=== Bus ===
Local buses have routes in the city and public transportation is good. Charter buses to and from the Kansai International (KIX) and Itami airports can be caught at most of the train stations.

=== Roads ===
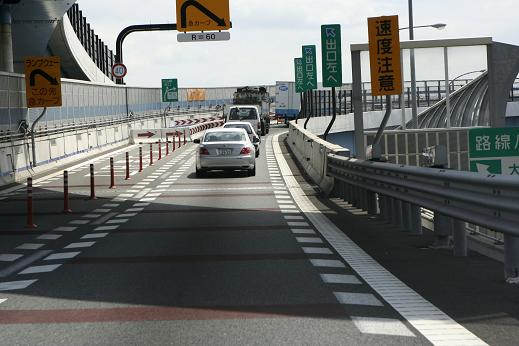
On ramp for Keiji Bypass

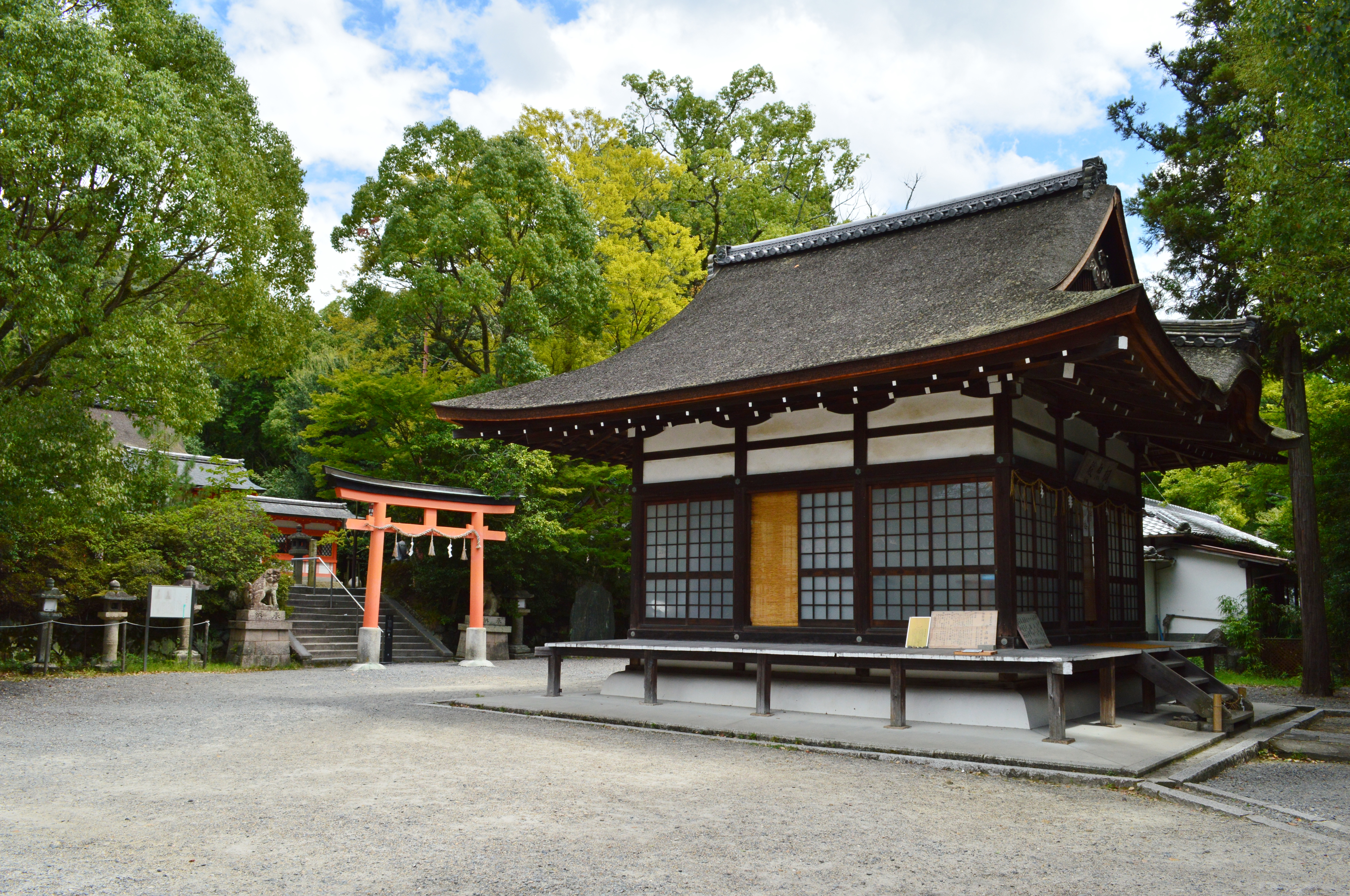
Uji Shrine

Uji is south of the main Meishin Expressway and is served directly by the Keiji Bypass, a toll road that was completed a few years ago. The Keiji Bypass circumvents Kyoto and Ōtsu which can be subject to traffic jams. The road is notable for its high trestles and series of long tunnels — including one that is approximately six miles long. The Keiji Bypass links to Dai Ni Keihan Road (Number Two Kyoto Osaka Road) which is under construction and usable for at least part of its length.

Non-toll roads include Route 1 which runs between Kyoto and Osaka and Route 24 which runs between Kyoto and Nara. These roads are usually filled with traffic and have many stoplights. Close by is Route 307, which runs east/west along the southern edge of the city between Osaka and Shiga prefecture. This is a fairly rural road that leads through the mountains and, once away from the urban centers, makes a nice day trip.

Of special interest to motorsports enthusiasts is the Ujigawa Line (Uji River Line). This twisty road parallels the Uji River between Uji and Otsu and is a favorite for racers. The road is dangerous and often claims lives. Due to numerous accidents, the route is closed to motorcycles for most of August, when Japanese schools are typically out of session.

== Friendship cities ==
Uji has friendship agreements with three other cities:

- Kamloops, British Columbia, Canada
- Nuwara Eliya, Sri Lanka
- Xianyang, Shaanxi, People's Republic of China

== Notable people from Uji ==
- Takanori An'yōji, Japanese professional shogi player, ranked 7-dan
- Masako Chiba, Japanese long-distance runner
- Nana Fujii, Japanese women's professional shogi player ranked 1-dan
- Yoshiyuki Hasegawa, former Japanese football player
- Tetsuya Kanmuri, Japanese heavy metal singer
- Makoto Kakuda, Japanese football player who plays for V-Varen Nagasaki
- Akira Kawashima, Japanese comedian, tarento and actor
- Keika Kitamura, Japanese women's professional shogi player ranked 1-dan
- Ryo Matsumura, Japanese football player for Chiangmai in Thai League 2
- Hiroe Minagawa, Japanese sport wrestler (Freestyle wrestling)
- Shizuka Nakamura, Japanese gravure idol and actress
- Yusuke Nakatani, former Japanese football player
- Kei Shimizu, Japanese comedian (Real Name: Keita Shimizu, Nihongo: 清水 圭太, Shimizu Keita)
- Novala Takemoto, Japanese author and fashion designer (Real Name: Toshiaki Takemoto, Nihongo: 嶽本 稔明, Takemoto Toshiaki)
- Yuka Tsujiyoko, Japanese video game music composer (Real Name: Yuka Bamba, Nihongo: バンバユカ, Banba Yuka)
- Oumae Kumiko, Japanese Euphonium player Musician Nihongo: 黄前 久美子Oumae Kumiko)
- Asuka Tanaka, Japanese Euphonium player Musician Nihongo: 田中 あすかTanaka Asuka)

== In popular culture ==
Featured in the famous 2015 Anime Hibike Euphonium as the place where the anime events took place.
