= Chūshojima Station =

Railway station in Kyoto, Japan

Chushojima Station 中書島駅
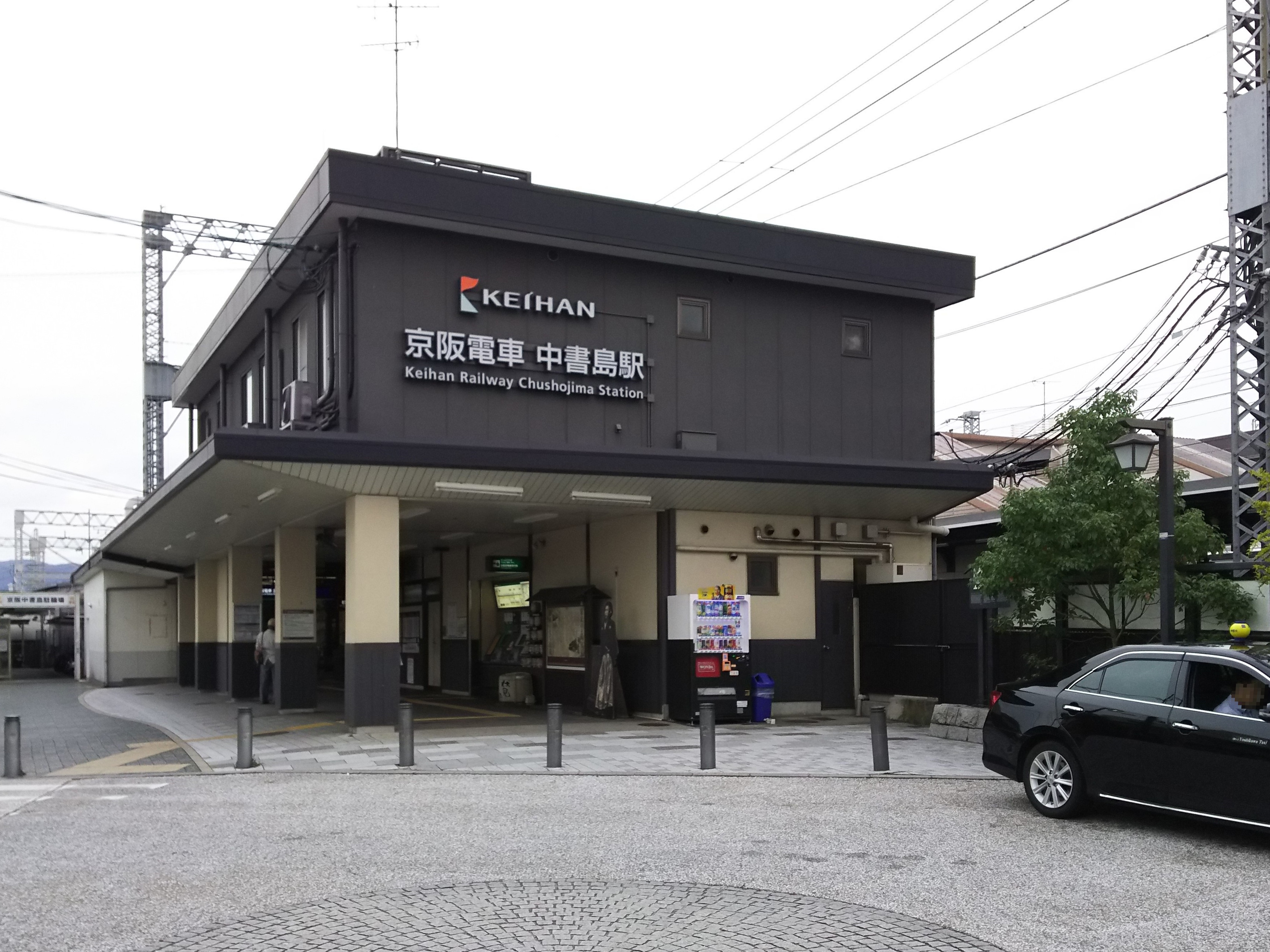
- Chushojima Station building and north entrance in October 2017

General information
- Location: Yoshijima-Yaguracho, Fushimi-ku, Kyoto; Japan
- Coordinates: 34°55′36.77″N 135°45′36.07″E
- Operator: Keihan Electric Railway
- Lines: Keihan Main Line; Uji Line
- Platforms: 2 side platforms + 1 island platform
- Tracks: 4

Other information
- Station code: KH28
- Website: Official website

History
- Opened: April 14, 1910; 116 years ago

Passengers
- FY2015: 5.2 million

Services
Preceding station	Keihan Electric Railway	Following station
Yodo towards Yodoyabashi	Keihan Main Line Local Sub Express	Fushimi-Momoyama towards Sanjō
Yodo towards Yodoyabashi	Keihan Main Line Commuter Sub Express	Fushimi-Momoyama One-way operation
Iwashimizu-hachimangū towards Yodoyabashi	Keihan Main Line Express	Tambabashi towards Sanjō
Yodo Terminus	Keihan Main Line Express	Tambabashi towards Sanjō
Kuzuha towards Yodoyabashi	Keihan Main Line Rapid Express Limited Express Liner	Tambabashi towards Sanjō
Kuzuha towards Nakanoshima	Keihan Main Line Commuter Rapid Express	Tambabashi One-way operation
Terminus	Uji Line	Kangetsukyō towards Uji
Location
- Location within Japan

Chushojima Station (中書島駅, Chūshojima-eki) is a railway station in Yoshijima-Yaguracho, Fushimi-ku, Kyoto, Japan, operated by the private railway operator Keihan Electric Railway.

== Lines ==
Chushojima Station is served by the Keihan Main Line and the Keihan Uji Line.

== Layout ==
The station has two side platforms and an island platform, serving a total of four tracks. There is an entrance on each side platform (north entrance: in the west of the side platform to take trains for Demachiyanagi, south entrance: in the west of the side platform used in the early morning for trains for Uji).

=== Platforms ===
1	■ Keihan Main Line	for Tambabashi, Sanjo, and Demachiyanagi
2	■ Keihan Main Line	for Hirakatashi, Kyobashi, Yodoyabashi, and Nakanoshima
3	■ Keihan Uji Line	for Rokujizō and Uji
4	■ Keihan Uji Line	for Rokujizo and Uji (departing in the early morning)

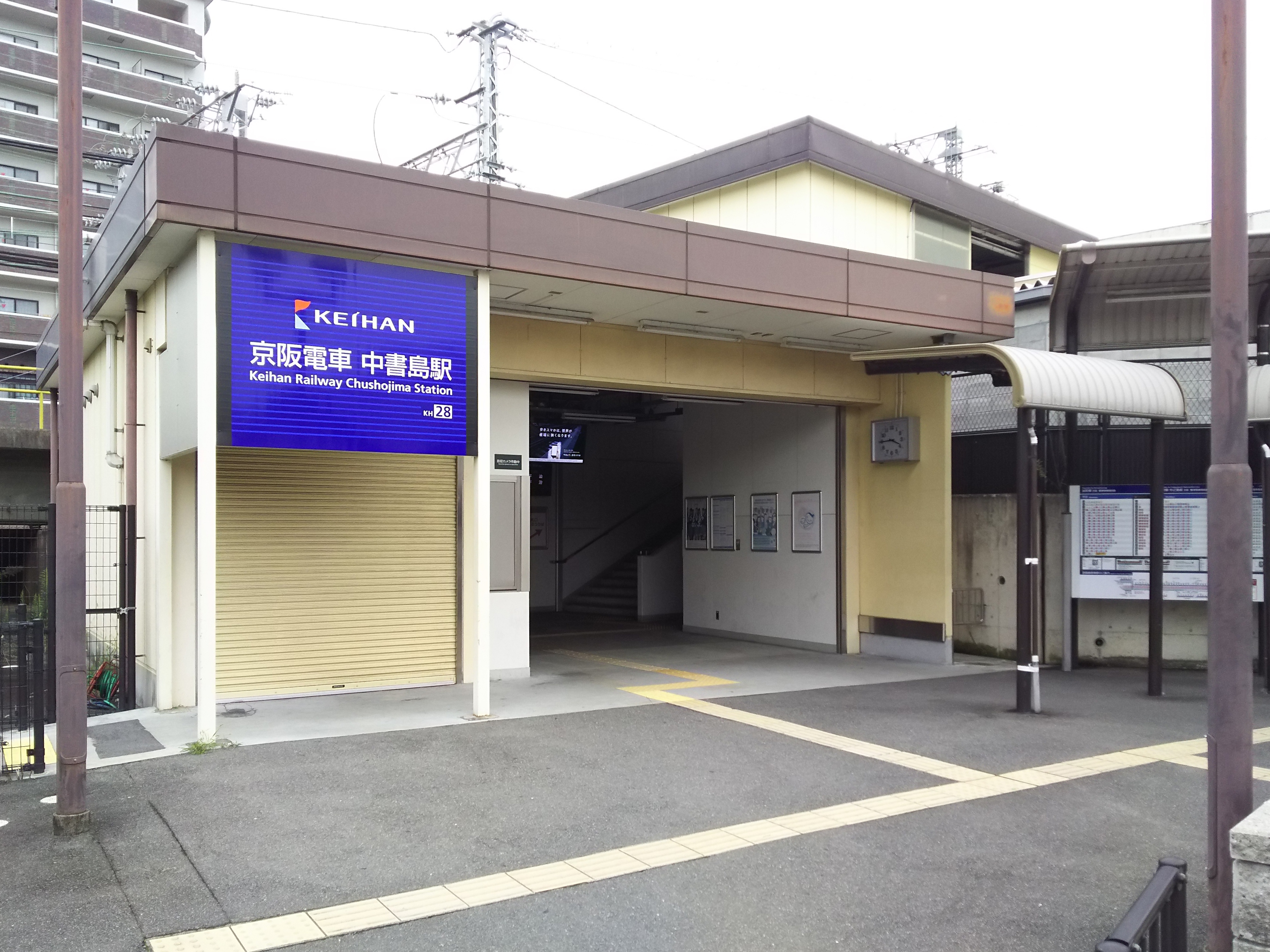
The south entrance in October 2017

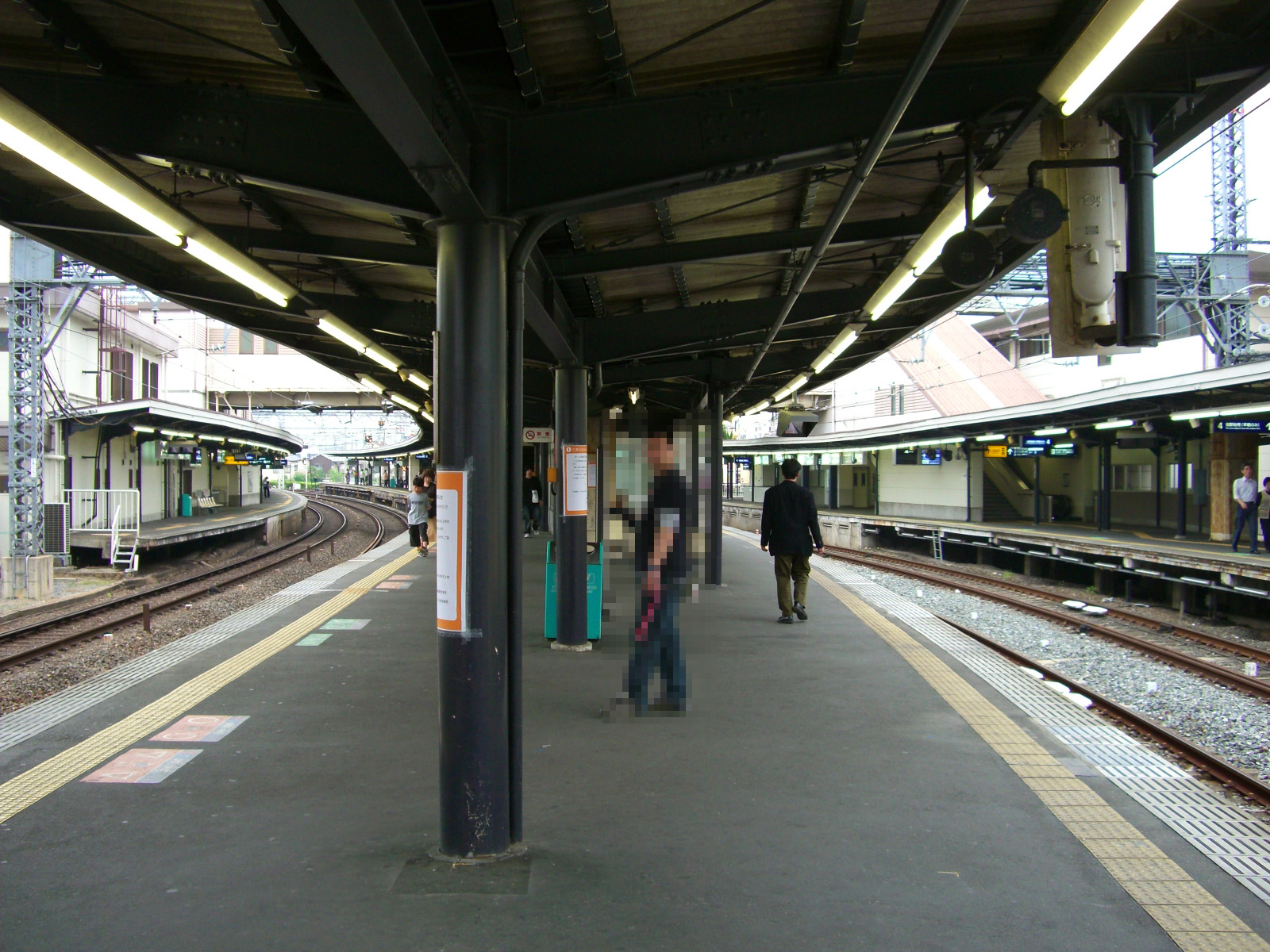
The platforms in May 2007

== History ==
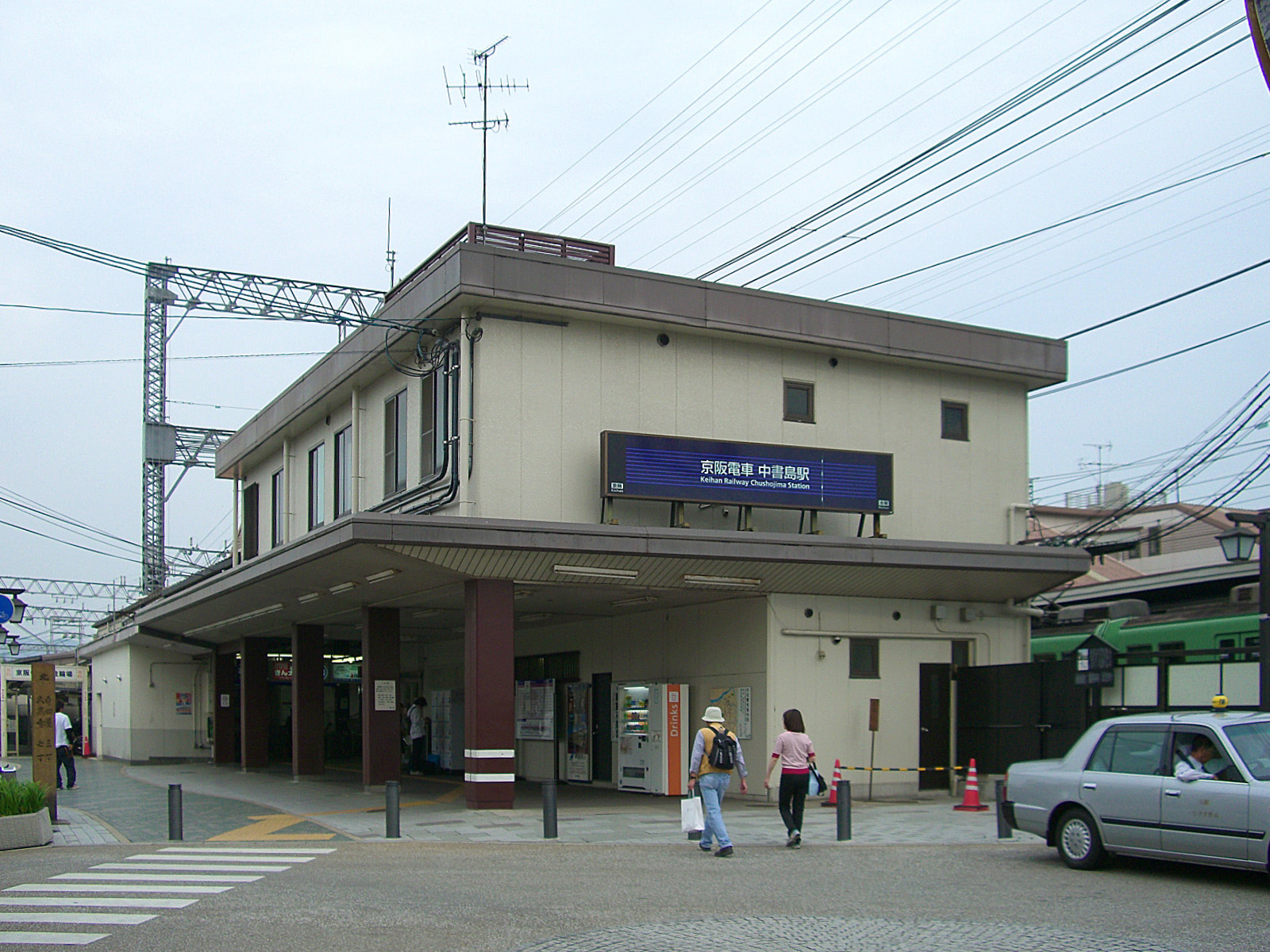
The station building and north entrance in May 2005

The station opened on 15 April 1910.

== Passenger statistics ==
In fiscal 2011, the station was used by an average of 12,691 passengers daily.

== See also ==
- List of railway stations in Japan
