= Uji Station (Keihan) =

Railway station in Uji, Kyoto Prefecture, Japan

Uji Station 宇治駅
- Uji Station in September 2026

General information
- Location: 7-13, Uji-Otsukata, Uji, Kyoto （京都府宇治市宇治乙方7-13） Japan
- Coordinates: 34°53′40.5″N 135°48′22.81″E
- Operator: Keihan Electric Railway
- Line: Uji Line
- Platforms: 1 island platform
- Connections: Bus terminal

History
- Opened: 1913

Services
Preceding station	Keihan Electric Railway	Following station
Mimurodo towards Chūshojima	Uji Line	Terminus
Location

Uji Station (宇治駅, Uji-eki) is a train station on the Keihan Railway Uji Line in Uji, Kyoto Prefecture, Japan, and it is the terminal station on the Uji Line.

The station building, designed by architect Hiroyuki Wakabayashi, was awarded the Good Design Award in 1996. In 2000, the station was selected as one of "Best 100 Stations in Kinki Region" by Kinki District Transport Bureau of the Ministry of Land, Infrastructure, Transport and Tourism.

== Layout ==
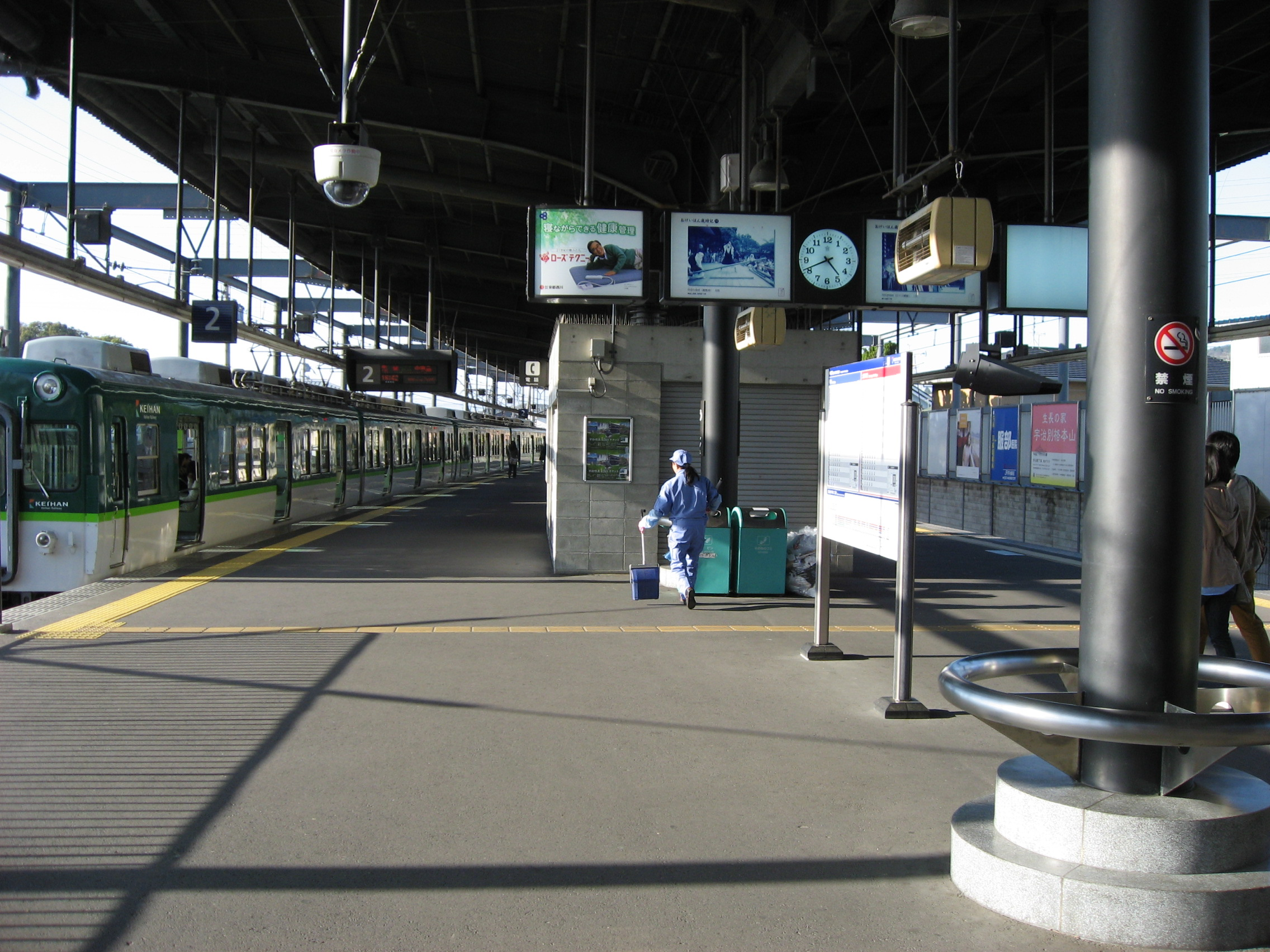
Platform

The station has an island platform with two tracks on the ground.

1, 2	■ Uji Line	for Chūshojima, Yodoyabashi, Nakanoshima and Demachiyanagi

== Surroundings ==
- Uji Bridge
- Ujigami Shrine
- Agata Shrine
- The Tale of Genji Museum
- Kōshōji
- Byōdōin
- Tsuen Tea
- Uji Station (JR West)
