= Kintetsu-Tambabashi Station =

Railway station in Kyoto, Japan

Kintetsu-Tambabashi Station 近鉄丹波橋駅
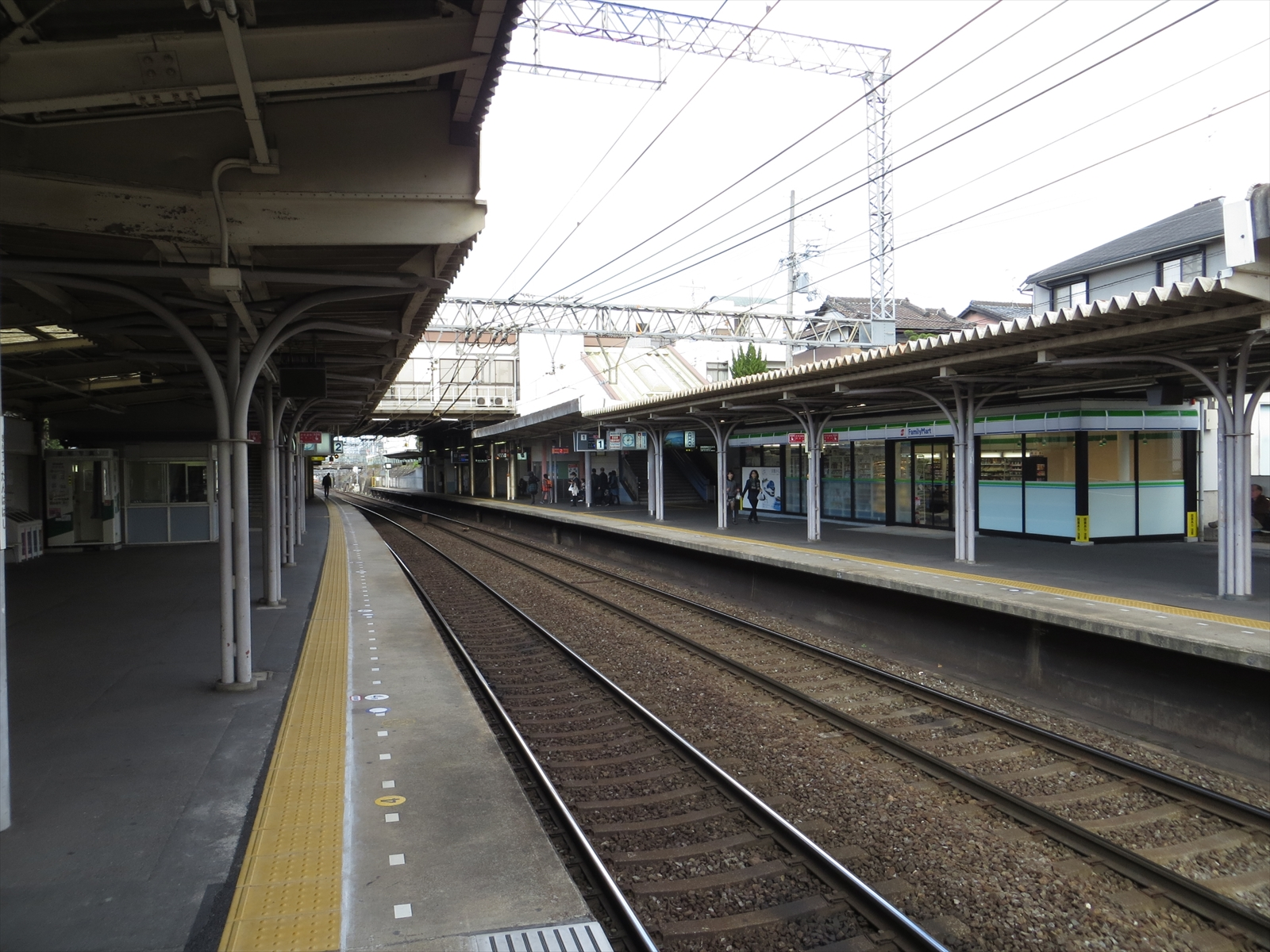
- Platform of Kintetsu-Tambabashi Station

General information
- Location: Momoyama Tsutsuiiga Higashimachi, Fushimi-ku, Kyoto-fu, 612-0072; Japan
- Coordinates: 34°56′18.33″N 135°45′58.88″E
- System: Kintetsu Railway commuter rail station
- Owner: Kintetsu Railway
- Operator: Kintetsu Railway
- Line: Kyoto/Kashihara Line
- Distance: 6.0 km from Kyoto
- Platforms: 2 side platforms
- Connections: Tambabashi Station (Keihan Main Line)

Construction
- Structure type: "hashigami"-style

Other information
- Station code: B07
- Website: Official

History
- Opened: 15 November 1928
- Closed: 1945 - 1968
- Former names: Horiuchi (to 1945); Kinki Nihon Tambabashi (1968 to 1970)

Passengers
- FY2015: 46,795 daily

Services
Preceding station	Kintetsu Railway	Following station
Fushimi towards Kyōto	Kyoto Line Local	Momoyamagoryō-mae towards Yamato-Saidaiji
Takeda towards Kyōto	Kyoto Line Semi-Express Express	Momoyamagoryō-mae towards Yamato-Saidaiji
Kyōto Terminus	Kyoto Line Limited Express	Yamato-Saidaiji Terminus
Location
- Location within Kyoto Prefecture Location within Japan

Kintetsu-Tambabashi Station (近鉄丹波橋駅, Kintetsu Tanbabashi-eki) is a passenger railway station located in Fushimi-ku in Kyoto, Japan. It is operated by the private railway operator Kintetsu Railway.It is station number B07. It is closely connected by a sheltered pedestrian bridge to Tambabashi Station on the Keihan Electric Railway Keihan Line.

== Lines ==
Kintetsu-Tambabashi Station is served by the Kyoto Line, and is located 6.0 kilometers from the terminus of the line at Kyoto Station.

== Station layout ==
The station consists two opposed side platforms, connected by an elevated station building. The station is unattended.

=== Platforms ===
1	■ Kintetsu Kyoto Line	for Kintetsu Nara, Tenri and Kashiharajingu-mae
2	■ Kintetsu Kyoto Line	for Kyoto

== History ==
Track layout, including Keihan Line, as of 1967 (click to expand)

The station opened as Horiuchi Station (堀内駅) on 15 November 1928 as a station of Nara Electric Railroad. On 21 December 1945, the Nara Electric Railway tracks were connected to Keihan's Tambabashi Station and Horiuchi Station was discontinued. The old platforms were reopened on 29 March 1967 for Kintetsu trains (except Keihan-through trains) as a part of integrated Tambabashi Station. The through Keihan trains were discontinued on 20 December 1968, and the Kintestsu portion was renamed Kinki Nihon Tanbabashi Station (近畿日本丹波橋駅). This was shortened to the present name on 1 March 1970.

The route of the Kintetsu line north of this station was formerly a track of the Nara Line although the Nara Line did not have a station between Fushimi and Momoyama Stations. The former Nara Line south of this station to the merging point with the present line was totally removed and cannot be traced.

While the areas of the Keihan and Kintetsu stations are limited by Tanbabashi Street to the north and Shimo-Itabashi Street to the south, before the integration of the stations in 1945, the gate of Horiuchi Station was on Shimo-Itabashi Street and the gate of Tambabashi Station was on Tanbabashi Street. Therefore, transferring passengers were recommended to change trains at Momoyamagoryō-mae Station and Fushimi-Momoyama Station, both of which were facing the same Ōtesuji Street, rather than transferring at Horiuchi and Tambabashi. When the integrated station was separated in 1960s, the stations were rebuilt with a connection bridge that provides easy access between Tambabashi and Kintetsu-Tambabashi stations.

The physical connection of the Keihan and Nara Electric Railway lines and the integration of the stations were made to provide a redundancy for the railway network in consideration of a possible destruction of railway facilities by enemy attacks although the construction was completed in December 1945, after the end of World War II. The crossovers were removed after the end of through services in 1968, but the traces can be easily discovered.

== Passenger statistics ==
In fiscal 2023, the station was used by an average of 39,779 passengers daily (boarding passengers only).

== Surrounding area ==
- Fushimi-Momoyama Castle
- Emperor Kanmu's Mausoleum
- Daikokuji Temple (Satsuma-dera)
- Kinfuda Shrine (Shiragiku Myojin Shrine)
- Kyoto Municipal Fushimi Itabashi Elementary School

== See also ==
- List of railway stations in Japan
