= Fushimi Station =

Fushimi Station is the name of multiple train stations in Japan.

- Fushimi Station (Kyoto) - on the Kintetsu Kyoto Line in Fushimi-ku, Kyoto, Kyoto Prefecture
- Fushimi Station (Nagoya) - on the Nagoya Subway Higashiyama Line and the Nagoya Subway Tsurumai Line in Naka-ku, Nagoya, Aichi Prefecture
- Fushimi-Inari Station, Fushimi-Momoyama Station - on the Keihan Railway Keihan Main Line (both are located in Fushimi-ku, Kyoto)
