= Momoyamagoryō-mae Station =

Railway station in Kyoto, Japan

Momoyamagoryō-mae Station 桃山御陵前駅
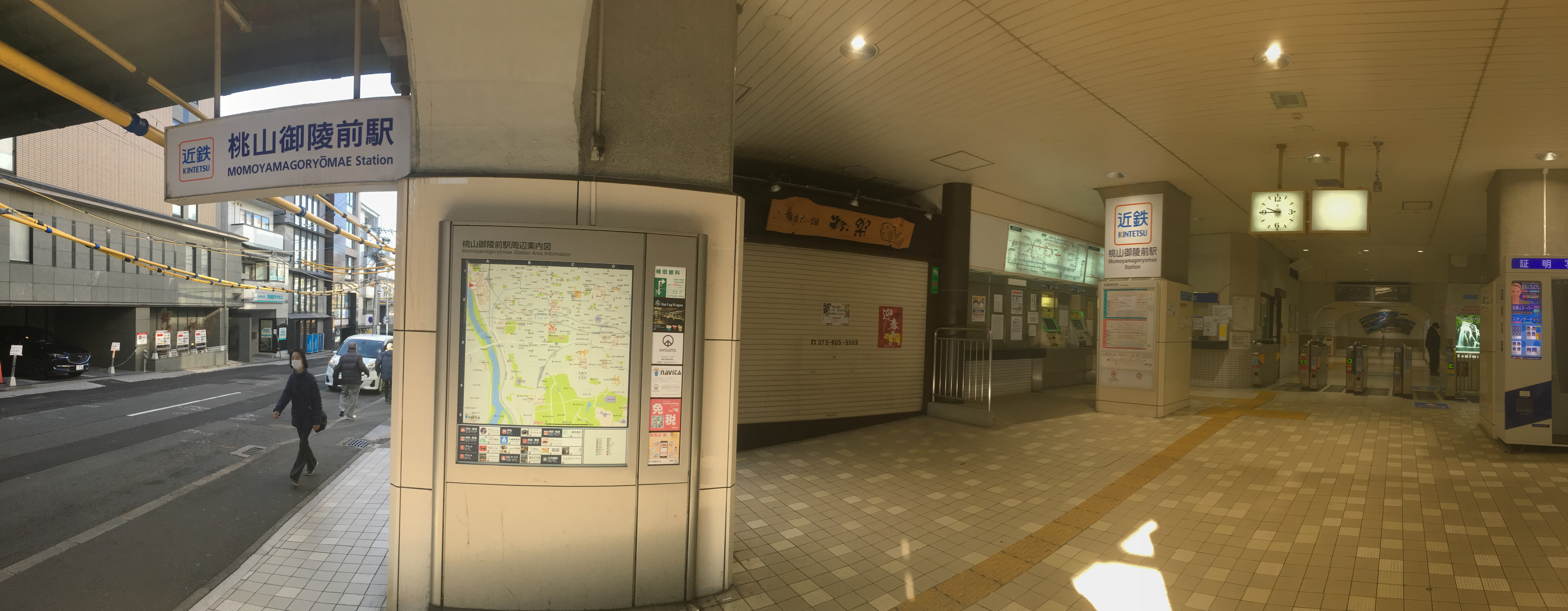
- Station entrance, January 2021

General information
- Location: Kannonjicho, Fushimi-ku, Kyoto-fu, 612-8101; Japan
- Coordinates: 34°56′0.07″N 135°45′55.69″E
- System: Kintetsu Railway commuter rail station
- Owner: Kintetsu Railway
- Operator: Kintetsu Railway
- Line: Kyoto/Kashihara Line
- Distance: 6.5 km from Kyoto
- Platforms: 2 side platforms

Construction
- Structure type: elevated

Other information
- Station code: B08
- Website: Official

History
- Opened: 3 November 1928

Passengers
- FY2015: 5.2 million

Services
Preceding station	Kintetsu Railway	Following station
Kintetsu-Tambabashi towards Kyōto	Kyoto Line Local	Mukaijima towards Yamato-Saidaiji
Kintetsu-Tambabashi towards Kyōto	Kyoto Line Semi-Express	Mukaijima towards Yamato-Saidaiji
Kintetsu-Tambabashi towards Kyōto	Kyoto Line Express	Ōkubo towards Yamato-Saidaiji
Location
- Location within Kyoto Prefecture Location within Japan

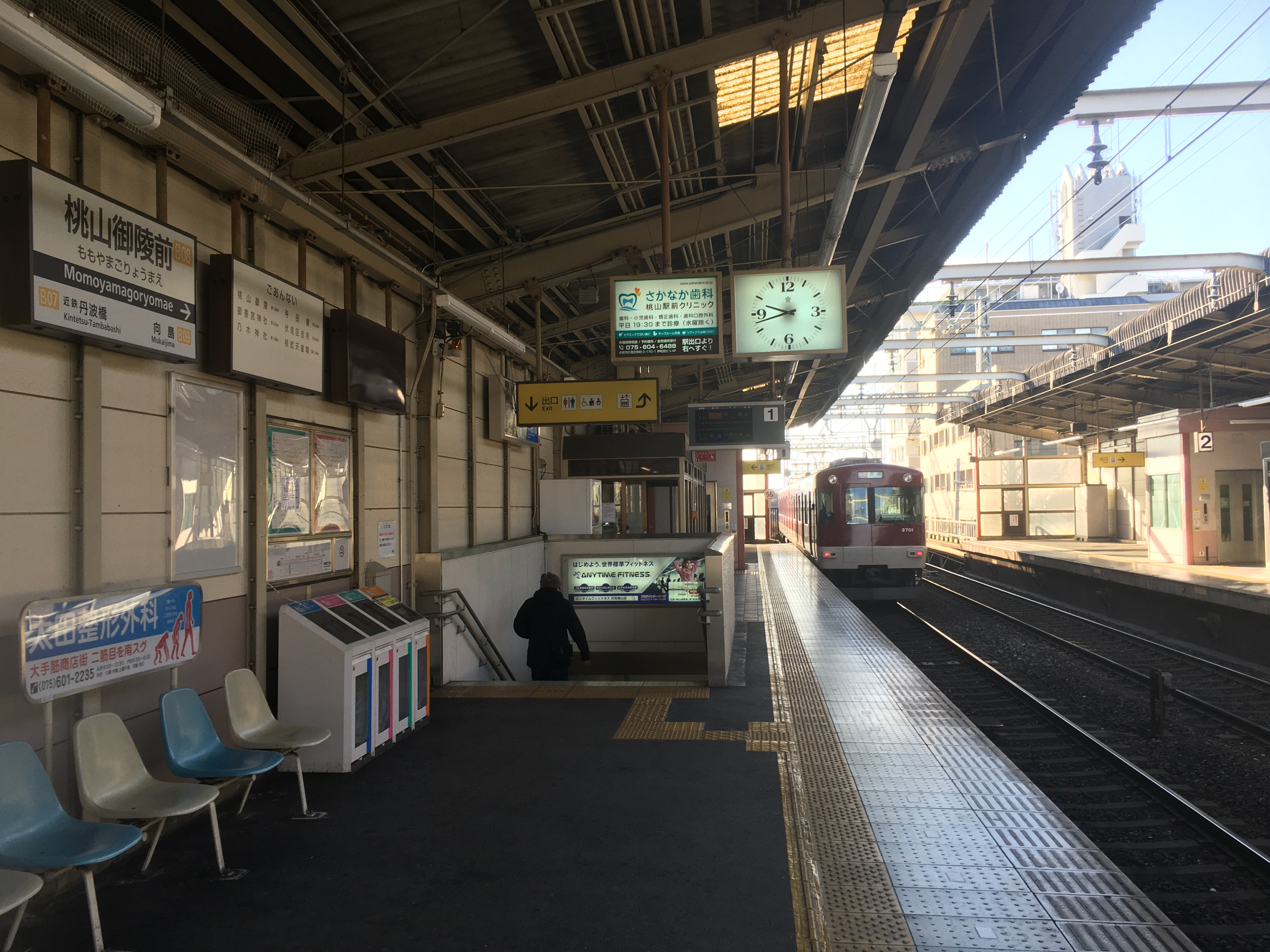
Station platforms, 2021

Momoyamagoryō-mae Station (桃山御陵前駅, Momoyamagoryō-mae-eki) is a passenger railway station located in Fushimi-ku in Kyoto, Japan. It is operated by the private railway operator Kintetsu Railway.It is station number B08.Fushimi-Momoyama Station on the Keihan Main Line and Momoyama Station on the JR Nara Line are within walking distance from Momoyamagoryō-mae Station.

== Lines ==
Momoyamagoryō-mae Station is served by the Kyoto Line, and is located 6.5 kilometers from the terminus of the line at Kyoto Station.

== Station layout ==
The station consists two opposed elevated side platforms, with an effective platform length of six cars.The ticket gates and concourse are on the first floor, and there is only one ticket gate. The station is staffed.

=== Platforms ===
1	■ Kintetsu Kyoto Line	for Kintetsu Nara, Tenri and Kashiharajingu-mae
2	■ Kintetsu Kyoto Line	for Kyoto

== History ==
The station opened on 3 November 1928 as a station of Nara Electric Railroad. Nara Electric Railroad merged with Kintetsu in 1963. In 2007, the station started using PiTaPa.

== Passenger statistics ==
In fiscal 2023, the station was used by an average of 14,606 passengers daily (boarding passengers only).

== Surrounding area ==
- Keihan Main Line Fushimi-Momoyama Station
- JR Nara Line Momoyama Station (approximately 500 meters east)
- Japan National Route 24
- Kyoto Fushimi Ward Office

== See also ==
- List of railway stations in Japan
