= Fushimi-ku =

Ward of Kyoto in Kansai, Japan

Fushimi 伏見区
- Ward of Kyoto
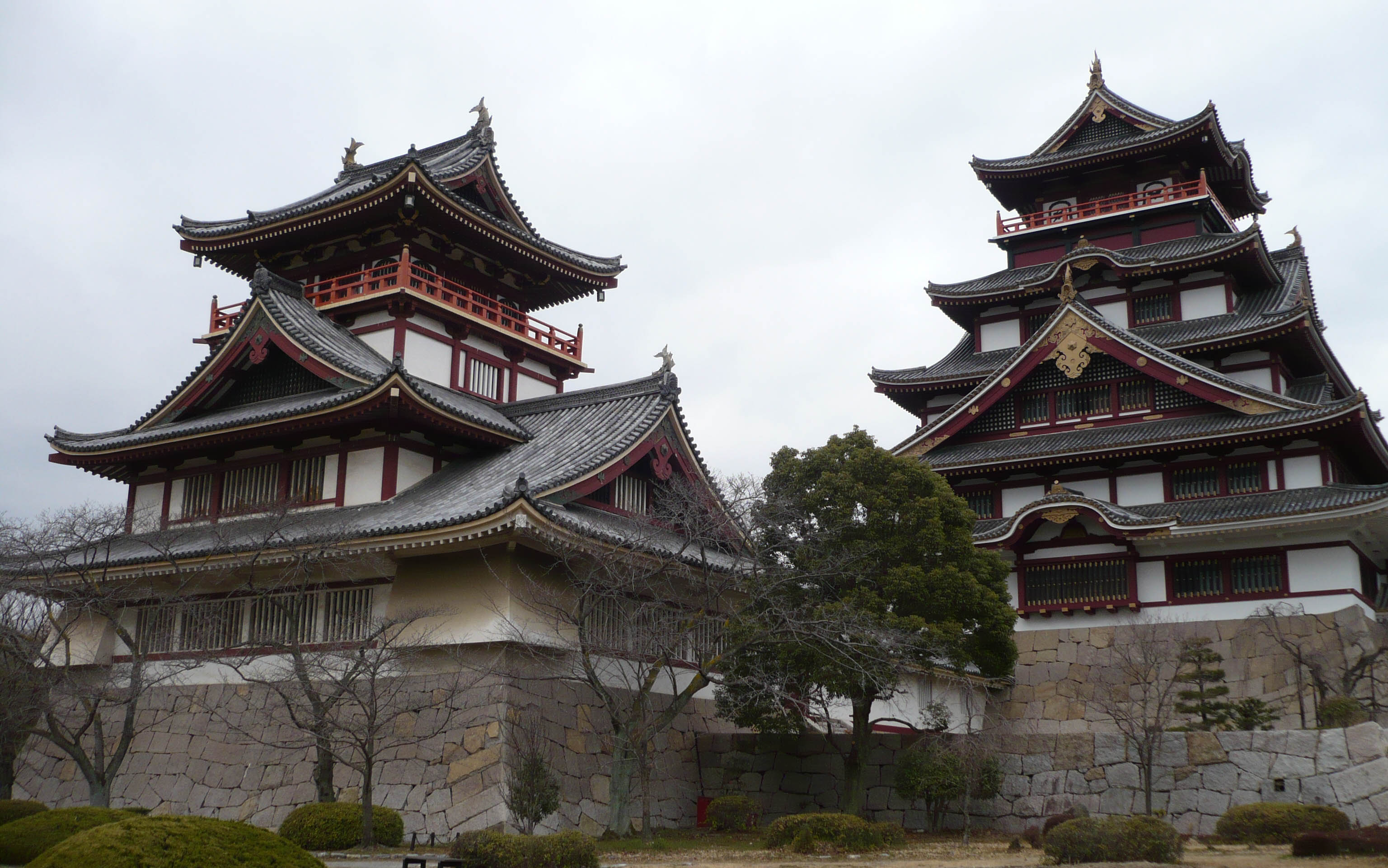
- Fushimi Momoyama Castle

- Location of Fushimi in Kyoto

- Location in Japan
- Coordinates: 34°56′10″N 135°45′41″E
- Country: Japan
- Region: Kinki (Kansai)
- Prefecture: Kyoto
- First official recorded: 473 AD
- Fushimi City Settled: May 1, 1929
- Merger with Kyoto City: April 1, 1931

Area
  - Total: 61.66 km^{2} (23.81 sq mi)

Population (October 1, 2020)
  - Total: 277,858
  - Density: 4,506/km^{2} (11,670/sq mi)
- Time zone: UTC+09:00 (JST)
- City hall address: 681 Higashigumi-chō, Fushimi-ku, Kyoto-shi, Kyoto; 612-8511
- Website: www.city.kyoto.lg.jp/fushimi/

Fushimi (伏見区, Fushimi-ku) is one of the eleven wards in the city of Kyoto, in Kyoto Prefecture, Japan. Famous places in Fushimi include the Fushimi Inari Shrine, with thousands of torii lining the paths up and down a mountain; Fushimi Castle, originally built by Toyotomi Hideyoshi, with its rebuilt towers and gold-lined tea-room; and the Teradaya, an inn at which Sakamoto Ryōma was attacked and injured about a year before his assassination. Also of note is the Gokōgu shrine, which houses a stone used in the construction of Fushimi Castle. The water in the shrine is particularly famous and it is recorded as one of Japan's 100 best clear water spots.

Although written with different characters now, the name Fushimi (which used to be its own "town") originally comes from fusu + mizu, meaning "hidden water" or "underground water". In other words, the location was known for good spring water. The water of Fushimi has particularly soft characteristics, making it an essential component to the particular type of sake brewed in Fushimi. This also explains why the area developed as a sake-brewing center in Kyoto. Today, Fushimi is the second greatest area of Japan in terms of sake production, and is where the sake company Gekkeikan was founded.

== Demographics ==
Historical population
Year	Pop.	±%
1940	92,714	—
1950	105,437	+13.7%
1960	135,293	+28.3%
1970	190,569	+40.9%
1980	257,156	+34.9%
1990	280,276	+9.0%
2000	287,909	+2.7%
2010	284,085	−1.3%
2020	277,858	−2.2%

== Economy ==
The following companies have their headquarters in Fushimi:

- Gekkeikan, a manufacturer of sake, plum wine, shōchū, mirin, and amazake
- Kizakura, a manufacturer of sake and beer
- Kyocera, an electronics and ceramics manufacturer
- Murata Machinery, an industrial machines manufacturer
- Shoutoku, a manufacturer of sake

== Education ==
Ryukoku University, Kyoto University of Education, Shuchiin University, and Temple University, Japan Campus Kyoto are based in the area.

The ward has a North Korean school, Kyoto Korean Elementary School (京都朝鮮初級学校).

- Kyoto Tachibana Junior and Senior High School
  - Kyoto Tachibana Junior High School
  - Kyoto Tachibana Senior High School

== Sights ==
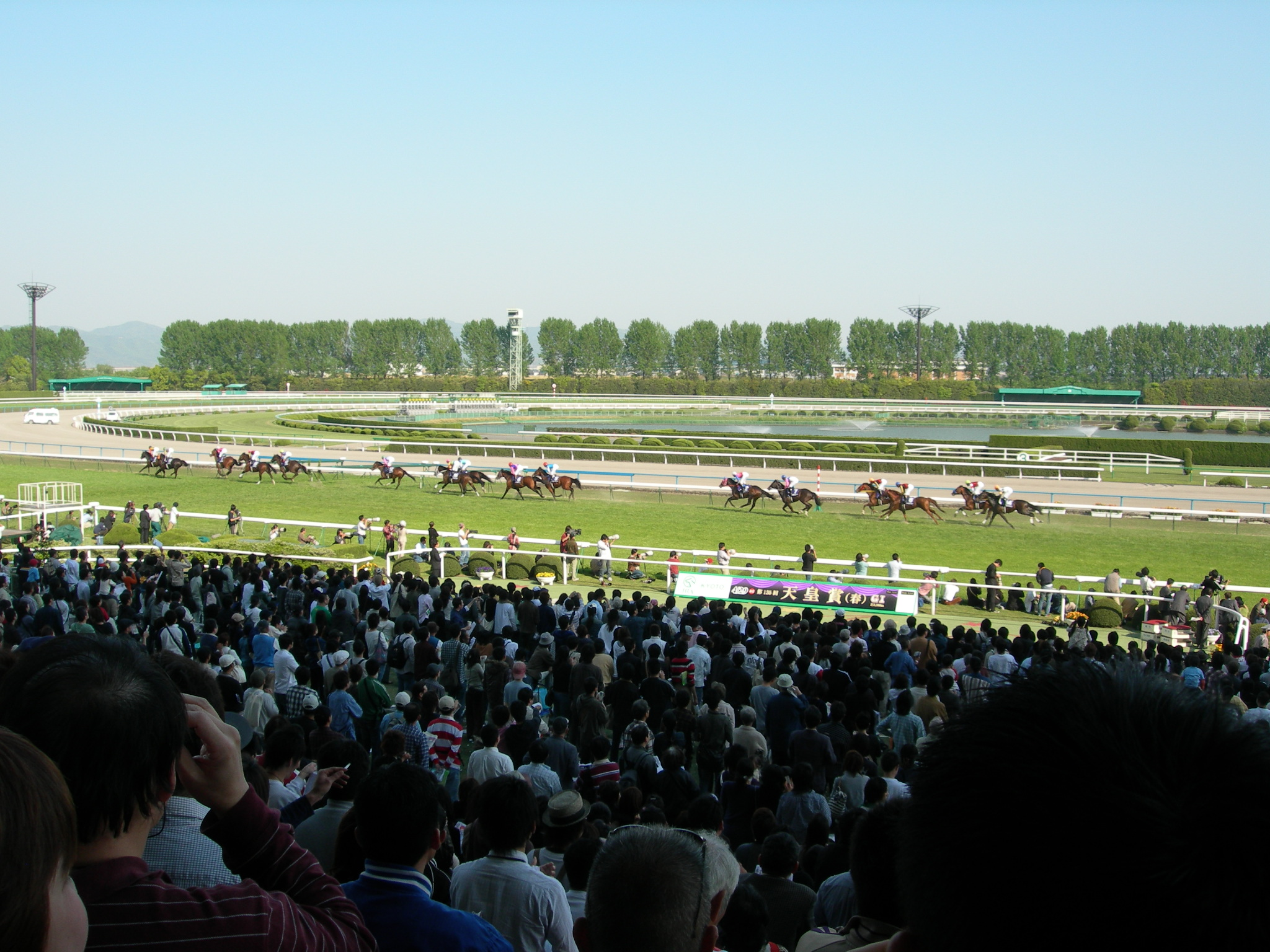
Kyoto Racecourse in 2007

- Daigo-ji – UNESCO World Heritage site
- Emperor Kanmu Tomb
- Emperor Meiji Tomb
- Fushimi Castle-Toyotomi Hideyoshi's castle in Kyoto; also known as Momoyama Castle, one of the namesakes of the Azuchi-Momoyama Period of Japanese history
- Fushimi Inari Shrine – top shrine of largest shrine network in Japan
- Gekkeikan Ōkura Memorial Hall – sake brewing museum
- Kyoto Racecourse

== Famous People ==
- Haruki Murakami - Japanese writer, essayist, marathon runner, award-winning novelist born Fushimi-ku, Kyoto, January 12, 1949.
- Keiyo Aomatsu - Japanese Nippon Professional Baseball player with the Chiba Lotte Marines of Japan's Pacific League
- Kumi Koda - Singer
- Hideki Okajima - Japanese professional baseball pitcher with the Fukuoka SoftBank Hawks

== Transportation ==
=== Train stations ===
- JR West
  - Nara Line
    - Inari
    - JR Fujinomori
    - Momoyama
- Kintetsu Railway
  - Kyoto Line
    - Kamitobaguchi
    - Takeda
    - Fushimi
    - Kintetsu Tambabashi
    - Momoyamagoryomae
    - Mukaijima
- Keihan Electric Railway
  - Keihan Main Line
    - Fushimi-Inari
    - Ryūkokudai-mae-fukakusa
    - Fujinomori
    - Sumizome
    - Tambabashi
    - Fushimi-Momoyama
    - Chūshojima
    - Yodo
  - Uji Line
    - Chūshojima
    - Kangetsukyō
    - Momoyama-minamiguchi
    - Rokujizō
- Kyoto City Subway
  - Karasuma Line
    - Kuinabashi
    - Takeda
  - Tozai Line
    - Daigo
    - Ishida

=== Road ===
- Keiji Bypass
- Meishin Expressway
- Second Keihan Highway (Daini Keihan Road)

== Gallery ==
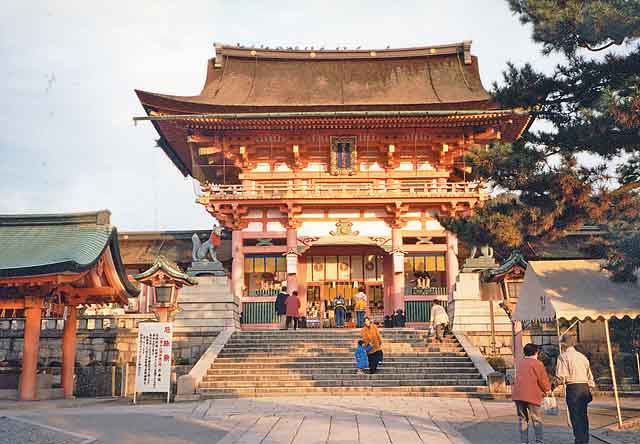
Fushimi Inari Shrine

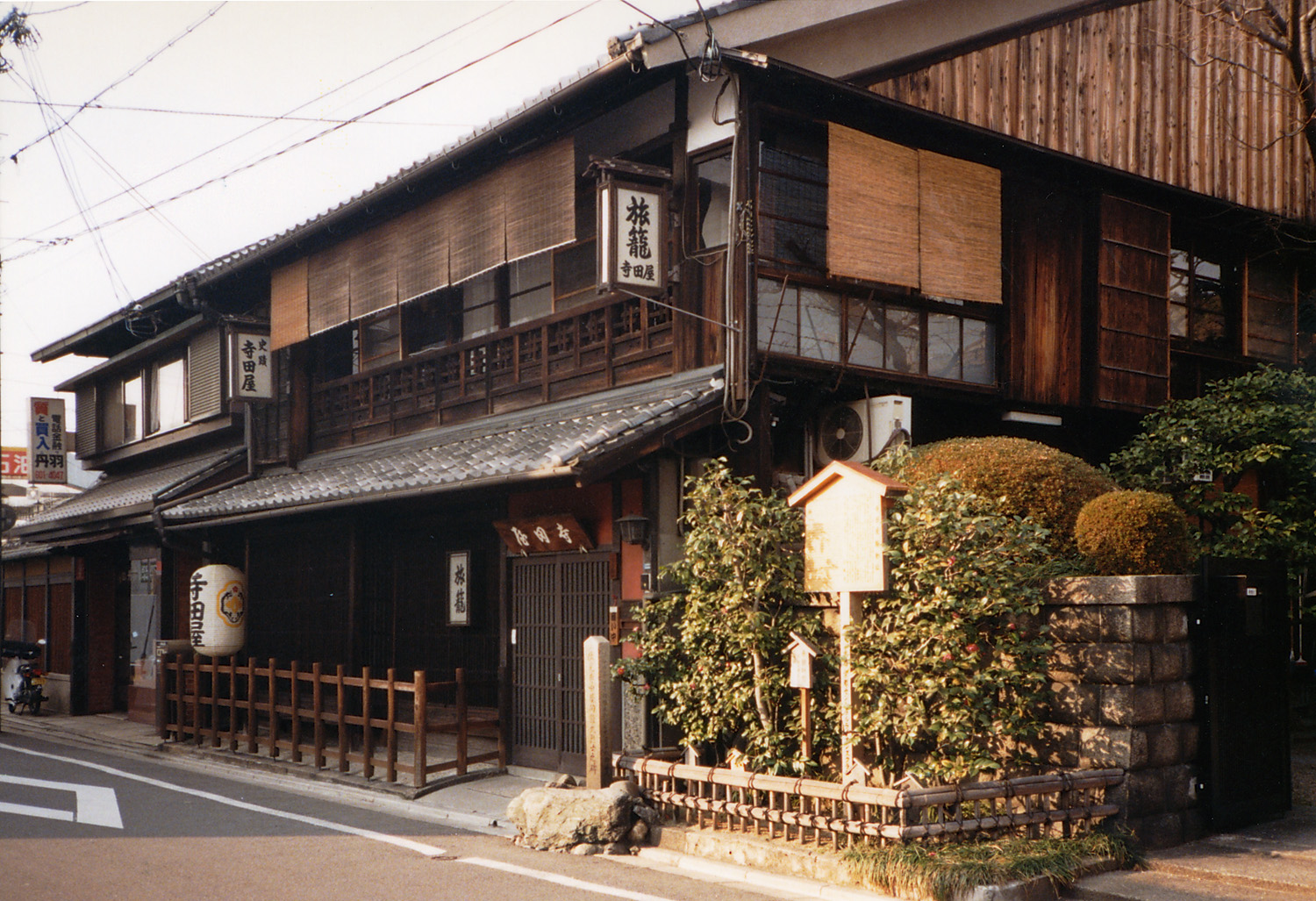
Teradaya

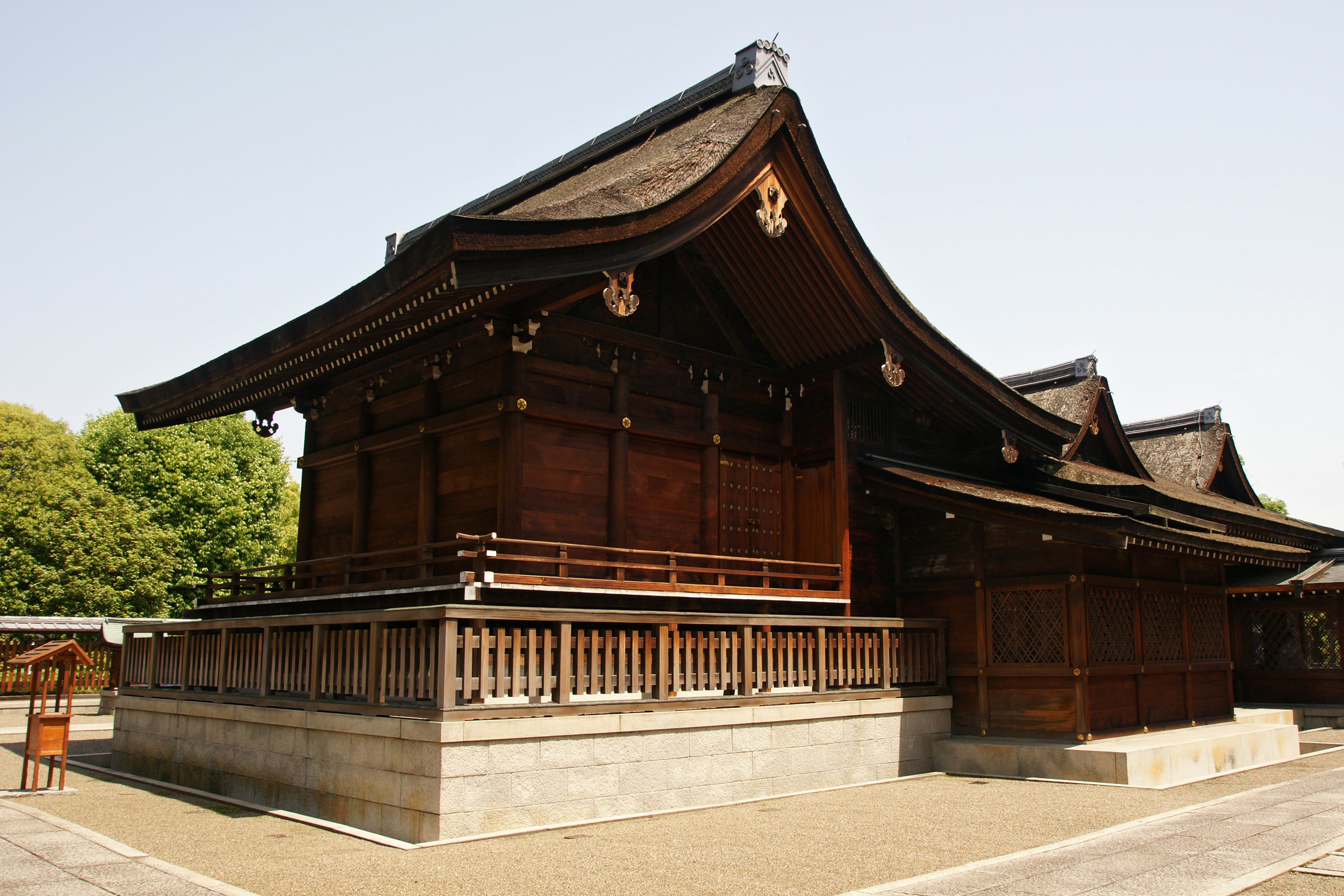
Jōnan-gū

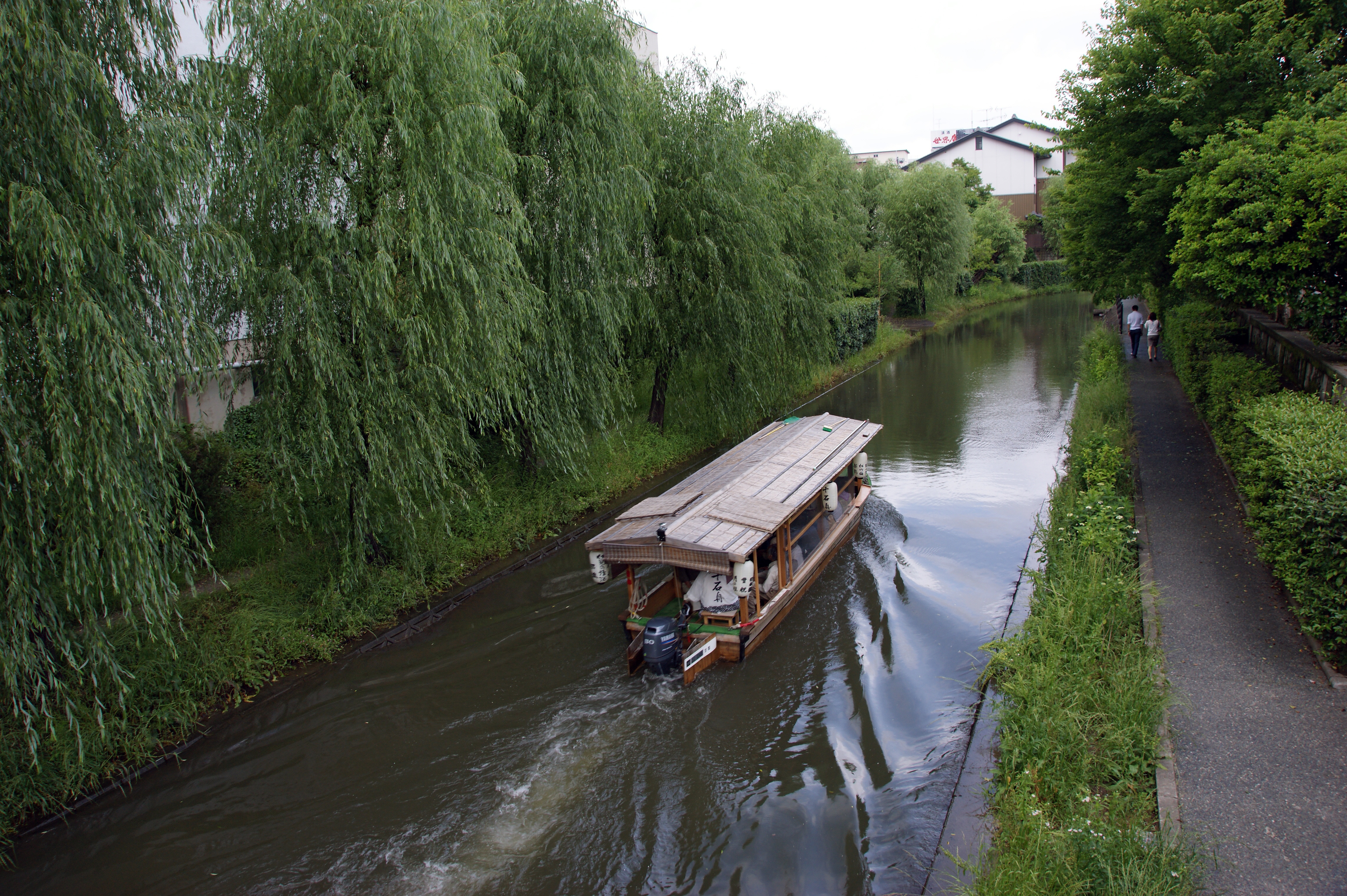
A sightseeing boat in Fushimi Horikawa Canal
