= Jūjō =

Jūjō (十条 or 十條) literally means tenth street in Japanese. It may also refer to:

- Jūjō, Tokyo, a district in Kita-ku, Tokyo, Japan
  - Jūjō Station (Tokyo), a train station on the JR East Saikyō Line in Kita-ku, Tokyo
- Jūjō Street (十条通, Jūjō-dōri), one of several numbered east–west streets in Kyoto, Japan
  - Jūjō Station (Kyoto Municipal Subway), a train station on the Kyoto Municipal Subway Karasuma Line in Minami-ku, Kyoto
  - Jūjō Station (Kintetsu), a train station on the Kintetsu Kyoto Line in Minami-ku, Kyoto
