= JR Fujinomori Station =

Railway station in Kyoto, Japan

JR Fujinomori Station JR藤森駅
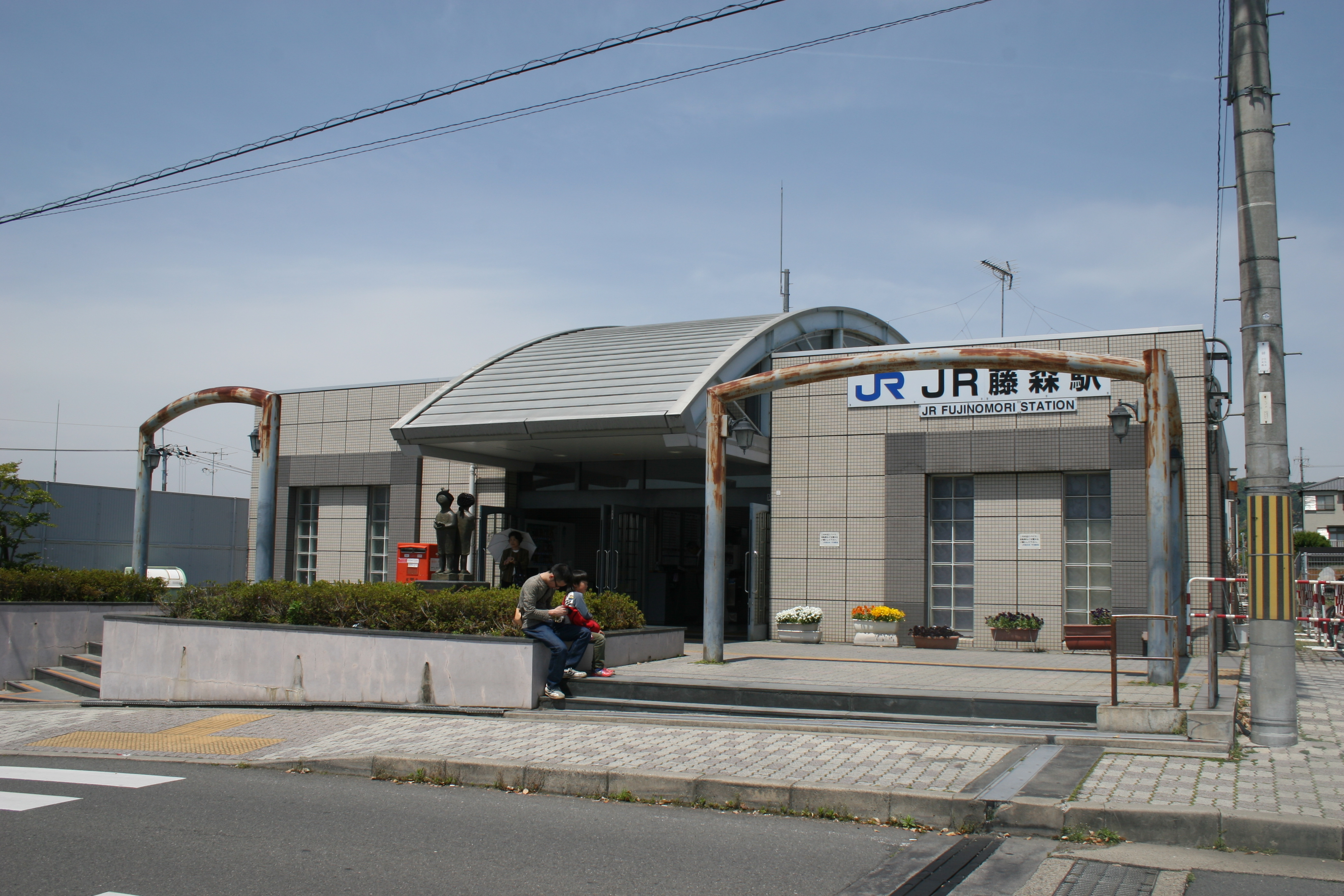
- JR Fujinomori Station in May 2014

General information
- Location: 99, Fukakusa Ōkamedani Ōyama-chō, Fushimi, Kyoto （京都市伏見区深草大亀谷大山町99） Kyoto Prefecture; Japan
- Coordinates: 34°56′54″N 135°46′33″E
- Operator: JR West
- Line: D Nara Line
- Platforms: 2 Side platforms
- Tracks: 2
- Connections: Bus stop

Construction
- Structure type: Ground level
- Accessible: Yes

Other information
- Station code: JR-D04
- Website: Official website

History
- Opened: 8 March 1997

Passengers
- FY 2023: 6,126 daily

Services
Preceding station	JR West	Following station
Inari towards Kyoto	Nara Line Local	Momoyama towards Nara
Location
- Location within Kyoto Prefecture Location within Japan

JR Fujinomori Station (JR藤森駅, JR Fujinomori-eki) is a train station located in Fushimi-ku, Kyoto, Kyoto Prefecture, Japan, operated by West Japan Railway Company (JR West). It has the station number "JR-D04".

== Lines ==
JR Fujinomori Station is served by the Nara Line. The "JR" lettering serves as a distinguishment from Fujinomori Station on the Keihan Main Line. It is the only station of the Japan Railways Group with "JR" in its name since its opening. The stations JR Namba and JR Miyamaki received their "JR" lettering only after they were renamed.

== Layout ==
The station has two side platforms serving two tracks. The ticket office and gates are located upstairs on the ground level. The station does not have a Midori no Madoguchi ticket window, but a POS terminal.

=== Platforms ===
1	■ Nara Line	for Kyōto
2	■ Nara Line	for Uji and Nara

== History ==
JR Fujinomori Station opened on 8 March 1997.

Station numbering was introduced in March 2018 with JR Fujinomori being assigned station number JR-D04.

== Passenger statistics ==
According to the Kyoto Prefecture statistical report, the average number of passengers per day is as follows.

Year	Number of passengers
1999	2,123
2000	2,211
2001	2,342
2002	2,395
2003	2,460
2004	2,537
2005	2,603
2006	2,701
2007	2,759
2008	2,775
2009	2,740
2010	2,753
2011	2,792
2012	2,840
2013	2,937
2014	2,915
2015	2,981
2016	3,038
