= Jūjō Station =

There are multiple train stations in Japan named Jūjō Station:

- Jūjō Station (Tokyo) on the JR East Saikyō Line in Kita-ku, Tokyo
- Jūjō Station (Kintetsu) on the Kintetsu Kyōto Line in Minami-ku, Kyoto
- Jūjō Station (Kyoto Municipal Subway) on the Kyoto Municipal Subway Karasuma Line in Minami-ku, Kyoto
