= Kyoto Line =

Kyoto Line may refer to:

- JR Kyoto Line, a nicknamed railway section of the Tōkaidō Main Line between Ōsaka Station and Kyōto Station
- Kyoto Line (Kintetsu), a railway line connecting Nara and Kyoto
- Hankyū Kyōto Main Line, a railway line connecting Osaka and Kyoto
- San-in Main Line, a part of which built by the Kyoto Railway was once called the Kyoto Line after the railway's nationalization
