= Mukaijima Station =

Railway station in Kyoto, Japan

Mukaijima Station 向島駅
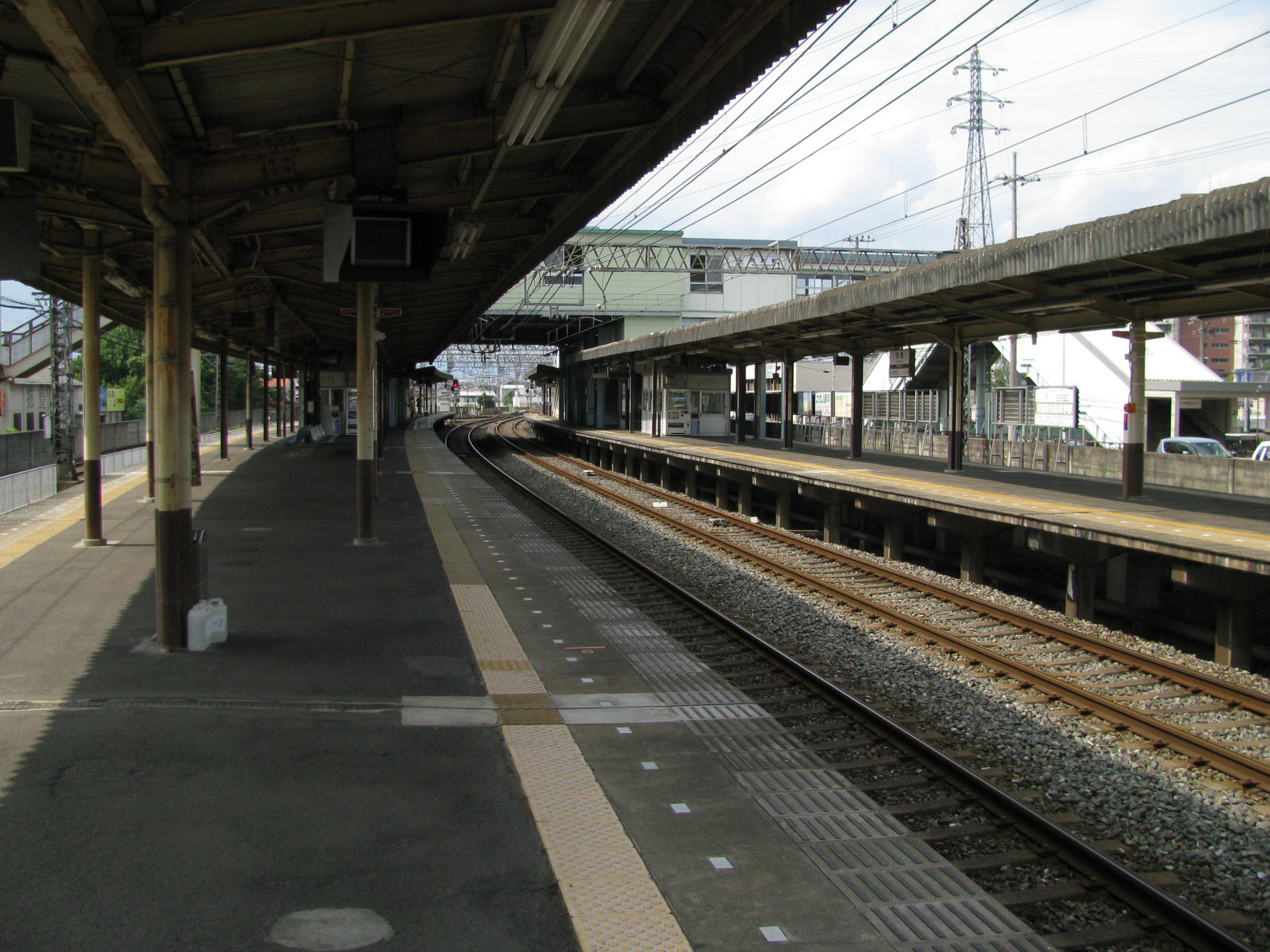
- Mukaijima Station platforms

General information
- Location: Mukaijima Higashijouke, Fushimi-ku, Kyoto-fu, 612-8155; Japan
- Coordinates: 34°54′53.88″N 135°46′10.25″E
- System: Kintetsu Railway commuter rail station
- Owner: Kintetsu Railway
- Operator: Kintetsu Railway
- Line: Kyoto/Kashihara Line
- Distance: 8.6 km from Kyoto
- Platforms: 2 island platforms

Construction
- Structure type: "hashigeta" style

Other information
- Station code: B09
- Website: Official

History
- Opened: 30 March 1979

Passengers
- FY2015: 6.5 million

Services
| Preceding station | Kintetsu Railway | Following station |
|---|---|---|
| Momoyamagoryō-mae towards Kyōto | Kyoto Line Local Semi-Express | Ogura towards Yamato-Saidaiji |
Location
- Location within Kyoto Prefecture Location within Japan

Mukaijima Station (向島駅, Mukaijima-eki) is a passenger railway station located in Fushimi-ku in Kyoto, Japan. It is operated by the private railway operator Kintetsu Railway.It is station number B09.

== Lines ==
Mukaijima Station is served by the Kyoto Line, and is located 8.6 kilometers from the terminus of the line at Kyoto Station.

== Station layout ==
The station consists two island platforms, with an effective platform length of six cars.The platforms are connected by an elevated station building. There are entrances and exits on both the east and west sides, and a bus rotary is located on the east side of the station.The two inner tracks (Platforms 2 and 3) are the main tracks, while the two outer tracks (Platforms 1 and 4) were siding tracks, but were changed to platforms for semi-express and local trains in 2025.

=== Platforms ===
| 1, 2 | ■ Kintetsu Kyoto Line | for Kintetsu Nara, Tenri and Kashiharajingu-mae |
| 3, 4 | ■ Kintetsu Kyoto Line | for Kyoto |

== History ==
The station opened on 30 March 1979.

== Passenger statistics ==
In fiscal 2023, the station was used by an average of 14,554 passengers daily (boarding passengers only).

== Surrounding area ==
- Mukojima New Town
- Shuchiin University
- Kyoto Prefectural Kyoto Subaru High School
- Kyoto Municipal Mukojima Junior High School
- Kyoto Municipal Ninomaru Kita Elementary School

== See also ==
- List of railway stations in Japan
