= Takanohara Station =

Railway station in Nara, Nara Prefecture, Japan

Takanohara Station 高の原駅
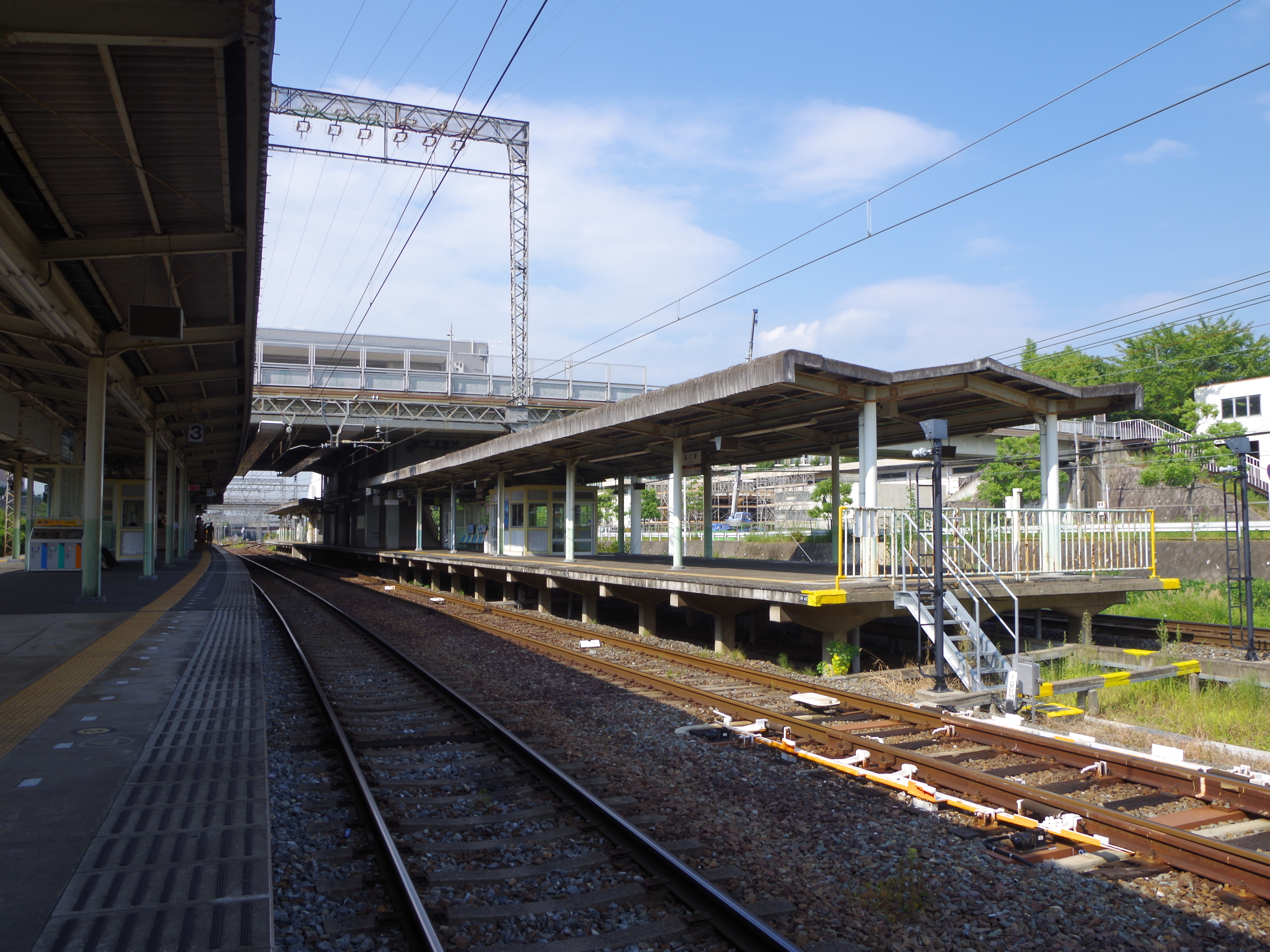
- Takanohara Station in 2013

General information
- Location: 12-3, Suzaku 3-chome, Nara-shi, Nara-ken 631-0806; Japan
- Coordinates: 34°43′25″N 135°47′31″E
- System: Kintetsu Railway commuter rail station
- Owner: Kintetsu Railway
- Operator: Kintetsu Railway
- Line: B Kyoto Line
- Distance: 30.8 km (19.1 miles) from Kyoto
- Platforms: 2 island platforms
- Tracks: 4
- Train operators: Kintetsu Railway
- Connections: Bus terminal

Construction
- Cycle facilities: Available
- Accessible: Yes

Other information
- Station code: B24
- Website: www.kintetsu.co.jp/station/station_info/station05028.html

History
- Opened: 22 November 1972

Passengers
- FY2022: 30,014 daily

Services
Preceding station	Kintetsu Railway	Following station
Yamadagawa towards Kyōto	Kyoto Line Local	Heijō towards Yamato-Saidaiji
Shin-Hōsono towards Kyōto	Kyoto Line Express	Yamato-Saidaiji Terminus
Location

Takanohara Station (高の原駅, Takanohara-eki) is a passenger railway station located in the city of Nara, Nara Prefecture, Japan. It is operated by the private transportation company, Kintetsu Railway.

== Line ==
Takanohara Station is served by the Kyoto Line and is 30.8 kilometers from the starting point of the line at Kyoto.

== Layout ==
The station consists two island platforms and four tracks, and an elevated station building. The outer tracks are for trains that depart and pass through. The effective length of the platform is six cars. There is only one ticket gate. On the Kyoto side, there is a siding for return trains and outgoing trains, and a storage track that extends from platform 2 towards Yamato-Saidaiji. The latter is only used for maintenance vehiclesThe station is staffed.

== Platforms ==
1	■ B Kyoto Line	for Yamato-Saidaiji, Nara, Tenri, and Kashiharajingu-mae
2	■ B Kyoto Line	for Shin-Tanabe, Tambabashi, Kyoto, and Kokusaikaikan

== History ==
Takanohara Station was opened 22 November 1972.

== Passenger statistics ==
In fiscal 2022, the station was used by an average of 30,014 passengers daily (boarding passengers only).

== Surrounding area ==
- Nara University
- Todaiji Junior high school & High school
- Takanohara Central Hospital
- Heijo High school
- Nanyo High school

== See also ==
- List of railway stations in Japan
