= Kamitobaguchi Station =

Railway station in Kyoto, Japan

Kamitobaguchi Station 上鳥羽口駅
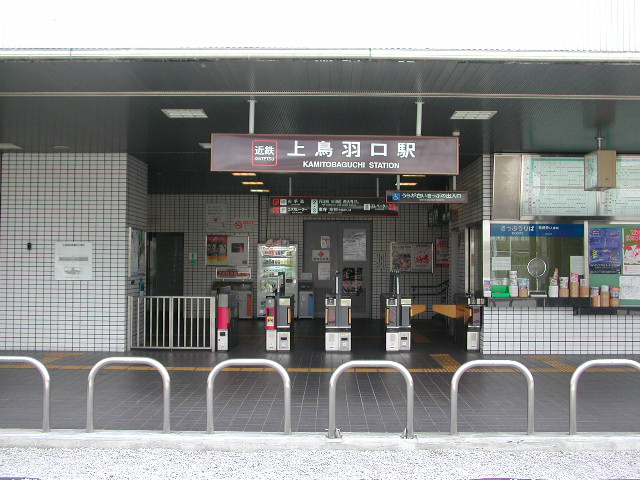
- Gate under elevated platform

General information
- Location: 110 Takeda Mukaishiro-cho Kawacho, Fushimi-ku, Kyoto-fu （京都府京都市伏見区竹田向代町川町110） Japan
- Coordinates: 34°57′55.35″N 135°45′8.84″E
- System: Kintetsu Railway commuter rail station
- Owner: Kintetsu Railway
- Operator: Kintetsu Railway
- Line: Kyoto/Kashihara Line
- Distance: 2.5 km from Kyoto
- Platforms: 1 island platform

Construction
- Structure type: elevated

Other information
- Station code: B04
- Website: Official

History
- Opened: 5 April 1940

Passengers
- FY2015: 2.9 million

Services
Preceding station	Kintetsu Railway	Following station
Jūjō towards Kyōto	Kyoto Line Local	Takeda towards Yamato-Saidaiji
Location
- Location within Kyoto Prefecture Location within Japan

Kamitobaguchi Station (上鳥羽口駅, Kamitobaguchi-eki) is a passenger railway station located in Fushimi-ku in Kyoto, Japan. It is operated by the private railway operator Kintetsu Railway. It is station number B04.

== Lines ==
Kamitobaguchi Station is served by the Kyoto Line, and is located 2.5 kilometers from the terminus of the line at Kyoto Station.

== Station layout ==
The station consists one elevated island platforms, with an effective platform length of six cars. There are passing tracks on both sides. The effective platform length is long enough for six cars. The ticket gates and concourse are on the first floor, and the platform is on the second floor. There is only one ticket gate. The station is staffed.

=== Platforms ===
2	■ Kintetsu Kyoto Line	for Kashiharajingu-mae
3	■ Kintetsu Kyoto Line	for Kyoto

== History ==
The station opened on 5 April 1940 as a station of Nara Electric Railroad. The Nara Electric Railroad merged with Kintetsu in 1963. In 2007, the station started using PiTaPa.

== Passenger statistics ==
In fiscal 2023, the station was used by an average of 7,577 passengers daily (boarding passengers only).

== Surrounding area ==
Kyoto Detention House

- Kuzabashi Street
- Aburakoji Street
- Nintendo
- Yasaka Bus Depot
- Kyoto Bus Rakunan Office

== See also ==
- List of railway stations in Japan
