= Sumizome Station =

Railway station in Kyoto, Japan

Sumizome Station 墨染駅
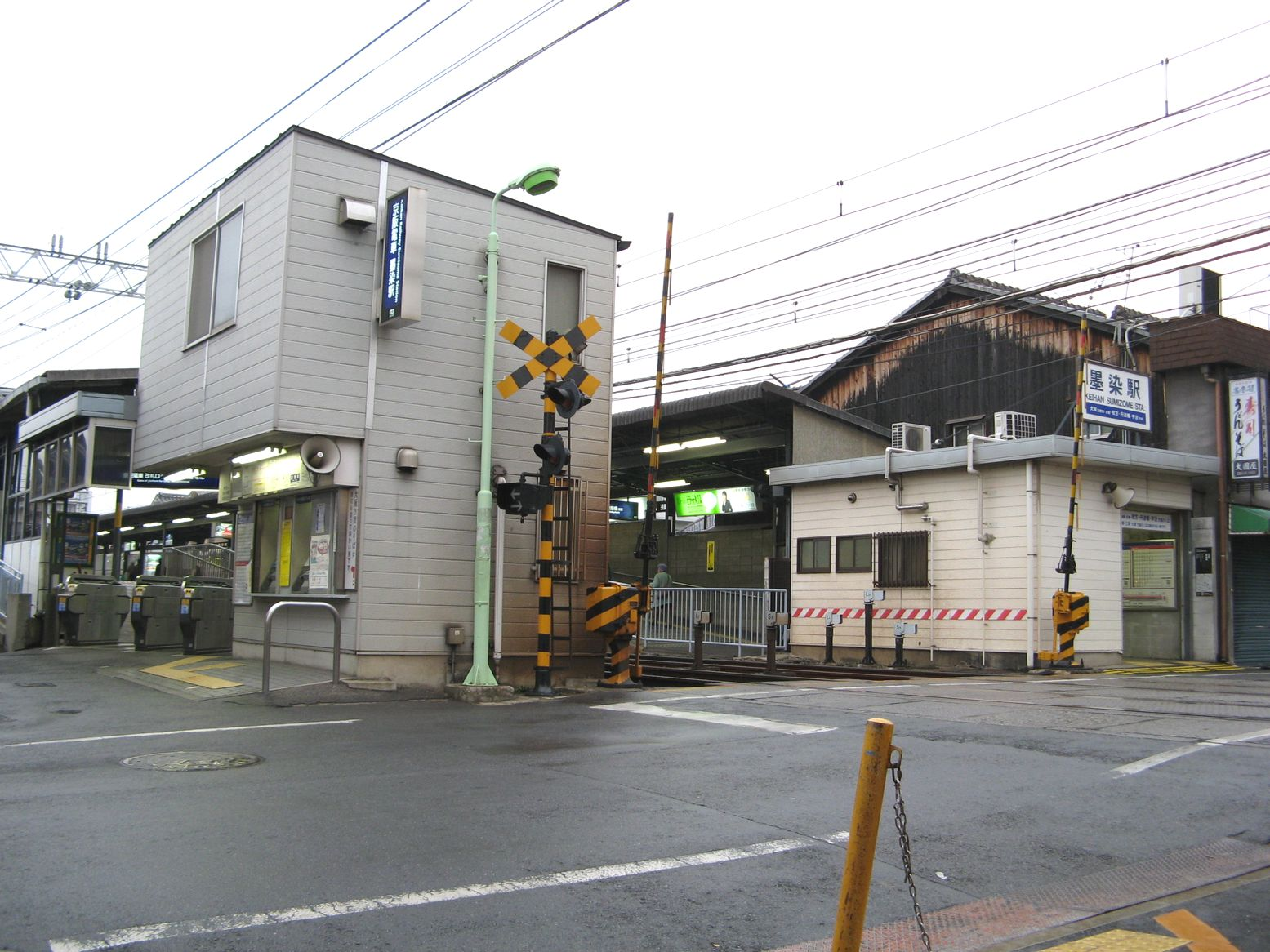
- Sumizome Station

General information
- Location: Fushimi-ku, Kyoto; Kyoto Prefecture; Japan
- Coordinates: 34.9483°N 135.7691°E
- Operator: Keihan Electric Railway
- Line: Keihan Main Line
- Distance: 42.3 km from Yodoyabashi
- Platforms: 2
- Tracks: 2

Construction
- Structure type: At-grade

Other information
- Station code: KH31
- Website: Official (in Japanese)

History
- Opened: 1910; 116 years ago

Passengers
- FY2015: 3.1 million
Location

Sumizome Station (墨染駅, Sumizome-eki) is a train station located in Fushimi-ku, Kyoto, Kyoto Prefecture, Japan.

== Lines ==
- Keihan Electric Railway
  - Keihan Main Line

== Adjacent stations ==
«	Service	»
Keihan Railway Keihan Main Line
Rapid Limited Express for Demachiyanagi (in the evening on weekdays): Does not stop at this station
Limited Express: Does not stop at this station
Commuter Rapid Express for Nakanoshima (in the morning on weekdays): Does not stop at this station
Rapid Express: Does not stop at this station
Express: Does not stop at this station
Tambabashi	Commuter Sub Express for Yodoyabashi or Nakanoshima (in the morning on weekdays)	Fujinomori
Tambabashi	Sub Express	Fujinomori
Tambabashi	Local	Fujinomori
