= Ogura Station =

Railway station in Uji, Kyoto Prefecture, Japan

Ogura Station 小倉駅
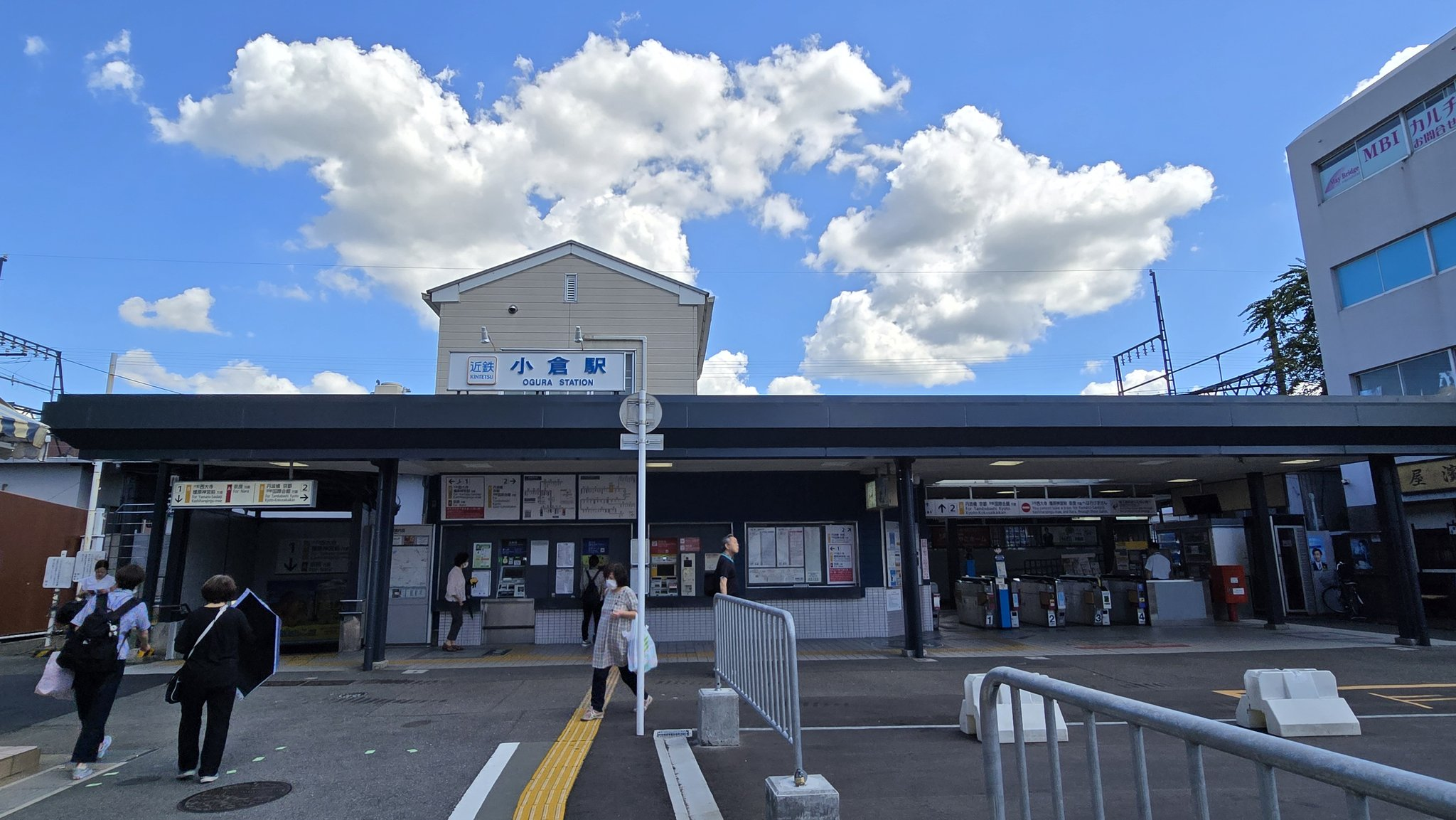
- Ogura Station west exit, 2025

General information
- Location: Kaguraden Oguracho, Uji-shi, Kyoto-fu 611-0042; Japan
- Coordinates: 34°53′35.64″N 135°46′54.33″E
- System: Kintetsu Railway commuter rail station
- Owner: Kintetsu Railway
- Operator: Kintetsu Railway
- Line: Kyoto/Kashihara Line
- Distance: 11.4 km from Kyoto
- Platforms: 2 side platforms

Other information
- Station code: B10
- Website: www.kintetsu.co.jp/station/station_info/station05014.html

History
- Opened: 3 November 1928
- Former names: Naraden Ogura (1930-1963)

Passengers
- FY2023: 13,342

Services
Preceding station	Kintetsu Railway	Following station
Mukaijima towards Kyōto	Kyoto Line Local Semi-Express	Iseda towards Yamato-Saidaiji
Location
- Location within Kyoto Prefecture Location within Japan

Ogura Station (小倉駅, Ogura-eki) is a passenger railway station located in the city of Uji, Kyoto, Japan. It is operated by the private railway operator Kintetsu Railway. The station number is B10. It is the closest station to the old Nintendo Uji Ogura Plant, which is the site of the Nintendo Museum.

== Lines ==
Ogura Station is served by the Kyoto Line, and is located 11.4 kilometers from the terminus of the line at Kyoto Station.

== Station layout ==
The station consists two opposed side platforms, with an effective platform length of six cars. Because there are no overpasses or underpasses connecting the two platforms, each has its own ticket gate and restroom (though there is a pedestrian-only underground passage outside the ticket gates). The station is staffed.

=== Platforms ===
1	■ Kintetsu Kyoto Line	for Kintetsu Nara, Tenri and Kashiharajingu-mae
2	■ Kintetsu Kyoto Line	for Kyoto

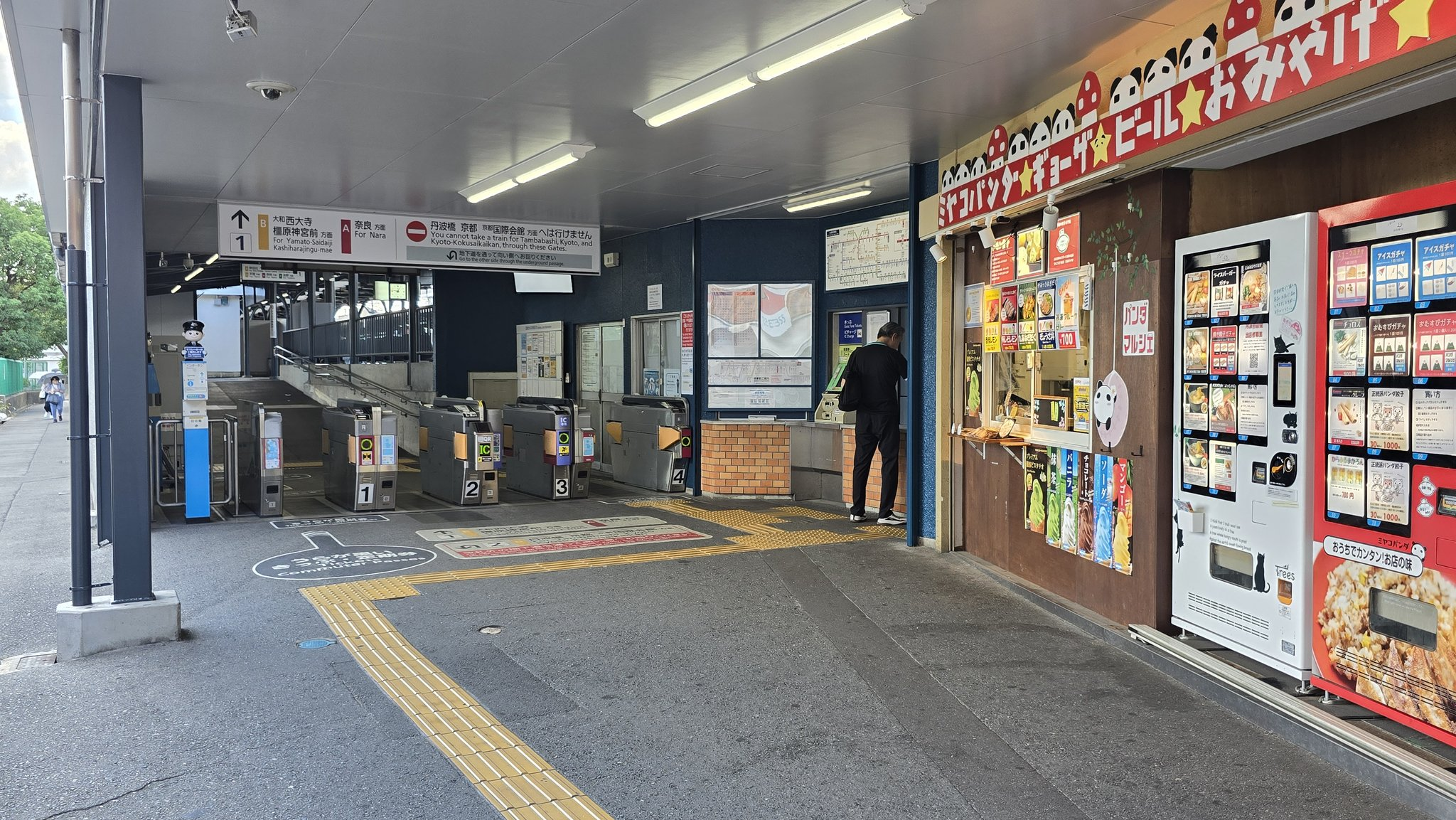
East Exit, September 2024

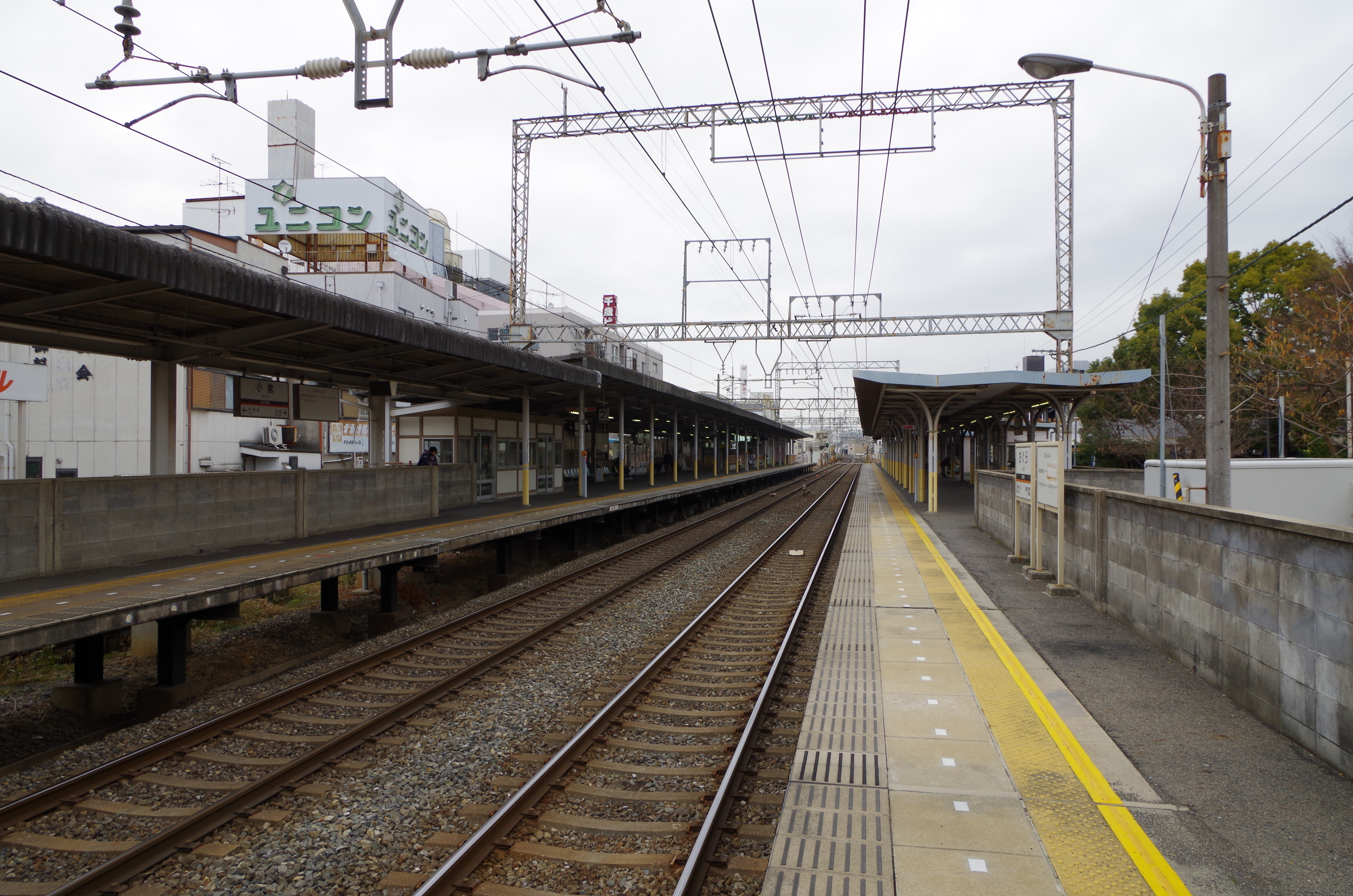
Platforms

== History ==
The station opened on 3 November 1928 as a station of Nara Electric Railroad. It was renamed Naraden Ogura Station (奈良電小倉駅) on 1 April 1930. Nara Electric Railroad merged with Kintetsu on 1 October 1963, and the station reverted to its original name. In 2007, the station started using PiTaPa.

== Passenger statistics ==
In fiscal 2023, the station was used by an average of 13,342 passengers daily (boarding passengers only).

== Surrounding area ==
- Uji City Minami-Kokura Elementary School
- Uji City Nishi-Kokura Elementary School
- Uji City Kita-Kokura Elementary School
- Uji City Nishi-Kokura Junior High School

== See also ==
- List of railway stations in Japan
