= Iseda Station =

Railway station in Uji, Kyoto Prefecture, Japan

Iseda Station 伊勢田駅
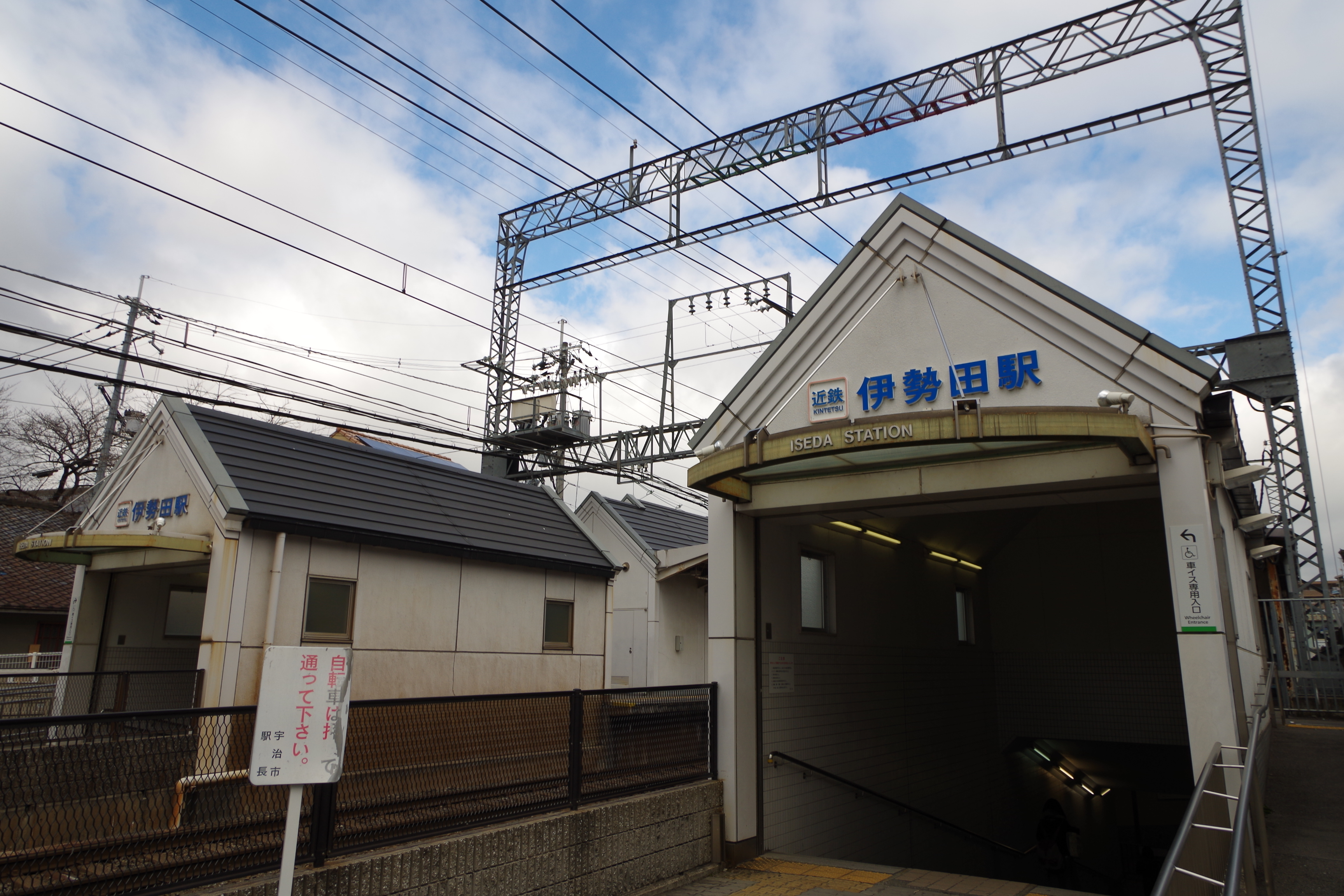
- Iseda Station in 2013

General information
- Location: Nakayama Isedacho, Uji-shi, Kyoto-fu 611-0043; Japan
- Coordinates: 34°52′54.3″N 135°46′43.53″E
- System: Kintetsu Railway commuter rail station
- Owner: Kintetsu Railway
- Operator: Kintetsu Railway
- Line: Kyoto/Kashihara Line
- Distance: 12.7 km from Kyoto
- Platforms: 2 side platforms
- Connections: Bus terminal

Other information
- Station code: B11
- Website: Official

History
- Opened: 3 November 1928

Passengers
- FY2023: 6265

Services
Preceding station	Kintetsu Railway	Following station
Ogura towards Kyōto	Kyoto Line Local Semi-Express	Ōkubo towards Yamato-Saidaiji
Location
- Location within Kyoto Prefecture Location within Japan

Iseda Station (伊勢田駅, Iseda-eki) is a passenger railway station located in the city of Uji, Kyoto, Japan. It is operated by the private railway operator Kintetsu Railway.It is station number B11.

== Lines ==
Momoyamagoryō-mae Station is served by the Kyoto Line, and is located 12.7 kilometers from the terminus of the line at Kyoto Station.

== Station layout ==
The station consists two opposed side platforms, with an effective platform length of six cars.The ticket gates and concourse are underground, while the platforms are above ground, with station entrances on both platforms. The station is unattended.

=== Platforms ===
1	■ Kintetsu Kyoto Line	for Kintetsu Nara, Tenri and Kashiharajingu-mae
2	■ Kintetsu Kyoto Line	for Kyoto

== History ==
The station opened on 3 November 1928 as a station of Nara Electric Railroad. Nara Electric Railroad merged with Kintetsu in 1963. In 2007, the station started using PiTaPa.

== Passenger statistics ==
In fiscal 2023, the station was used by an average of 6,265 passengers daily (boarding passengers only).

== Surrounding area ==
- Ground Self-Defense Force Okubo Garrison Self-Defense Force Barracks
- Uji City Nishiuji Junior High School

== See also ==
- List of railway stations in Japan
