= Keiyo Aomatsu =

Japanese baseball player (born 1986)

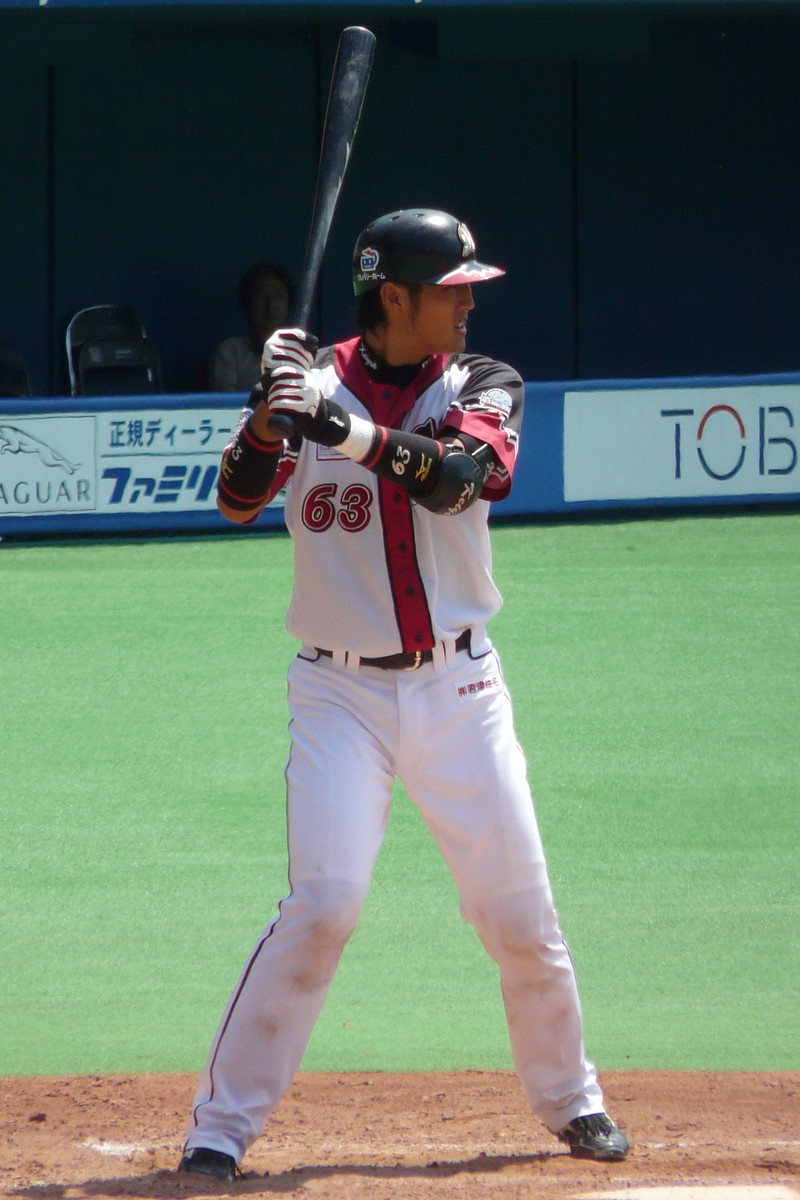
- Aomatsu with the Chiba Lotte Marines
- First baseman
- Born: December 7, 1986 (age 39); Kyoto, Japan
- Bats: Right Throws: Right

debut
- September 26, 2006, for the Chiba Lotte Marines

NPB statistics
- Batting average: .214
- Home runs: 1
- RBI: 5
- Stats at Baseball Reference

Teams
- Chiba Lotte Marines (2006, 2013–2015)

Keiyo Aomatsu (青松 敬鎔, Aomatsu Keiyo; born December 7, 1986) is a former Japanese Nippon Professional Baseball player with the Chiba Lotte Marines of Japan's Pacific League.
