= Shuchiin University =

Private university in Fushimi-ku,

- 種智院大学
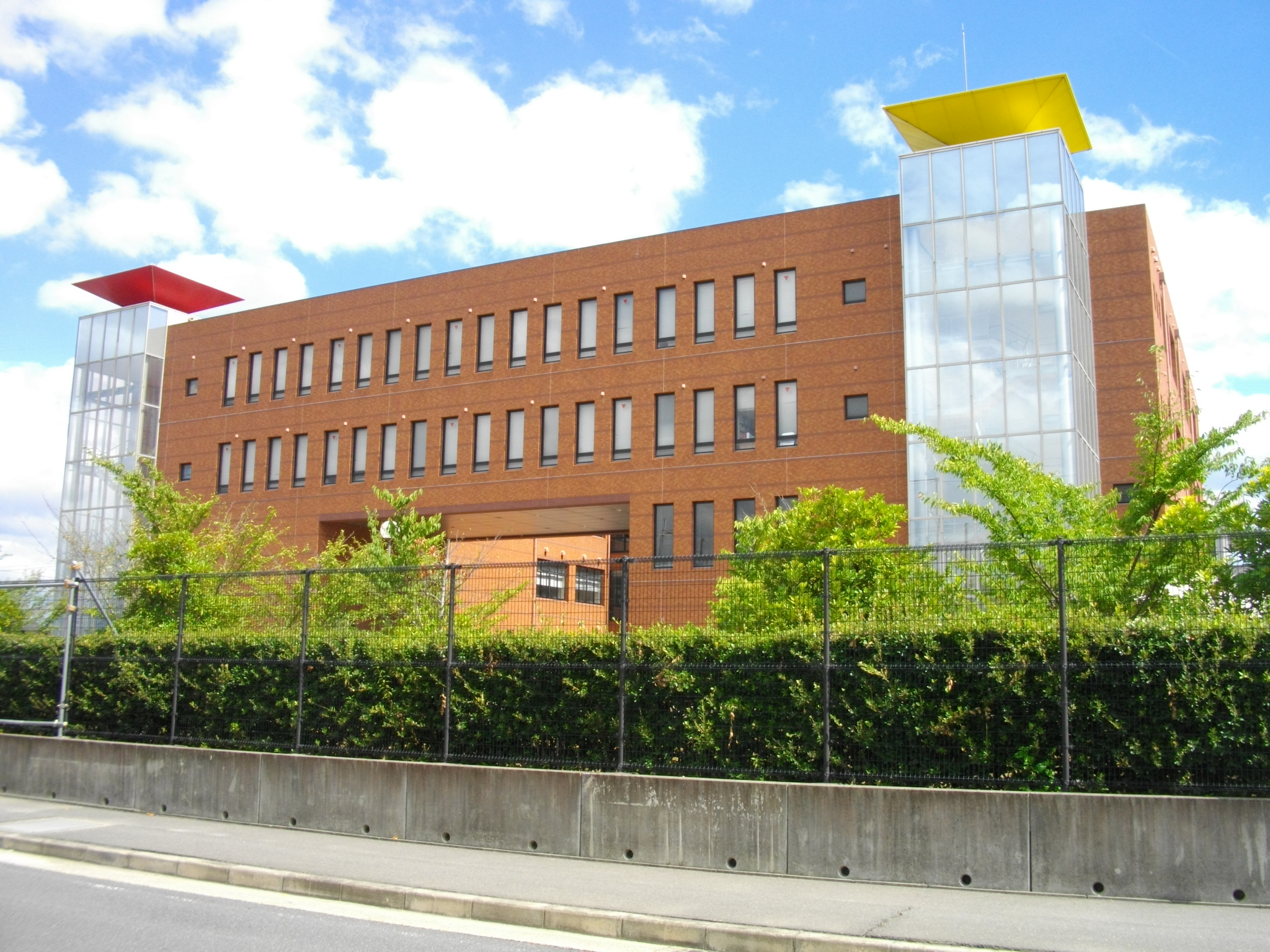
- Shuchiin University building
- Type: Private
- Established: 828 (chartered 1949)
- President: Suguri Kozui (村主 康瑞)
- Academic staff: 54
- Students: 179
- Location: Kyoto, Kyoto, Japan; 34°54′50″N 135°45′57″E
- Website: www.shuchiin.ac.jp

Shuchiin University (種智院大学, Shuchiin daigaku) is a private university in Fushimi-ku, Kyoto, Kyoto, Japan, established in 1949.

The university is operated by the educational corporation Sōgei Shuchiin and consists of two departments within the Faculty of Humanities: the Department of Buddhist Studies and the Department of Social Welfare. It is affiliated with the Shingon Buddhist tradition. Fourteen head temples of the Kogi Shingon (Old Shingon) school—Ninna-ji, Hōzan-ji, Chōgosonshi-ji, Kanshū-ji, Daikaku-ji, Daigo-ji, Nakayama-dera, Saidai-ji, Kyōōgokoku-ji (Tō-ji), Seichō-ji, Sennyū-ji, Zentsū-ji, Suma-dera, and Zuishin-in—take part in its administration. In addition, three branches of Shingon Buddhism, namely the Chizan school, the Buzan school, and the Shingi Shingon school, cooperate in promoting education.

The name of the university comes from the Sōgei Shuchiin, an educational institution founded by Kūkai (Kōbō Daishi) in 828 (Tenchō 5). In April 2011, the administration of Rakunan High School and its affiliated junior high school, previously operated by the Shingon Buddhism Kyoto Academy, was transferred to the Shingon Buddhism Rakunan Academy, and the corporate name was changed to Sōgei Shuchiin Educational Corporation. In addition, several temples, including Ishiyama-dera, Kokubun-ji, Shippōryū-ji, Jingo-ji, Heiken-ji, Maegami-dera, and Murō-ji, joined as temples supporting its management.

In the Department of Buddhist Studies, students study Buddhism with a focus on Shingon esoteric teachings. In the Department of Social Welfare, students are eligible upon graduation to take the national examinations to become licensed social workers and certified psychiatric social workers.
