= Fujinomori Station =

Railway station in Kyoto, Japan

Fujinomori Station 藤森駅
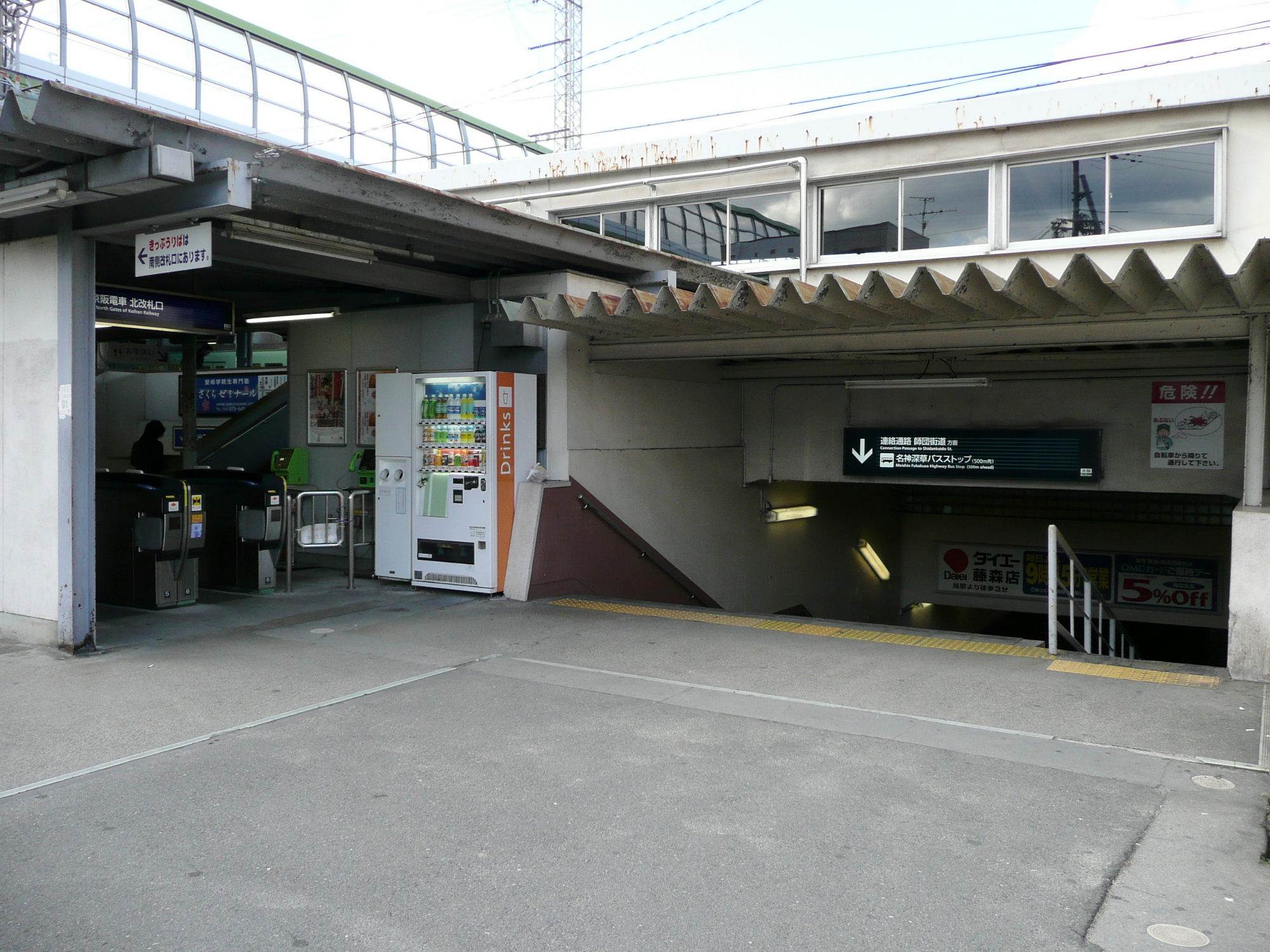
- The north gate of Fujinomori Station.

General information
- Location: Fushimi-ku, Kyoto; Kyoto Prefecture; Japan
- Coordinates: 34.9566°N 135.7702°E
- Operator: Keihan Electric Railway
- Line: Keihan Main Line
- Distance: 43.3 km from Yodoyabashi
- Platforms: 2
- Tracks: 4
- Connections: Kyōto Fukakusa Bus stop (Meishin Expressway)

Construction
- Structure type: At-grade

Other information
- Station code: KH32
- Website: Official (in Japanese)

History
- Opened: 1910; 116 years ago

Passengers
- FY2015: 5.7 million
Location

Fujinomori Station (藤森駅, Fujinomori-eki) is a train station located in Fushimi-ku, Kyoto, Kyoto Prefecture, Japan.

== Lines ==
- Keihan Electric Railway
  - Keihan Main Line

== Surroundings ==
- Meishin Expressway Kyoto-Fukakusa Bus stop (Express Transit bus for Tokyo, Yokohama, Nagano, Niigata, Nagoya, Kanazawa, Toyama, Fukui, Gifu Arrives)

== Adjacent stations ==
«	Service	»
Keihan Railway Keihan Main Line
Rapid Limited Express for Demachiyanagi (in the evening on weekdays): Does not stop at this station
Limited Express: Does not stop at this station
Commuter Rapid Express for Nakanoshima (in the morning on weekdays): Does not stop at this station
Rapid Express: Does not stop at this station
Express: Does not stop at this station
Sumizome	Commuter Sub Express for Yodoyabashi or Nakanoshima (in the morning on weekdays)	Ryūkokudai-mae-fukakusa
Sumizome	Sub Express	Ryūkokudai-mae-fukakusa
Sumizome	Local	Ryūkokudai-mae-fukakusa
