= Kyoto Line (Kintetsu) =

Railway line in Japan

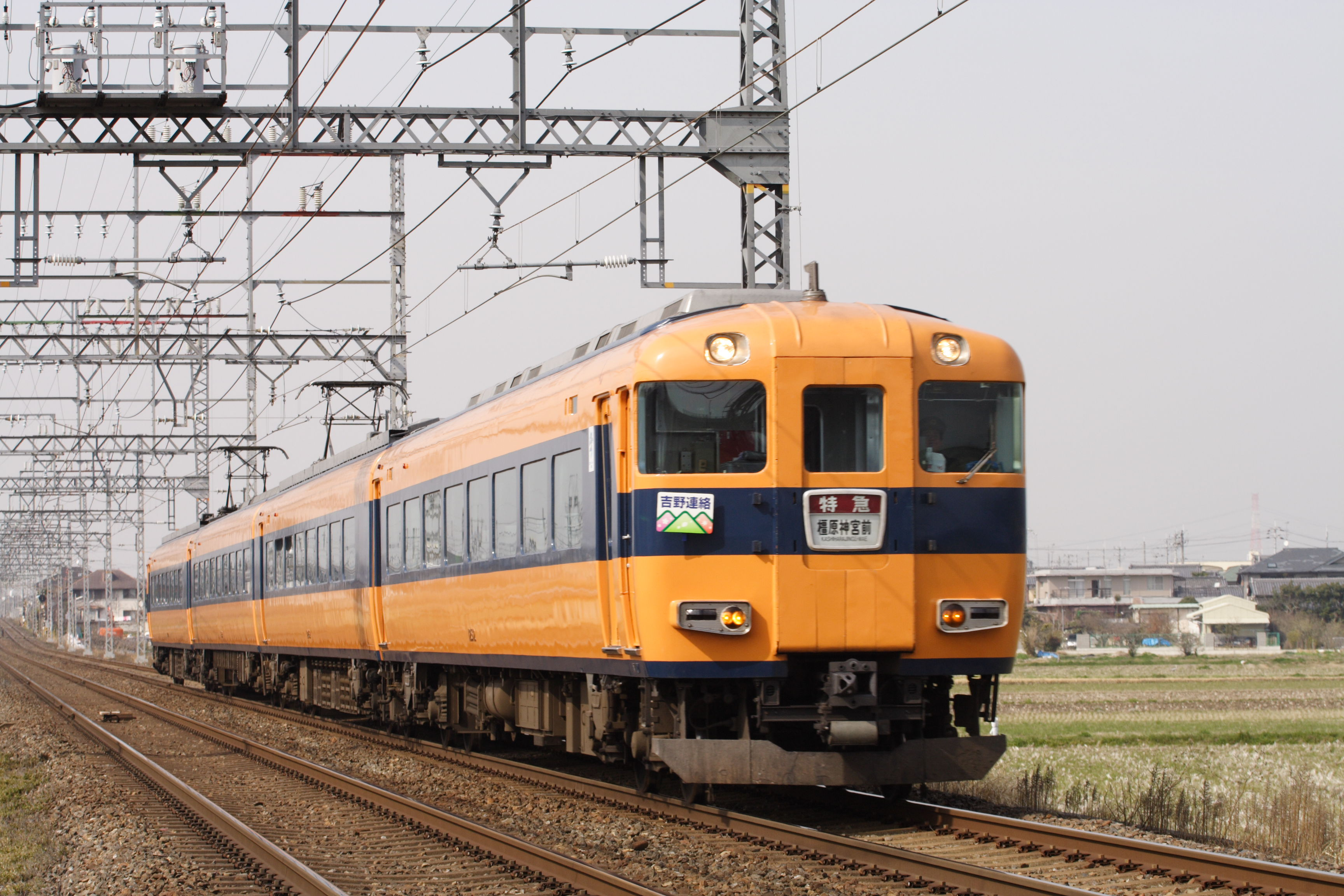
- A limited express train

Overview
- Native name: 京都線
- Owner: Kintetsu Railway
- Line number: B
- Locale: Kyoto Prefecture; Nara Prefecture
- Termini: Kyoto; Yamato-Saidaiji
- Stations: 26
- Color on map

Service
- Type: Heavy rail; Commuter rail
- System: Kintetsu Railway
- Operator: Kintetsu Railway
- Depots: Shin-Tanabe; Saidaiji; Miyazu

History
- Opened: 3 November 1928; 97 years ago

Technical
- Line length: 34.6 km (21.5 mi)
- Number of tracks: 2
- Character: Heavy rail; Commuter rail
- Track gauge: 1,435 mm (4 ft 8 1/2 in) standard gauge
- Electrification: Overhead line, 1,500 V DC
- Operating speed: 105 km/h (65 mph)
- Signalling: Automatic closing block
- Train protection system: Kintetsu ATS, ATS-SP

The Kyoto Line (京都線, Kyōto sen) is a Japanese railway line owned and operated by the Kintetsu Railway, a private railway operator. It connects the cities of Kyoto, Uji, and Nara, and competes with the Nara Line of West Japan Railway Company (JR-West), which also connects those cities.

Many trains on the line continue to the Nara Line to Kintetsu Nara Station or the Kashihara Line via Yamato-Saidaiji Station. The line also provides the through train services with the Karasuma Line of Kyoto Municipal Subway.

== History ==
The Kyoto Line was built by Nara Electric Railway (奈良電気鉄道, Nara Denki Tetsudō) in November 1928 as dual track electrified at 600 V DC. The track between Kyoto Station and Horiuchi Station (present-day Kintetsu-Tambabashi Station) was placed on the site of a removed railway, which had been rerouted and is now called the JR Nara Line.

The railway provided the through services to the lines of Kintetsu (originally, Osaka Electric Tramway) from the beginning. As of September 1961, Kintetsu was the largest shareholder of Nara Electric Railway with 980,000 shares out of the company's 1.9 million shares, while Keihan Electric Railway owned 710,000 shares. Through a deal between the two major shareholders, the shares owned by Keihan were transferred to Kintetsu in April 1962 and the company was merged into Kintetsu from October 1963.

Between 1945 and 1968, there were through services with the Keihan Main Line using crossovers at Tambabashi. The line voltage was increased to 1,500 V DC in 1969, and in 1988 through services with the Karasuma Line were introduced.

== Stations ==
- ●: All trains stop
- ▲: Only express trains operated from Kyoto to Kintetsu Miyazu stop
- ♦: Limited stop (northbound in the morning, southbound in the evening)
- |: Trains pass
- Local trains stop at every station between Kyoto and Yamato-Saidaiji.

| No. | Station | Distance in km (mi) | Semi-express | Express | Limited express | Transfers | Location | |
|---|---|---|---|---|---|---|---|---|
| B01 | Kyōto 京都 | 0 (0) | ● | ● | ● | Tokaido Shinkansen; A Biwako Line (Tōkaidō Main Line) (JR-A31); A JR Kyōto Line; D Nara Line (JR-D01); E Sagano Line (San'in Main Line) (JR-E01); Karasuma Line (K11) | Shimogyō-ku, Kyoto | Kyoto Prefecture |
| B02 | Tōji 東寺 | 0.9 (0.56) | ● | ● | | | | Minami-ku, Kyoto | Kyoto Prefecture |
| B03 | Jūjō 十条 | 1.5 (0.93) | | | | | | | | Minami-ku, Kyoto | Kyoto Prefecture |
| B04 | Kamitobaguchi 上鳥羽口 | 2.5 (1.6) | | | | | | | | Fushimi-ku, Kyoto | Kyoto Prefecture |
| B05 | Takeda 竹田 | 3.6 (2.2) | ● | ● | | | Karasuma Line (K15) | Fushimi-ku, Kyoto | Kyoto Prefecture |
| B06 | Fushimi 伏見 | 4.9 (3.0) | | | | | | | | Fushimi-ku, Kyoto | Kyoto Prefecture |
| B07 | Kintetsu-Tambabashi 近鉄丹波橋 | 6.0 (3.7) | ● | ● | ● | Keihan Main Line (Tambabashi) (KH30) | Fushimi-ku, Kyoto | Kyoto Prefecture |
| B08 | Momoyamagoryōmae 桃山御陵前 | 6.5 (4.0) | ● | ● | | | | Fushimi-ku, Kyoto | Kyoto Prefecture |
| B09 | Mukaijima 向島 | 8.6 (5.3) | ● | | | | | | Fushimi-ku, Kyoto | Kyoto Prefecture |
| B10 | Ogura 小倉 | 11.4 (7.1) | ● | | | | | | Uji | Kyoto Prefecture |
| B11 | Iseda 伊勢田 | 12.7 (7.9) | ● | | | | | | Uji | Kyoto Prefecture |
| B12 | Ōkubo 大久保 | 13.6 (8.5) | ● | ● | | | | Uji | Kyoto Prefecture |
| B13 | Kutsukawa 久津川 | 14.6 (9.1) | ● | | | | | | Jōyō | Kyoto Prefecture |
| B14 | Terada 寺田 | 15.9 (9.9) | ● | | | | | | Jōyō | Kyoto Prefecture |
| B15 | Tonoshō 富野荘 | 17.4 (10.8) | ● | | | | | | Jōyō | Kyoto Prefecture |
| B16 | Shin-Tanabe 新田辺 | 19.6 (12.2) | ● | ● | | | | Kyōtanabe | Kyoto Prefecture |
| B17 | Kōdo 興戸 | 21.1 (13.1) | | ▲ | | | | Kyōtanabe | Kyoto Prefecture |
| B18 | Miyamaki 三山木 | 22.4 (13.9) | | ▲ | | | | Kyōtanabe | Kyoto Prefecture |
| B19 | Kintetsu Miyazu 近鉄宮津 | 23.1 (14.4) | | ▲ | | | | Kyōtanabe | Kyoto Prefecture |
| B20 | Komada 狛田 | 24.4 (15.2) | | | | | | | Seika | Kyoto Prefecture |
| B21 | Shin-Hōsono 新祝園 | 26.7 (16.6) | | ● | | | H Gakkentoshi Line (Hōsono) (JR-H20) | Seika | Kyoto Prefecture |
| B22 | Kizugawadai 木津川台 | 28.2 (17.5) | | | | | | | Seika | Kyoto Prefecture |
| B23 | Yamadagawa 山田川 | 29.2 (18.1) | | | | | | | Seika | Kyoto Prefecture |
| B24 | Takanohara 高の原 | 30.8 (19.1) | | ● | ♦ | | Nara | Nara Prefecture |
| B25 | Heijō 平城 | 33.5 (20.8) | | | | | | | Nara | Nara Prefecture |
| B26 | Yamato-Saidaiji 大和西大寺 | 34.6 (21.5) | | ● | ● | B Kashihara Line (through service) (B26); A Nara Line (A26) | Nara | Nara Prefecture |

Trains down to

- Local: Nara, Kashiharajingū-mae
- Express: Nara, Tenri, Kashiharajingū-mae
- Limited Express: Nara, Kashiharajingū-mae, Kashikojima
