= Tambabashi Station =

Railway station in Kyoto, Japan

Tambabashi Station 丹波橋駅
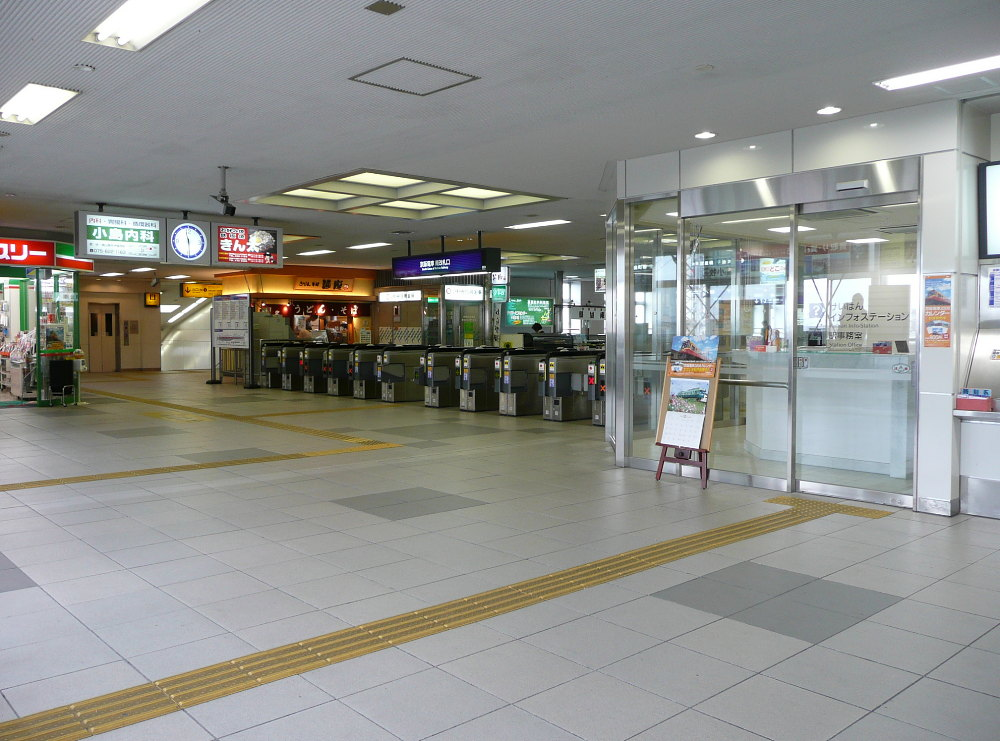
- South gate of the station

General information
- Location: Momoyama-Tsutsui Iga-nishimachi, Fushimi, Kyoto, Kyoto （京都市伏見区桃山筒井伊賀西町） Japan
- Coordinates: 34°56′19.2″N 135°45′55.5″E
- Operator: Keihan Electric Railway
- Line: Keihan Main Line

History
- Opened: April 15, 1910; 116 years ago
- Former names: Momoyama (until 1913)

Passengers
- FY2015: 19.5 million
Location

Tambabashi Station (丹波橋駅, Tanbabashi-eki) is a railway station located in Fushimi-ku, Kyoto, Kyoto Prefecture, Japan. It is connected by footbridge to nearby Kintetsu Tambabashi Station.

== Lines ==
- Keihan Electric Railway
  - Keihan Main Line

== History ==
The station opened on April 15, 1910, when Keihan Electric Railway opened its first section between Gojō in Kyoto and Temmabashi in Osaka. The name of the station was originally Momoyama Station (桃山駅, Momoyama-eki). On July 29, 1913, the station was renamed in order to clarify that the station is not convenient for the newly raised Fushimi Momoyama Tomb of Emperor Meiji, the nearest station of which is Fushimi-Momoyama Station (as renamed from Fushimi in 1915).

Tambabashi Station was promoted to a limited express stop on July 1, 2000. Since then all types of trains on the Keihan Main Line make stop at the station.

Between 1945 and 1968 the station served trains of the Kyoto Line (Nara Electric Railway until 1963). For details, see the article "Kintetsu-Tambabashi Station".

== Layout ==
There are two island platforms with four tracks on the ground.

1, 2	■ Keihan Line	for Sanjo and Demachiyanagi
3, 4	■ Keihan Line	for Chushojima, Hirakatashi, Yodoyabashi and Nakanoshima

== Adjacent stations ==
«	Service	»
Keihan Main Line
Fushimi-Momoyama	Local	Sumizome
Fushimi-Momoyama	Sub Express	Sumizome
Fushimi-Momoyama	Commuter Sub Express (on weekdays, only running for Yodoyabashi or Nakanoshima)	Sumizome
Chūshojima	Express	Fushimi-Inari
Chūshojima	Rapid Express	Shichijō
Chūshojima	Commuter Rapid Express (on weekdays, only running for Nakanoshima)	Shichijō
Chūshojima	Limited Express	Shichijō
Chūshojima	Rapid Limited Express (on Saturdays, Sundays and holidays during the tourist seasons and new year period)	Shichijō
