= Fushimi Station (Kyoto) =

Railway station in Japan

Fushimi Station 伏見駅
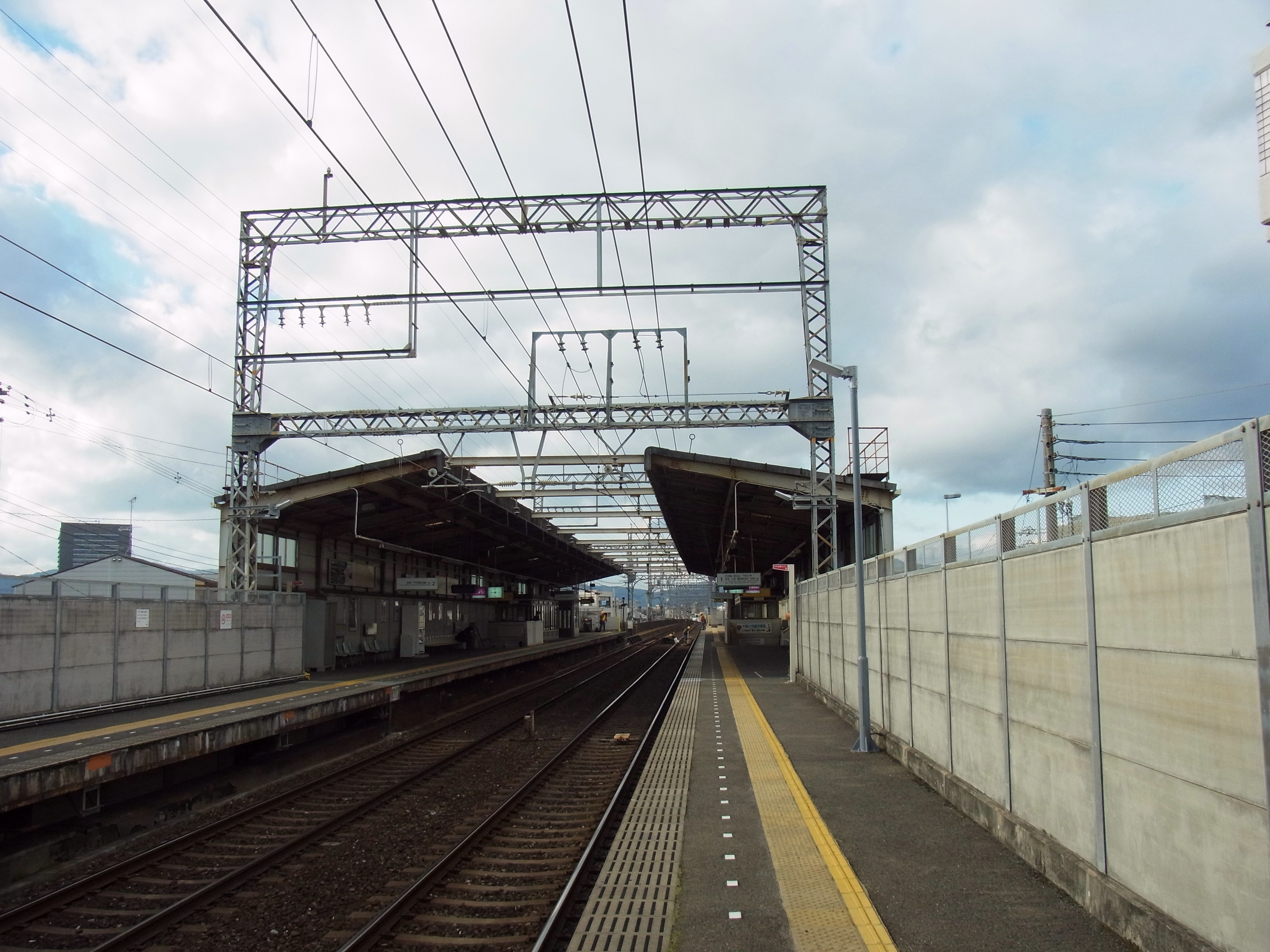
- Fushimi station 2013.1.10

General information
- Location: Fukakusa Shibata Yashikicho, Fushimi-ku, Kyoto-fu, 612-8432; Japan
- Coordinates: 34°56′46.36″N 135°45′40.56″E
- System: Kintetsu Railway commuter rail station
- Owner: Kintetsu Railway
- Operator: Kintetsu Railway
- Line: Kyoto/Kashihara Line
- Distance: 4.9 km from Kyoto
- Platforms: 2 side platforms

Construction
- Structure type: elevated

Other information
- Station code: B06
- Website: Official

History
- Opened: 5 May 1895
- Closed: 1921-1928

Passengers
- FY2015: 2.7 million

Services
Preceding station	Kintetsu Railway	Following station
Takeda towards Kyōto	Kyoto Line Local	Kintetsu Tambabashi towards Yamato-Saidaiji
Location

Fushimi Station (伏見駅, Fushimi-eki) is a passenger railway station located in Fushimi-ku in Kyoto, Japan. It is operated by the private railway operator Kintetsu Railway.It is station number B06.

== Lines ==
Fushimi Station is served by the Kyoto Line, and is located 4.9 kilometers from the terminus of the line at Kyoto Station.

== Station layout ==
The station consists two opposed elevated side platforms, with an effective platform length of six cars. The ticket gates and concourse are on the first floor, and there is only one ticket gate. The station is unattended.

=== Platforms ===
1	■ Kintetsu Kyoto Line	for Kashiharajingu-mae
2	■ Kintetsu Kyoto Line	for Kyoto

== History ==
The station opened on 5 September 1895 as a station of the government-run Nara Line. On 7 February 1905 the Nara Railway merged with the Kansai Railway, which was nationalized in 1907. Due to a change in routing, the section of track between Kyoto and Fushimi was closed on 1 August 1921, and Fushimi Station survived as a freight-only depot, until its closure on 3 September 1928. The station reopened on 15 November 1928 as a station on the Nara Electric Railroad. The Nara Electric Railroad merged with Kintetsu in 1963.

== Passenger statistics ==
In fiscal 2023, the station was used by an average of 7,323 passengers daily (boarding passengers only).

== Surrounding area ==
- Japan National Route 24
- Kyoto Municipal Fushimi-Sumiyoshi Elementary School
- Kyoto University of Education High School

== See also ==
- List of railway stations in Japan
