= Jūjō Station (Kintetsu) =

Railway station in Kyoto, Japan

Jūjō Station 十条駅
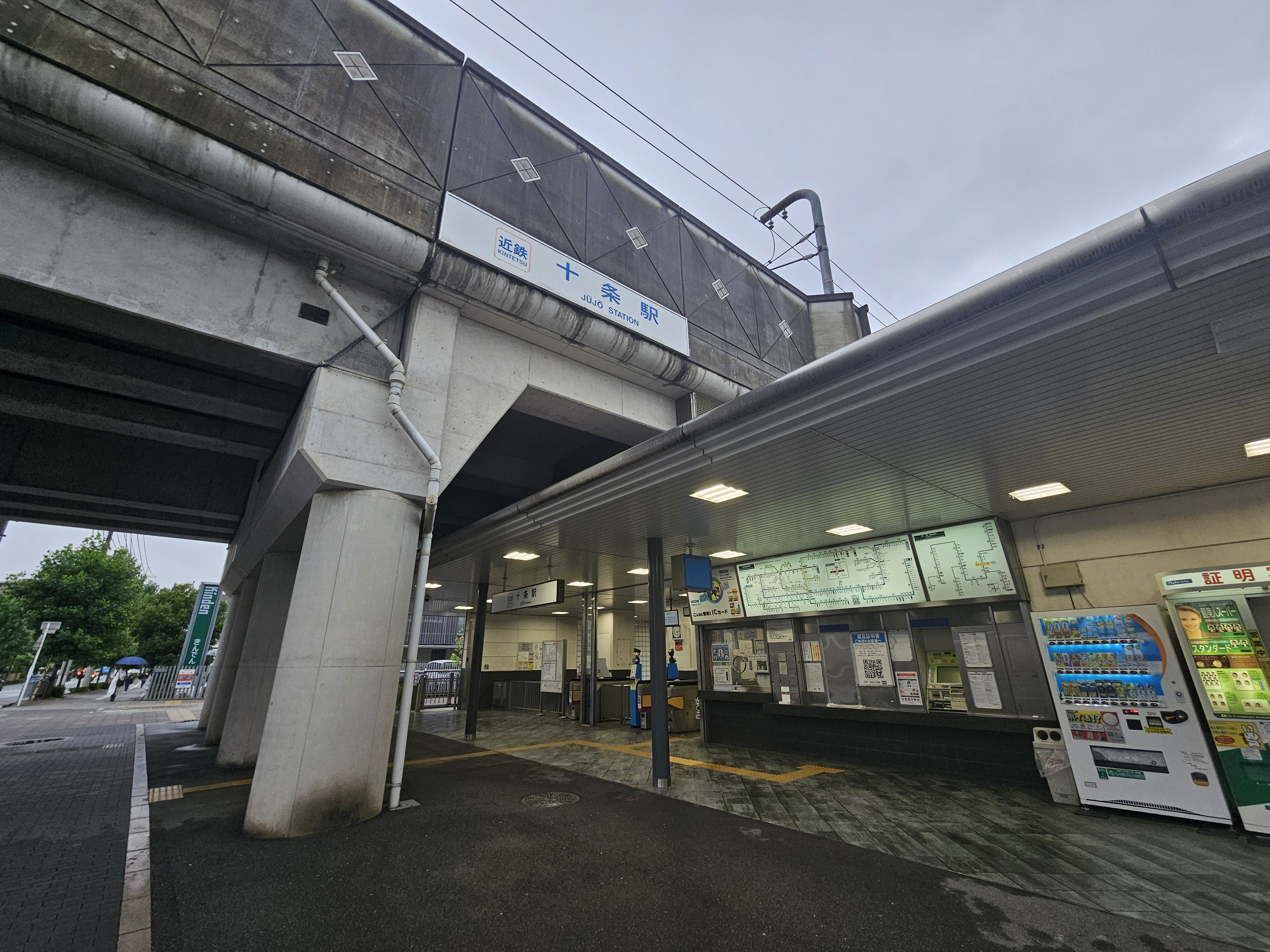
- Jūjō Station entrance in June 2025

General information
- Location: 1, Nishikujo Higashiyanaginouchicho, Minami-ku, Kyoto-shi, Kyoto-fu （京都府京都市南区西九条柳ノ内町1） Japan
- Coordinates: 34°58′26.39″N 135°45′8.81″E
- System: Kintetsu Railway commuter rail station
- Owner: Kintetsu Railway
- Operator: Kintetsu Railway
- Line: Kyoto/Kashihara Line
- Distance: 1.5 km from Kyoto
- Platforms: 1 island platform
- Tracks: 2
- Connections: Bus stop

Construction
- Structure type: Elevated

Other information
- Station code: B03
- Website: Official

History
- Opened: 3 November 1928

Passengers
- FY2015: 2.1 million

Services
Preceding station	Kintetsu Railway	Following station
Tōji towards Kyōto	Kyoto Line Local	Kamitobaguchi towards Yamato-Saidaiji
Location
- Location within Kyoto Prefecture Location within Japan

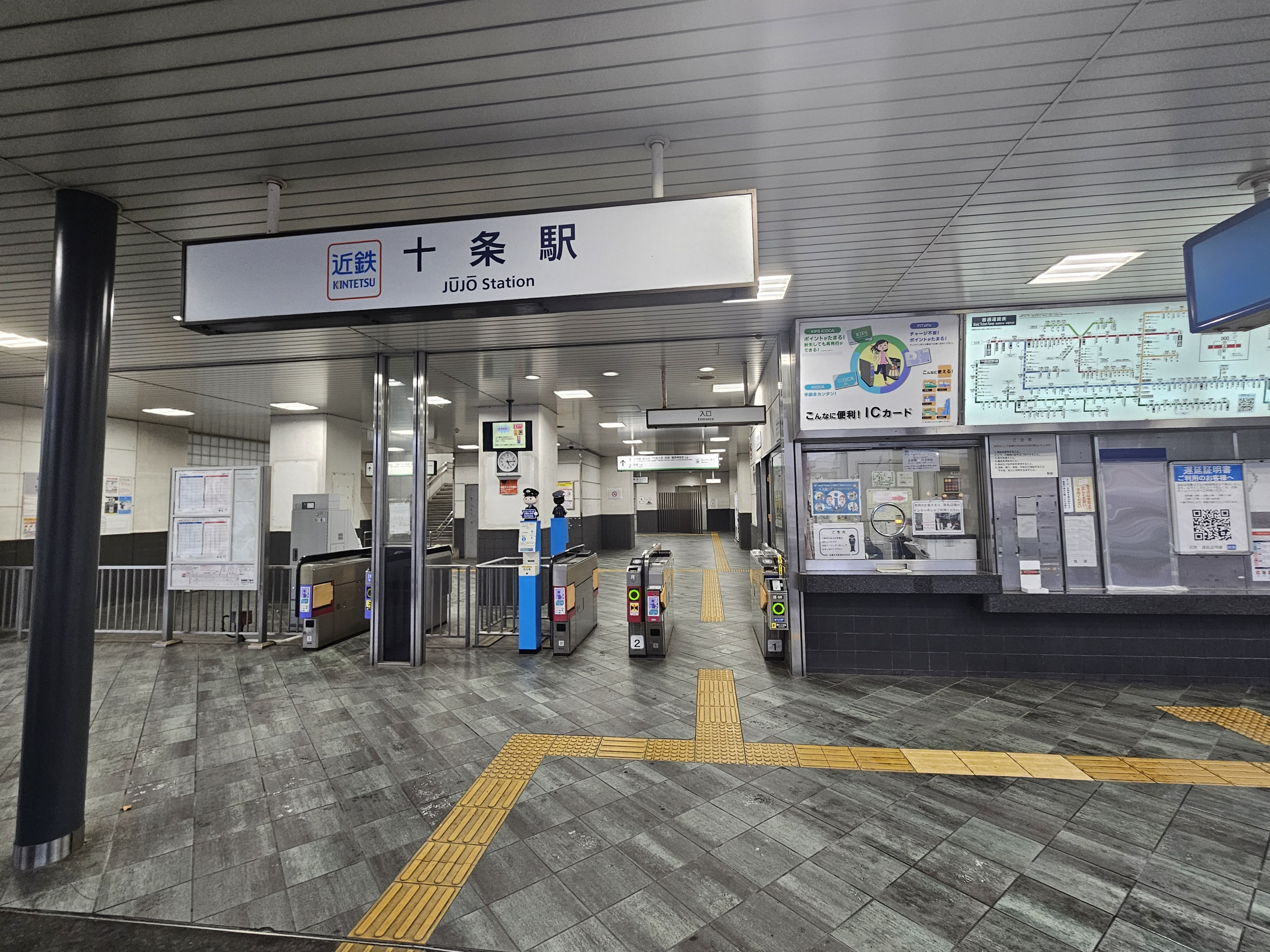
Ticket gate

Jūjō Station (十条駅, Jūjō-eki) is a passenger railway station located in Minami-ku in Kyoto, Japan. It is operated by the private railway operator Kintetsu Railway. It is station number B03.

== Lines ==
Jūjō Station is served by the Kyoto Line, and is located 1.5 kilometers from the terminus of the line at Kyoto Station.

== Station layout ==
The station consists of one elevated island platform with an effective platform length of six cars. The ticket gates and concourse are on the first floor, and there is only one ticket gate. The station is staffed.

=== Platforms ===
1	■ Kintetsu Kyoto Line	for Kashiharajingū-mae
2	■ Kintetsu Kyoto Line	for Kyoto

== History ==
The station opened on 15 November 1928 as a station of Nara Electric Railroad. Nara Electric Railroad merged with Kintetsu in 1963. The station was elevated in 1999. In 2007, the station started using PiTaPa.

== Passenger statistics ==
In fiscal 2023, the station was used by an average of 6,060 passengers daily (boarding passengers only).

== Surrounding area ==
- Minami Ward Office, Kyoto City
- Nintendo Global Headquarters
- SG Holdings Co., Ltd., Sagawa Express Co., Ltd.

== See also ==
- List of railway stations in Japan
