= Momoyama Station =

Railway station in Kyoto, Japan

Momoyama Station 桃山駅
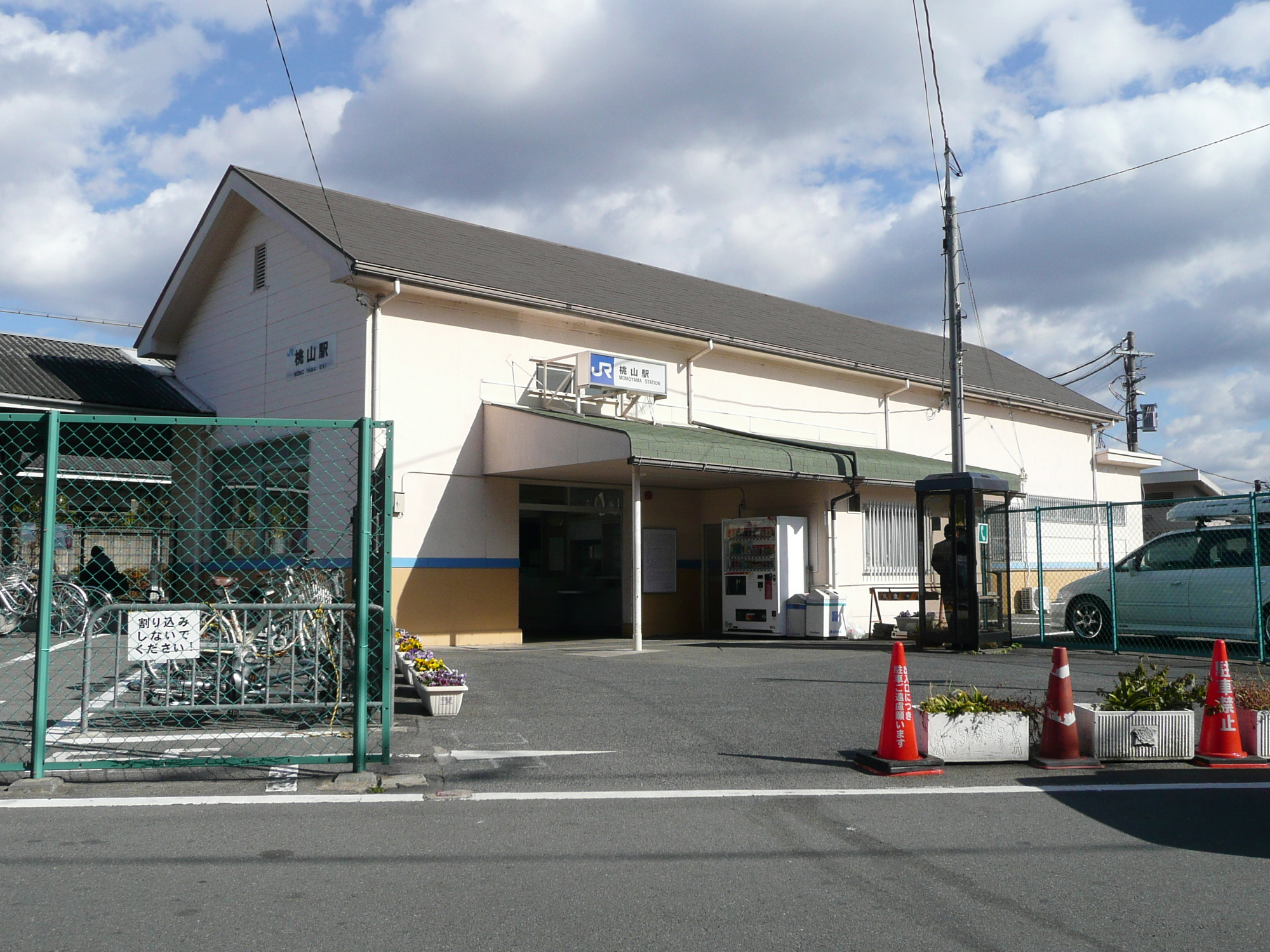
- Momoyama Station in December 2007

General information
- Location: 34, Momoyama-chō Nabeshima, Fushimi, Kyoto （京都市伏見区桃山町鍋島34） Kyoto Prefecture; Japan
- Coordinates: 34°55′57.42″N 135°46′16″E
- Operator: JR West
- Line: D Nara Line
- Platforms: 1 island platform + 1 side platform
- Tracks: 3

Construction
- Structure type: Ground level
- Accessible: Yes

Other information
- Station code: JR-D05
- Website: Official website

History
- Opened: 1895

Passengers
- FY 2023: 4,372 daily
Location
- Location within Kyoto Prefecture Location within Japan

Momoyama Station (桃山駅, Momoyama-eki) is a railway station located in Fushimi-ku, Kyoto, Kyoto Prefecture, Japan, operated by West Japan Railway Company (JR West). It has the station number "JR-D05".

== Lines ==
Momoyama Station is served by the Nara Line.

== Layout ==
The station has one island platform and one side platform serving three tracks in total.

=== Platforms ===
1	■ Nara Line	for Kyōto
2	■ Nara Line	Not in use

3	■ Nara Line	for Uji and Nara

== History ==
Station numbering was introduced in March 2018 with Momoyama being assigned station number JR-D05.

== Passenger statistics ==
According to the Kyoto Prefecture statistical report, the average number of passengers per day is as follows.

Year	Passengers
1999	1,375
2000	1,460
2001	1,586
2002	1,622
2003	1,677
2004	1,734
2005	1,759
2006	1,732
2007	1,730
2008	1,699
2009	1,781
2010	1,784
2011	1,891
2012	1,985
2013	2,063
2014	2,038
2015	2,087
2016	2,079

== Adjacent stations ==
«	Service	»
Nara Line
Miyakoji Rapid Service: Does not stop at this station
Rapid Service: Does not stop at this station
Regional Rapid Service: Does not stop at this station
JR Fujinomori	Local	Rokujizō
