= Fushimi-Momoyama Station =

Railway station in Kyoto, Japan

Fushimi-Momoyama Station 伏見桃山駅
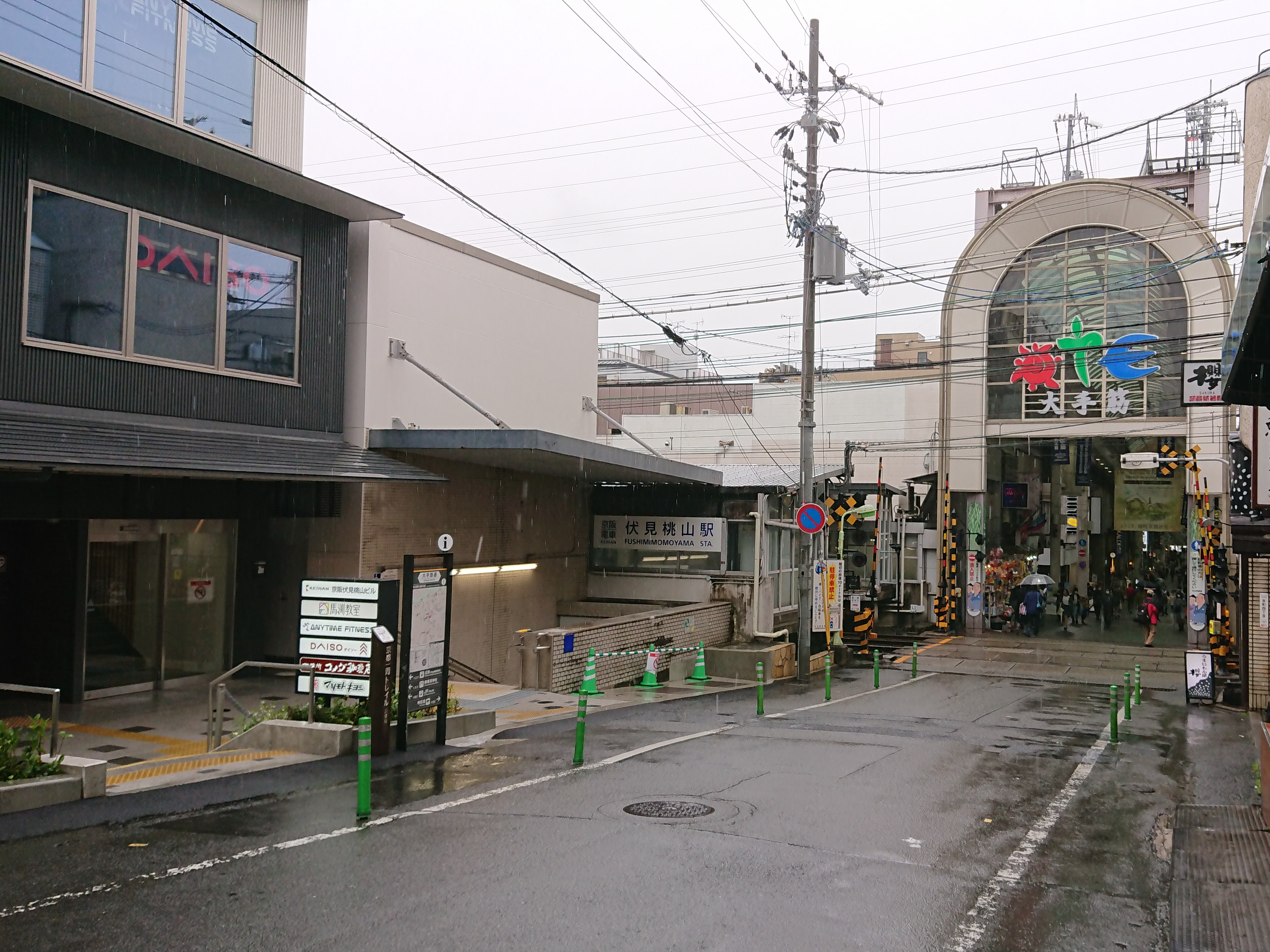
- Fushimi-Momoyama Station, April 2021

General information
- Location: Fushimi, Kyoto, Kyoto; Japan
- Coordinates: 34.9329°N 135.7644°E
- Operator: Keihan Electric Railway
- Line: Keihan Main Line

Passengers
- FY2015: 4.3 million
Location

Fushimi-Momoyama Station (伏見桃山駅, Fushimi-Momoyama-eki) is a train station located in Fushimi-ku ward, city of Kyoto, Kyoto Prefecture, Japan.

== Lines ==
- Keihan Electric Railway
  - Keihan Main Line

== Adjacent stations ==
«	Service	»
Keihan Railway Keihan Main Line
Rapid Limited Express for Demachiyanagi (in the evening on weekdays): Does not stop at this station
Limited Express: Does not stop at this station
Commuter Rapid Express for Nakanoshima (in the morning on weekdays): Does not stop at this station
Rapid Express: Does not stop at this station
Express: Does not stop at this station
Chūshojima	Commuter Sub Express for Yodoyabashi or Nakanoshima (in the morning on weekdays)	Tambabashi
Chūshojima	Sub Express	Tambabashi
Chūshojima	Local	Tambabashi
