= Hirakawa temple ruins =

Temple in Jōyō, Kyōto

- 平川廃寺跡 (Japanese)
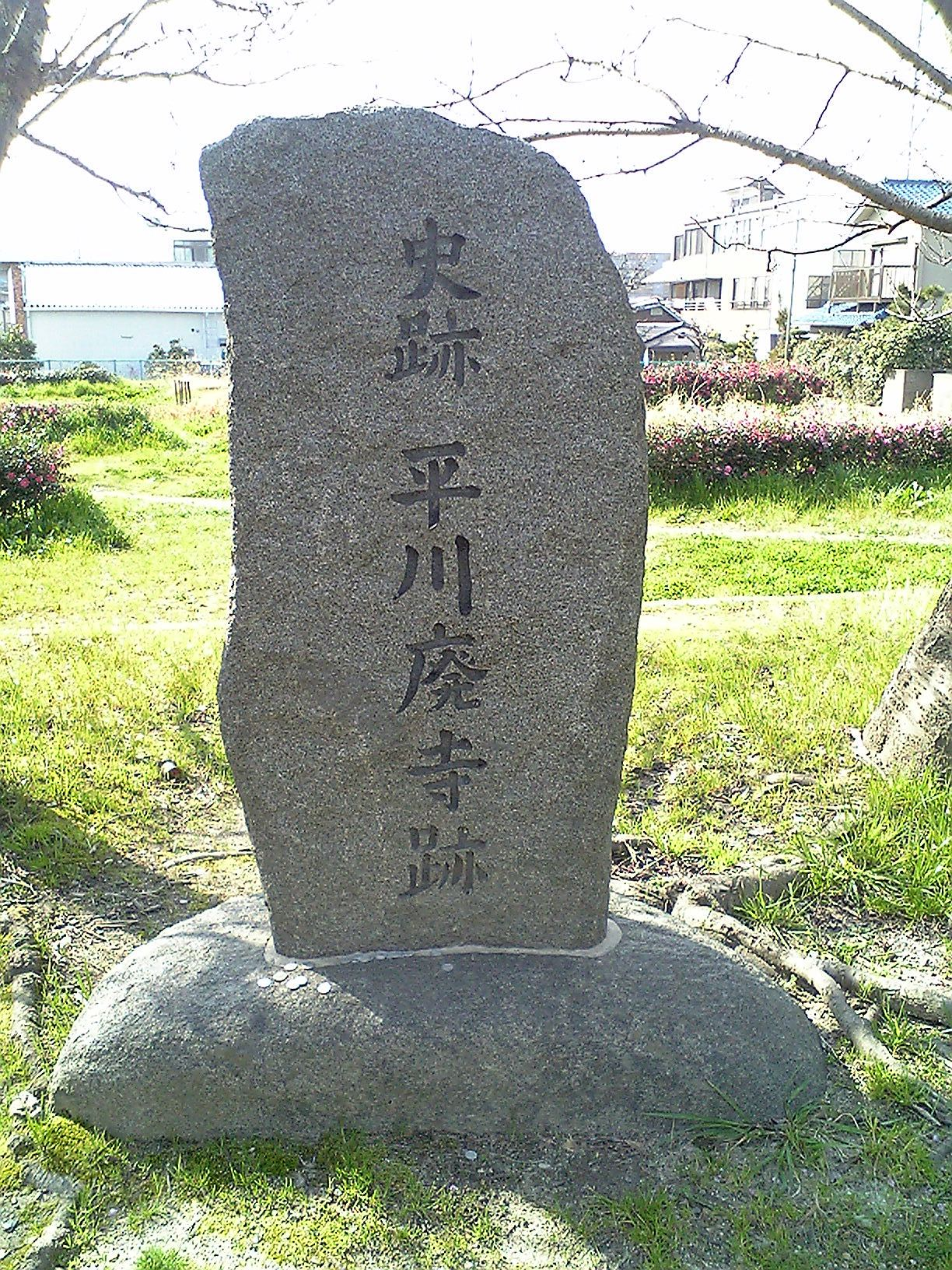
- Hirakawa temple ruins

- Hirakawa temple ruins Hirakawa temple ruins (Japan)
- Interactive map of Hirakawa temple ruins
- 34°51′45.28″N 135°46′40.29″E
- Type: temple ruins
- Periods: Nara period
- Location: Jōyō, Kyoto, Japan
- Region: Kinai region

History
- Built: 8th century AD

Site notes
- Public access: Yes (no facilities)

Hirakawa temple ruins (平川廃寺跡, Hirakawa haiji ato) is an archaeological site with the ruins of a Nara period Buddhist temple located in the Hirakawa-Furumiya neighborhood of the city of Jōyō, Kyoto, Japan. It was designated as a National Historic Site in 1975 with the area under protection expanded in 2008.

== Overview ==
The Hirakawa temple ruins are located on the east bank of the Kizu River, on a low plateau on the edge of Uji Hills in southern Yamashiro along the old Yamato Kaidō highway. It is also located near the Kutsukawa Kofun Cluster and is adjacent to the Akatsuka Kofun. The temple was constructed in the middle of the Nara period, and was on a large scale, comparable to the Yamashiro Kokubun-ji; however, it does not appear in any historical records, and the name and history of the temple are completely unknown.

The layout of buildings was patterned after Hōryū-ji in Ikaruga, Nara, with a Main Hall on the east and Pagoda on the west. The foundations of the Lecture Hall and Middle Gate have not been confirmed, however, the cloister surrounding the pagoda and Main Hall is estimated to be approximately 81 meters from east-to-west and approximately 72 meters from north-to-south, and the temple area is estimated to be approximately 175 meters from east-to-west and approximately 115 meters from north-to-south. The base of the pagoda was a tiled platform made of river stones with a diameter of about 20 cm and flat tiles stacked horizontally, and each side was 17.2 meters. The foundation of the main hall were of the same style of construction as the pagoda, and measured 22.5 by 17.2 meters, with a 2.2 meter extension which was added to the south side between the end of the Nara period and the beginning of the Heian period. The excavated roof tiles date the construction to the middle of the Nara period and other traces indicate that the temple was destroyed by fire shortly after repairs were made at the beginning of the Heian period and was never rebuilt.

This has been theorized that the temple was the clan temple of the Kifumi (黄文氏 ) clan, a toraijin immigrant clan claiming descent from King Yeongyang of Goguryeo. Mentioned in the Nihon Shoki and other sources, the clan was based in southern Yamashiro from the end of the Kofun period and at times held the position of provincial governor, but disappeared from history due to their connection with the Tachibana no Naramaro incident, roughly at the same time this temple was destroyed. Physical evidence for this is the fact that many of the roof tiles found at the site are identical to tiles found at the Kuni-kyō palace site, which was the power base for Tachibana no Moroe,

Currently, only the ruins of the pagoda and the main hall in the center of the temple remain as a historical park, and private houses are built in the rest of the temple grounds. The foundation stones and platform have not been restored, and the remains of the building can only be seen on the platform. The temple site is approximately 15 minutes walk from Kutsukawa Station on the Kintetsu Kyoto Line.

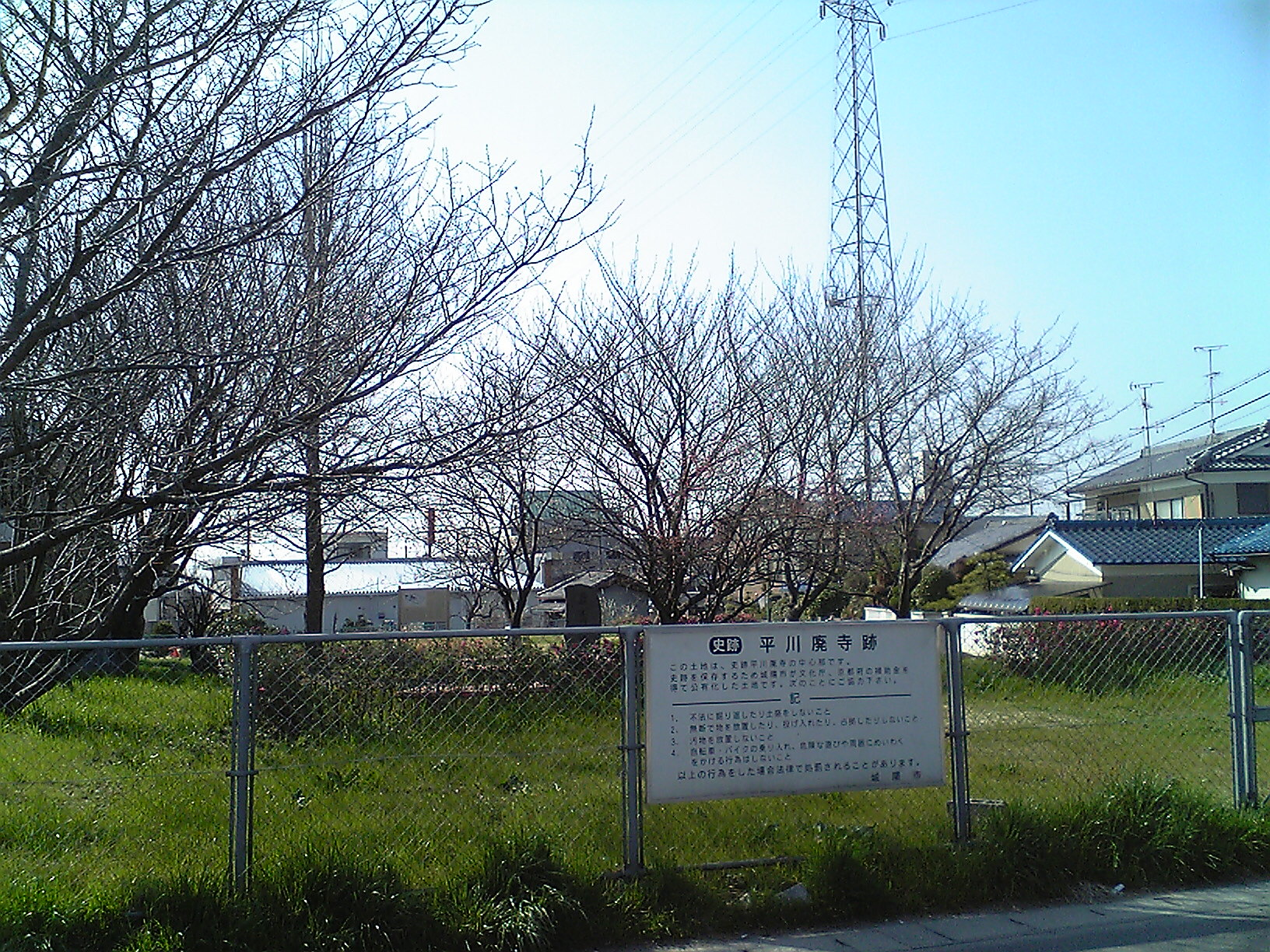
Hirakawa Abandoned Temple Ruins (panoramic view from the old Yamato Kaido side)

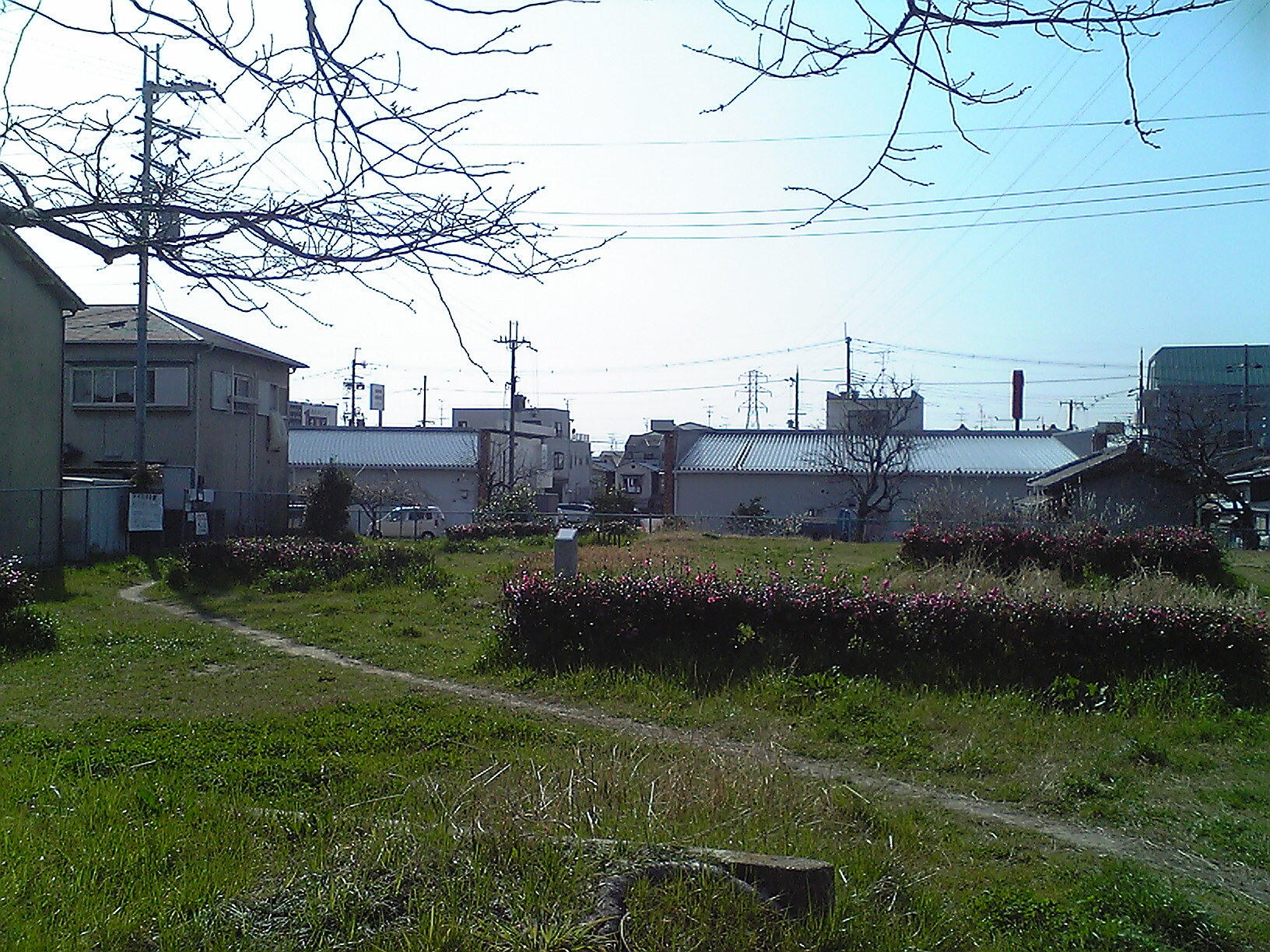
A platform near the remains of the tower on the west side of the temple

=== Akatsuka Kofun ===
The Akatsuka Kofun is located outside the earthen palisade on the west side of the Hirakawa temple ruins. The earthen palisade curved around the tumulus, so as not to destroy it, but the connection of the tumulus (if any) with the temple is otherwise unknown. Although most of the tumulus has been destroyed, it was originally an enpun (円墳)-style round tomb with a diameter of approximately 22.5 meters with an opening on the south side. It is thought to have been constructed in the latter half of the 5th century based on the clay used.

== See also ==
- List of Historic Sites of Japan (Kyoto)
