= Kumiyama =

Kumiyama 久御山町
- Town
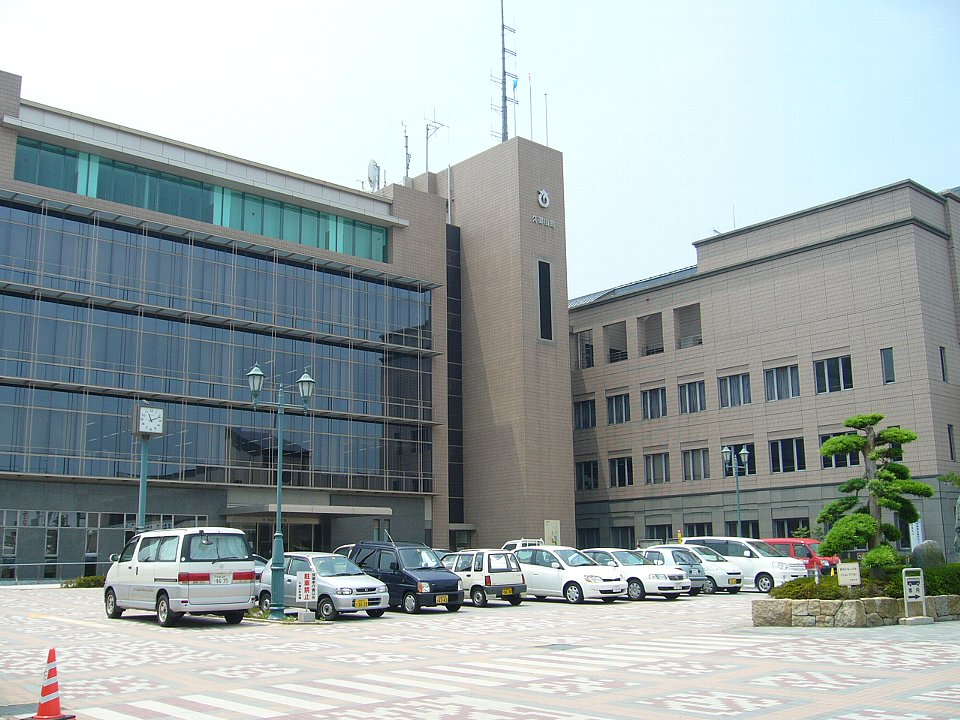
- Kumiyama Town Hall

- Flag Chapter
- Interactive map of Kumiyama
- Location in near Kyoto Kyoto Prefecture Japan
- Coordinates: 34°52′53″N 135°43′58″E
- Country: Japan
- Region: Kansai
- Prefecture: Kyoto
- District: Kuse District

Area
  - Total: 13.86 km^{2} (5.35 sq mi)

Population (August 1, 2023)
  - Total: 15,444
  - Density: 1,114/km^{2} (2,886/sq mi)
- Time zone: UTC+09:00 (JST)
- City hall address: Shimada misu no 38-banchi, Kumiyama-cho, Kuse-gun, Kyoto-fu 613-8585
- Website: Official website
- Symbols
- Bird: Grey-headed lapwing
- Flower: Rhododendron indicum
- Tree: Camellia sasanqua

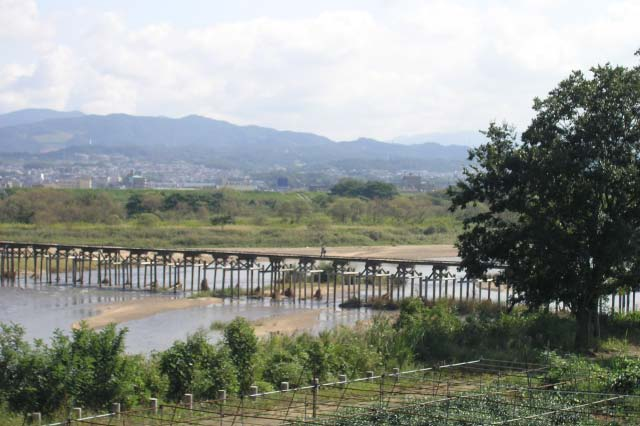
Nagarebashi

Kumiyama (久御山町, Kumiyama-chō) is a town located in Kuse District, Kyoto Prefecture, Japan. As of 1 August 2023, the town has an estimated population of 15,444 in 7353 households and a population density of 1100 persons per km^{2}. The total area of the town is 13.86 square kilometres (5.35 sq mi).

== Geography ==
Kumiyama is located in southeastern Kyoto Prefecture. It is located on an alluvial plain created by the sedimentation of the Kizugawa River, and is located at a low average elevation.

=== Neighboring municipalities ===
Kyoto Prefecture

- Jōyō
- Kyoto
- Tsuzuki District (Ujitawara)
- Yawata

=== Climate ===
Kumiyama has a humid subtropical climate (Köppen Cfa) characterized by warm summers and cool winters with light to no snowfall. The average annual temperature in Kumiyama is 14.5 °C. The average annual rainfall is 1677 mm with September as the wettest month. The temperatures are highest on average in August, at around 26.5 °C, and lowest in January, at around 3.1 °C.

== Demographics ==
Per Japanese census data, the population of Kumiyama has declined in recent decades.

Historical population
Year	Pop.	±%
1940	5,407	—
1950	6,428	+18.9%
1960	6,400	−0.4%
1970	8,766	+37.0%
1980	16,345	+86.5%
1990	18,798	+15.0%
2000	17,080	−9.1%
2010	15,916	−6.8%
2020	15,250	−4.2%

== History ==
The area of Kumiyama was part of ancient Yamashiro Province. During the Edo Period, the area was part of the direct holdings of the Tokugawa shogunate. The villages of Sayama and Mimaki were established on April 1, 1889, with the creation of the modern municipalities system. The two villages merged on October 1, 1954, to form the town of Kumiyama.

== Government ==
Kumiyama has a mayor-council form of government with a directly elected mayor and a unicameral village council of 14 members. Kumiyama, collectively with the city of Uji, contributes five members to the Kyoto Prefectural Assembly. In terms of national politics, the village is part of the Kyoto 6th district of the lower house of the Diet of Japan.

== Economy ==
Kumiyama has a mixed economy. The northern half of the town area is a large rice-growing area called Ogura Pond Reclaimed Fields. To the west of Japan National Route 1, suburban agriculture is thriving. The daikon radish in particular is a regional brand called "Yodo daikon". Because Japan National Route 1 runs through the town, it is possible to quickly ship products to consumption areas. The Kumiyama Industrial Park is located in the area adjacent to the south of Ogura Pond Reclaimed Fields, and there are many establishments mainly involved in metal processing, plastic processing, and food manufacturing. This was the site of the former Kyoto Airfield, which was constructed during World War II, which was converted into an industrial park after the war.

== Education ==
Kumiyama has three public elementary schools and one public junior high school operated by town government, and one public high school operated by the Kyoto Prefectural Board of Education.

== Transportation ==
=== Railways ===
Although the Keihan Electric Railway Keihan Main Line passes through the western edge of the town, Kumiyama has no passenger rail service. However, in areas north of the Uji River, Yodo Station is within walking distance. In the southeast, Ōkubo Station and Iseda Station on the Kintetsu Railway's Kyoto Line in the city of Uji

=== Highways ===
- Daini Keihan Expressway
- National Route 1
- National Route 24
- National Route 478

== Notable people from Kumiyama ==
- Sumika Nono, Takarazuka actress
