= Jōyō, Kyoto =

Jōyō 城陽市
- City
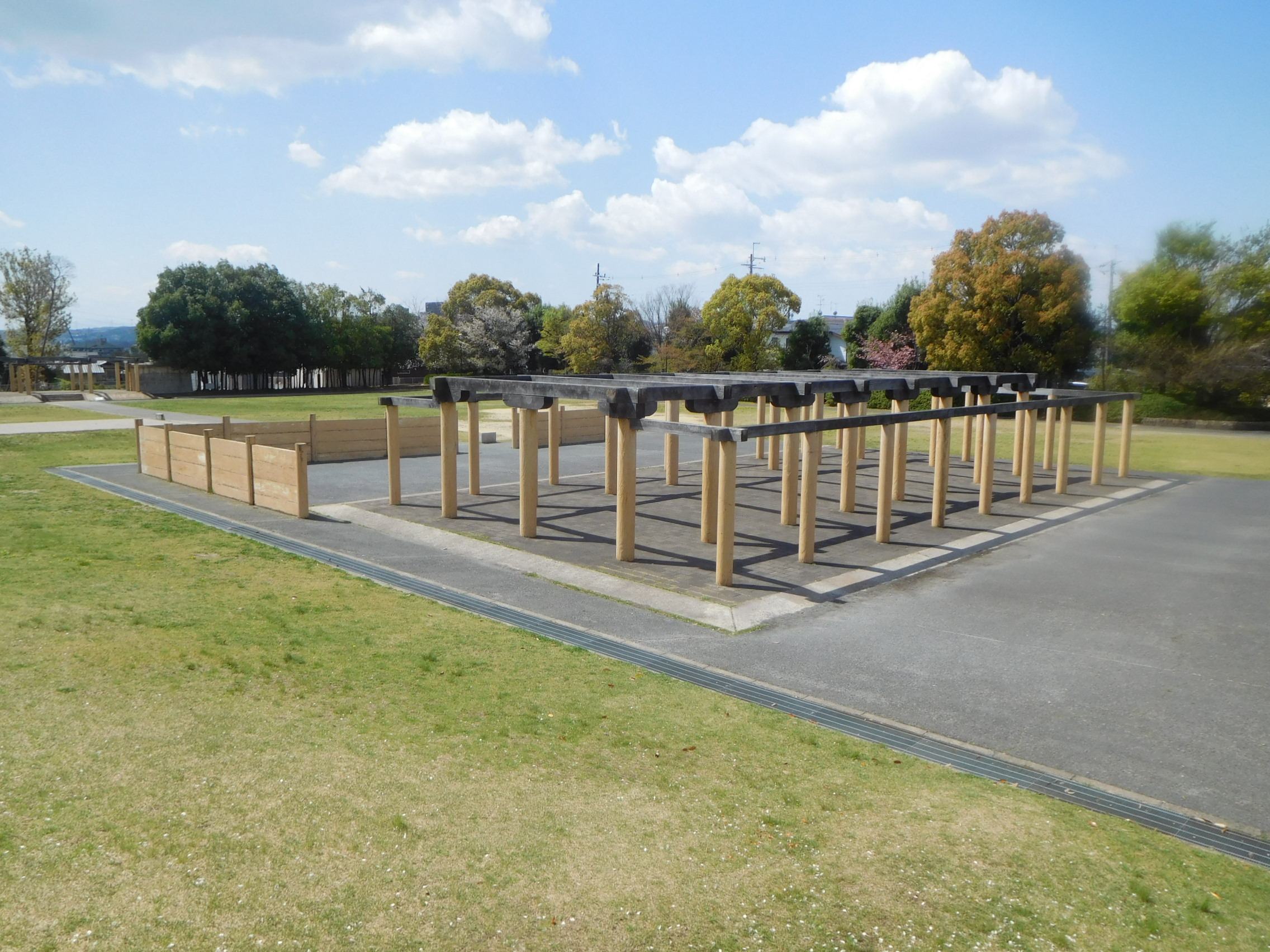
- Shōdō Kanga ruins

- Flag Emblem
- Interactive map of Jōyō
- Location in Japan
- Coordinates: 34°51′11″N 135°46′48″E
- Country: Japan
- Region: Kansai
- Prefecture: Kyoto
- As Terada, Mizunushi, Tominoshō and Aotani village settled: April 1, 1889
- As four villages merger and town settled: April 1, 1951
- City settled: May 3, 1972

Government
  - Mayor: Masaaki Murata (ja:村田正明) - from September 2025

Area
  - Total: 32.71 km^{2} (12.63 sq mi)

Population (September 1, 2023)
  - Total: 72,869
  - Density: 2,228/km^{2} (5,770/sq mi)
- Time zone: UTC+09:00 (JST)
- City hall address: 16-17 Higashinokuchi, Terada, Jōyō-shi, Kyōto-fu 610-0195
- Website: Official website
- Symbols
- Flower: Iris
- Tree: Ume

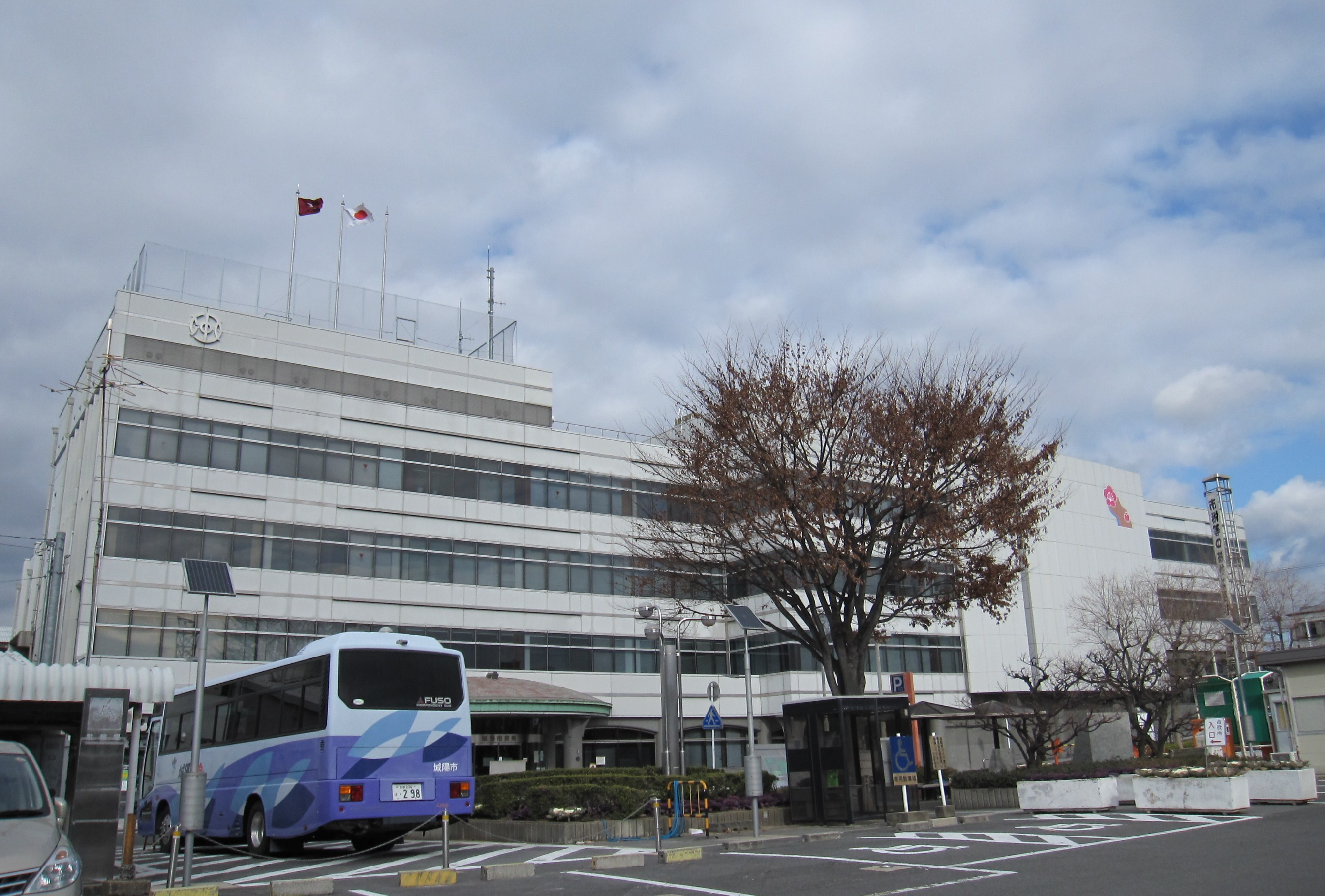
Joyo City Hall

Jōyō (Japanese: 城陽市, Jōyō-shi, pronounced [dʑoːjoː ɕi]) is a city located in Kyoto Prefecture, Kansai, Japan. As of 1 September 2023, the city has an estimated population of 72,869 in 30720 households and a population density of 2200 persons per km^{2}. The total area of the city is 32.71 square kilometres (12.63 sq mi).

== Geography ==
Jōyō is located in southeastern Kyoto Prefecture. It is halfway between Kyoto and Nara. It is located in the southeastern part of the Kyoto Basin, with the Kizugawa River to the west and hills to the east. The Aoya River flows from east to west in the southern part of the city. The terrain is generally flat in the west, and becomes more undulating towards the east.

=== Neighboring municipalities ===
Kyoto Prefecture

- Kuse District (Kumiyama)
- Kyōtanabe
- Tsuzuki District (Ide, Ujitawara)
- Uji
- Yawata

=== Climate ===
Jōyō has a humid subtropical climate (Köppen Cfa) characterized by warm summers and cool winters with light to no snowfall. The average annual temperature in Jōyō is 13.6 °C. The average annual rainfall is 1356 mm with September as the wettest month. The temperatures are highest on average in August, at around 26.3 °C, and lowest in January, at around 2.8 °C.

== Demographics ==
Per Japanese census data, the population of Jōyō has declined in recent decades.

Historical population
| Year | Pop. | ±% |
|---|---|---|
| 1940 | 10,963 | — |
| 1950 | 13,706 | +25.0% |
| 1960 | 14,690 | +7.2% |
| 1970 | 35,658 | +142.7% |
| 1980 | 74,350 | +108.5% |
| 1990 | 84,770 | +14.0% |
| 2000 | 84,346 | −0.5% |
| 2010 | 80,051 | −5.1% |
| 2020 | 74,607 | −6.8% |

== History ==
The area of Jōyō was part of ancient Yamashiro Province. The villages of Kutsukawa, Tominosho and Terada in Kuse District, Kyoto and the village of Aodani in Tsuzuki District, Kyoto were established on April 1, 1889 with the creation of the modern municipalities system. These villages merged on April 1, 1951 to form the town of Jōyō, which was elevated to city status on May 3, 1972.

== Government ==
Jōyō has a mayor-council form of government with a directly elected mayor and a unicameral city council of 20 members. Jōyō contributes two members to the Kyoto Prefectural Assembly. In terms of national politics, the city is part of the Kyoto 6th district of the lower house of the Diet of Japan.

== Economy ==
Jōyō has a mixed economy based on commerce, agriculture and light manufacturing.

=== Industry ===
- Gold and silver thread

Gold and silver threads weaved into Kimono and Obi are produced at Joyo. Joyo produces 60% of all the gold and silver thread in Japan.

=== Agriculture ===
- figs
- sweet potatoes

== Education ==
Jōyō has ten public elementary schools and five public junior high schools operated by city government and two public high schools operated by the Kyoto Prefectural Board of Education. The prefecture also operates one special education school for the handicapped.

== Transportation ==
=== Railways ===
JR West - Nara Line

- Jōyō - Nagaike - Yamashiro-Aodani

- Kintetsu Railway Kyoto Line

- Kutsukawa - Terada - Tonoshō

=== Highways ===
- Shin-Meishin Expressway
- Keinawa Expressway
- National Route 24
- National Route 307

== Sister cities ==
Jōyō has two sister cities:

- Gyeongsan, Gyeongsangbuk-do, South Korea
- Vancouver, Washington, United States

== Local attractions ==
- Aodani plum forest (青谷梅林) - Currently about 10,000 ume trees are planted in this 20-hectare area, considered the largest in Kyoto Prefecture. A detailed origin of this ume grove is not known. It is known that in the beginning of the Medieval era (Kamakura period, 1185-1333 AD) a prince wrote a tanka to praise this ume grove.
- Hirakawa temple ruins, National Historic Site
- Kutsukawa Kofun Cluster, National Historic Site
- Mito Jinja
- Shōdō Kanga ruins, National Historic Site

== Sports ==
=== Soccer ===
- Kyoto Sanga F.C. (Association football)
  - Sanga town Jōyō is an official training field for the Kyoto Sanga F.C., which belongs to the Japanese professional association football league, J. League.

== Notable people from Jōyō ==
- Shinobu Satouchi, voice actor
- Tetsuji Tamayama, actor
