= Terada Station =

Terada Station is the name of multiple train stations in Japan:

- Terada Station (Kyoto), in Jōyō, Kyoto
- Terada Station (Toyama), in Tateyama, Nakaniikawa District, Toyama Prefecture
