= Kutsukawa Kofun Cluster =

Group of Kofun period burial mounds in Jōyō, Kyoto, Japan

Kutsukawa Kofun cluster
- 久津川古墳群 (Japanese)
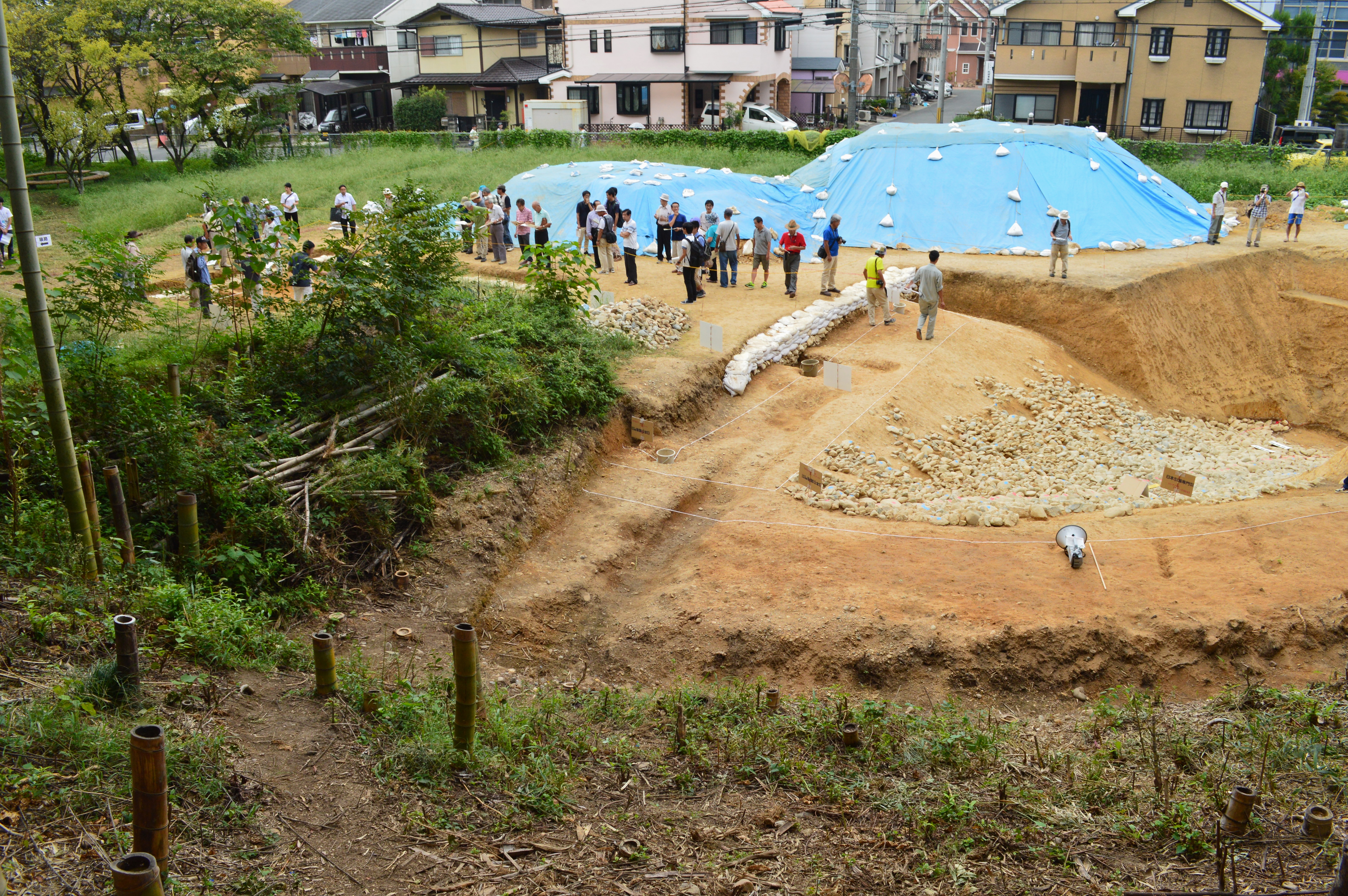
- Kutsukawa Kurumazuka Kofun

- Kutsukawa Kofun cluster Kutsukawa Kofun Cluster (Japan)
- Interactive map of Kutsukawa Kofun cluster
- 34°51′53.32″N 135°46′44.19″E
- Type: Kofun
- Periods: Kofun period
- Location: Jōyō, Kyoto, Japan
- Region: Kansai region

History
- Built: c.5th century

Site notes
- Public access: Yes (no facilities)

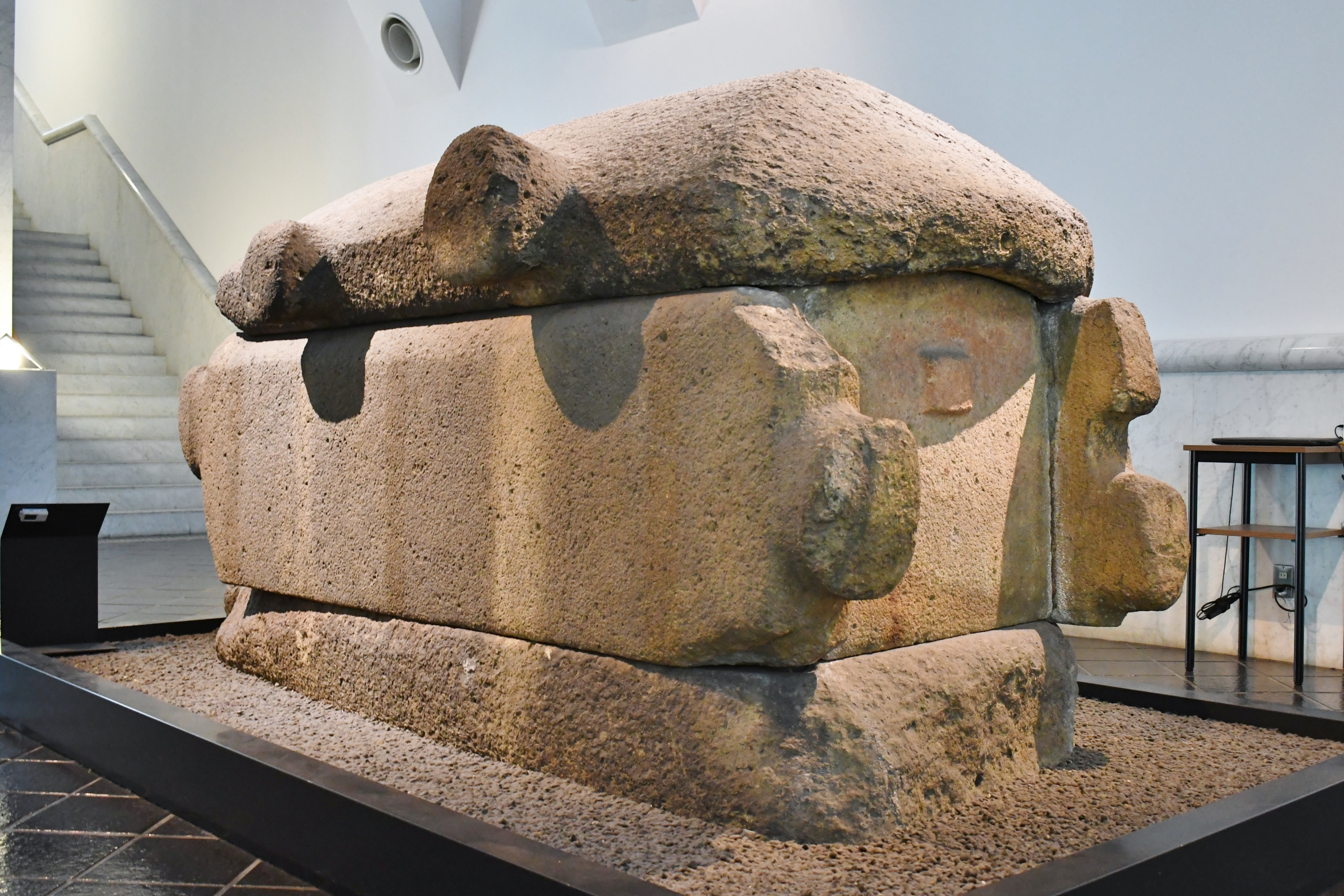
Stone Sarcophagus from the Kutsukawa Kurumazuka Kofun (ICP)

Kutsukawa Kofun cluster (久津川古墳群) is a group of more than 150 Kofun period burial mounds, located in the city of Jōyō, Kyoto in the Kansai region of Japan. In 1979, the Kutsukawa Kurumazuka Kofun and Maruzuka Kofun were collectively designated as a National Historic Site and the Bashōzuka Kofun and Kuze Elementary School Kofun were added to the National Historic site in 2016, which was renamed the "Kutsugawa Kofun cluster".

== Kutsukawa Kurumazuka Kofun ==
The Kutsukawa Kurumazuka Kofun (久津川車塚古墳) is a zenpō-kōen-fun (前方後円墳), which is shaped like a keyhole, having one square end and one circular end, when viewed from above. It is the largest burial mound in the southern Yamashiro region, and is estimated to have been built in the first half of the 5th century (first half of the middle Kofun period). It is located on the hills on the right bank of the Kizu River in the northern part of Jōyō city. The tumulus is orientated to the south and is built in three tiers. It is approximately 180 meters long, (272 meters when including the moat), making it the largest in the Kutsugawa Tomb Group. On the outside of the mound, fukiishi roofing stones and rows of haniwa clay figures have been found. A double moat exists on west side, but no trace has been found on the east side.The outer bank of the moat is more than 8 meters wide. A double row of haniwa encircled this outer bank. The posterior circular portion was excavated in 1894 during the construction of the Nara Railway Line (now the JR West Nara Line), and it was discovered not to have been looted. The tracks cut directly across the tumulus. Subsequent excavations were conducted in 1915, 1962, 1972, 1975 and 2013.

The burial facilities include one long-box-shaped stone sarcophagus directly buried in the center of the posterior portion, and one combined wooden coffin directly buried in the west side. The stone sarcophagus is aligned north–south, parallel to the main axis of the tumulus. Made of six pieces of tuff (one cover stone, two side stones, two end stones, and one bottom stone), with rope protrusions on the cover stone and side stones, and small stone chambers (northern small stone chamber and southern small stone chamber) made of broken stone are also formed in front and behind the sarcophagus. It is currently preserved and exhibited at the Kyoto University Museum. Grave goods have been found in each, including iron swords, helms, magatama, bronze mirrors. The excavated artifacts and the stone sarcophagus have both been designated National Important Cultural Properties.

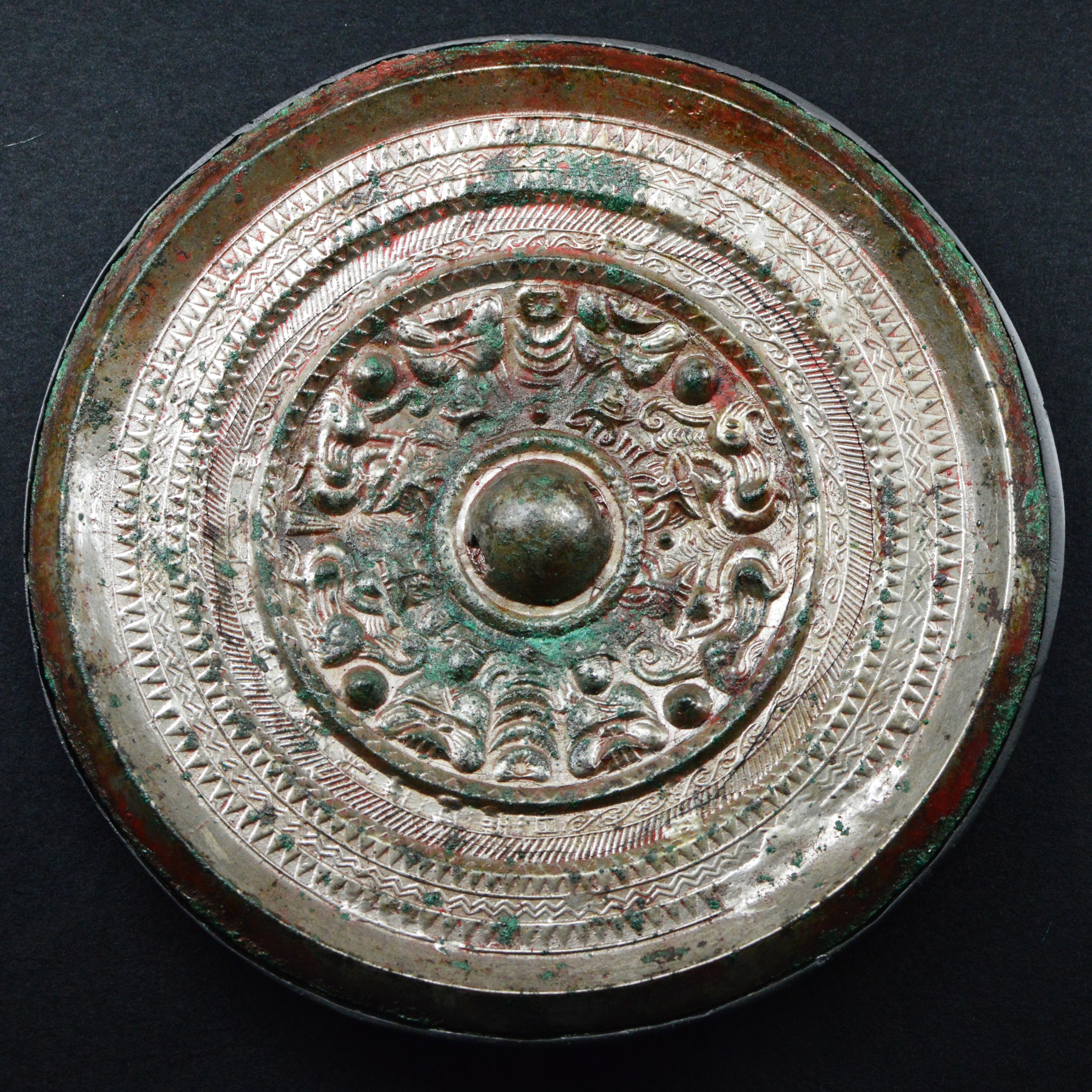
Triangular-rimmed Four Gods and Four Beasts Mirror (ICPOn display at the Izumiya Hakukokan Museum

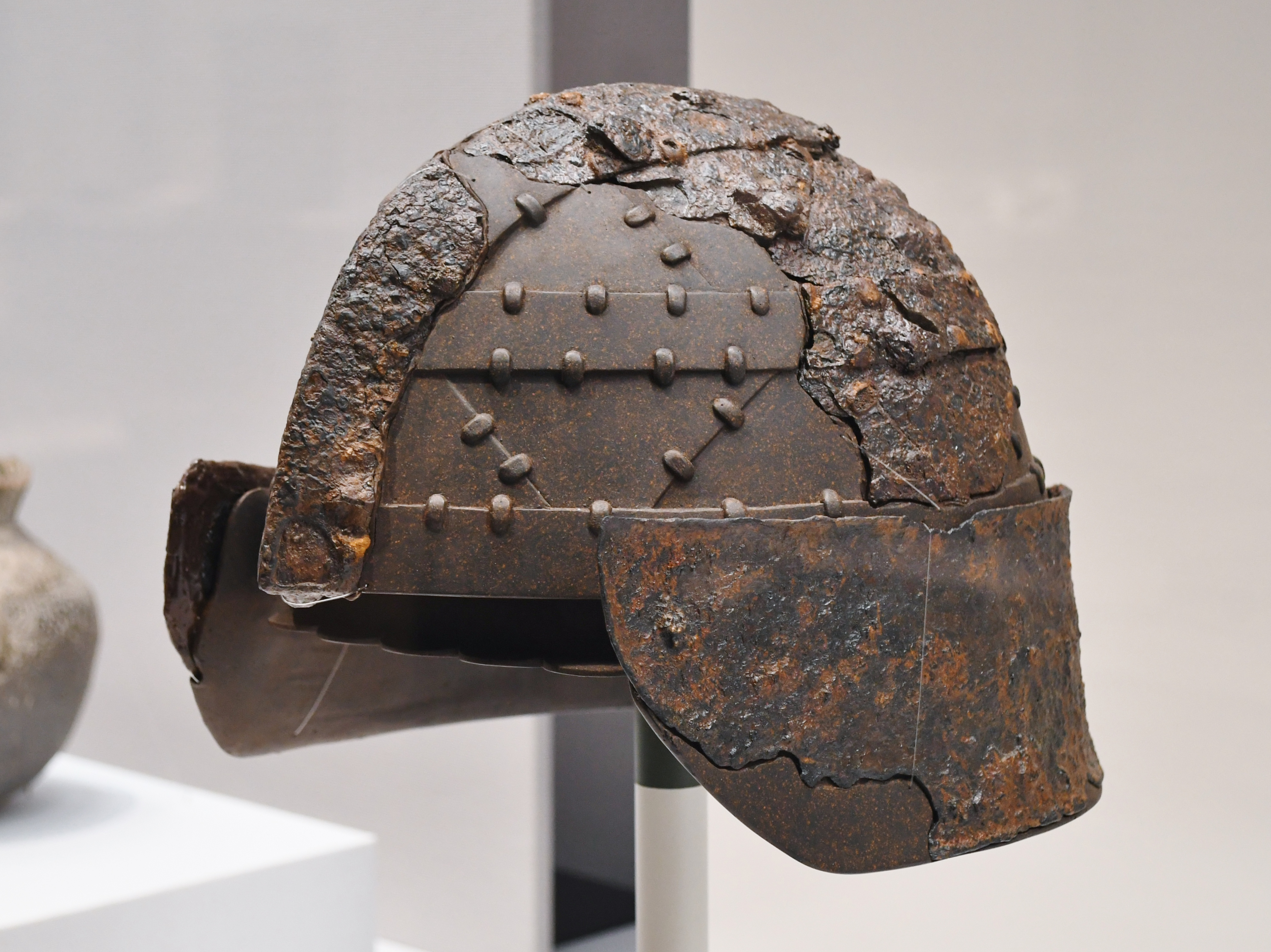
Helm On display at the Tokyo National Museum.

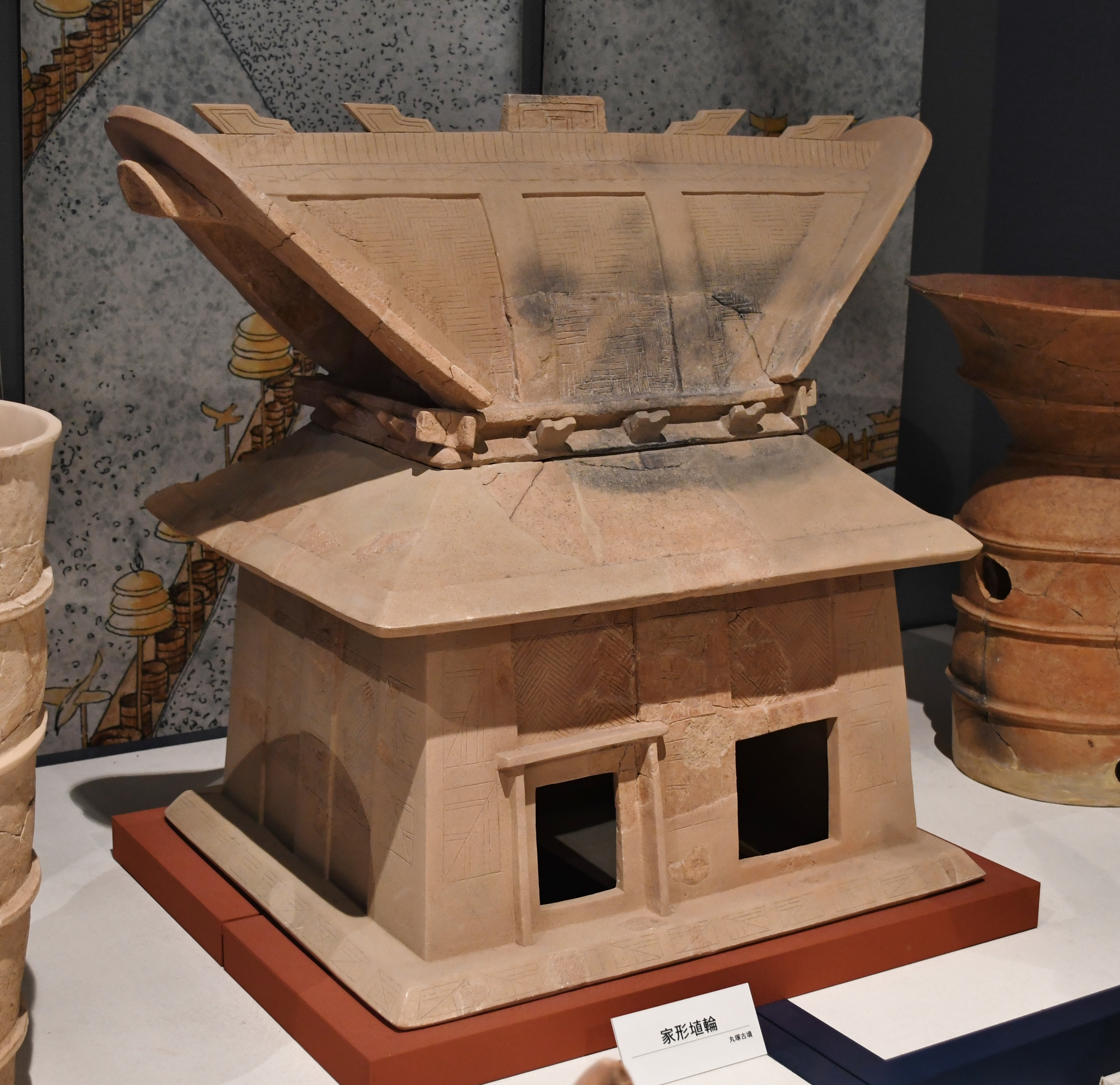
House-shaped haniwa from Maruzuka Kofun

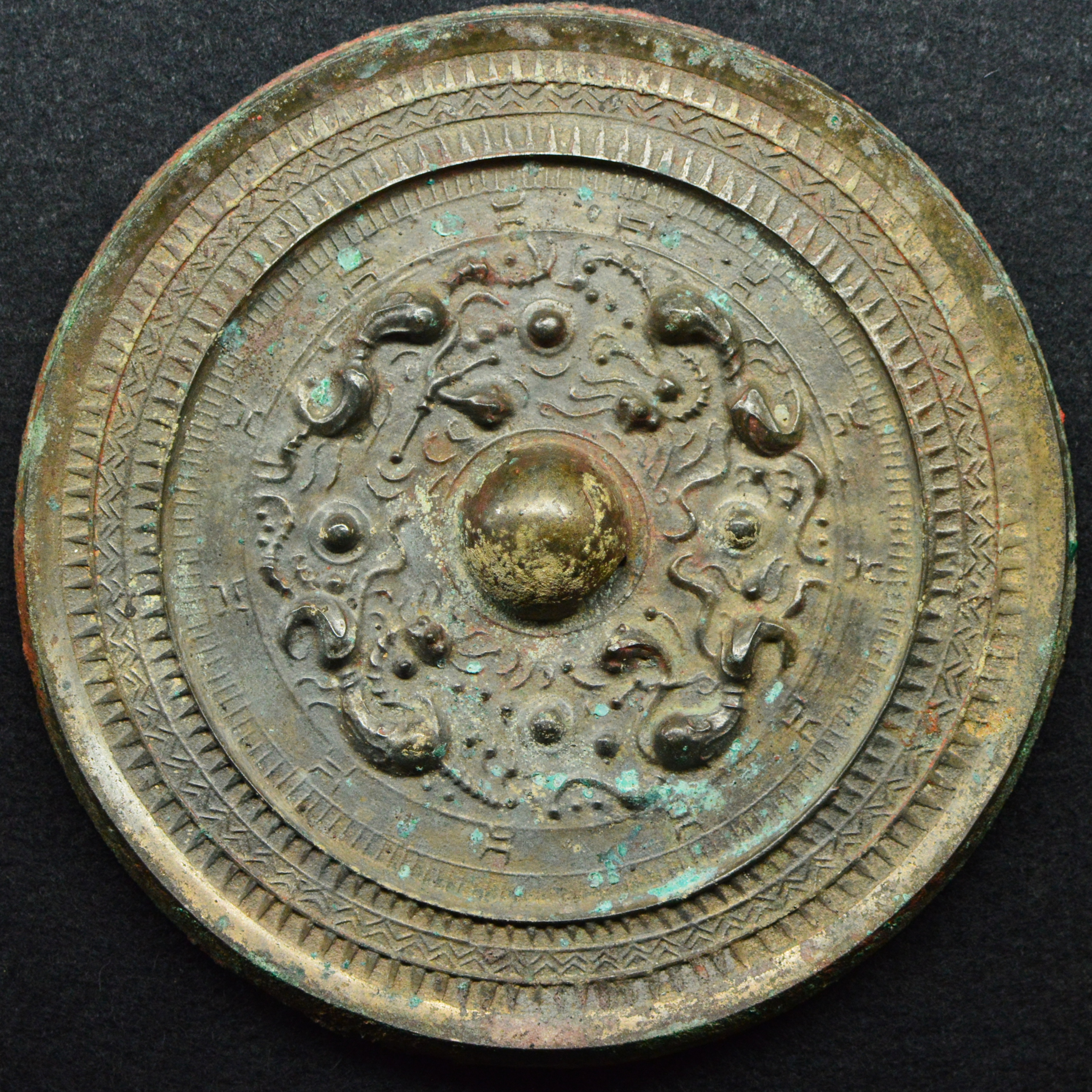
四獣形鏡（国の重要文化財）
泉屋博古館展示。

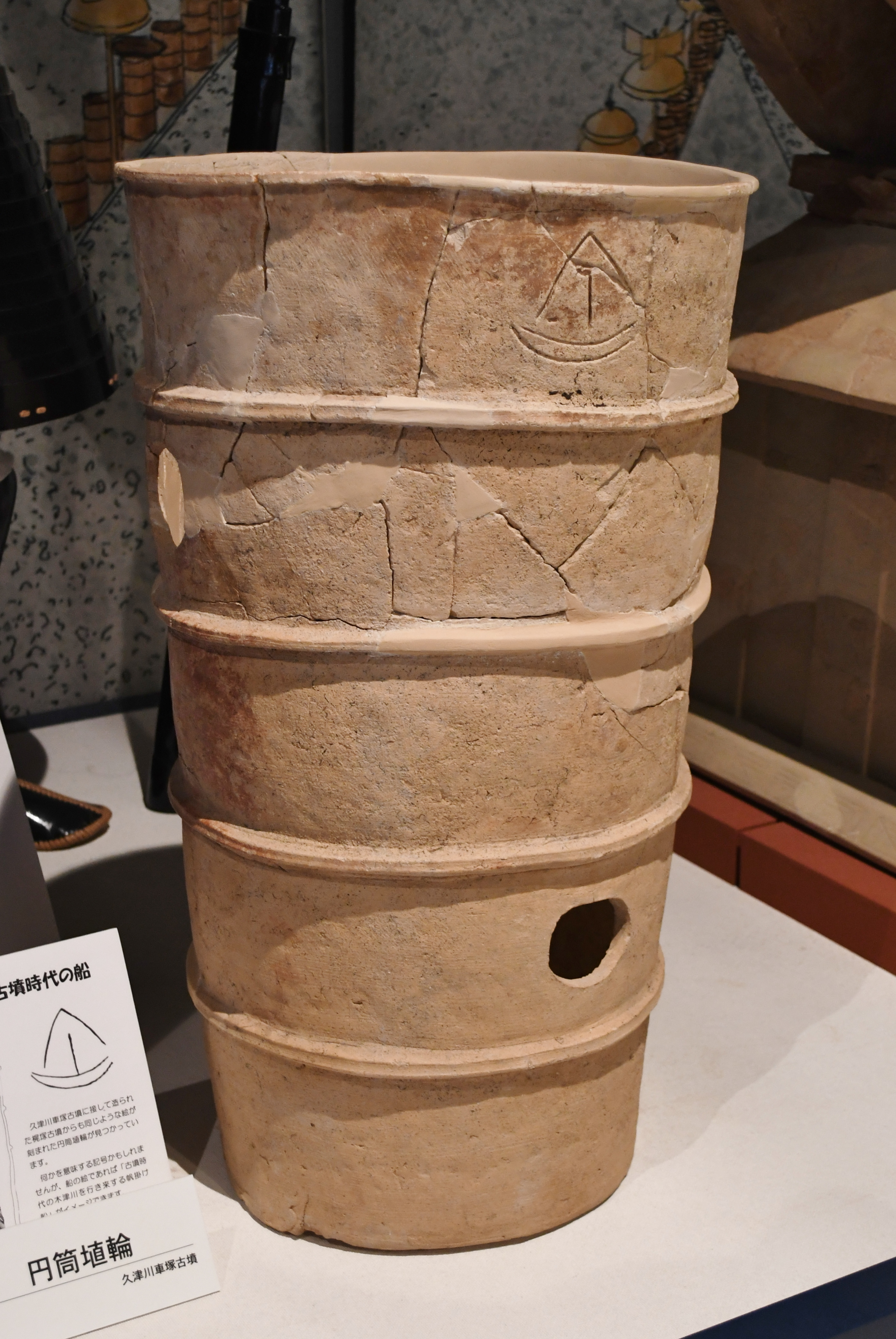
Cylindrical haniwa from Kutsukawa Kurumazuka Kofun

== Maruzuka Kofun ==
The Maruzuka Kofun (丸塚古墳) is shaped like a hotategaigata kofun (帆立貝形古墳, scallop shell.-shaped kofun) built on a hill on the right bank of the Kizu River in the northern part of Jōyō. The mound is built in two tiers at the rear and one tier at the front. The length of the tumulus is 80 meters. Cylindrical haniwa, morning glory-shaped haniwa, and figurative haniwa (house-shaped, lid-shaped, and armor-shaped haniwa) have been found on the outside of the mound, and one of the house-shaped haniwa is large, measuring about one meter in height. A moat of a similar shape surrounds the tumulus, and the total length is 80 meters, or 104 meters when including the moat. The posterior circular portion is 63 meters in diameter and 9.6 meters high, and the anterior rectangular portion is 17 meters in length and 32 meters wide. The burial facility is unclear as it has not been excavated. It is estimated to have been built around the same time as the Kutsugawa Kurumazuka Kofun, or around the first half of the 5th century.

== Bashōzuka Kofun ==
The Bashōzuka Kofun (芭蕉塚古墳) is a large zenpōkōenfun keyhole-shaped burial mound built on a hill on the right bank of the Kizu River in the northern part of Jōyō. The tumulus is covered with bamboo forest, and several archaeological excavations have been carried out. The tumulus is built in two tiers and is orientated to the south. It has a length of about 114 meters (161 meters including the moat]], making it the second largest in the Kutsugawa Kofun Cluster. The posterior circular portion has a diameter of 62.7 meters and the rextangular anterior portion has a width of 61.0 meters. The narrow part of the mound has projections on both sides. In addition to fukiishi roofing stones and rows of cylindrical haniwa, figurative haniwa (house-shaped, lid-shaped, quiver-shaped, shield-shaped, armor-shaped, and enclosure-shaped) have been discovered on the outside of the mound.The enclosure-shaped haniwa in particular are placed in the valley between the circular mound and the projections, and are noteworthy as an indication that the valley between the mound and the projections was used as a water channel and spring water ritual space at the time of construction. A shield-shaped moat surrounded the mound (part of which remains on the south side), and a row of large cylindrical haniwa has also been discovered on the outer bank. The burial facility is a clay coffin in the center of the circular mound, parallel to the main axis of the mound. This clay coffin has been the victim of large-scale grave robbing, and excavation surveys have uncovered armor fragments that are thought to be part of grave goods. The construction date is estimated to be around the middle of the 5th century, during the middle Kofun period.

== Kuze Elementary School Kofun ==
The Kuze Elementary School Kofun (久世小学校古墳) is an enpun-style circular tumulus located in the courtyard of Kuze Elementary School. It is also known as Shibagahara Kofun No. 9. The tumulus is built in two tiers, measuring 27.5 meters in diameter and 3.5 meters in height. On the outside of the tumulus, rows of cylindrical haniwa can be seen on the flat surfaces and top of the tiers, as well as figurative haniwa (house-shaped, lid-shaped, armor-shaped, and quiver-shaped) and fukiishi roofing stones have been found. It is believed that there was a moat around the mound, but it is unclear as the area was leveled during the construction of the elementary school. The burial facility was a wooden coffin buried directly in the center of the top of the mound, and two short-necked ceramic jars with handles were found in the grave pit. Based on these excavated remains, the tumulus is estimated to have been built in the mid-5th century during the middle of the Kofun period.

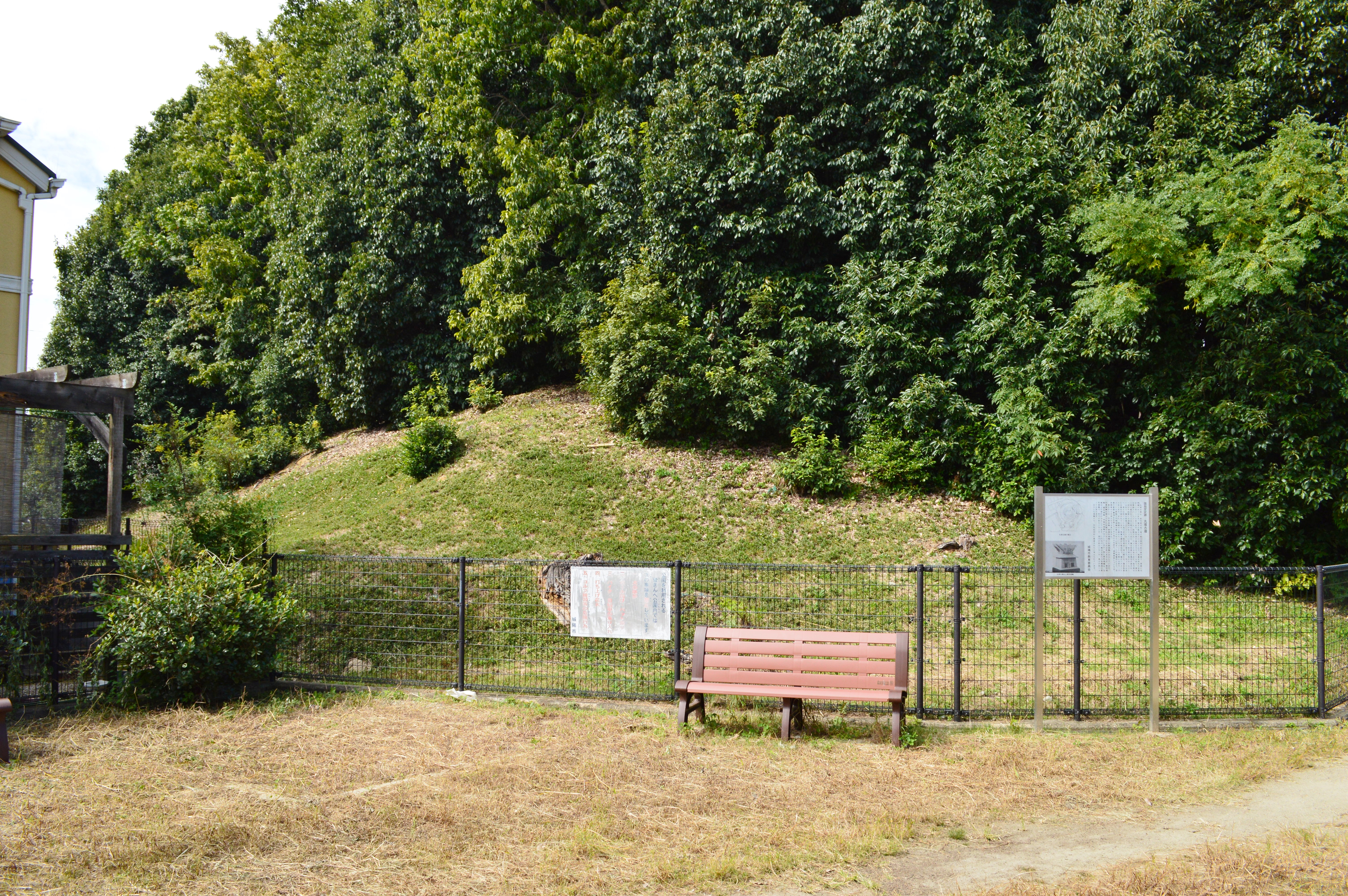
Maruzuka Kofun

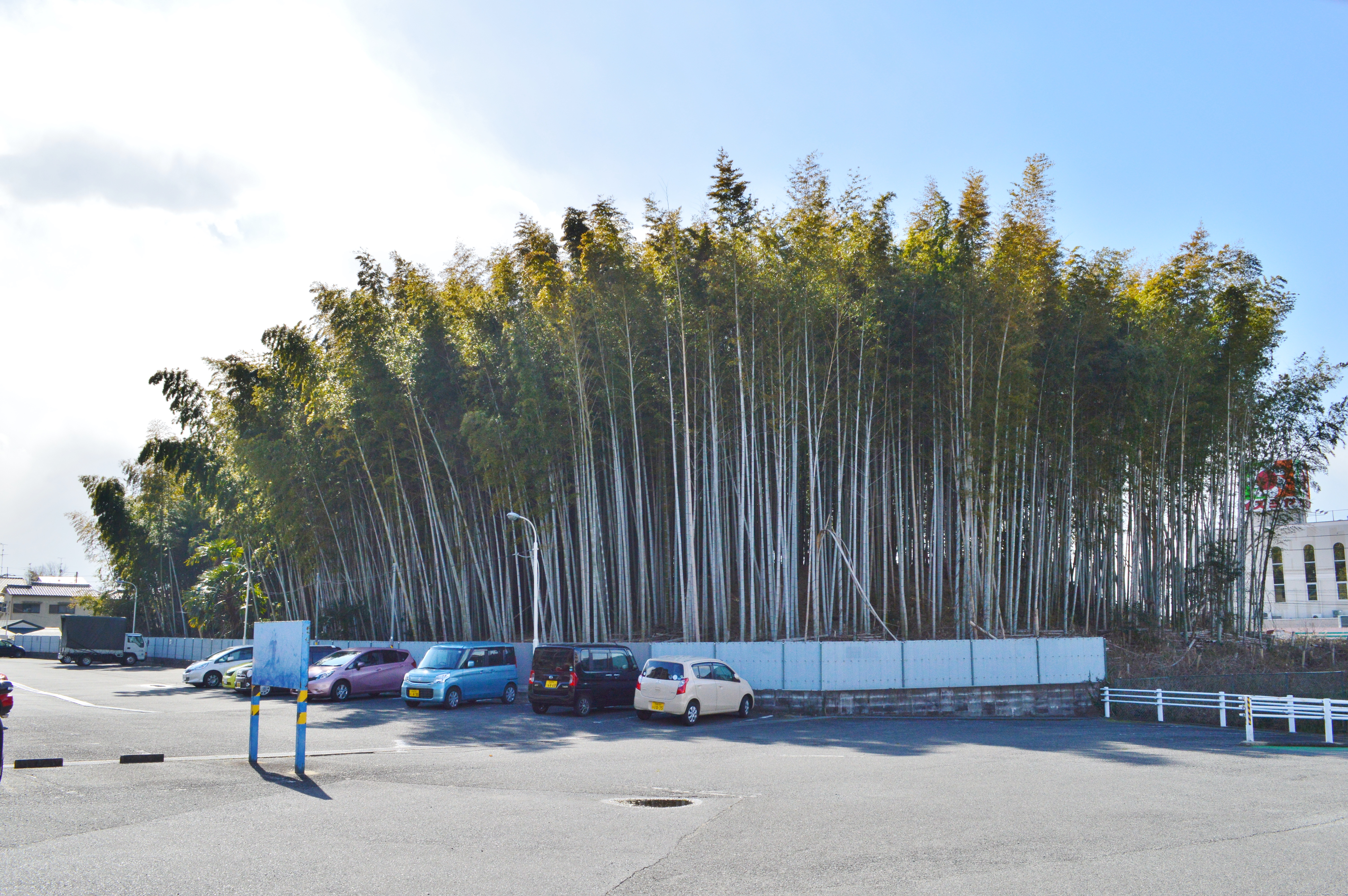
Bashōzuka Kofun

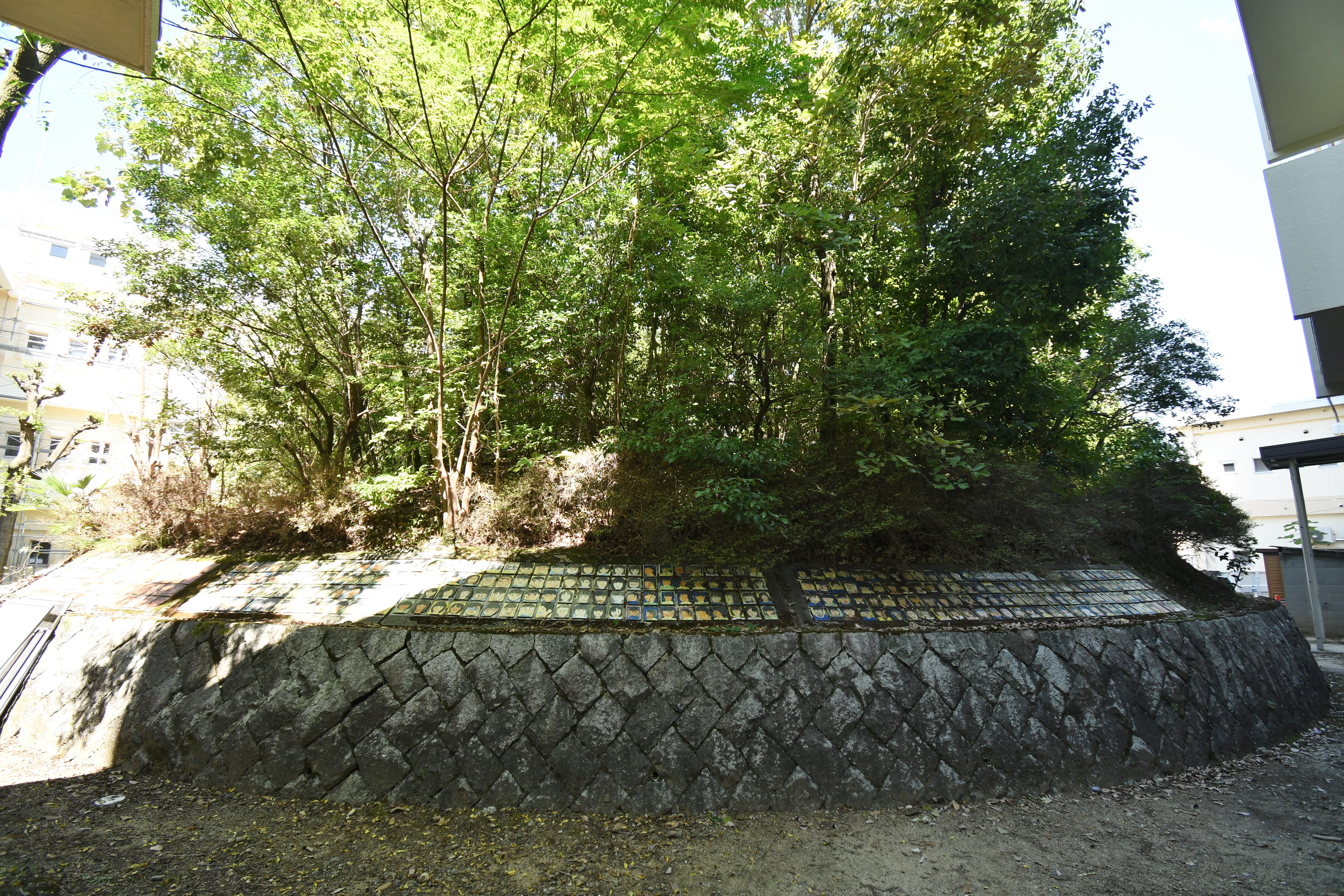
Kuze Elementary School Kofun

The Kutsukawa Kurumazuka Kofun is approximately ten-minutes on foot from Kutsukawa Station on the Kintetsu Kyoto Line or 20-minutes from Jōyō Station on the JR West Nara Line.

== See also ==
- List of Historic Sites of Japan (Kyoto)
