= Shōdō Kanga ruins =

Ancient ruins in Jōyō, Kyoto, Japan

- 正道官衙遺跡 (Japanese)
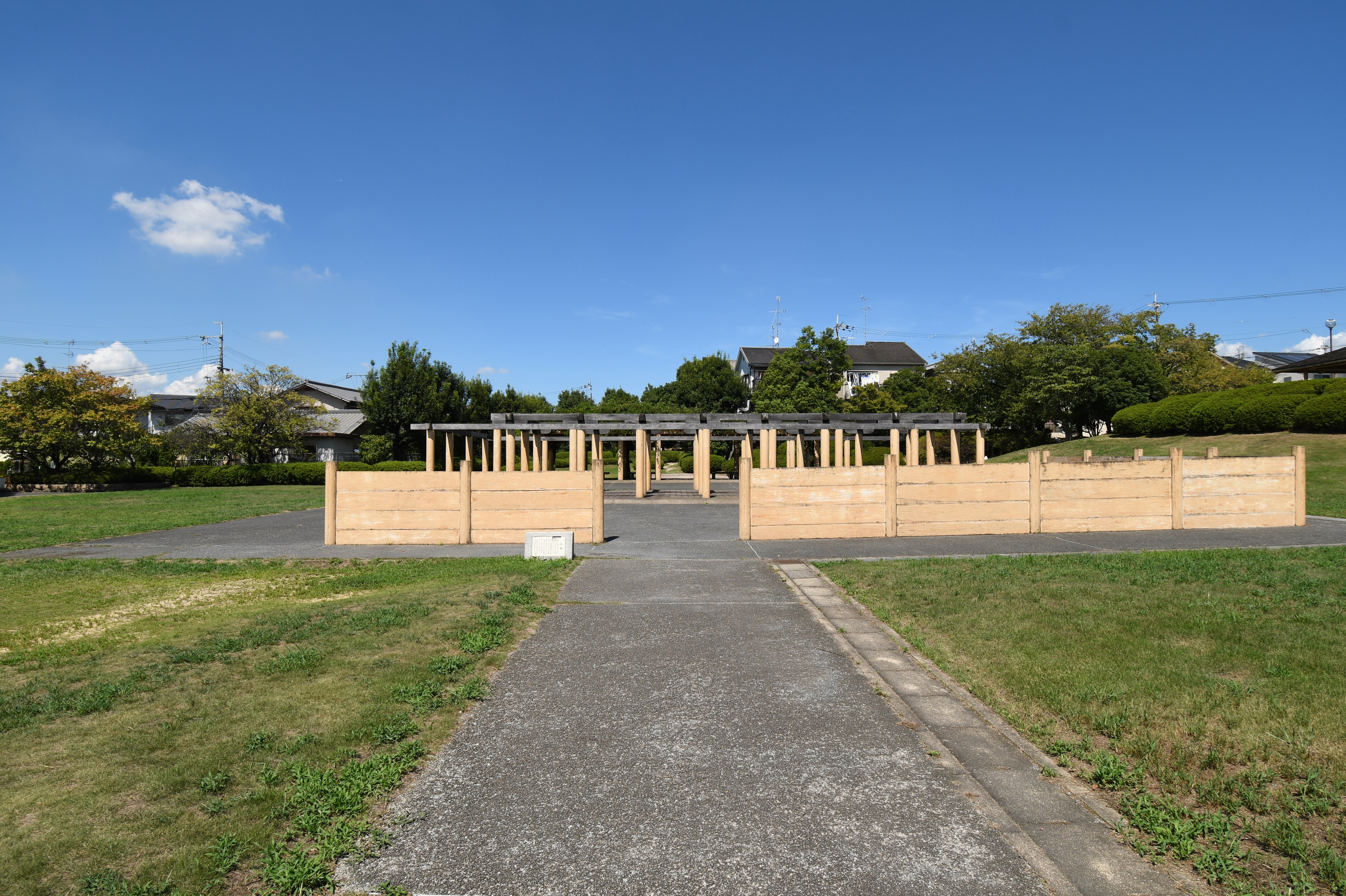
- Shōdō Kanga ruins

- Shōdō Kanga ruins Shōdō Kanga ruins (Japan)
- Interactive map of Shōdō Kanga ruins
- 34°51′37.35″N 135°47′3.26″E
- Periods: Nara - Heian period
- Location: Jōyō, Kyoto, Japan
- Region: Kinai region

History
- Built: 8th century AD

Site notes
- Public access: No

The Shōdō Kanga ruins (正道官衙遺跡, Shōdō kanga iseki) is an archaeological site with the ruins of a Nara to Heian period government administrative complex located in what is now the Terada-Shōdō neighborhood of the city of Jōyō, Kyoto, in the Kinai region of Japan. It has been protected as a National Historic Site from 1974, with the area under protection expanded in 2006

== Overview ==
In the late Nara period, after the establishment of a centralized government under the Ritsuryō system, local rule over the provinces was standardized under a kokufu (provincial capital), and each province was divided into smaller administrative districts, known as (郡, gun, kōri), composed of 2–20 townships in 715 AD.

The Shōdō Kanga ruins are located on a south-facing plateau at an elevation of 40 to 50 meters on the east bank of the Kizugawa River. In 1965, pieces of roof tiles and pottery were found on the shore of a pond at the west end of the plateau, and it was assumed that an unknown ancient Buddhist temple had been there, so the area was originally named the Shōdō temple ruins (正道廃寺跡) after the place name. A large-scale archaeological excavation that began in February 1973 uncovered the remains of a group of dug-out pillared buildings, which were assumed to be the central part of the kanga (government office complex) of the Nara period rather than temple ruins, and the site was renamed accordingly. Afterwards it was discovered that there were the foundations for a group of buildings on the west side of the ruins.

This site is a complex site consisting of a small-scale kofun burial mound from the 5th century, village remains from the latter half of the 6th century to the 7th century, and the group of large, pillared buildings arranged in an orderly manner from the late 7th century. Based on the historical and geographical background and excavated artifacts, the site corresponds to the presumed location for the government headquarters for ancient Kuse District, Yamashiro Province. After its designation as a National Historic Site in 1974, approximately 10,850 square meters of the site was acquired by Jōyō city, and the excavation was backfilled for preservation. However, no further action was taken on the cite until 1989 when plans for an archaeological park with partial reconstructions of buildings was formulated. The park opened in 1992. It is located about a 15 minutes walk from Jōyō Station on the JR West Nara Line.

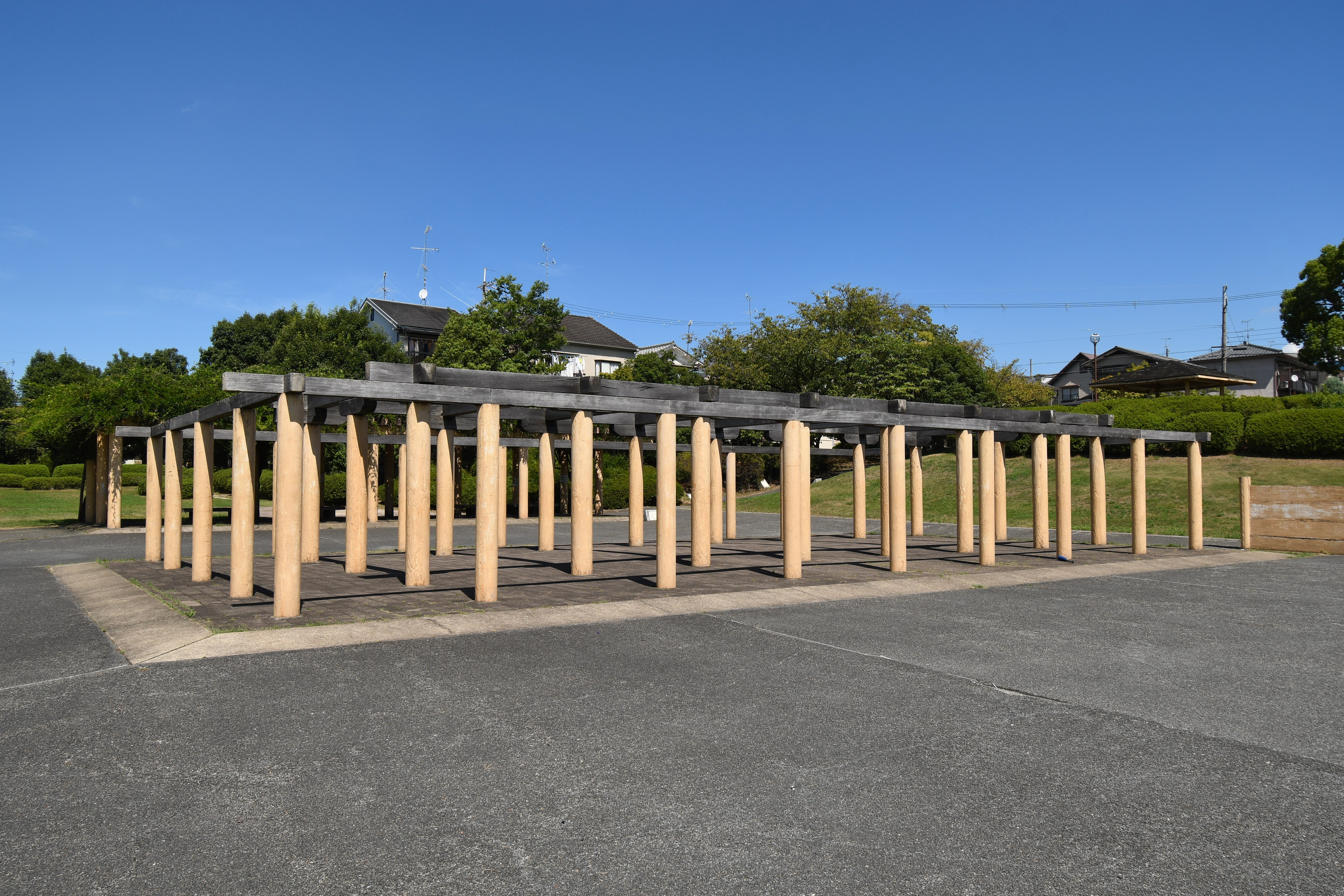
Main Structure

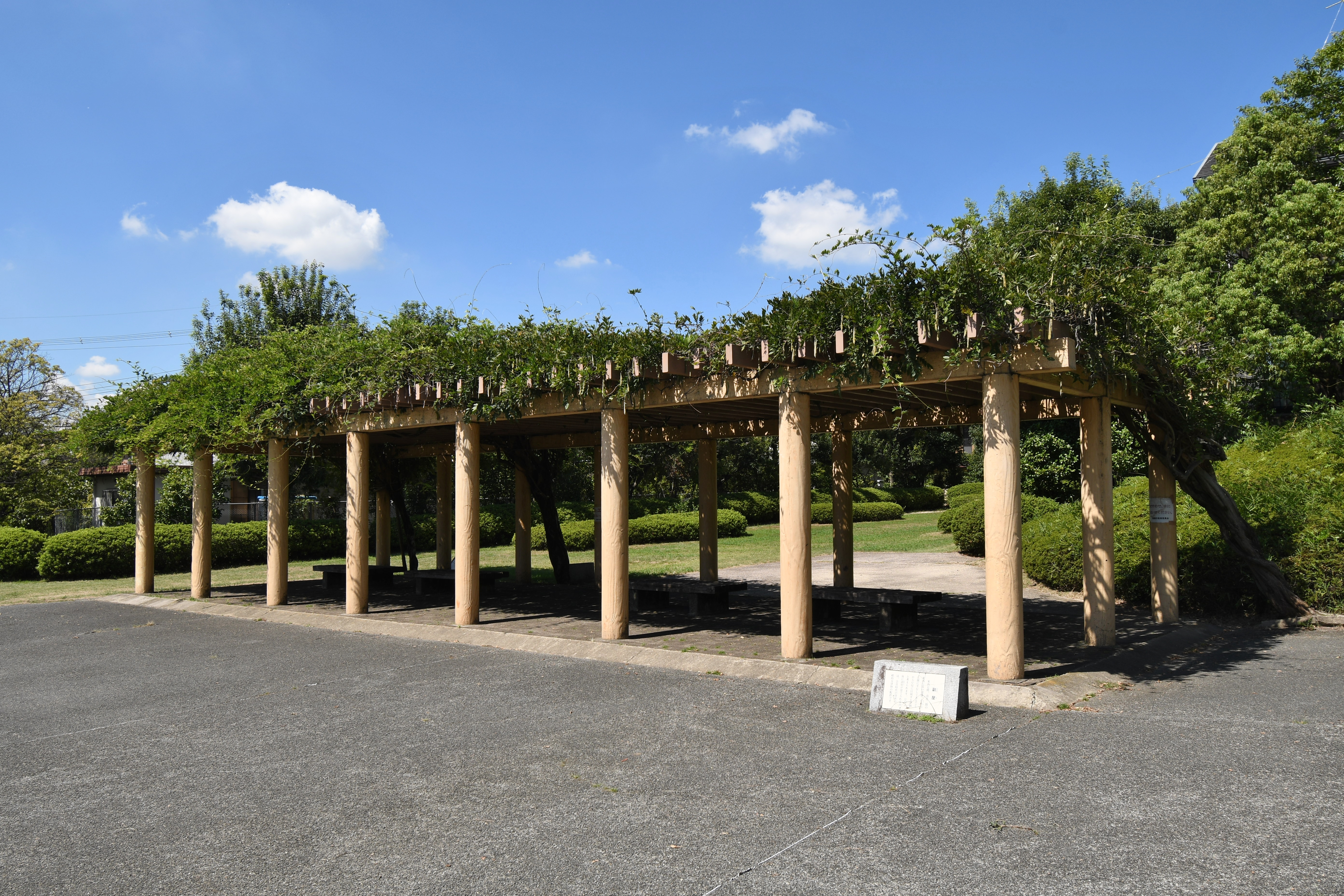
Side Structure

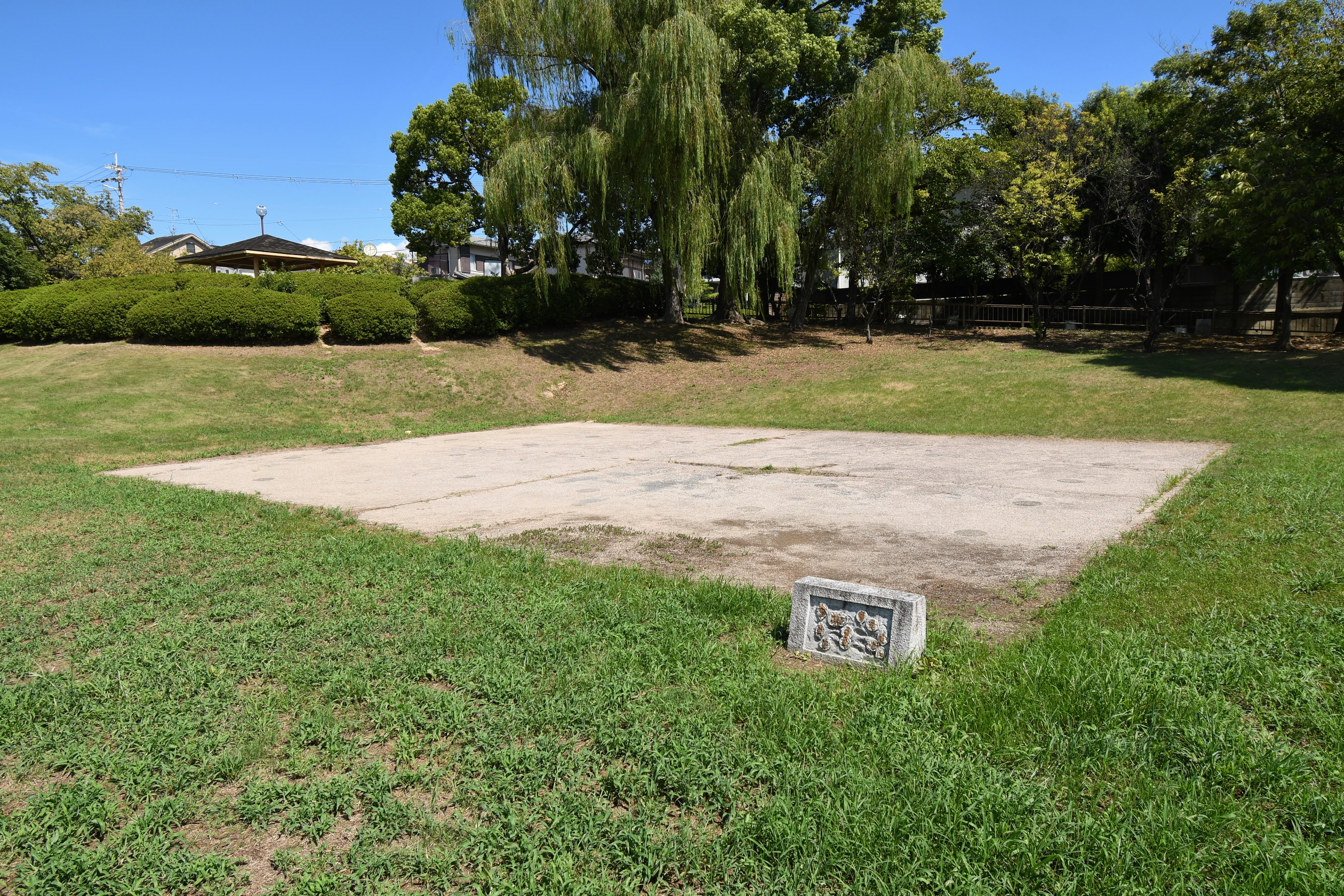
East Structure

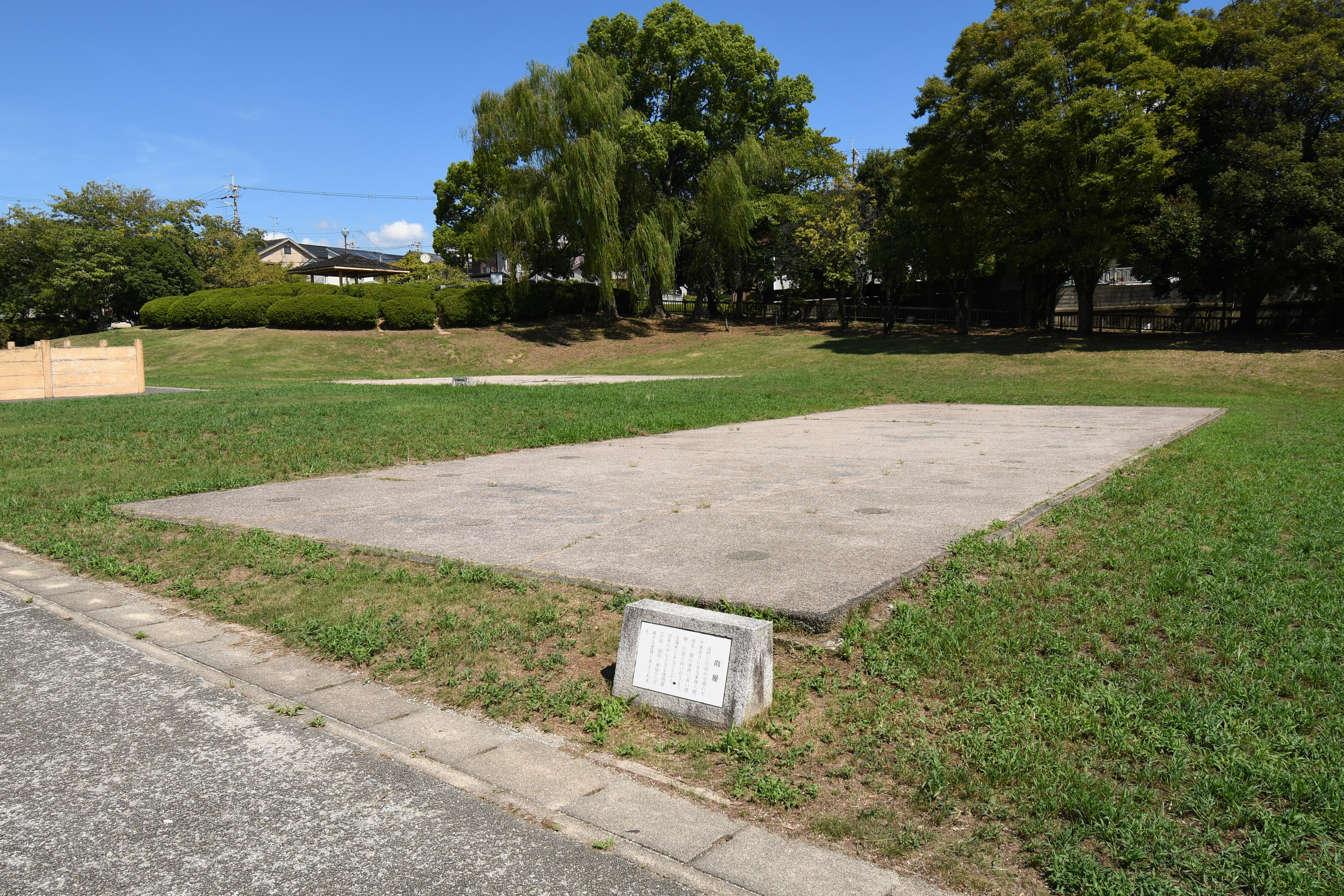
Opposing Structure

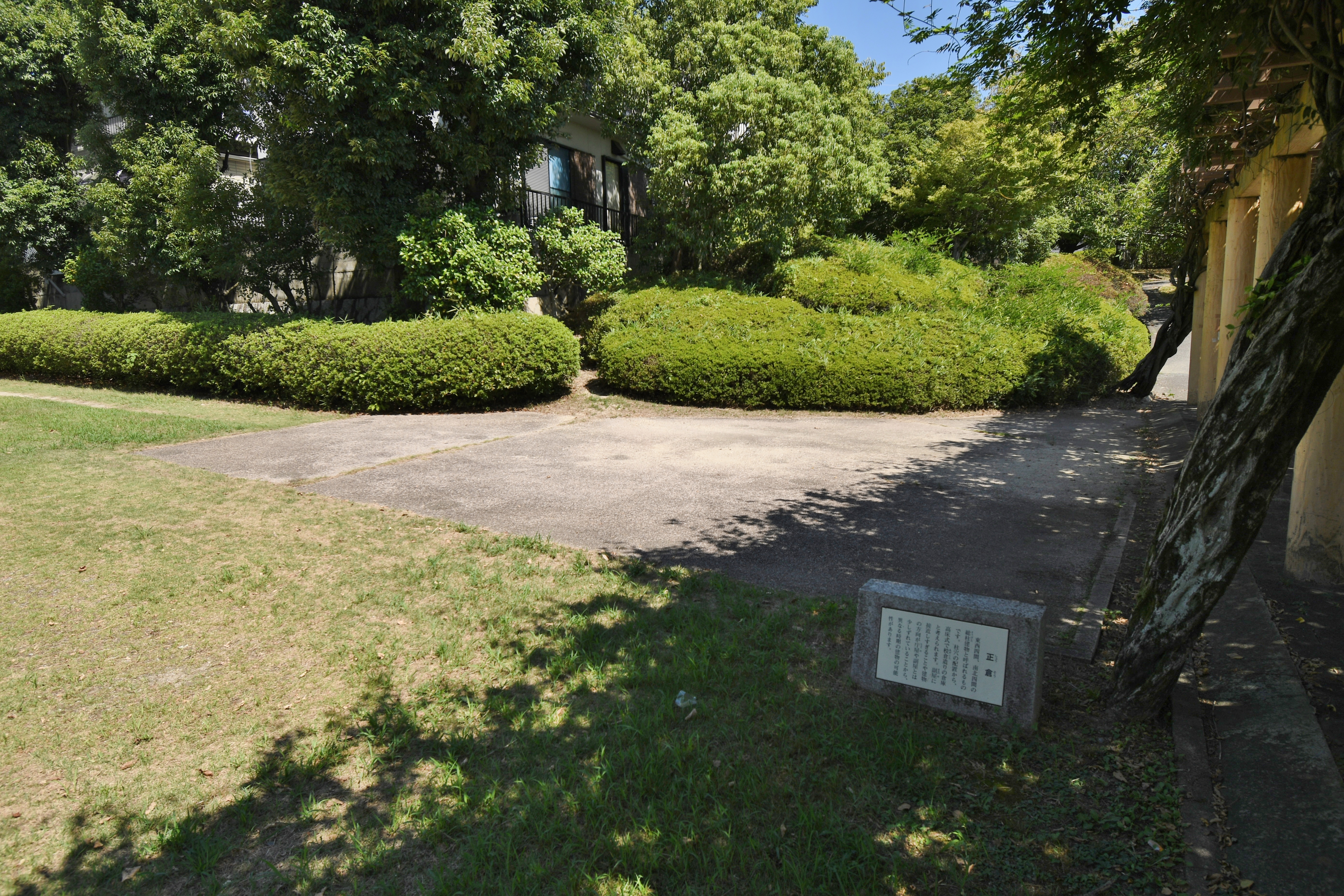
Warehouse foundations

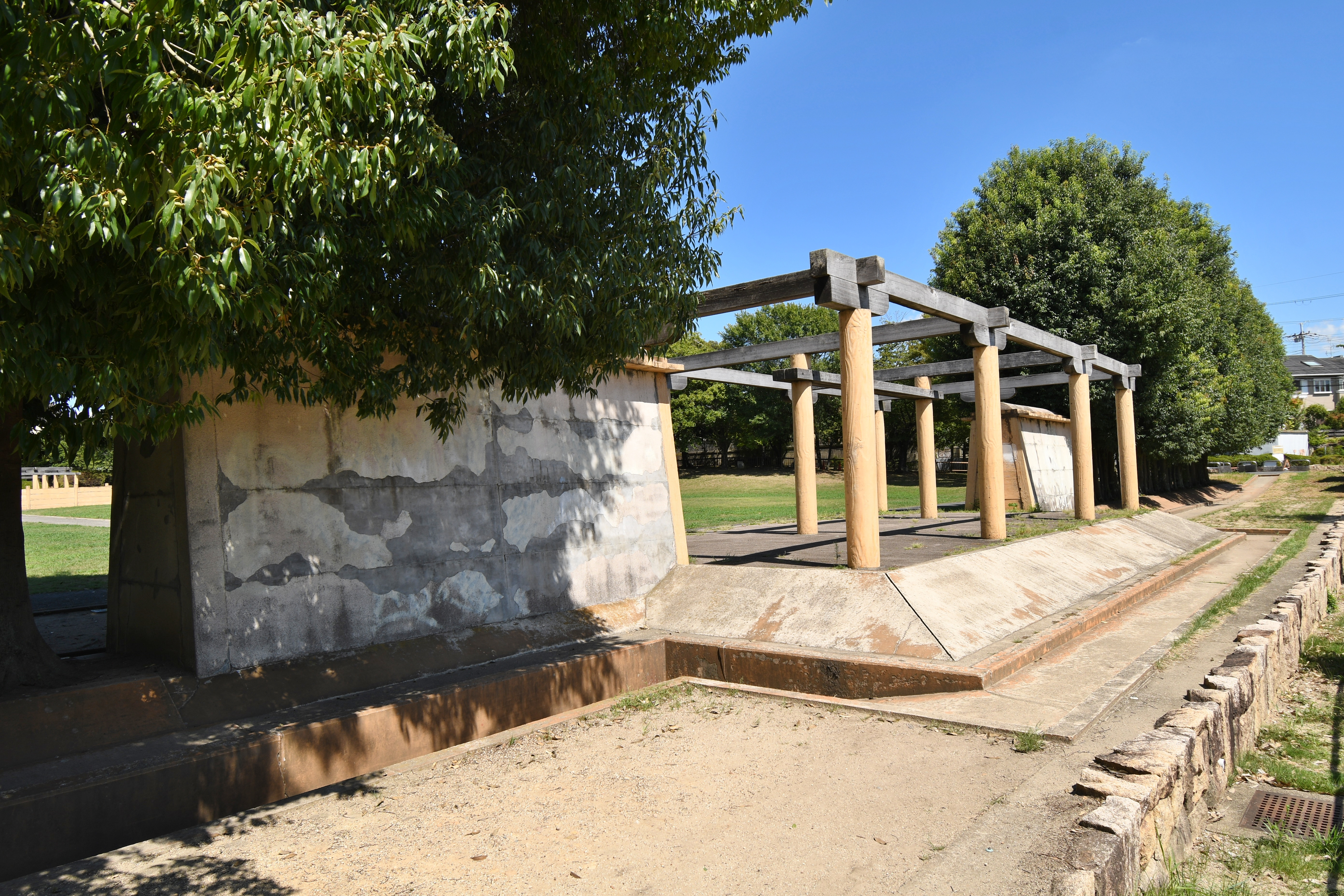
South Gate

== See also ==
- List of Historic Sites of Japan (Kyoto)
