= Shin-Tanabe Station =

Railway station in Kyōtanabe, Kyoto Prefecture, Japan

Shin-Tanabe Station 新田辺駅
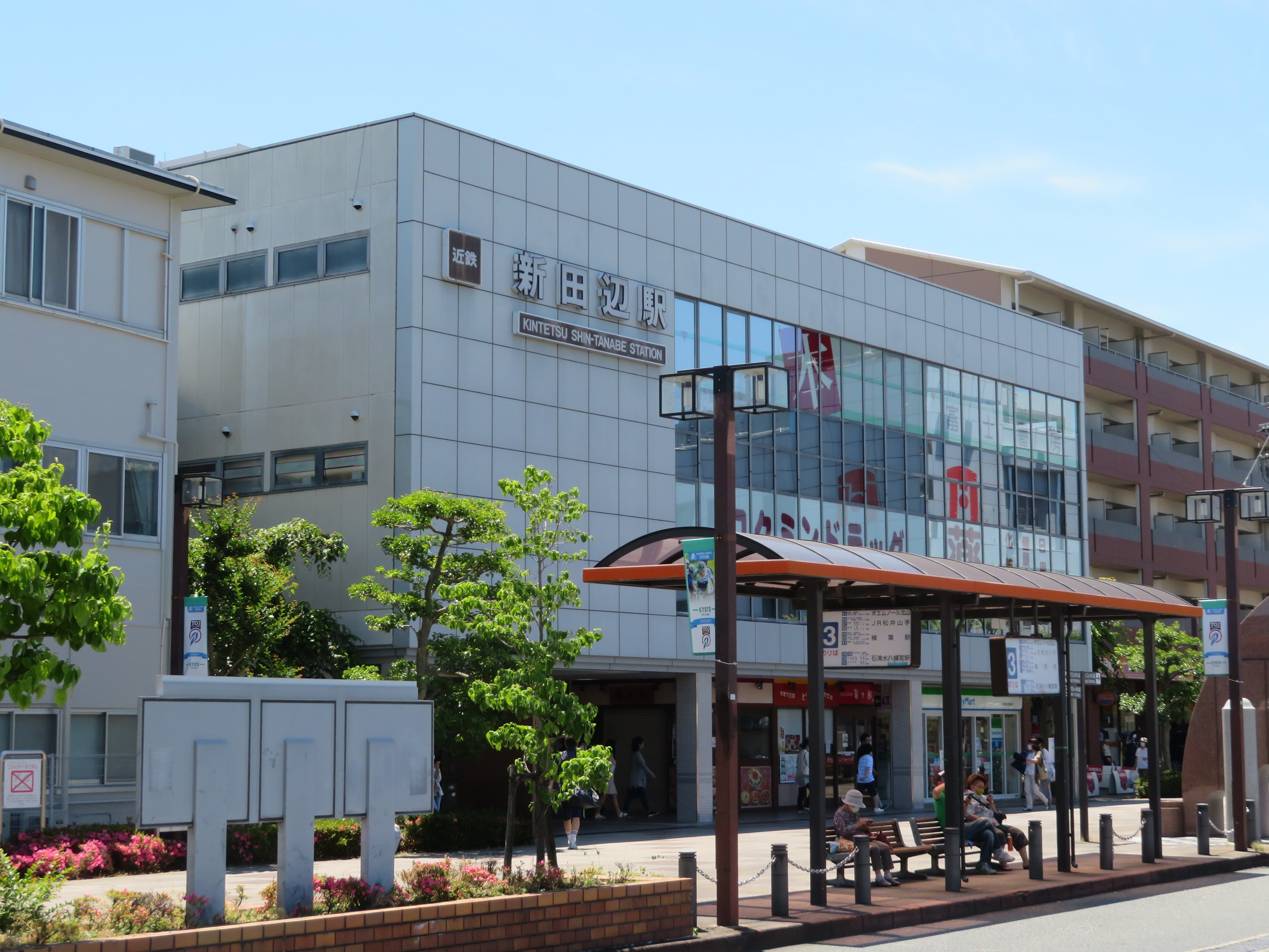
- Shin-Tanabe Station, June 2020

General information
- Location: Kawarashokuden, Kyōtanabe-shi, Kyoto-fu 610-0361; Japan
- Coordinates: 34°49′15.08″N 135°46′22.34″E
- System: Kintetsu Railway commuter rail station
- Owner: Kintetsu Railway
- Operator: Kintetsu Railway
- Line: Kyoto/Kashihara Line
- Distance: 19.6 km from Kyoto
- Platforms: 2 island platforms
- Connections: Bus terminal

Other information
- Station code: B15
- Website: Official website

History
- Opened: 3 November 1928

Passengers
- FY2019: 26,060 daily

Services
Preceding station	Kintetsu Railway	Following station
Tonoshō towards Kyōto	Kyoto Line Local Semi-Express	Kōdo towards Yamato-Saidaiji
Ōkubo towards Kyōto	Kyoto Line Express	Shin-Hosono towards Yamato-Saidaiji
Ōkubo towards Kyōto	Kyoto Line Express	Kōdo towards Yamato-Saidaiji
Location
- Location within Kyoto Prefecture Location within Japan

Shin-Tanabe Station (新田辺駅, Shin-Tanabe-eki) is a passenger railway station located in the city of Kyōtanabe, Kyoto, Japan, operated by the private transportation company, Kintetsu Railway. It is station number B18.

== Lines ==
Shin-Tanabe Station is served by the Kyoto Line, and is located 19.6 rail kilometers from the terminus of the line at Kyoto Station. Local trains to/from the Karasuma Line subway turn at Shin-Tanabe Station, while express trains go further to Kintetsu Nara Station.

== Station layout ==
The station consists of two elevated island platforms, with and elevated station building.The platform has a usable length of six cars. There is only one ticket gate. There are entrances on the east and west sides, with a station building attached to the west side.

=== Platforms ===
1, 2	■ Kintetsu Kyoto Line	For Yamato-Saidaiji, Kintetsu Nara, and Kashiharajingu-mae
3, 4	■ Kintetsu Kyoto Line	For Kintetsu-Tambabashi, and Kyoto

== Adjacent stations ==
←	Service	→
Kyoto Line (Kintetsu)
Ōkubo	Express	Shin-Hōsono
Ōkubo	Express (From Kyoto bound for Miyazu)	Kōdo
Tonoshō	Semi-Express	Terminus
Tonoshō	Local	Kōdo

== History ==
Shin-Tanabe Station opened on 3 November 1928 as a station on the Nara Electric Railway. The Nara Electric Railway was merged into the Kintetsu group in 1963. The tracks were elevated and the station completed in 1988.

== Passenger statistics ==
In fiscal 2019, the station was used by an average of 26,060 passengers daily.

== Surrounding area ==
- Kyoto Prefectural Tanabe High School
- Kyoto International University
- Kyōtanabe Station
- Tanabe Central Hospital

== See also ==
- List of railway stations in Japan
