= Tonoshō Station =

Railway station in Jōyō, Kyoto Prefecture, Japan

Tonoshō Station 富野荘駅
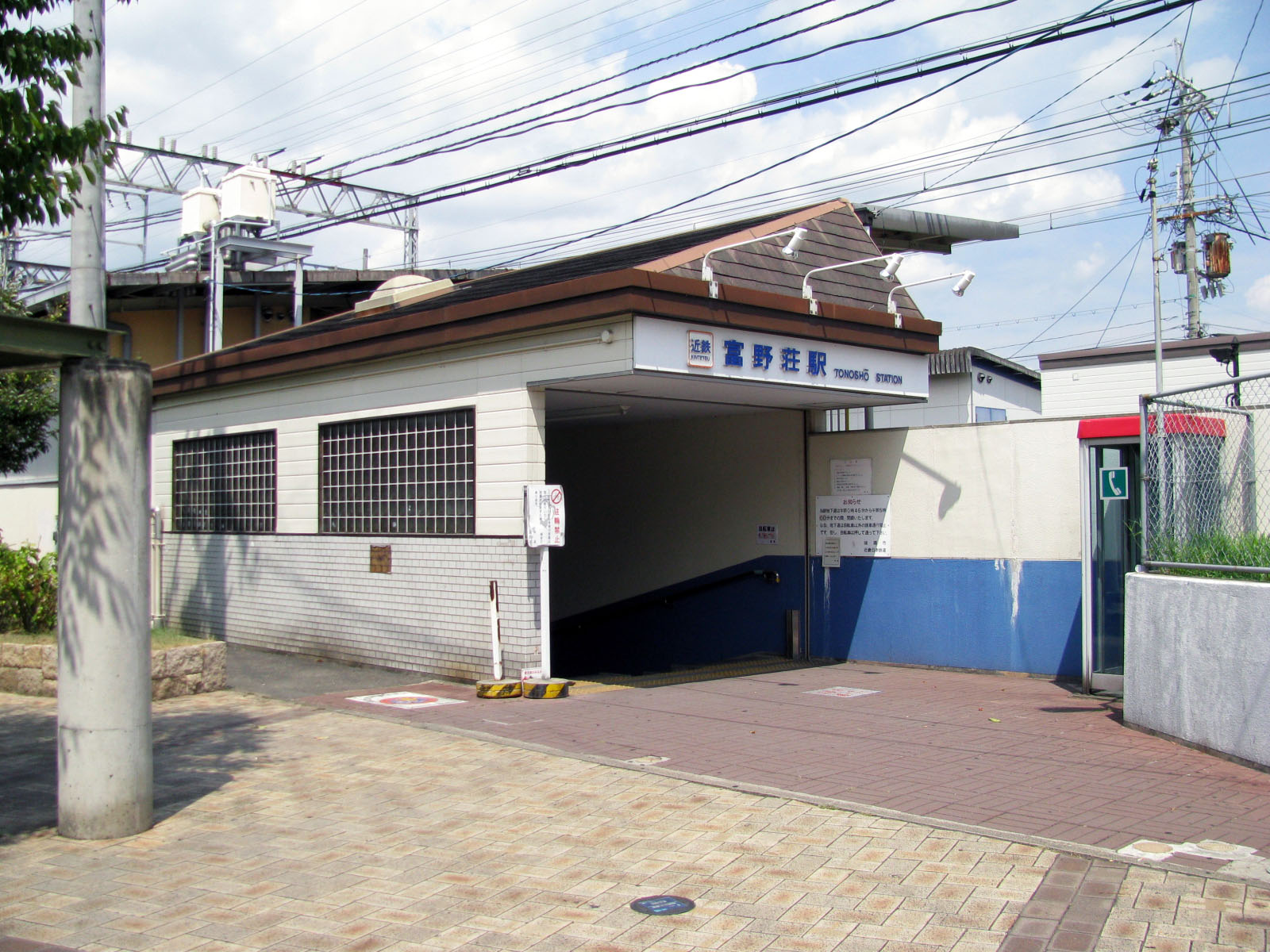
- Tonoshō Station

General information
- Location: 58 Kaseda Biwanoshō, Jōyō-shi, Kyoto-fu 610-0117; Japan
- Coordinates: 34°50′23.54″N 135°46′22.46″E
- System: Kintetsu Railway commuter rail station
- Owner: Kintetsu Railway
- Operator: Kintetsu Railway
- Line: Kyoto/Kashihara Line
- Distance: 17.4 km from Kyoto
- Platforms: 2 side platforms
- Connections: Bus terminal

Other information
- Station code: B15
- Website: Official website

History
- Opened: 3 November 1928

Passengers
- FY2022: 5500 daily

Services
Preceding station	Kintetsu Railway	Following station
Terada towards Kyōto	Kyoto Line Local Semi-Express	Shin-Tanabe towards Yamato-Saidaiji
Location
- Location within Kyoto Prefecture Location within Japan

Tonoshō Station (富野荘駅, Tonoshō-eki) is a passenger railway station located in the city of Jōyō, Kyoto, Japan, operated by the private transportation company, Kintetsu Railway. It is station number B15.

== Lines ==
Tonoshō Station is served by the Kyoto Line, and is located 17.4 rail kilometers from the terminus of the line at Kyoto Station.

== Station layout ==
The station consists of two opposed side platforms, with ticket gates and concourses underground. The effective length of the platform is trains with a length of 6 cars.

=== Platforms ===
1	■ Kintetsu Kyoto Line	For Kashiharajingu-mae
2	■ Kintetsu Kyoto Line	For Kyoto

== History ==
Tonoshō Station opened on 3 November 1928 as a station on the Nara Electric Railway, which merged with Kintetsu in 1963.

== Passenger statistics ==
In fiscal 2022, the station was used by an average of 5500 passengers daily.

== Surrounding area ==
- Kyoto Prefectural Nishijoyo High School
- Joyo City Imaike Elementary School

== See also ==
- List of railway stations in Japan
