= Ōkubo Station (Kyoto) =

Railway station in Uji, Kyoto Prefecture, Japan

Ōkubo Station 大久保駅
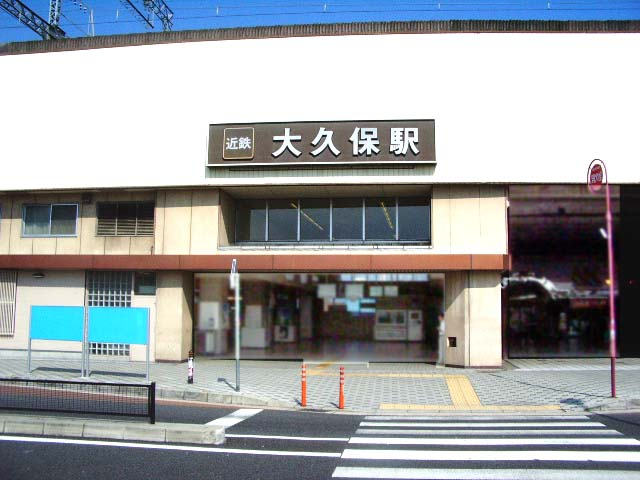
- Ōkubo Station, West Exit

General information
- Location: Nishiura-81-2 Hironocho, Uji-shi, Kyoto-fu 611-0031; Japan
- Coordinates: 34°52′28.3″N 135°46′37.5″E
- System: Kintetsu Railway commuter rail station
- Owner: Kintetsu Railway
- Operator: Kintetsu Railway
- Line: Kyoto/Kashihara Line
- Distance: 13.6 km from Kyoto
- Platforms: 2 island platforms

Construction
- Structure type: elevated

Other information
- Station code: B12
- Website: www.kintetsu.co.jp/station/station_info/station05016.html

History
- Opened: 3 November 1928

Passengers
- FY2023: 22,040

Services
Preceding station	Kintetsu Railway	Following station
Iseda towards Kyōto	Kyoto Line Local Semi-Express	Kutsukawa towards Yamato-Saidaiji
Momoyamagoryō-mae towards Kyōto	Kyoto Line Express	Shin-Tanabe towards Yamato-Saidaiji
Location
- Location within Kyoto Prefecture Location within Japan

Ōkubo Station (大久保駅, Ōkubo-eki) is a passenger railway station located in the city of Uji, Kyoto, Japan. It is operated by the private railway operator Kintetsu Railway.It is station number B12.Fushimi-Momoyama Station on the Keihan Main Line and Momoyama Station on the JR Nara Line are within walking distance from Momoyamagoryō-mae Station.

== Lines ==
Ōkubo Station is served by the Kyoto Line, and is located 13.6 kilometers from the terminus of the line at Kyoto Station.

== Station layout ==
The station consists two elevated island platforms, with an effective platform length of six cars.The ticket gates and concourse are on the first floor, and there is only one ticket gate. The station is staffed. The station has a station plaza on the east side with bus and taxi stands and private car parking, and a wide road on the west side.

=== Platforms ===
1, 2	■ Kintetsu Kyoto Line	for Kintetsu Nara, Tenri and Kashiharajingu-mae
3, 4	■ Kintetsu Kyoto Line	for Kyoto

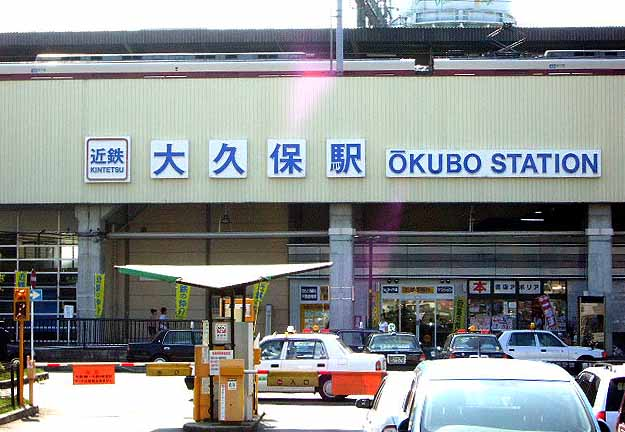
East Exit

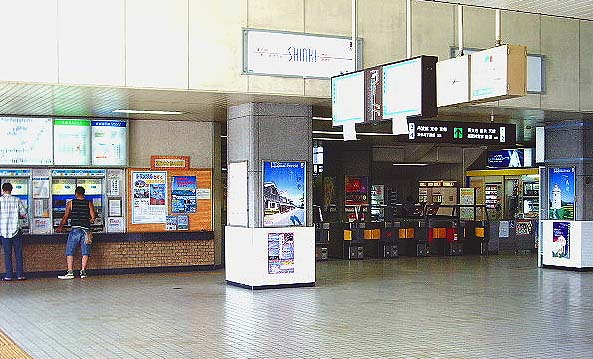
Ticket Gate

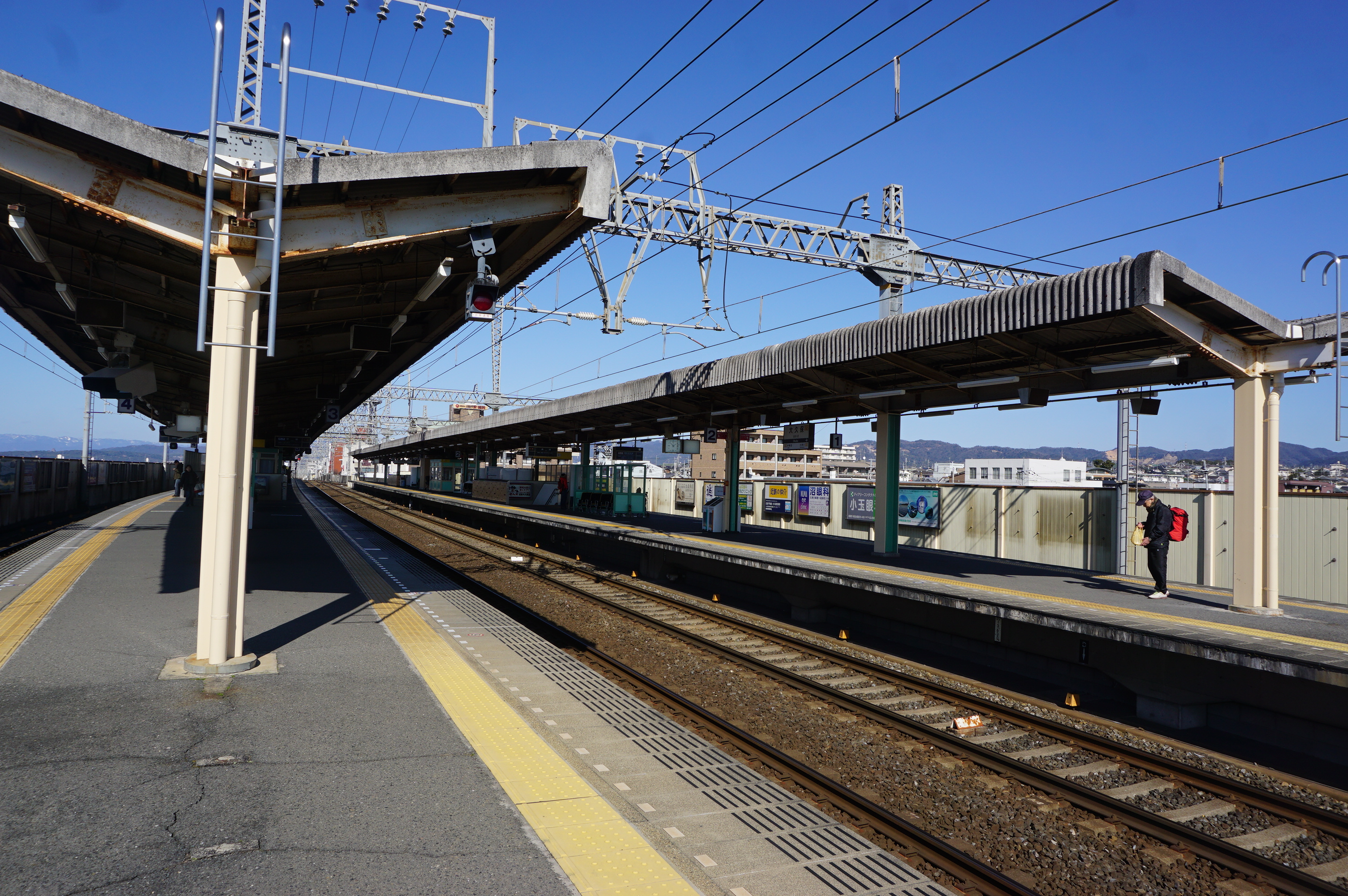
Platforms

== History ==
The station opened on 3 November 1928 as a station of Nara Electric Railroad. Nara Electric Railroad merged with Kintetsu in 1963. The station was elevated in 1987. In 2007, the station started using PiTaPa.

== Passenger statistics ==
In fiscal 2023, the station was used by an average of 22,040 passengers daily (boarding passengers only).

== Surrounding area ==
- Japan Ground Self-Defense Force Okubo Garrison
- Minamiuji Community Center

== See also ==
- List of railway stations in Japan
