= Terada Station (Kyoto) =

Railway station in Jōyō, Kyoto Prefecture, Japan

Terada Station 寺田駅
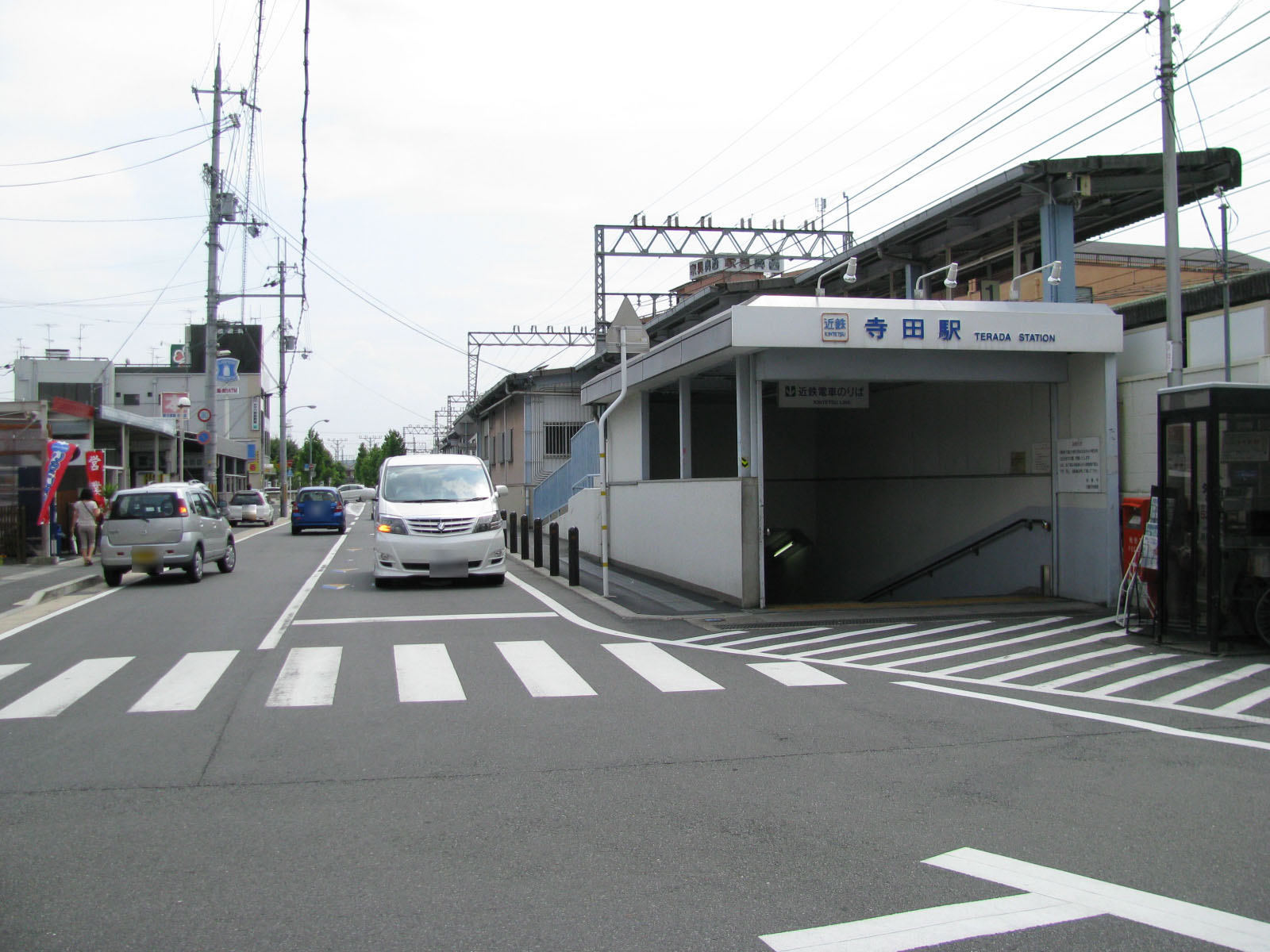
- Terada Station

General information
- Location: 41 Hijiri, Terada, Jōyō-shi, Kyoto-fu 610-0121; Japan
- Coordinates: 34°51′12.15″N 135°46′19.68″E
- System: Kintetsu Railway commuter rail station
- Owner: Kintetsu Railway
- Operator: Kintetsu Railway
- Line: Kyoto/Kashihara Line
- Distance: 15.9 km from Kyoto
- Platforms: 2 side platforms
- Connections: Bus terminal

Other information
- Station code: B14
- Website: Official website

History
- Opened: 3 November 1928

Passengers
- FY2022: 7388 daily

Services
Preceding station	Kintetsu Railway	Following station
Kutsukawa towards Kyōto	Kyoto Line Local Semi-Express	Tonoshō towards Yamato-Saidaiji
Location
- Location within Kyoto Prefecture Location within Japan

Terada Station (寺田駅, Terada-eki) is a passenger railway station located in the city of Jōyō, Kyoto, Japan, operated by the private transportation company, Kintetsu Railway. It is station number B14.

== Lines ==
Terada Station is served by the Kyoto Line, and is located 15.9 rail kilometers from the terminus of the line at Kyoto Station.

== Station layout ==
The station consists of two opposed side platforms, with ticket gates and concourses underground. The effective length of the platform is trains with a length of 6 cars.

=== Platforms ===
1	■ Kintetsu Kyoto Line	For Kashiharajingu-mae
2	■ Kintetsu Kyoto Line	For Kyoto

== History ==
Terada Station opened on 3 November 1928 as a station on the Nara Electric Railway, which merged with Kintetsu in 1963.

== Passenger statistics ==
In fiscal 2022, the station was used by an average of 7388 passengers daily.

== Surrounding area ==
- Jōyō City Hall (about 10 minutes walk)
- Jōyō Station (about 15 minutes walk)
- Jōyō City History and Folklore Museum
- Jōyō City Terada Nishi Elementary School

== See also ==
- List of railway stations in Japan
