= Kutsukawa Station =

Railway station in Jōyō, Kyoto Prefecture, Japan

Kutsukawa Station 久津川駅
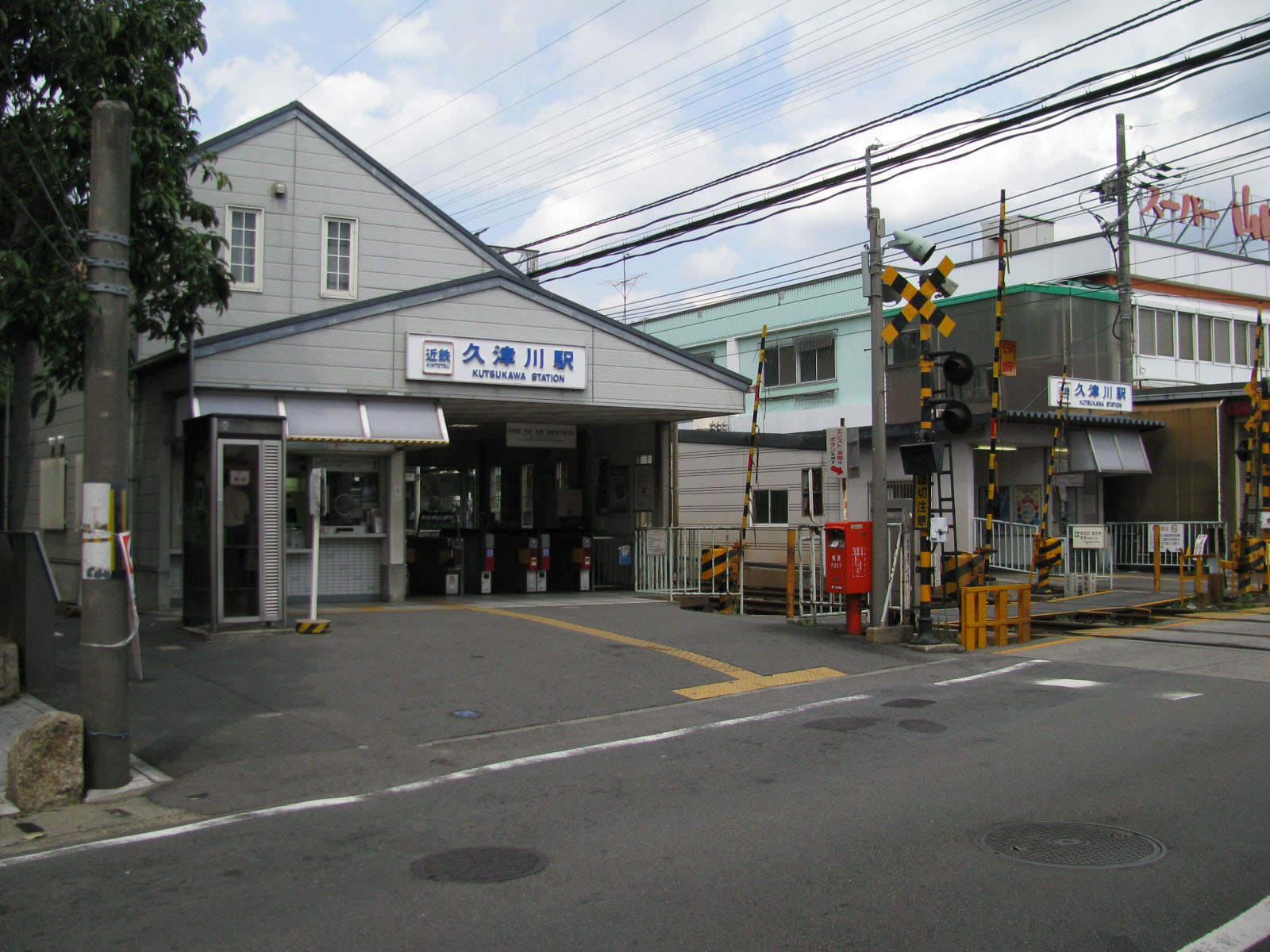
- Kutsukawa Station

General information
- Location: Hirakawa, Jōyō-shi, Kyoto-fu 610-0101; Japan
- Coordinates: 34°51′53.05″N 135°46′29.33″E
- System: Kintetsu Railway commuter rail station
- Owner: Kintetsu Railway
- Operator: Kintetsu Railway
- Line: Kyoto/Kashihara Line
- Distance: 14.6 km from Kyoto
- Platforms: 2 side platforms
- Connections: Bus terminal

Other information
- Station code: B13
- Website: Official website

History
- Opened: 3 November 1928

Passengers
- FY2022: 6322 daily

Services
| Preceding station | Kintetsu Railway | Following station |
|---|---|---|
| Ōkubo towards Kyōto | Kyoto Line Local Semi-Express | Terada towards Yamato-Saidaiji |
Location
- Location within Kyoto Prefecture Location within Japan

Kutsukawa Station (久津川駅, Kutsukawa-eki) is a passenger railway station located in the city of Jōyō, Kyoto, Japan, operated by the private transportation company, Kintetsu Railway. It is station number B13.

== Lines ==
Kutsukawa Station is served by the Kyoto Line, and is located 14.6 rail kilometers from the terminus of the line at Kyoto Station.

== Station layout ==
The station consists of two opposed side platforms. The effective length of the platform is six cars. Because there are no underground passages or overpasses connecting the platforms, there are separate ticket gates for each platform.

=== Platforms ===
| 1 | ■ Kintetsu Kyoto Line | For Kashiharajingu-mae |
| 2 | ■ Kintetsu Kyoto Line | For Kyoto |

== History ==
Kutsukawa Station opened on 3 November 1928 as a station on the Nara Electric Railway, which merged with Kintetsu in 1963.

== Passenger statistics ==
In fiscal 2022, the station was used by an average of 6322 passengers daily.

== Surrounding area ==
- Joyo City Kutsugawa Elementary School
- Kutsugawa Kurumazuka Kofun
- Hirakawa Temple Ruins

== See also ==
- List of railway stations in Japan
