= Kizu River =

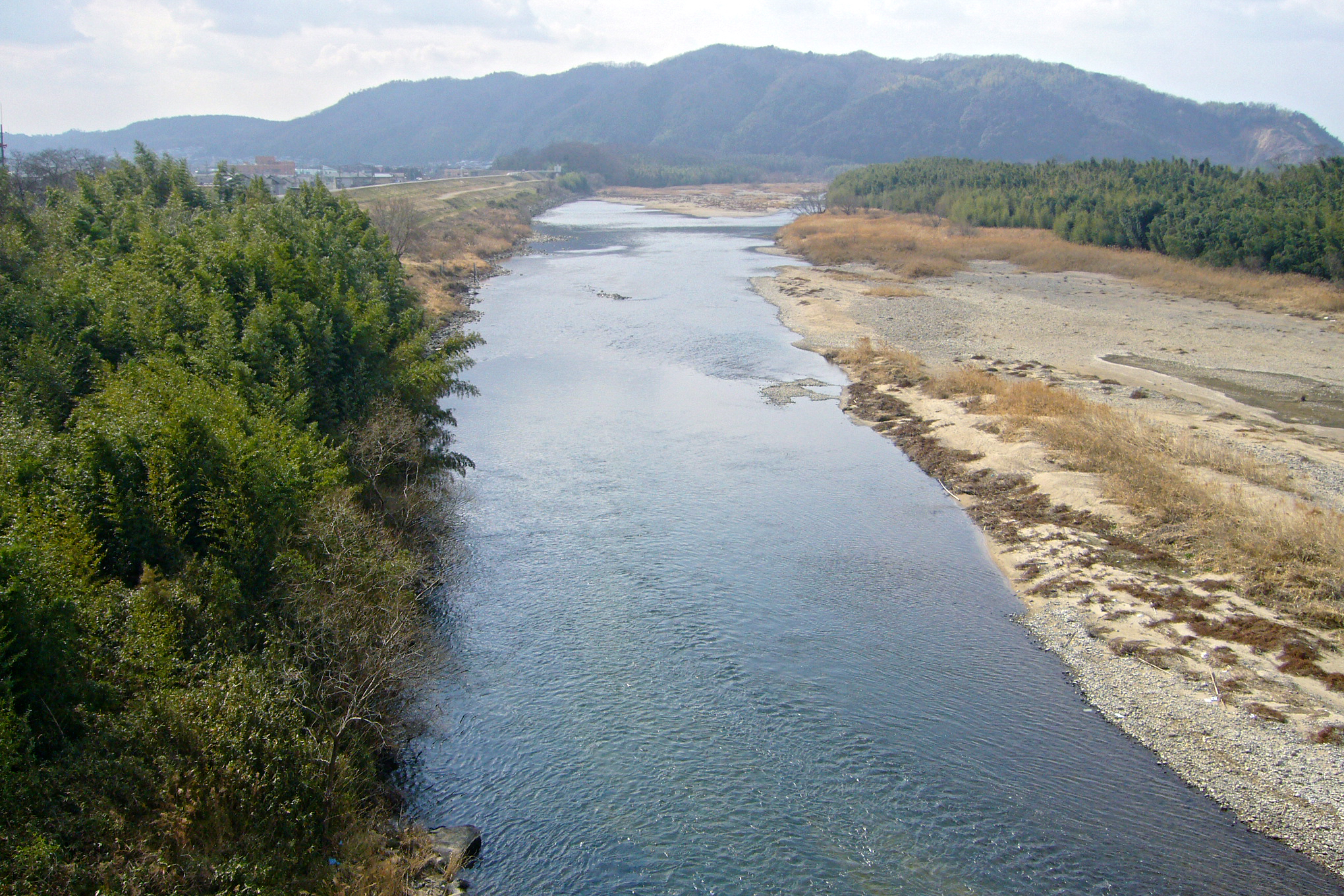
- Kizu River in Kizugawa, Japan

- Location within Japan
- Native name: 木津川 (Japanese)

Location
- Country: Japan
- Region: Kansai
- Cities and towns: Iga, Kizugawa, Kyoto, Sakata

Physical characteristics
- Source: Aoyamagōgen
  - location: Iga, Mie
  - coordinates: 34°53′6″N 135°40′54″E
- Mouth: Yodo River
  - location: Yawata, Kyoto
  - coordinates: 34°42′29″N 136°15′57″E
  - elevation: 0 m (0 ft)
- Length: 99 km (62 mi)
- Basin size: 1,596 km^{2} (616 sq mi)

Basin features
- River system: Yodo river basin

The Kizu River (木津川, Kizu-gawa) is a river that crosses the prefectures of Kyoto and Mie in Japan, a tributary of the Yodo River. The city of Kizugawa in Kyoto Prefecture is named after the river.
