= Iwakura Station (Kyoto) =

Railway station in Kyoto, Japan

Coordinates: 35°04′17″N 135°47′12″E

Iwakura Station 岩倉駅
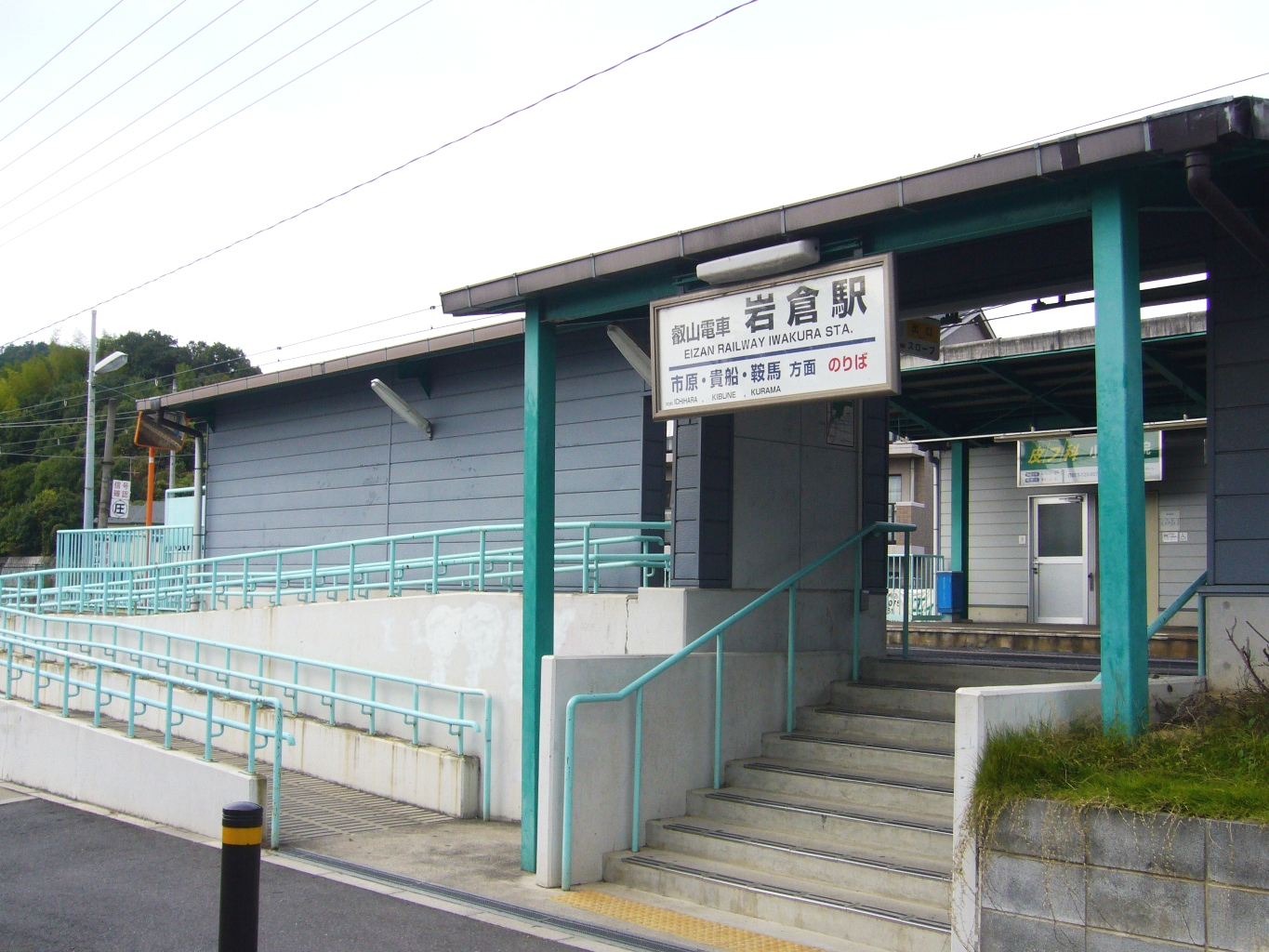

General information
- Location: Sakyō-ku, Kyoto, Kyoto Prefecture, Japan
- Line: Kurama Line
Location

Iwakura Station (岩倉駅, Iwakura-eki; station:number: E10) is a train station located on the Eizan Electric Railway (Eiden) Kurama Line in Sakyō-ku, Kyoto, Kyoto Prefecture, Japan.

== Layout ==
This station has two island platforms serving a track each. There is an entrance on each platform.

■ Kurama Line	for Takaragaike and Demachiyanagi
■ Kurama Line	for Nikenchaya and Kurama

== Surroundings ==
- Kyoto Municipal Rakuhoku Junior High School
- Iwakura River
- Doshisha Elementary School
- Kokusaikaikan Station (Kyoto Municipal Subway Karasuma Line)

== Adjacent stations ==
«	Service	»
Kurama Line (E10)
Hachiman-mae (E09)	-	Kino (E11)
