= Shijō Kawaramachi =

Part of central Kyoto, Japan

Coordinates: 35°0′13.60″N 135°46′09.40″E

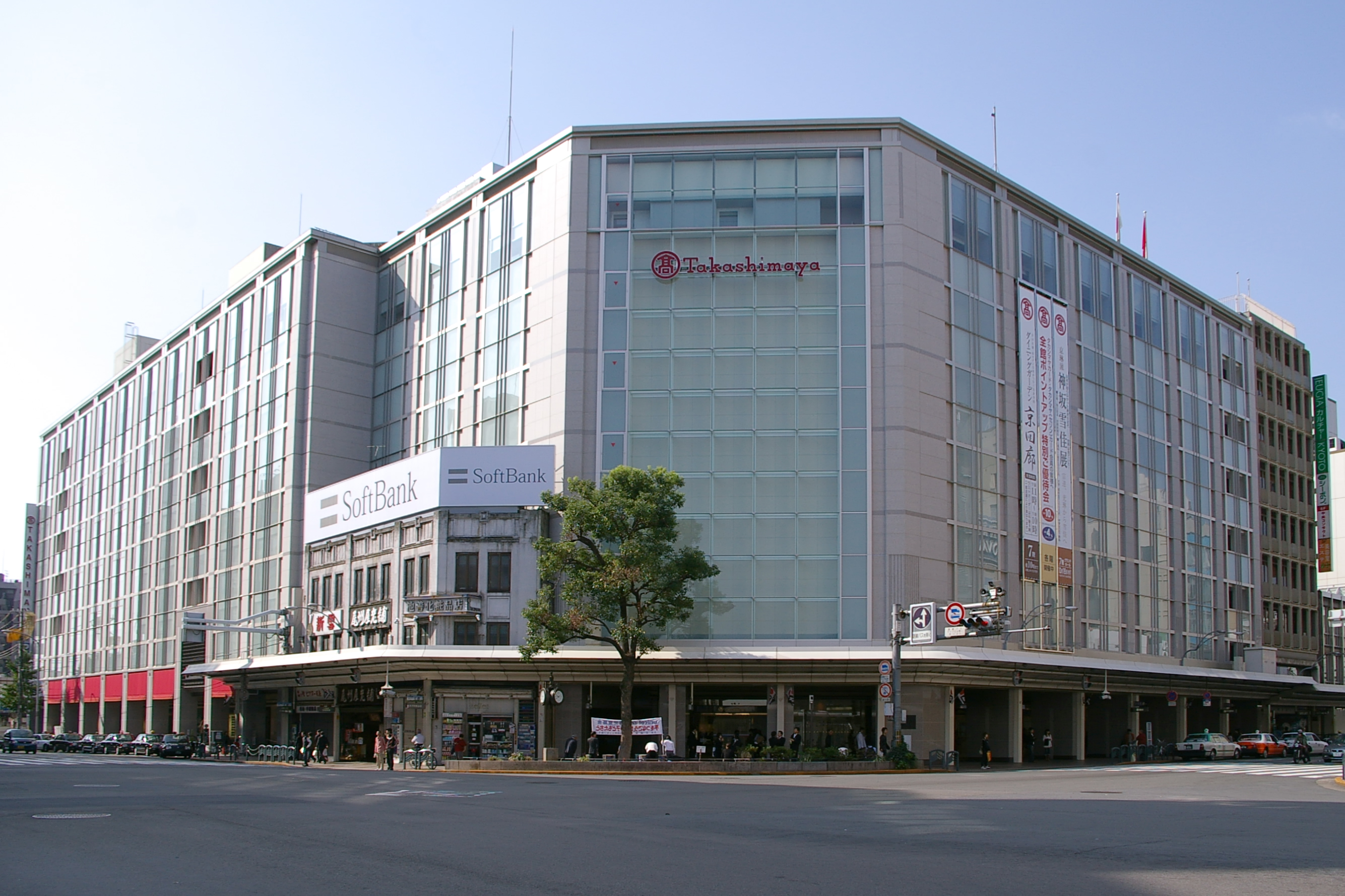
Takashimaya Department Store at southwest corner of the crossing

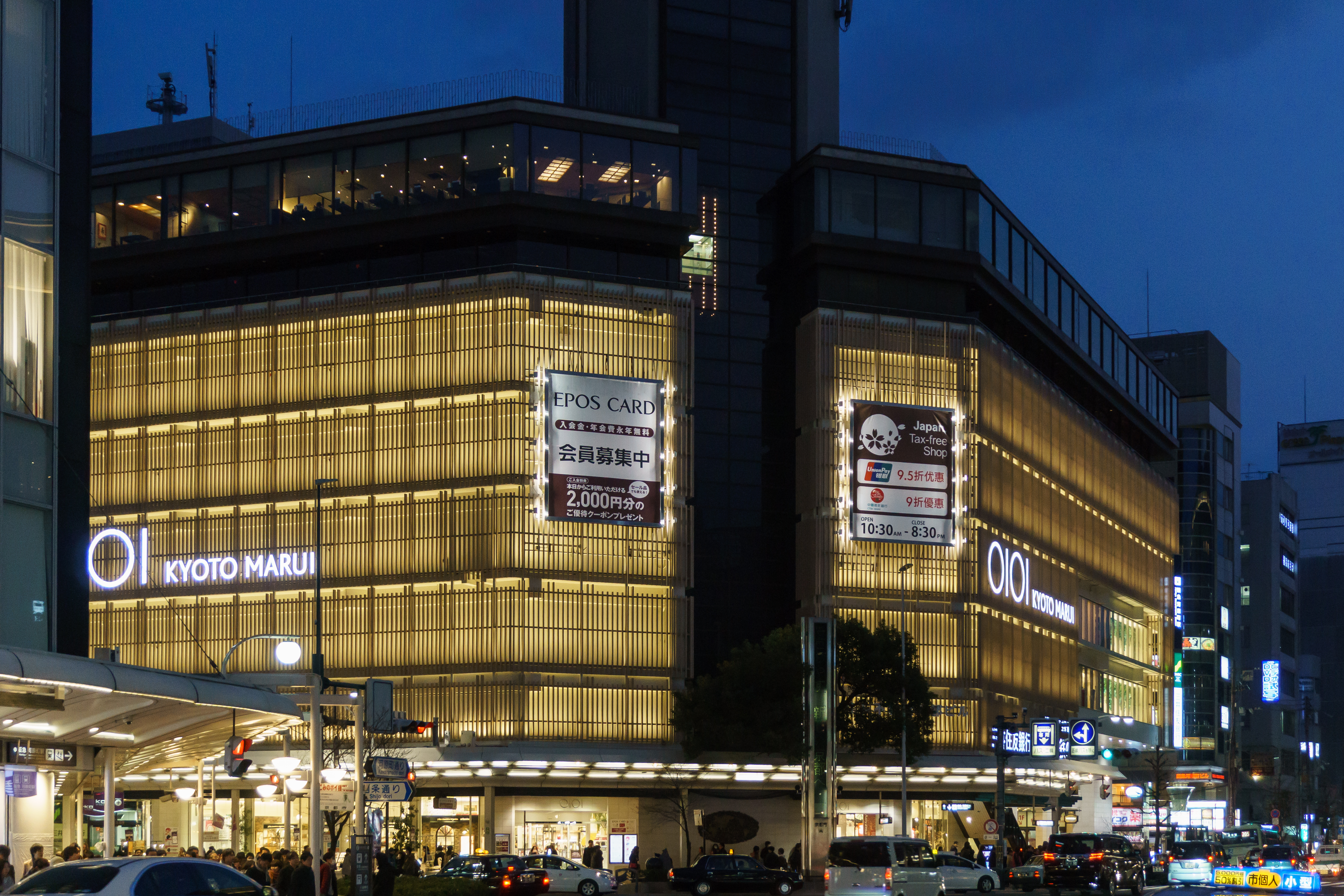
Kyoto Marui department store

Shijō Kawaramachi (四条河原町) is a part of central Kyoto, Japan where Shijō and Kawaramachi Streets intersect. Kawaramachi Street runs parallel to the Kamo River on the eastern side of Kyoto, while Shijō Street runs east–west through the center of the city.

== Stores ==
Two of four corners of the intersection are occupied by department stores: Takashimaya at the southwest corner and Kyoto Marui at the southeast corner. Kyoto Marui opened on April 27, 2011 replacing Hankyu Department Store, which closed on August 22, 2010.

== Railway station ==
Kyoto-kawaramachi Station is the terminal of the Hankyu Kyoto Line (Hankyu Railway) in Kyoto. The underground station lies beneath the Shijō Kawaramachi intersection. Passengers may change trains from Kyoto-kawaramachi Station to Gion-Shijō Station (Keihan Railway Keihan Main Line), which is located beyond the Kamo River.

The real estate around Kawaramachi station at one time ranked among the most valuable in Japan before the real estate bubble burst in the early '90s.

Currently, the station connects underground to department stores such as Takashimaya, which has an eclectic food market on its basement floor. The station also connects underground to Karasuma Station.

== Buses ==
Kyoto City Bus
Shijo Kawaramachi

- Bus stop A
  - Route 10 for Kitano Tenman-gu, Omuro and Yamagoe via Sanjo Keihan
  - Route 15 for Emmachi and Ritsumeikan University via Sanjo Keihan
  - Route 37 for Kitaoji Bus Terminal and Nishigamo Depot via Sanjo Keihan
  - Route 59 for Kinkaku-ji, Ryōan-ji and Yamagoe via Sanjo Keihan
  - Kawaramachi Night Bus for Kyoto Station via Kawaramachi Street
- Bus stop B
  - Route 11 and Route 12 for Sanjo Keihan
- Bus stop C
  - Route 4, Route 17 and Kawaramachi Night Bus for Kyoto Station via Kawaramachi Street
  - Shijo-Kawaramachi Shopping Liner for Kyoto Station
  - Route 80 for Uzumasa Tenjingawa via Gojo Street
  - Route 205 for Kyoto Station and Kujo Depot via Kawaramachi Street
- Bus stop D
  - Shijo-Kawaramachi Shopping Liner for Kyoto City Hall and Sanjo Keihan
- Bus stop E
  - Route 12 for Kinkaku-ji and Ritsumeikan University
  - Route 31 for Shijo-Karasuma
  - Route 32 for Nishikyogoku and Kyoto University of Foreign Studies
  - Route 46 for Bukkyo University and Kamigamo Shrine via Sembon Street
  - Route 51 for Kitano Tenman-gu and Ritsumeikan University
  - Route 201 for Mibu and Sembon Imadegawa
  - Route 207 for Kyoto Aquarium, Kujo Omiya and Kujo Depot
- Bus stop F
  - Route 3 for Kyoto University of Foreign Studies and Matsuobashi
  - Route 5 and Gion Night Bus for Kyoto Station via Karasuma Street
  - Route 11 for Arashiyama, Saga and Yamagoe
  - Route 203 for Nishioji Shijo and Kitano Hakubaicho
- Bus stop G
  - Route 31 for Takano and Iwakura via Higashiyama Street
  - Route 46 for Gion and Heian Shrine
  - Route 201 for Gion and Hyakuman-ben
  - Route 203 for Gion and Kinrin Depot
  - Route 207 for Gion and Kujo Depot
  - 100 yen Bus
- Bus stop H
  - Route 4 for Midorogaike and Kamigamo Shrine
  - Route 205 for Shimogamo Shrine, Rakuhoku High School and Kitaoji Bus Terminal
- Bus stop I
  - Route 3 for Demachiyanagi, Hyakuman-ben and Kitashirakawa Shibusecho (Kamihatecho Kyoto Zokei University)
  - Route 17 for Demachiyanagi, Hyakuman-ben, Ginkaku-ji and Kinrin Depot via Kawaramachi Street
- Bus stop J
  - Route 5 for Osakzaki Park, Kyoto Municipal Museum of Art, the National Museum of Modern Art, Kyoto, Heian Shrine, Nanzen-ji, Eikando, Ginkaku-ji, Kamihatecho Kyoto Zokei University, Shugakuin and Iwakura
  - Route 32 for Osakzaki Park, Kyoto Municipal Museum of Art, the National Museum of Modern Art, Kyoto, Heian Shrine and Ginkaku-ji
  - 100 yen Bus for Kyoto City Hall

Kyoto Bus
Timetable

- Shijo Street (eastbound, for Takano and Ohara)
  - Route 17 for Ohara via Sanjo Keihan, Demachiyanagi, Takanobashi, Shugakuin, Hanazonobashi and Yase-ekimae
  - for Takano Depot via Kawaramachi Sanjo, Demachiyanagi and Takanobashi
- Kawaramachi Street (northbound, for Takano and Ohara)
  - Route 16 starting for Ohara
  - Route 17 for Ohara
  - for Takano Depot
- Kawaramachi Street (southbound, for Iwakura, Arashiyama and Kyoto Station)
  - Route 17 for Kyoto Station
  - Route 21 for Iwakura Jisso-in via Sanjo Keihan, Kawabata Street, Demachiyanagi, Takanobashi, Hanazonobashi and Iwakura
  - Route 23 for Iwakura Jisso-in via Sanjo Keihan, Kawaramachi Street, Demachiyanagi, Takanobashi, Hanazonobashi and Iwakura
  - Route 41 for Iwakura Muramatsu via Sanjo Keihan, Kawabata Street, Demachiyanagi, Takanobashi, Hanazonobashi and Iwakura
  - Route 43 for Iwakura Muramatsu via Sanjo Keihan, Kawaramachi Street, Demachiyanagi, Takanobashi, Hanazonobashi and Iwakura
  - Route 61 for Daikaku-ji via Nijo, Emmachi and Kyoto Studio Park and Hankyu Arashiyama
  - Route 62 for Kiyotaki via Nijo, Emmachi, Kyoto Studio Park and Hankyu Arashiyama
  - Route 64 for Kiyotaki via Nijo, Emmachi, Kyoto Studio Park, Hankyu Arashiyama and Daikaku-ji
  - Route 63 for Koke-dera Suzumushi-dera via Nijo, Emmachi, Kyoto Studio Park and Hankyu Arashiyama
  - Route 65 for Arisugawa via Nijo, Emmachi and Kyoto Studio Park

Keihan Bus
Timetable

for Oyake
for Daigo Bus Terminal
for Yamashina
Daigo Rapid for Daigo-ji
for Rokujizō
for Sanjo Keihan
for Shijo Karasuma and Shijo Omiya
