= Takaragaike Station =

Railway station in Kyoto, Japan

Coordinates: 35.058157°N 135.792341°E

Takaragaike Station (宝ヶ池駅, Takaragaike-eki; station number: E06) is a train station in Sakyō-ku, Kyoto, Kyoto Prefecture, Japan.

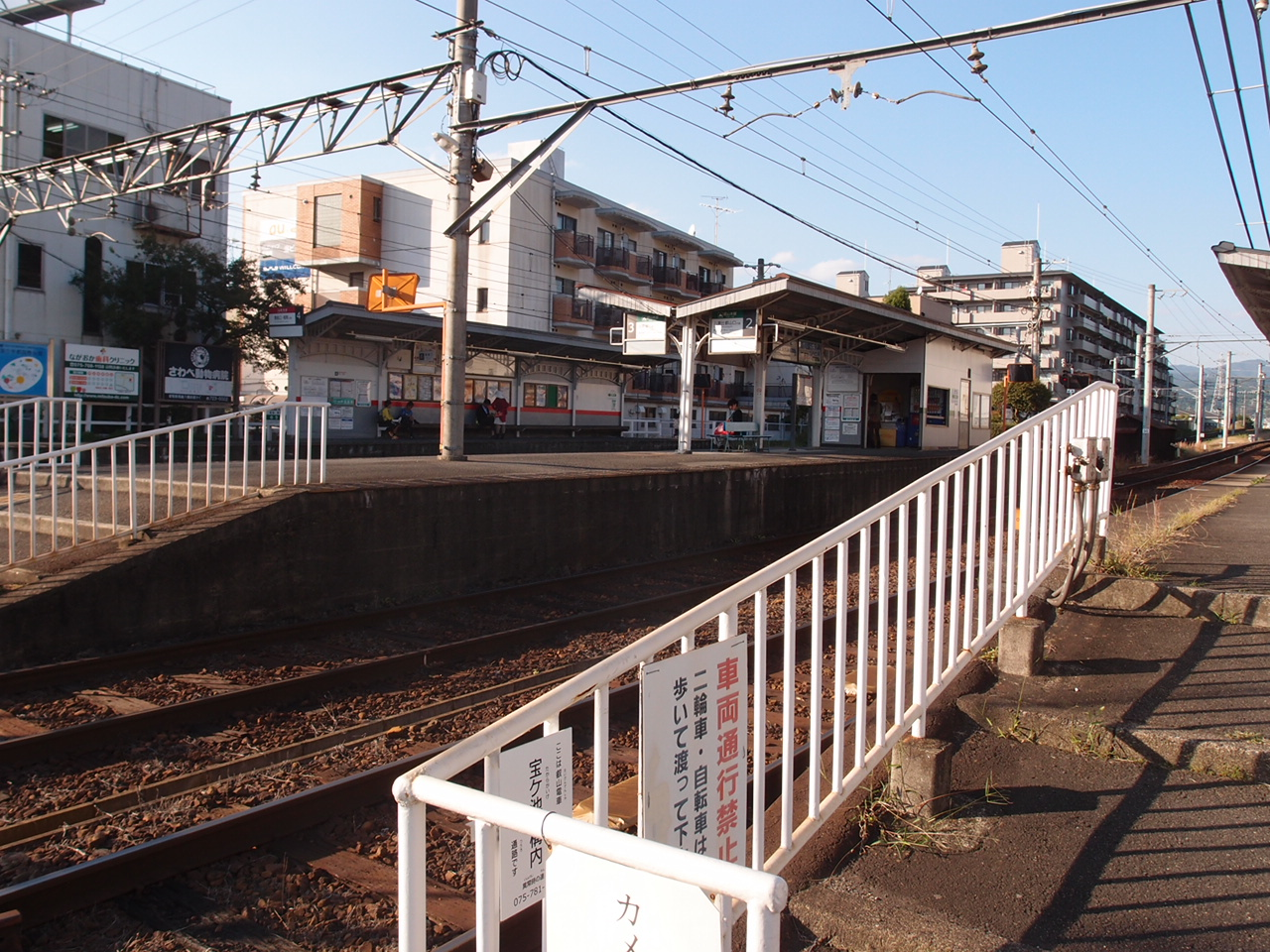

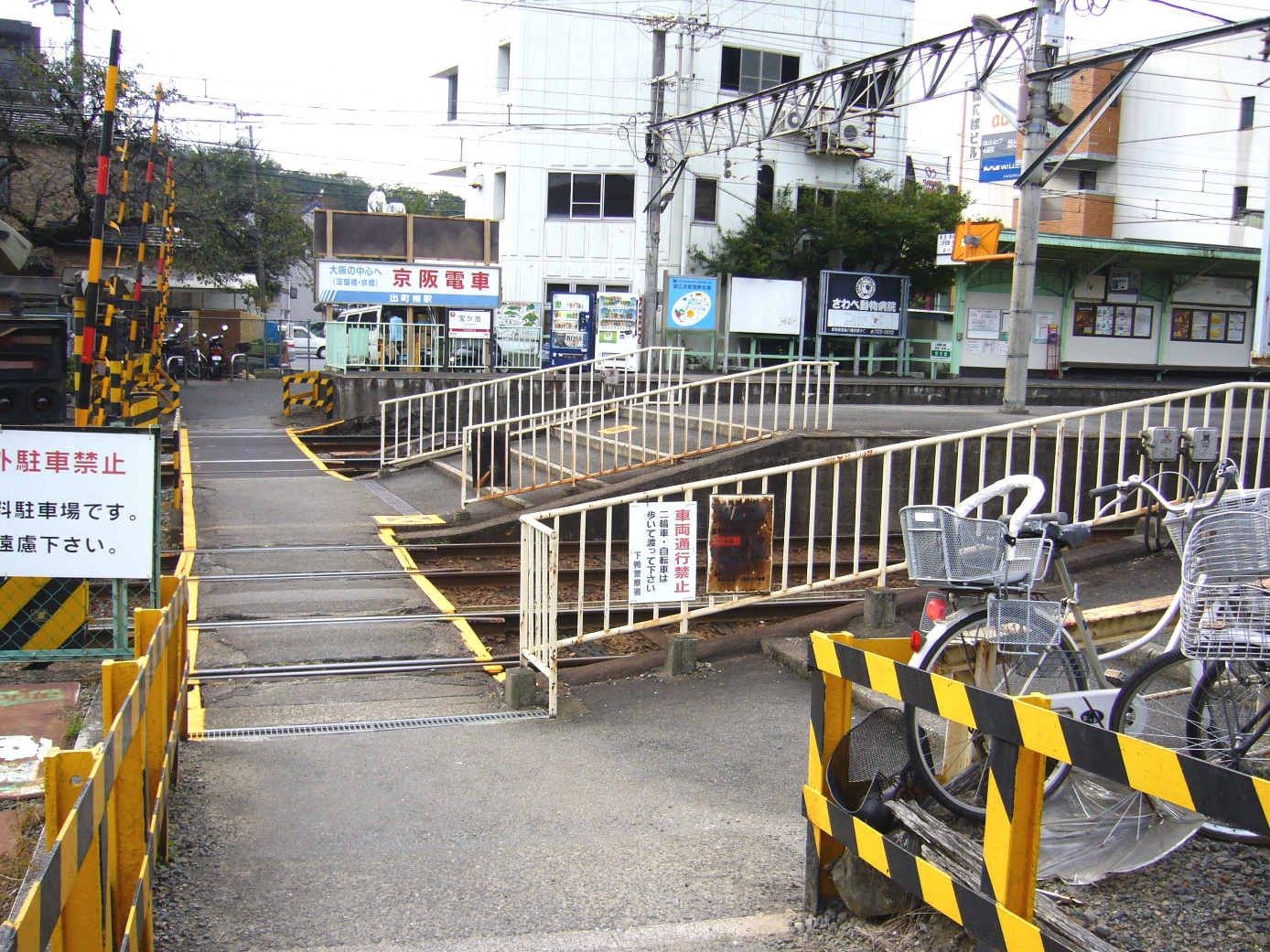

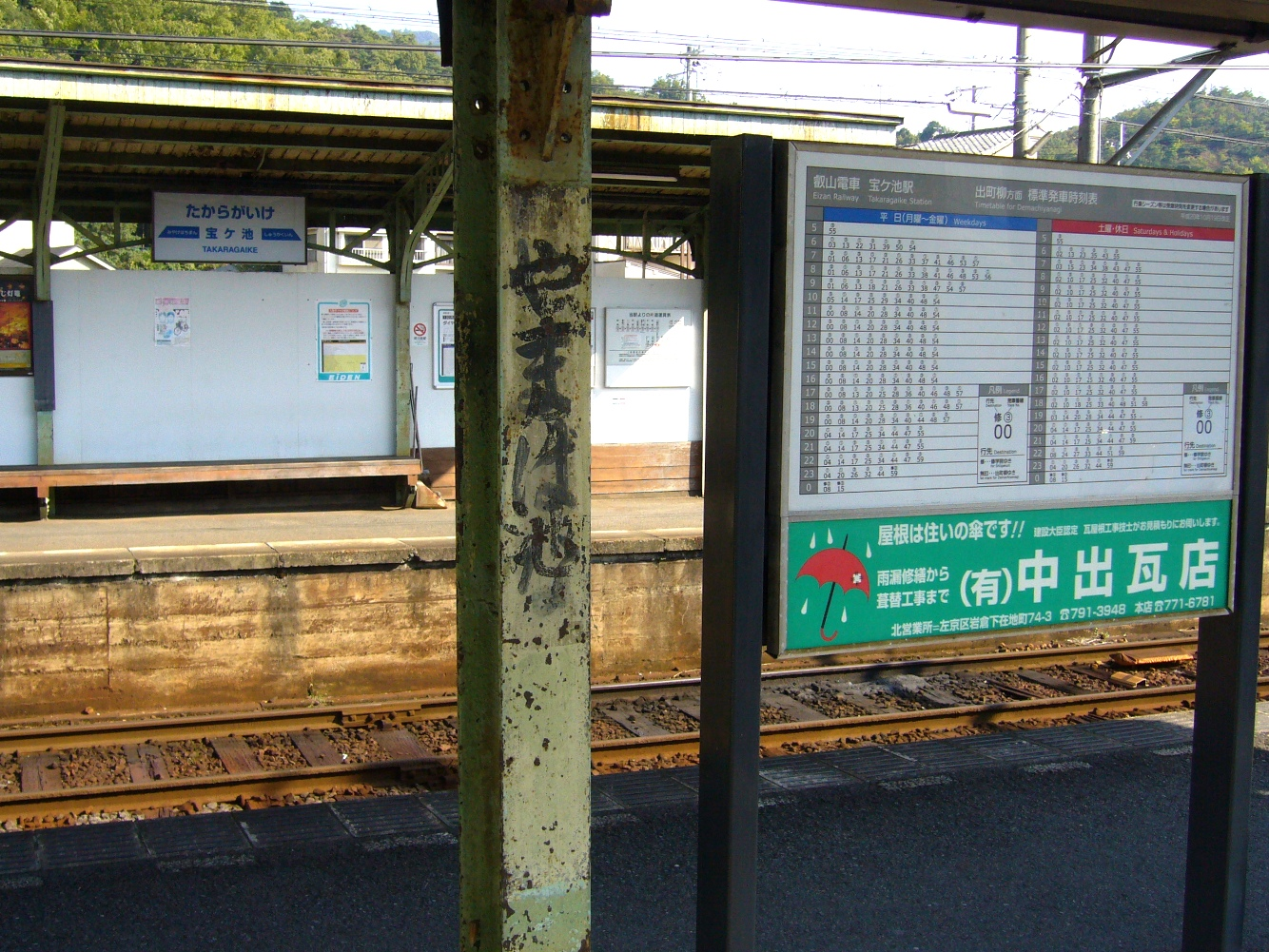

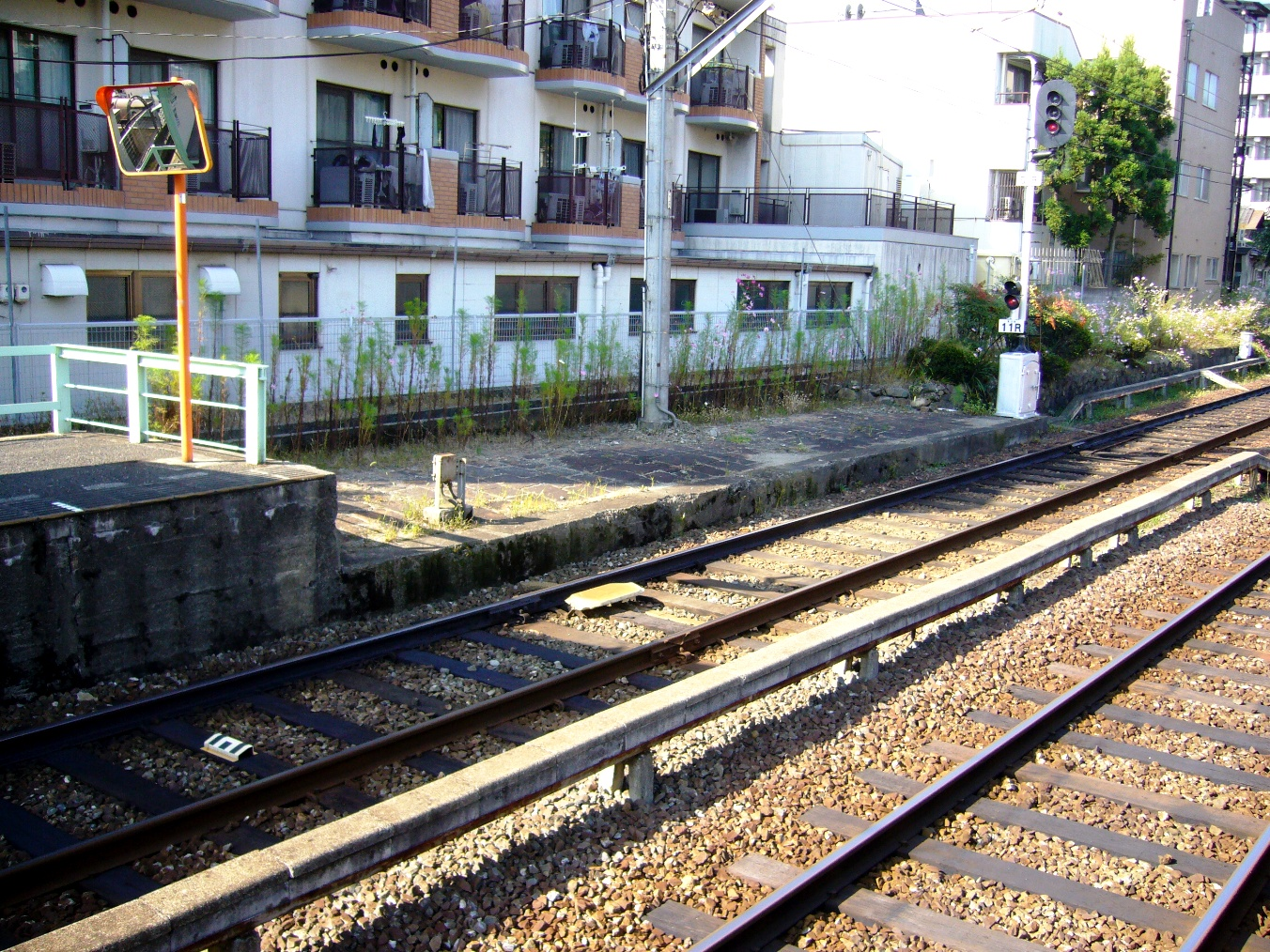

== Lines ==
- Eizan Electric Railway (Eiden)
  - Eizan Main Line
  - Kurama Line

== Layout ==
- The station has an island platform serving 2 tracks between 2 side platforms serving a track each.

1	■ Eizan Main Line	from Yase-Hieizanguchi for Shūgakuin and Demachiyanagi
2	■ Eizan Main Line	for Yase-Hieizanguchi
3	■ Eizan Main Line	from Kurama and Nikenchaya for Shūgakuin and Demachiyanagi
4	■ Kurama Line	for Nikenchaya and Kurama

== Adjacent stations ==
Preceding station	Eizan Electric Railway	Following station
Shūgakuin E05 towards Demachiyanagi	Eizan Main Line	Miyake-Hachiman E07 towards Yase-Hieizanguchi
through to Eizan Main Line	Kurama Line	Hachiman-mae E09 towards Kurama

== See also ==
- List of railway stations in Japan
