= Shūgakuin Station =

Railway station in Kyoto, Japan

Shūgakuin Station 修学院駅
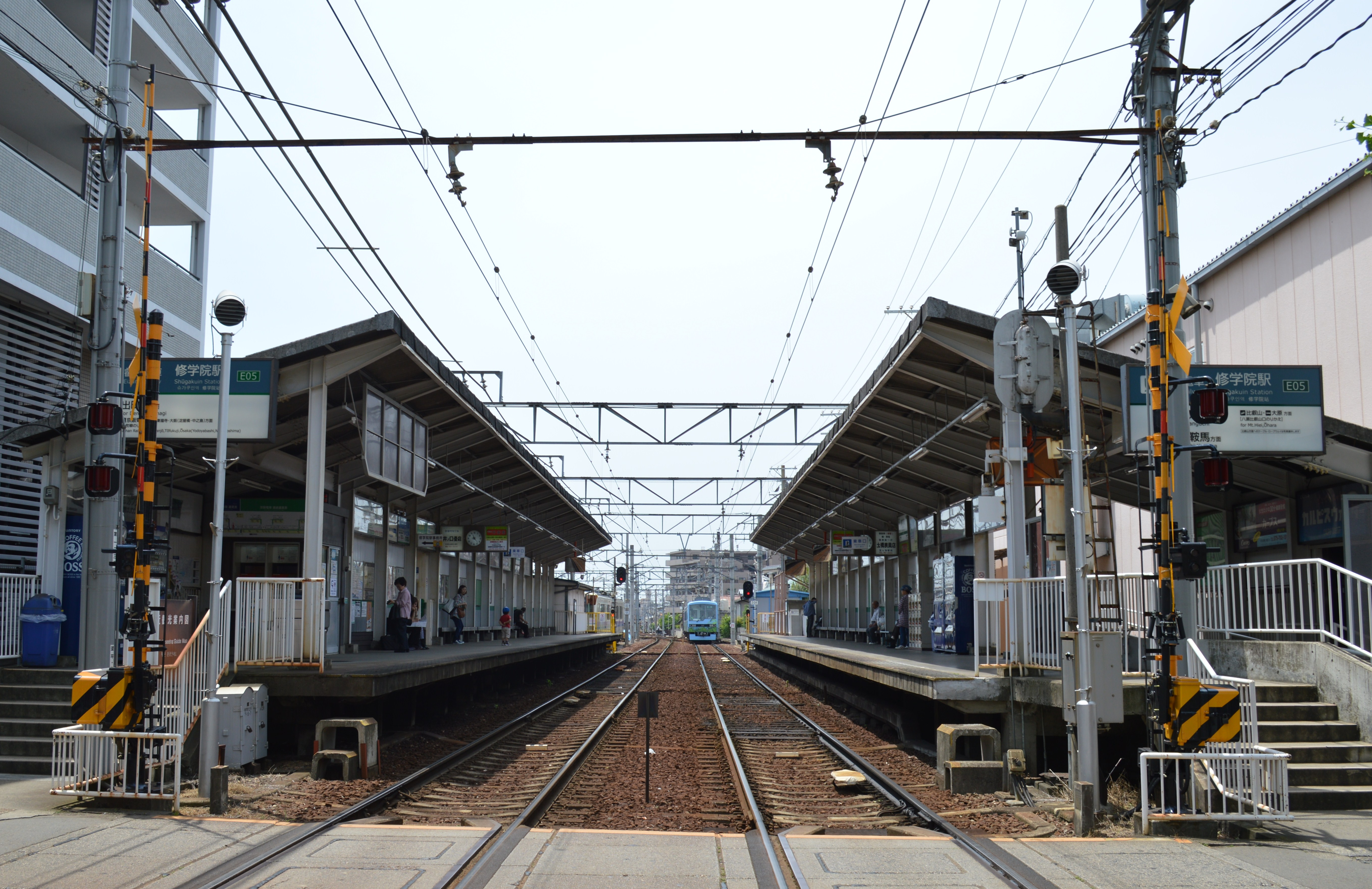

General information
- Location: Yamabana-Itchodacho, Sakyo, Kyoto, Kyoto （京都市左京区山端壱町田町） Japan
- Coordinates: 35°3′0.81″N 135°47′25.65″E
- Operator: Eizan Electric Railway Co., Ltd.
- Line: Eizan Main Line

Other information
- Station code: E05

History
- Opened: 1925

Passengers
- 2012: 812,000

Services
Preceding station	Eizan Electric Railway	Following station
Ichijōji E04 towards Demachiyanagi	Eizan Main Line	Takaragaike E06 towards Yase-Hieizanguchi
Location

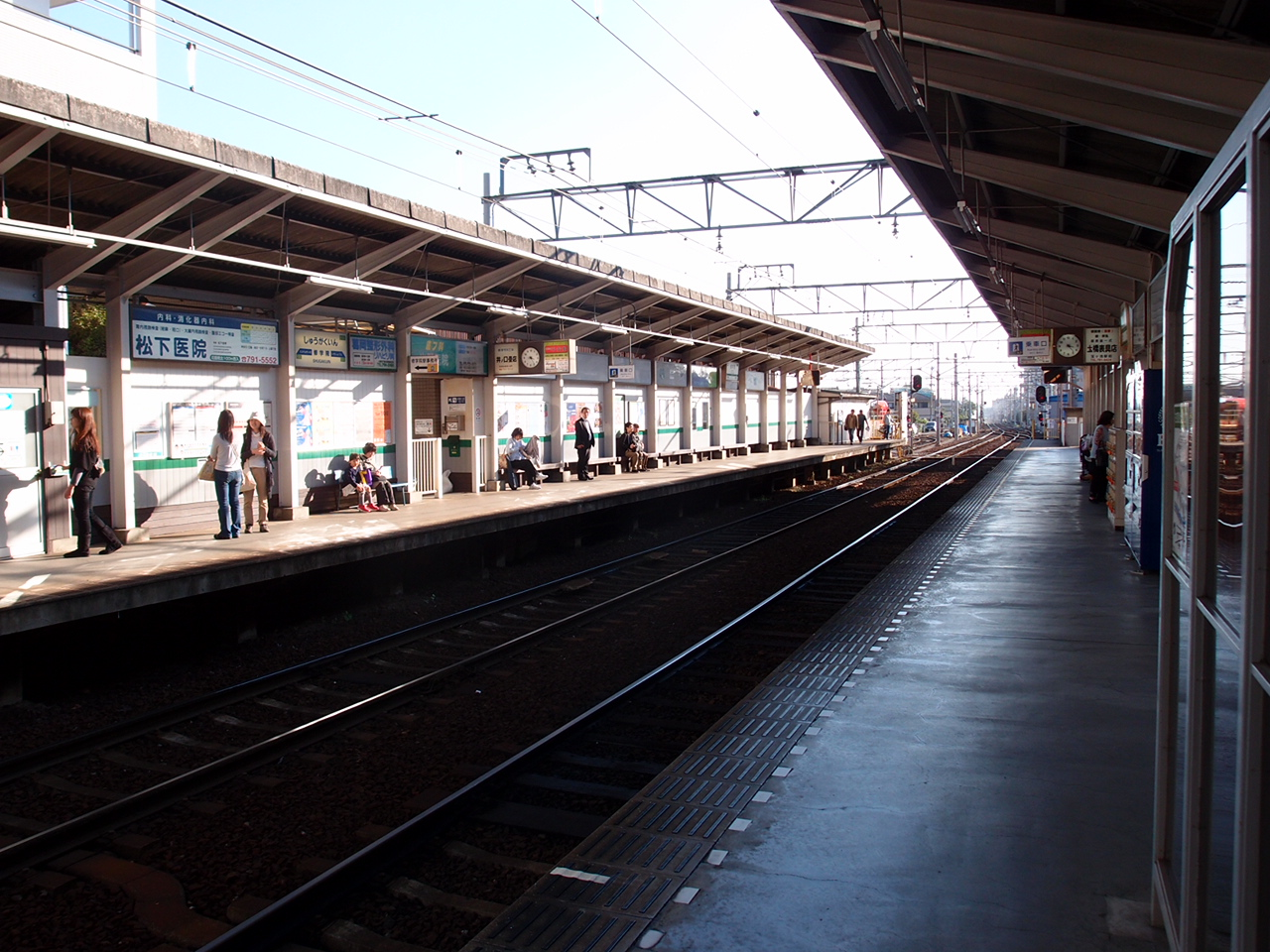
Platform

Shūgakuin Station (修学院駅, Shūgakuin-eki; station number: E05) is a train station located on the Eizan Electric Railway (Eiden) Eizan Main Line in Yamabana-Itchodacho, Sakyō-ku, Kyoto, Kyoto Prefecture, Japan.

== Layout ==
The station is located along Kitayama-dōri and the northern end of Higashiōji-dōri. The station has 2 side platforms on the ground along the tracks. There is Shūgakuin Depot at the back of the building in the south-east of the station.

east side	■ Eizan Main Line	for Ichijōji and Demachiyanagi; Change trains at Demachiyanagi for the Keihan Line (for Sanjo, Hirakatashi and Osaka)
west side	■ Eizan Main Line	for Yase-Hieizanguchi and Kurama

== Surroundings ==
- Shugakuin Imperial Villa
- Manshu-in
- Sekizan Zen-in
- Plaza Shūgakuin
- Saginomori Shrine
- Myōen-ji (Matsugasaki Daikokuten)
- Kirarazaka
- Matsugasaki Bridge (over the Takano River)
- Gozan no Okuribi (Myō/Hō)
- 7-Eleven Kyoto Shūgakuin Ekimae
- Shūgakuin Depot
