= Miyakehachiman Station =

Railway station in Kyoto, Japan

Coordinates: 35.0622°N 135.7964°E

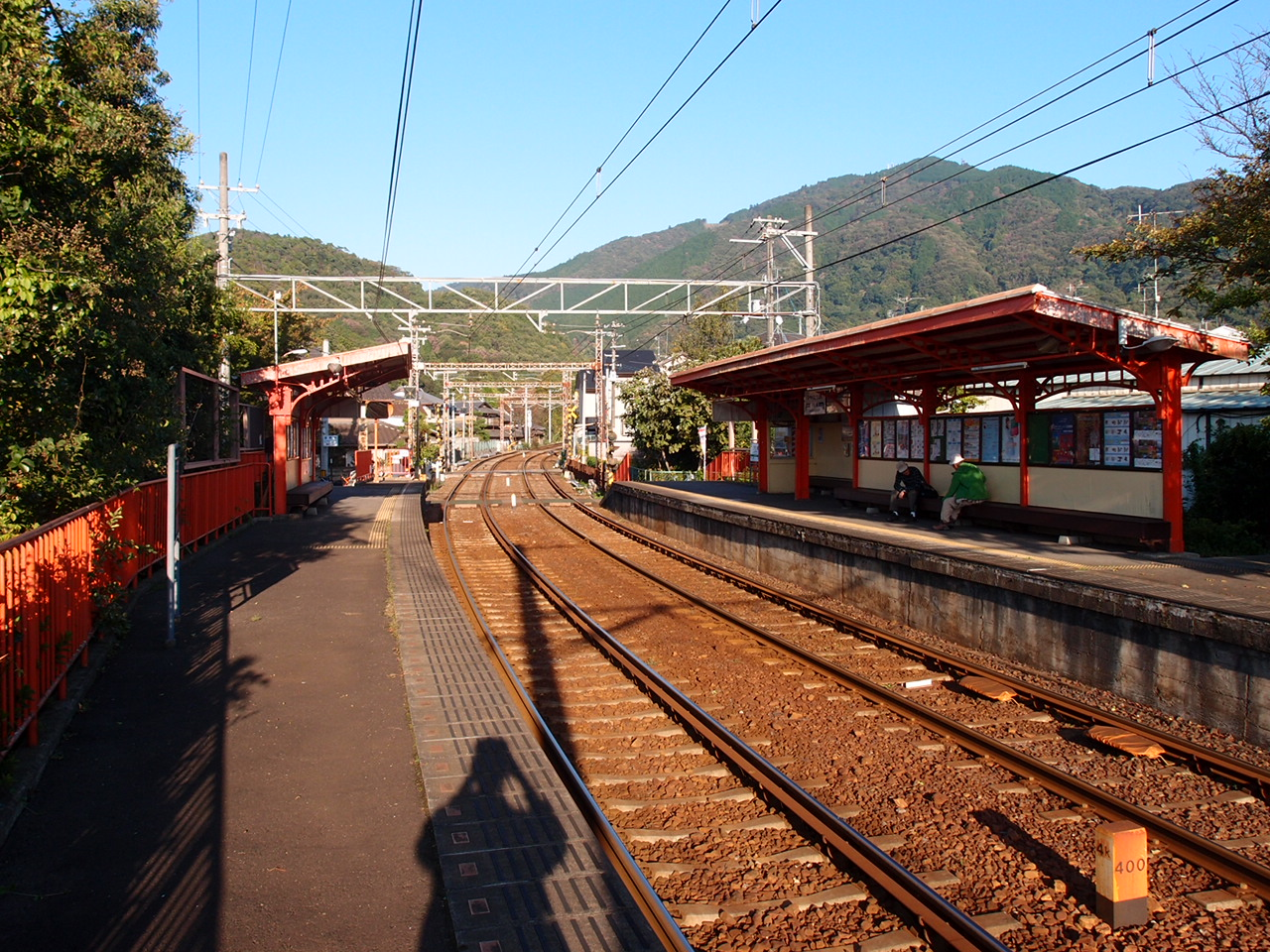
Platforms

Miyakehachiman Station (三宅八幡駅, Miyakehachiman-eki) is a train station located in Sakyō-ku, Kyoto, Kyoto Prefecture, Japan.

== Lines ==
- Eizan Electric Railway (Eiden)
  - Eizan Main Line

== Layout ==
The station has two side platforms serving two tracks.

== Adjacent stations ==
Preceding station	Eizan Electric Railway	Following station
Takaragaike towards Demachiyanagi	Eizan Main Line	Yase-Hieizanguchi Terminus
