= Kibuneguchi Station =

Railway station in Kyoto, Japan

Coordinates: 35.1059°N 135.7639°E

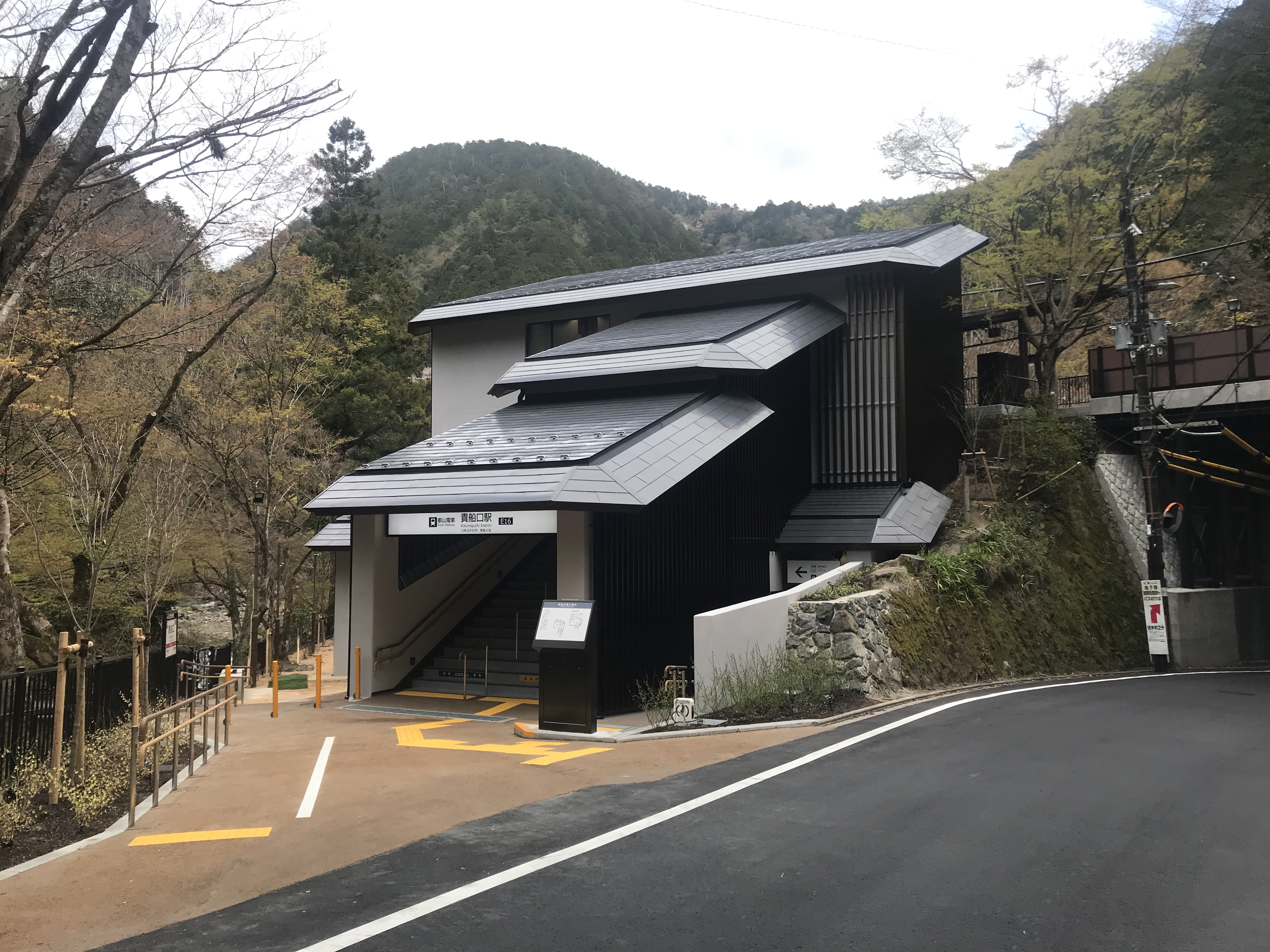
Station building

Kibuneguchi Station (貴船口駅, Kibuneguchi-eki) is a train station located in Sakyō-ku, Kyoto, Kyoto Prefecture, Japan.

== Lines ==
- Eizan Electric Railway (Eiden)
  - Kurama Line

== Adjacent stations ==
«	Service	»
Kurama Line
Ninose	-	Kurama
