= Kurama-dera Cable =

Cable railway in Mount Kurama, Japan

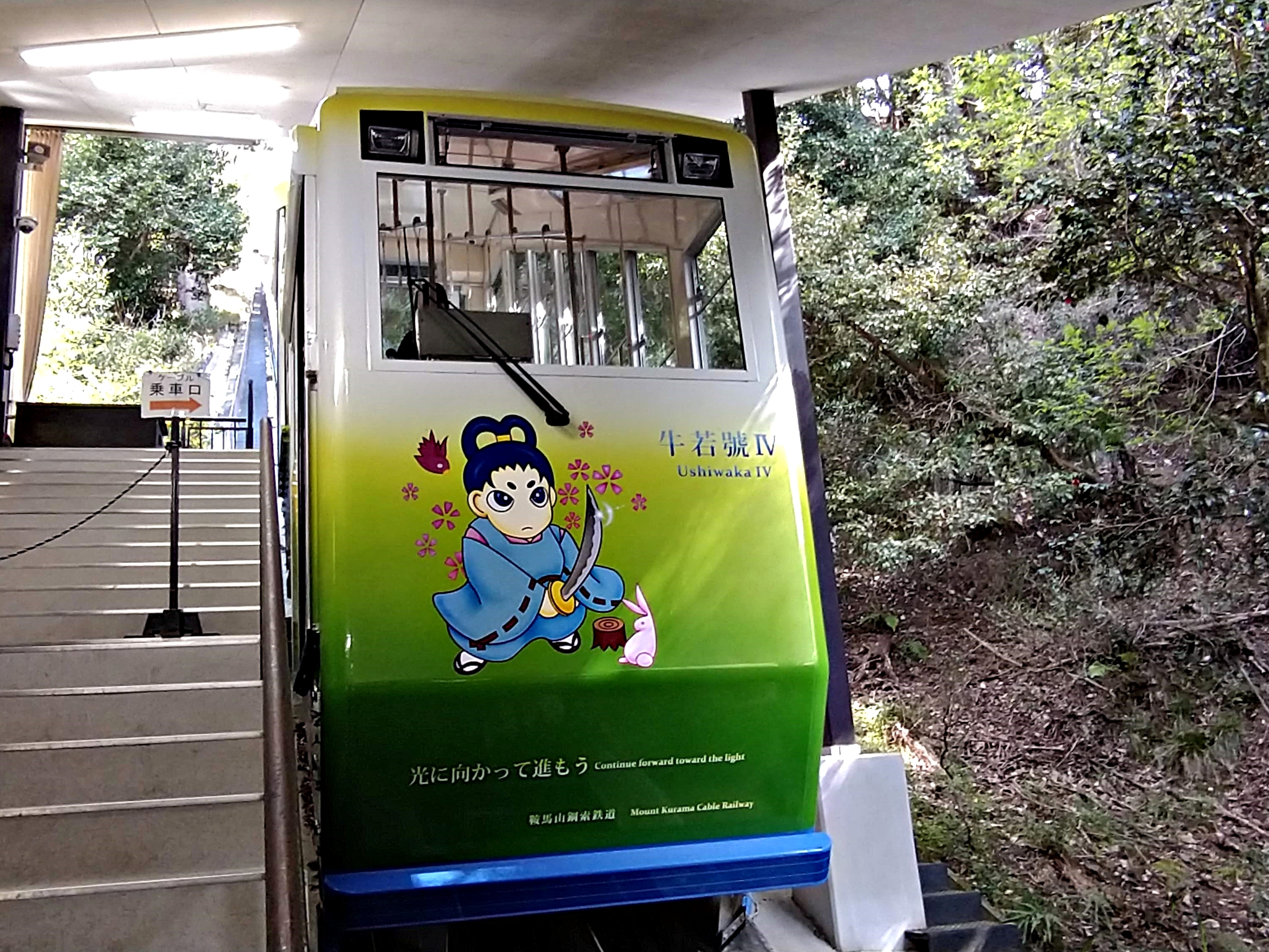
- The funicular in April 2024

Overview
- Native name: 鞍馬寺鞍馬山鋼索鉄道
- Status: Operational
- Termini: Sammon; Tahoto
- Connecting lines: Eizan Electric Railway (Kurama Station)
- Stations: 2

Service
- System: Funicular railway
- Operator(s): Kurama-dera

Technical
- Line length: 0.2 km (0.12 mi)

The Kurama-dera Cable (鞍馬寺ケーブル, Kurama-dera Kēburu) is a funicular line operated by Kurama-dera, a famous Buddhist temple in Mount Kurama, Sakyō, Kyoto, Japan. The line is officially called Mount Kurama Cable Railway (鞍馬山鋼索鉄道, Kurama-yama Kōsaku Tetsudō).

== Description ==
The funicular line serves for the visitors to the Kurama-dera temple. As the temple resides in the heart of the Mount Kurama, it takes roughly 30 minutes on foot from the main gate while the funicular line links the same route in just 2 minutes. The temple recommends its visitors not to use the funicular, but to walk on foot if possible to feel stronger impressions.

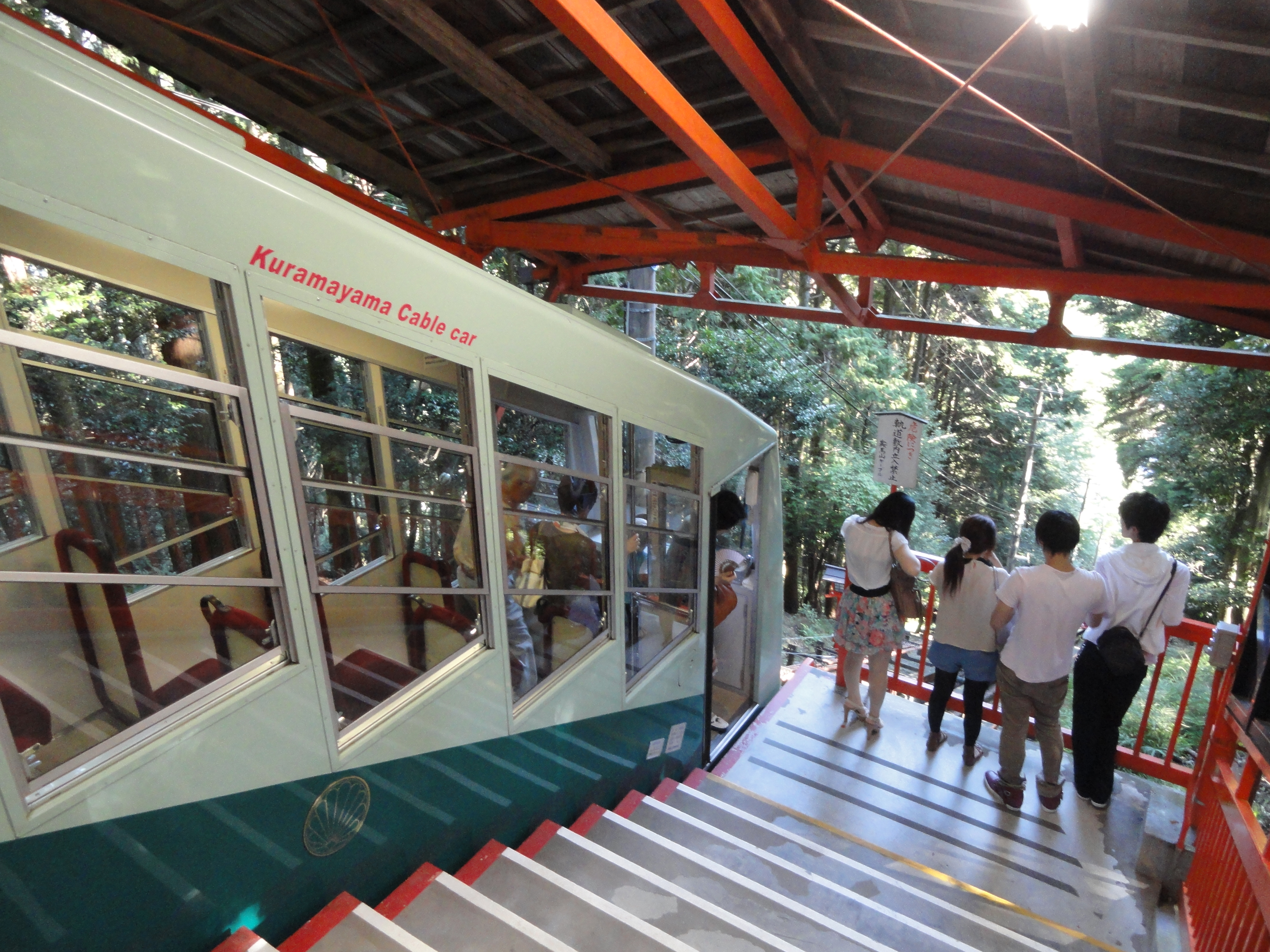
The cable car at Kurama-dera.

line, this is the only one operated by a Japanese religious institution. This is also the shortest line in the country, with a length of 207 meters. The line was initially free to ride, with usage limited to believers of the temple's religion. The temple began requesting donations as a form of fare for the funicular when the line was made available to the public. The line has only single car, counterbalanced by a weight.

== History ==
The line opened on January 1, 1957, as an ordinary iron-wheeled funicular with two cars, 762 mm (2 ft 6 in) gauge. The line was nearly abandoned in 1974, when deterioration of infrastructure was found during routine checkups. It later resumed operations in January 1976 as the current rubber-tired system with 800 mm (2 ft 7 1/2 in) gauge. The line was severely damaged by the Typhoon Jebi in 2018, with about 180 fallen trees blocking the funicular after the typhoon has passed. The line resumed operations after 50 days.

== See also ==
- Funicular railway
- List of funicular railways
- List of railway lines in Japan
