= Ichihara Station =

Railway station in Kyoto, Japan

Coordinates: 35.0884°N 135.7629°E

Ichihara Station 市原駅
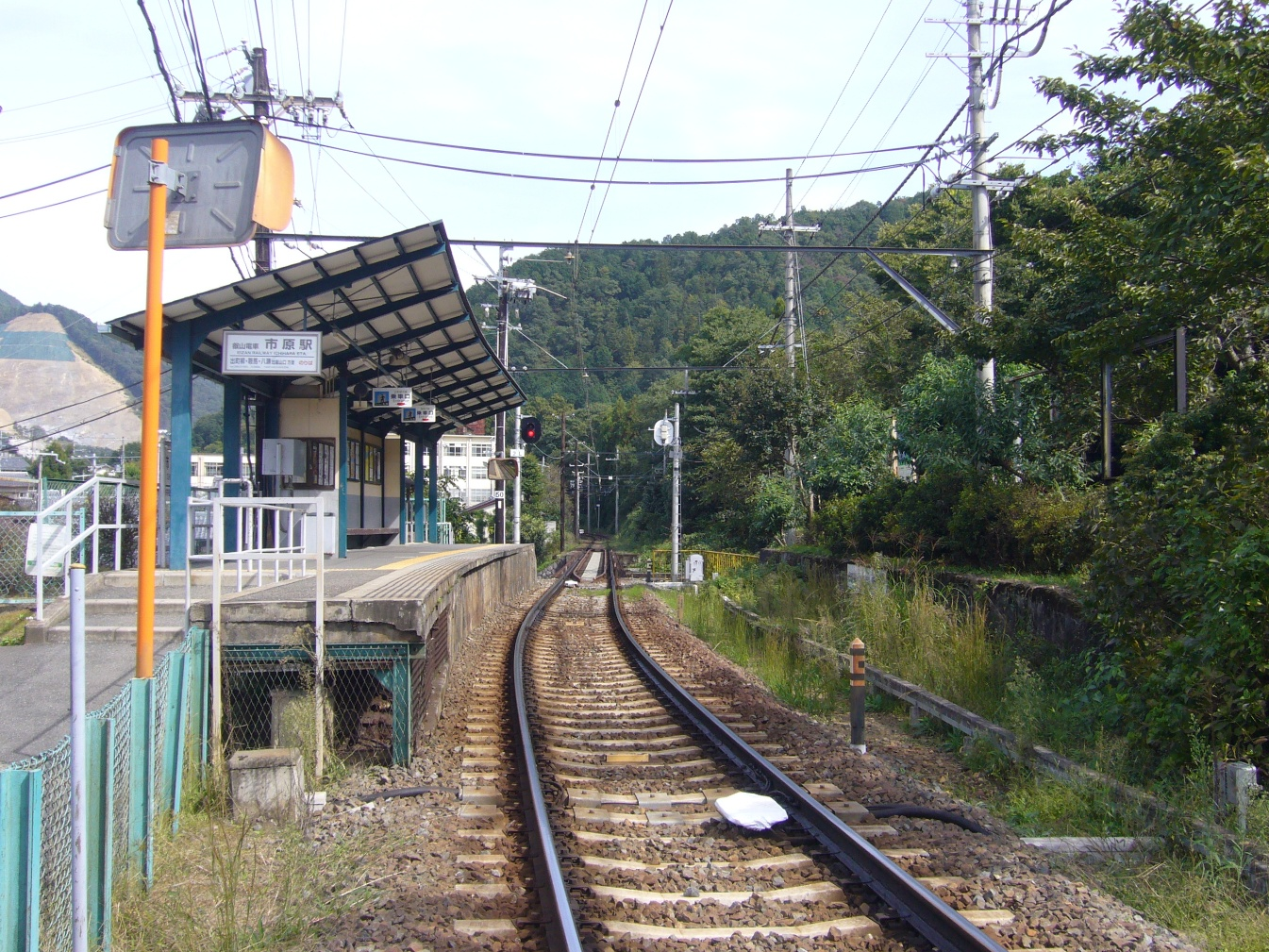

General information
- Location: Sakyō-ku, Kyoto, Kyoto Prefecture, Japan
- Operator: Eizan Electric Railway
- Line: Kurama Line
Location

Ichihara Station (市原駅, Ichihara-eki) is a train station located in Sakyō-ku, Kyoto, Kyoto Prefecture, Japan.

== Lines ==
- Eizan Electric Railway (Eiden)
  - Kurama Line

== Layout ==
The station has one platform serving one track.

== Adjacent stations ==
«	Service	»
Kurama Line
Nikenchaya	-	Ninose
