= Ichijōji Station =

Railway station in Kyoto, Japan

Ichijoji Station 一乗寺駅
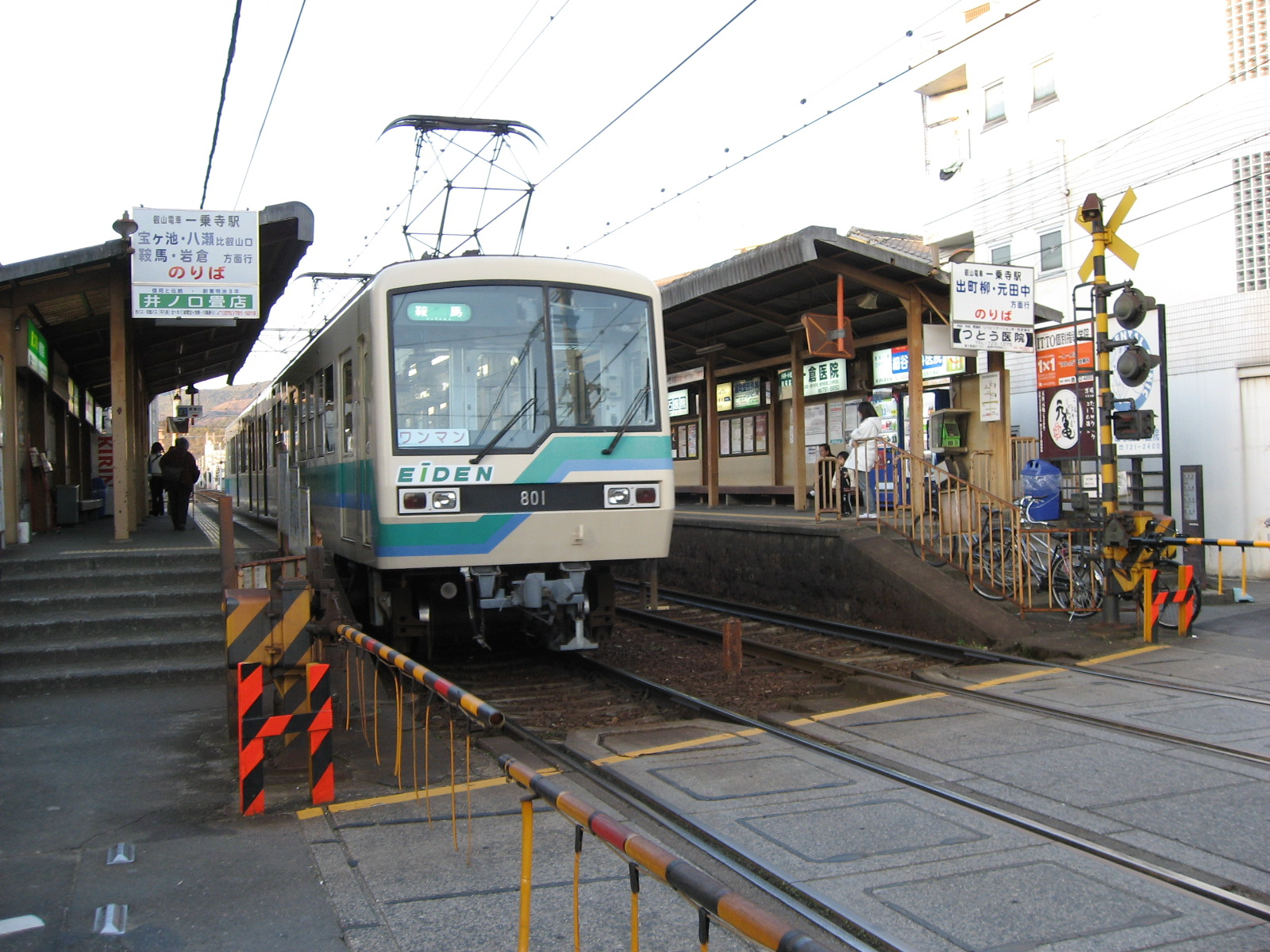
- Ichijōji Station, March 2007

General information
- Location: Sakyō, Kyoto, Kyoto; Japan
- Coordinates: 35.0442°N 135.7875°E
- Operator: Eizan Electric Railway
- Line: Eizan Main Line

Passengers
- 2012: 461,000
Location

Ichijōji Station (一乗寺駅, Ichijōji-eki) is a train station located in Sakyō-ku ward, city of Kyoto, Kyoto Prefecture, Japan.

== Lines ==
- Eizan Electric Railway (Eiden)
  - Eizan Main Line

== Adjacent stations ==
«	Service	»
Eizan Main Line (E04)
Kurama Line (E04)
Chayama·Kyōto-Geijutsudaigaku	-	Shūgakuin
