= Mototanaka Station =

Railway station in Kyoto, Japan

Coordinates: 35.0348°N 135.7816°E

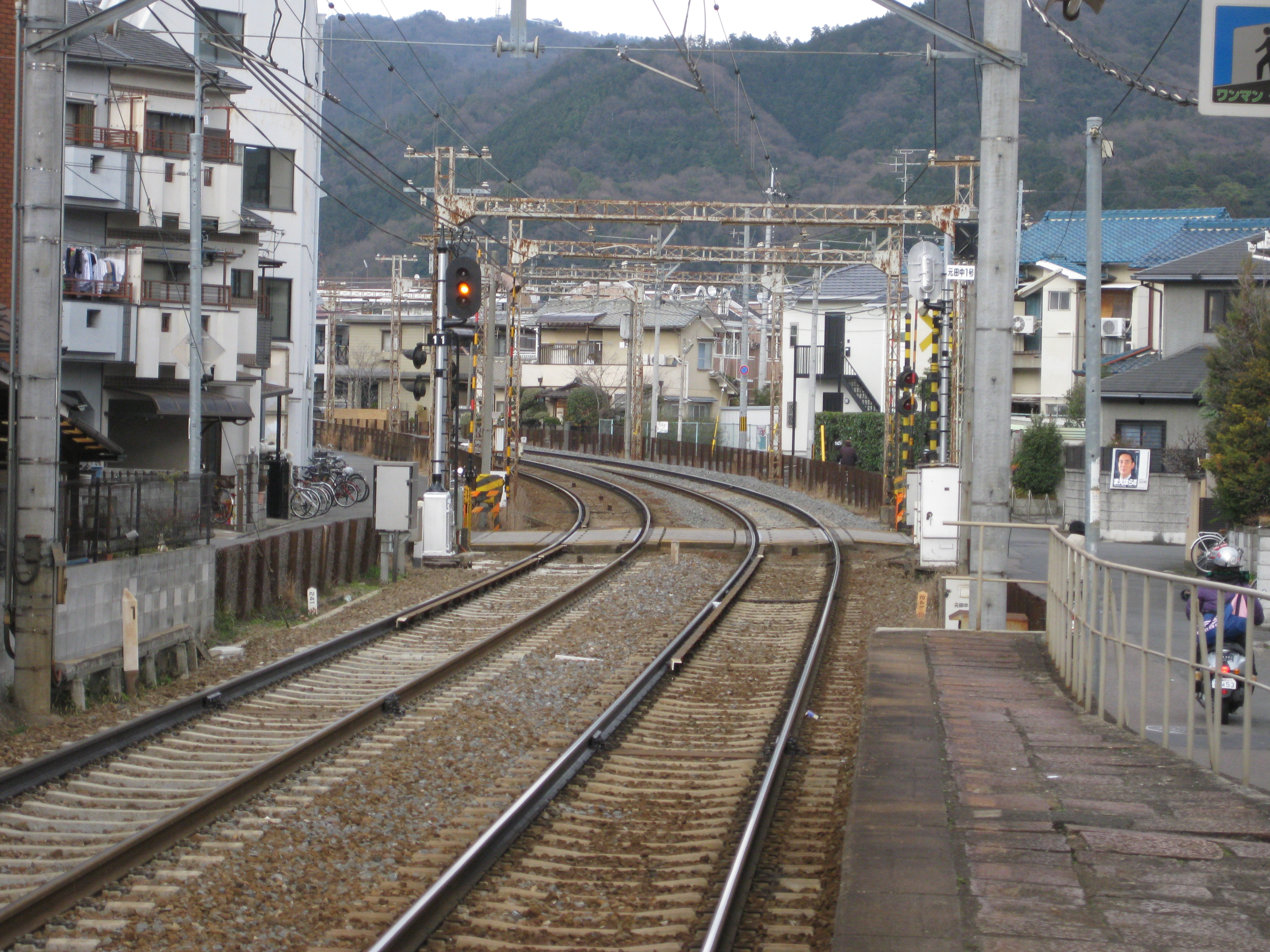
Mototanaka station (for Chayama)

Mototanaka Station (元田中駅, Mototanaka-eki) is a train station located in Sakyō-ku, Kyoto, Kyoto Prefecture, Japan.

== Lines ==
- Eizan Electric Railway (Eiden)
  - Eizan Main Line

== Adjacent stations ==
«	Service	»
Eizan Main Line (E02)
Kurama Line (E02)
Demachiyanagi	-	Chayama·Kyōto-Geijutsudaigaku
