= Kyōto-Seikadai-mae Station =

Railway station in Kyoto, Japan

Coordinates: 35.0731°N 135.7688°E

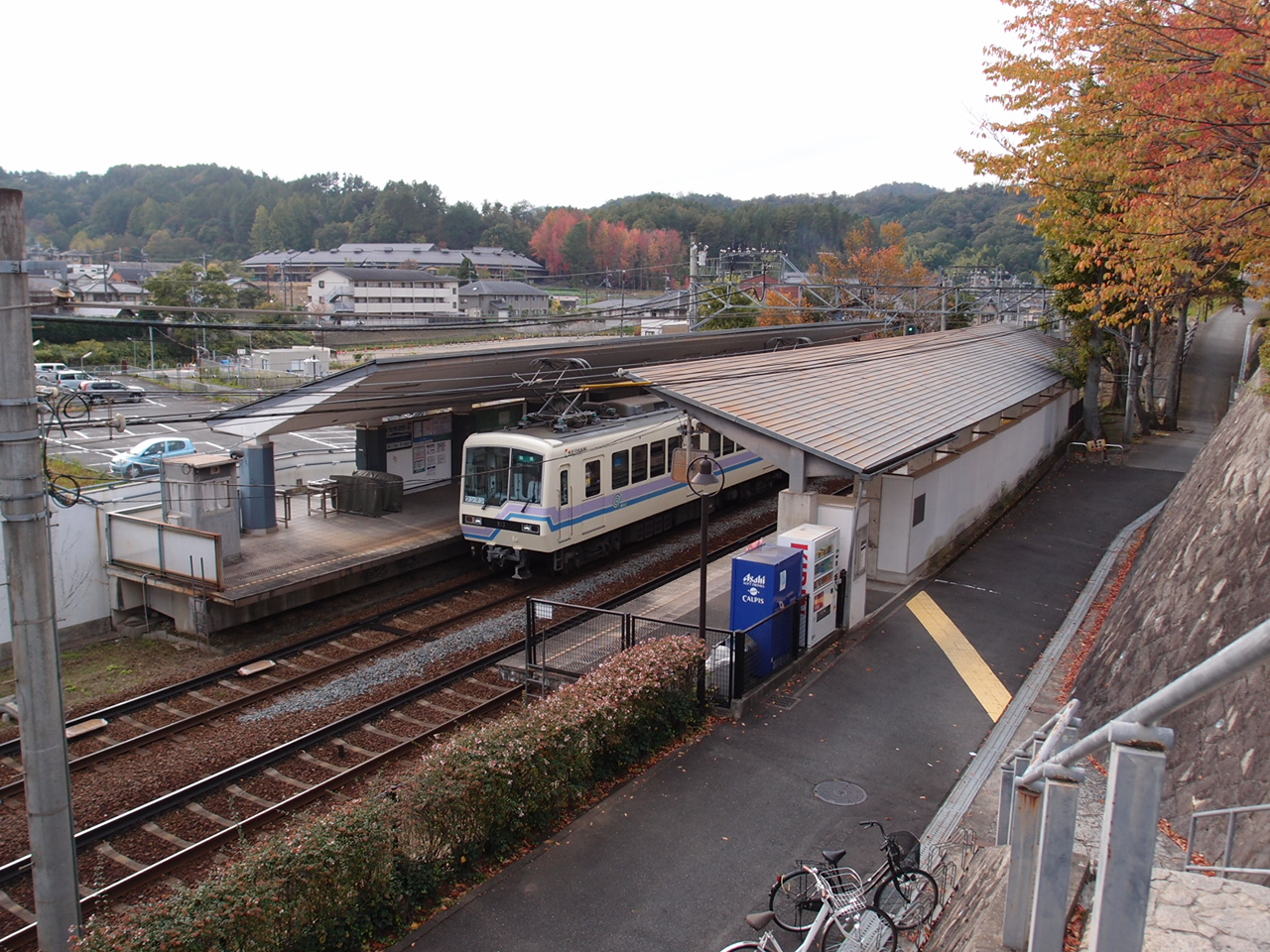
Kyōto-Seikadai-mae Station

Kyōto-Seikadai-mae Station (京都精華大前駅, Kyōto-Seikadai-mae-eki) is a train station located in Sakyō-ku, Kyoto, Kyoto Prefecture, Japan.

== Lines ==
- Eizan Electric Railway (Eiden)
  - Kurama Line

== Layout ==
The station has two side platforms serving two tracks.

== Surrounding area ==
- Kyoto Seika University
- Kyojaku-ji Buddhist Temple

== Adjacent stations ==
«	Service	»
Kurama Line
Kino	-	Nikenchaya
