= Ninose Station =

Railway station in Kyoto, Japan

Coordinates: 35.0981°N 135.7625°E

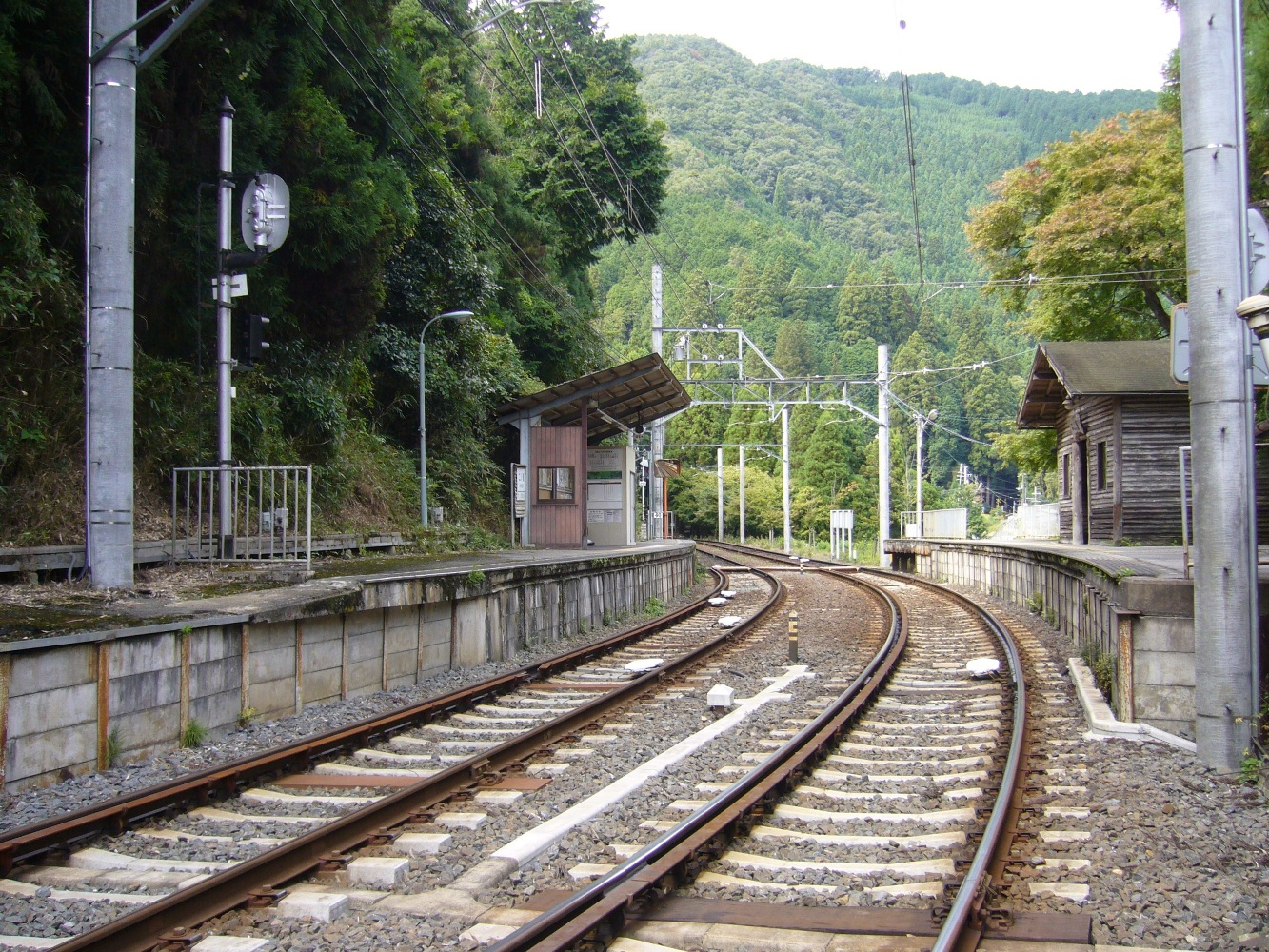
Platforms and tracks

Ninose Station (二ノ瀬駅, Ninose-eki) is a train station located in Sakyō-ku, Kyoto, Kyoto Prefecture, Japan.

== Lines ==
- Eizan Electric Railway (Eiden)
  - Kurama Line

== Layout ==
The station has two side platforms serving two tracks.

== Adjacent stations ==
«	Service	»
Kurama Line
Ichihara	-	Kibuneguchi
