= Hachimanmae Station =

Hachimanmae Station may refer to:

- Hachimanmae Station (Kyoto), a railway station in Kyoto, Japan
- Hachimanmae Station (Wakayama), a railway station in Wakayama, Japan
