= Takekiri eshiki =

Takekiri-eshiki (鞍馬山竹伐会式; "Bamboo cutting festival") is an annual Japanese festival which occurs in June at Kurama-dera.

The event is based on a legend in which a giant serpent was slain. Lengths of bamboo serve as surrogates for the serpent in a re-enactment of the legend.
