= Kino Station =

Railway station in Kyoto, Japan

Coordinates: 35.0709°N 135.7766°E

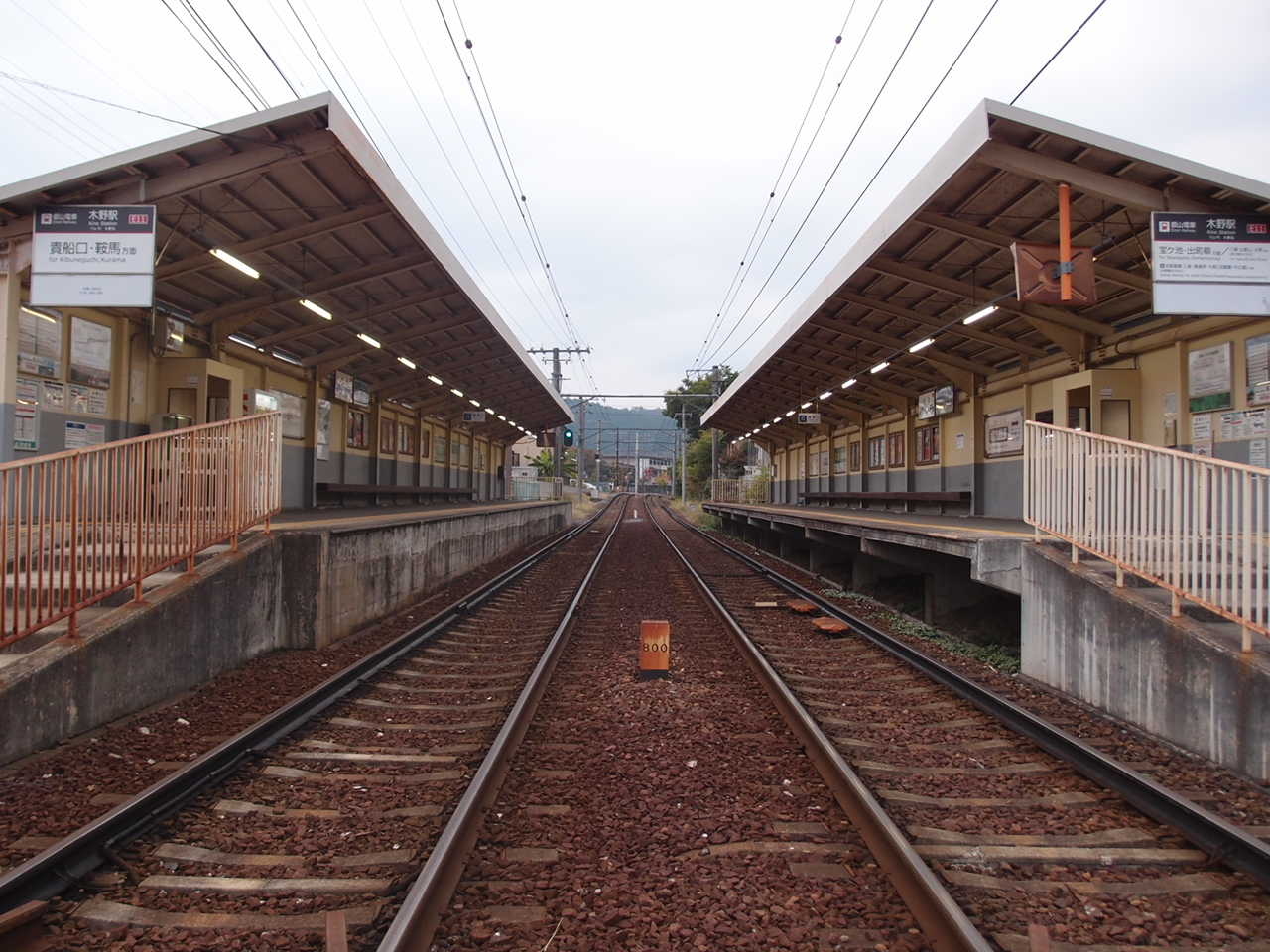
Kino Station

Kino Station (木野駅, Kino-eki) is a train station located in Sakyō-ku, Kyoto, Kyoto Prefecture, Japan.

== Lines ==
- Eizan Electric Railway (Eiden)
  - Kurama Line

== Layout ==
The station has two side platforms serving two tracks.

== Adjacent stations ==
«	Service	»
Kurama Line
Iwakura	-	Kyoto Seikadai-mae
