= Chayama-Kyōto-Geijutsudaigaku Station =

Railway station in Kyoto, Japan

Coordinates: 35°02′18″N 135°47′04″E

Chayama·Kyōto-Geijutsudaigaku Station (茶山・京都芸術大学駅, Chayama-Kyōto-Geijutsudaigaku-eki) is a train station in Sakyō-ku, Kyoto, Japan.

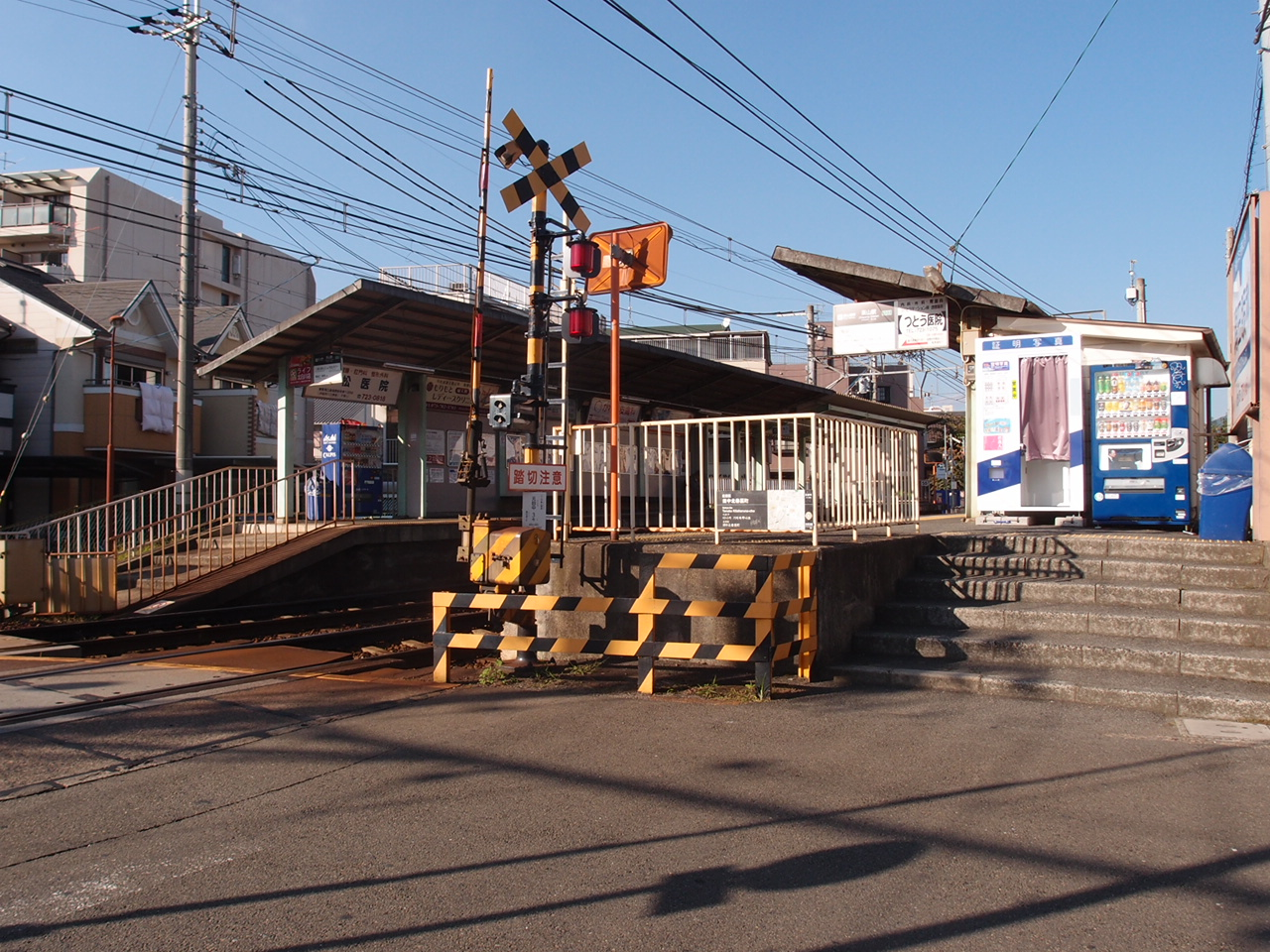
Chayama Station

== Lines ==
- Eizan Electric Railway (Eiden)
  - Eizan Main Line

== History ==
The station opened on September 27, 1925. The station name was changed from Chayama Station to the present one on April 1, 2023.

== Adjacent stations ==
«	Service	»
Eizan Main Line (E03)
Kurama Line (E03)
Mototanaka	-	Ichijōji
