= Kurama Station =

Railway station in Kyoto, Japan

Coordinates: 35.112967°N 135.772541°E

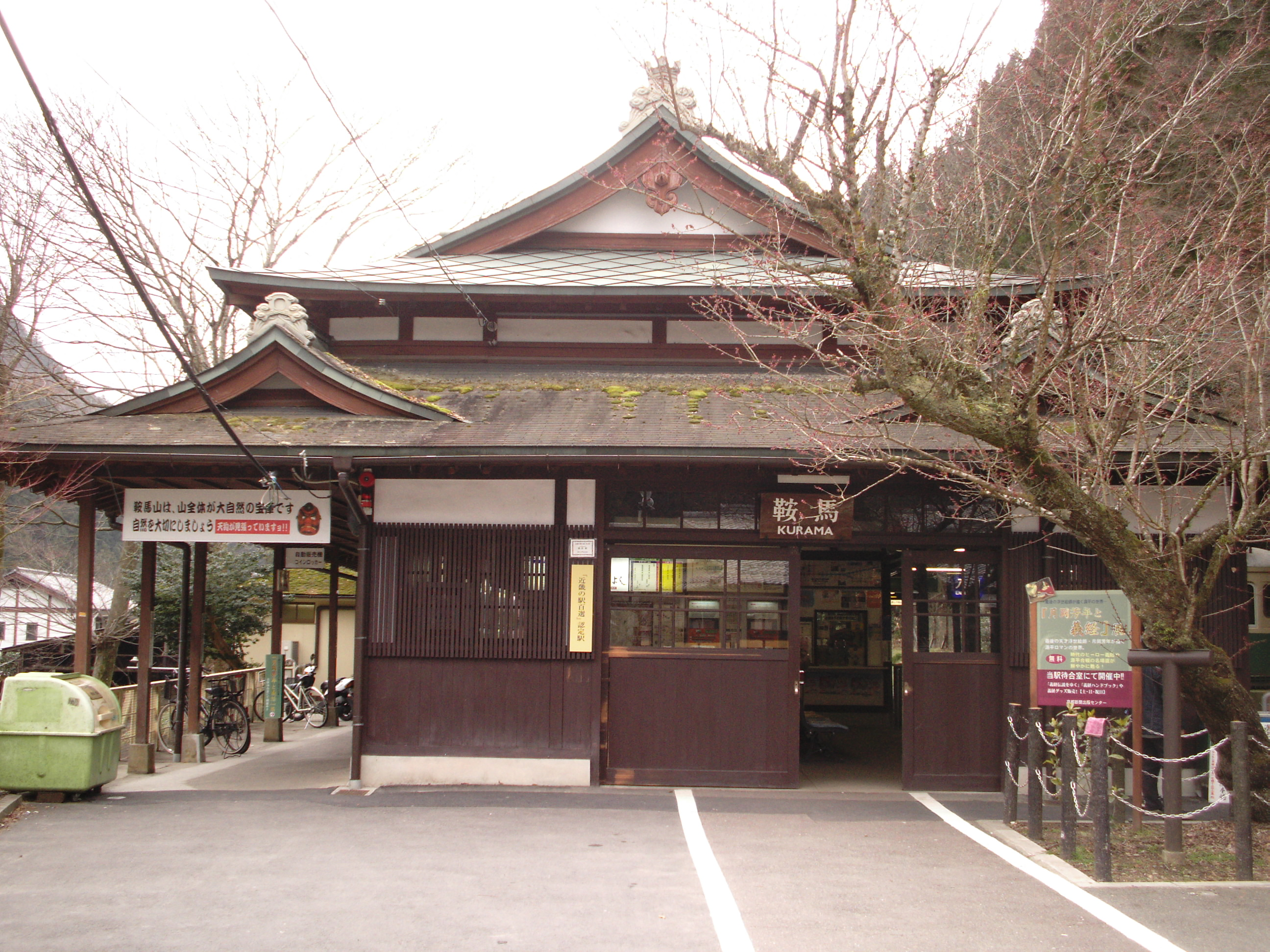
Station building

Kurama Station (鞍馬駅, Kurama-eki, station number: E17) is the terminal station located on the Eizan Electric Railway (Eiden) Kurama Line in Sakyō-ku, Kyoto, Kyoto Prefecture, Japan.

== Connecting line ==
- Kurama-dera Cable (Sanmon Station)

The Kurama-dera cable line is a funicular that takes Kurama-dera temple visitors most of the vertical distance from the Sanmon station to the main temple complex.

It was under reconstruction until the end of March, 2016.

To get there from Kurama station.. leave the station and follow the road to where it meets the main street through Kurama village, Turn left (uphill) and go up the stairway to Kurama-dera keep climbing til you pass the nursery building on the right and bathroom on left.. then next building on right is Sanmon station.

== Layout ==
The station has an island platform serving two tracks.

1, 2	■ Kurama Line	for Takaragaike and Demachiyanagi

== Surroundings ==
- Kurama-dera
- Mount Kurama
- Yuki Shrine

== Adjacent station ==
«	Service	»
Kurama Line (E17)
Kibuneguchi (E16)	-	Terminus
