= Keihan Ōtō Line =

Railway line in Kyoto, Japan

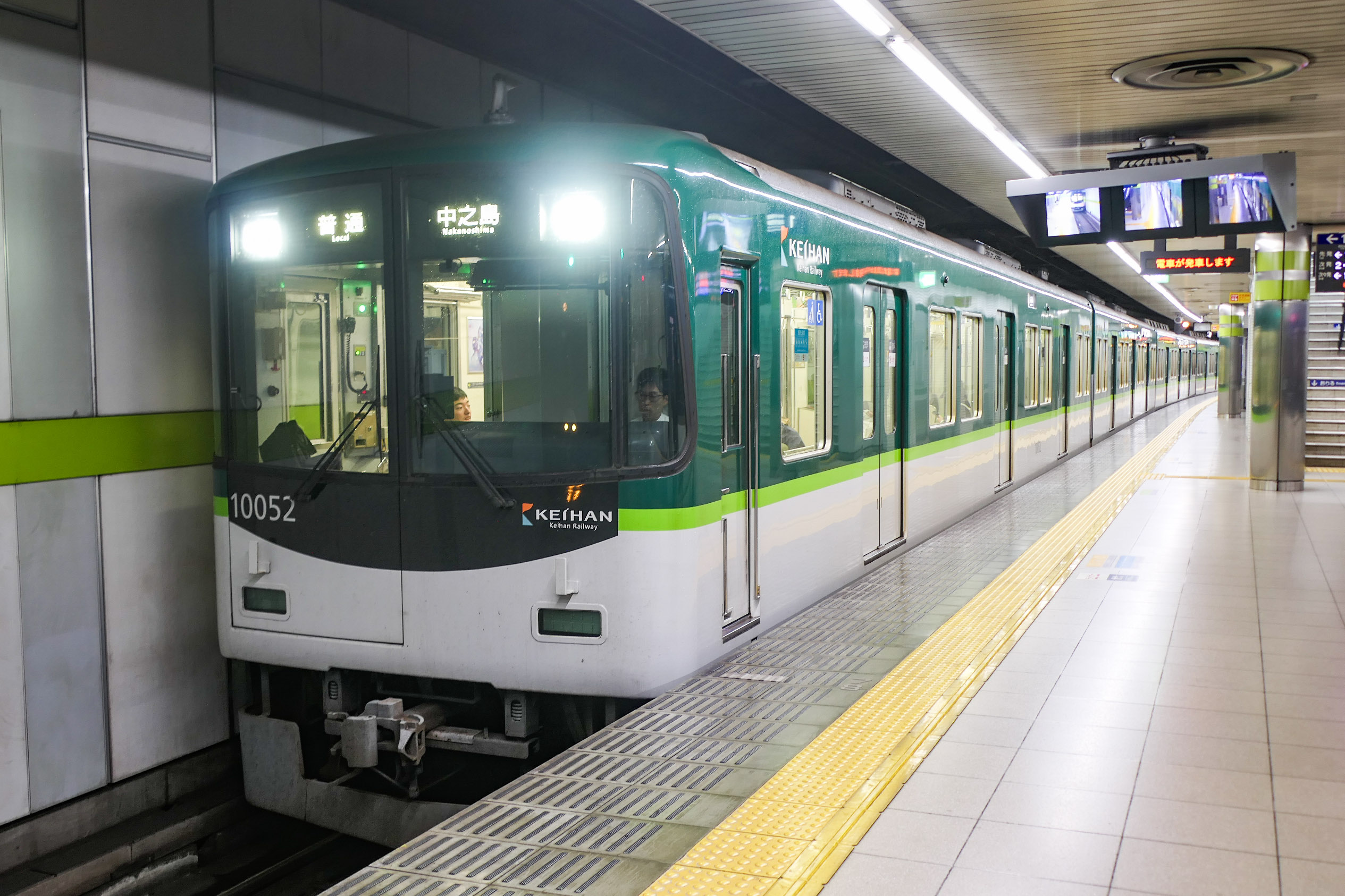
- Keihan 10000 series EMU at Demachiyanagi Station

Overview
- Native name: 京阪鴨東線
- Owner: Keihan Electric Railway
- Locale: Kyoto
- Termini: Sanjō; Demachiyanagi
- Stations: 3

History
- Opened: 5 October 1989; 36 years ago

Technical
- Line length: 2.3 km (1.4 mi)
- Track gauge: 1,435 mm (4 ft 8 1/2 in)
- Electrification: 1,500 V DC, overhead catenary
- Operating speed: 90 km/h (55 mph)

The Ōtō Line (鴨東線, Ōtō-sen) is a railway line in Kyoto that was opened on 5 October 1989 by the Keihan Electric Railway. The Ōtō Line re-established a rail connection between the Keihan Main Line and the Eizan Electric Railway, which had been severed when the Kyoto City streetcars ceased running in 1978. The line is operated as an extension of the Keihan Main Line. All trains continue into the Keihan Main Line and Keihan Nakanoshima Line in Osaka.

The double-track line is situated below Kawabata Street, along the left (eastern) bank of the Kamo River. Despite its length of 2.3 km (1.4 mi), it serves as an important transport corridor in central Kyoto.

== Overview ==
The route name is derived the line's route on the east shore of Kamo River. It is constructed under Kawabata Street along the Kamo River as an underground extension of the Keihan Main Line. The line is only 2.3 km (1.4 mi) long but serves as an important transport corridor in central Kyoto.

=== Addition fares ===
To recover the cost of construction and interest payments (69 billion yen) of the line, a surcharge of 60 yen is added on top of regular fares when a trip uses the line. The recovery rate at the end of FY2016 was 31.8%; most of it recovered by the 60 yen surcharge. It is undecided whether the additional surcharge will be imposed indefinitely.

== History ==
August 29, 1924: Kyoto Electric Light (predecessor of the Keifuku Electric Railway) acquired a license for laying local railways between Demachiyanagi and Sanjo.

April 10, 1950: Keihan Electric Railway established the Ōtō Line Construction Preparation Committee.

July 1, 1972: Kamogawa Electric Railway was established.

February 20, 1974: Provincial railway laying licence between the Keifuku Electric Railway

February 25, 1974: Kamogawa Electric Railway acquires a license for laying a local railway between Demachiyanagi and Sanjo.

November 30, 1984: A groundbreaking ceremony was held at the Ōtō Line construction work.

April 1, 1989: Keihan Electric Railway merges with Kamogawa Electric Railway.

October 5, 1989: Opened as Ōtō Line. The timetable revision accompanying this has been carried out ahead of September 27, until noon October 5 was operated as a forwarding train in the Ōtō Line.

October 19, 2008: Because there is a station of the same name on the Kyoto Municipal Subway Karasuma Line, the Marutamachi Station of this line is renamed to Jingu-Marutamachi Station.

December 5, 2015: ATS operation begins on the Ōtō Line.

== Stations and connections ==
No.	Station	Japanese	Distance (km)	Transfers	Location
KH40	Sanjō	三条	0.0	Keihan Main Line; Tozai Line (Sanjō Keihan)	Higashiyama-ku, Kyoto
KH41	Jingū-Marutamachi	神宮丸太町	1.0		Sakyō-ku, Kyoto
KH42	Demachiyanagi	出町柳	2.3	Eizan Electric Railway Main Line	Sakyō-ku, Kyoto
