= Hachiman-mae Station (Kyoto) =

Railway station in Kyoto, Japan

Coordinates: 35°03′59″N 135°47′33″E

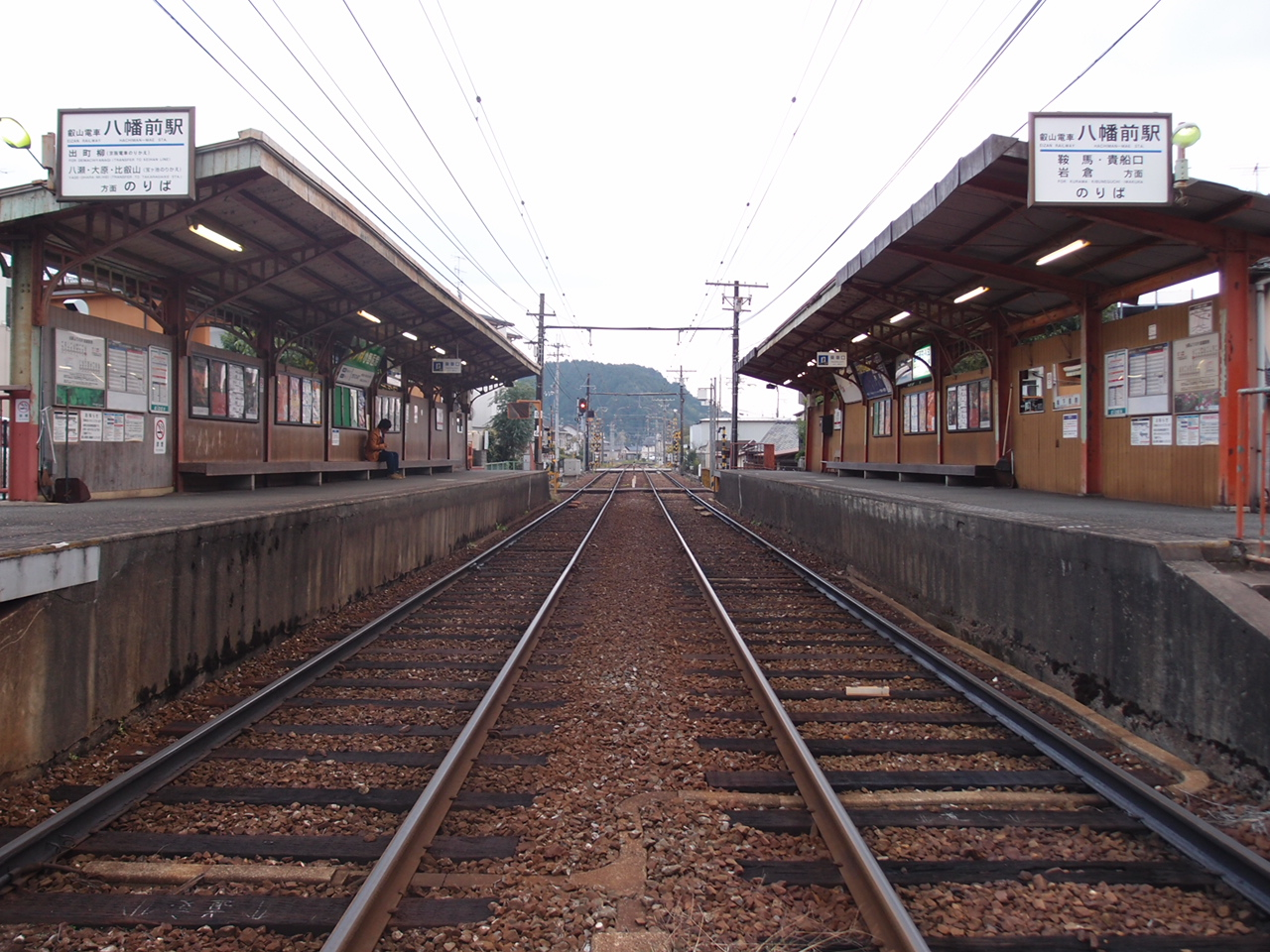
Hachiman-mae Station

Hachiman-mae Station (八幡前駅, Hachiman-mae-eki) is a train station located in Sakyō-ku, Kyoto, Kyoto Prefecture, Japan.

== Lines ==
- Eizan Electric Railway (Eiden)
  - Kurama Line

== Adjacent stations ==
«	Service	»
Kurama Line
Takaragaike	-	Iwakura
