= Yase-Hieizanguchi Station =

Railway station in Kyoto, Japan

Coordinates: 35.065224°N 135.808502°E

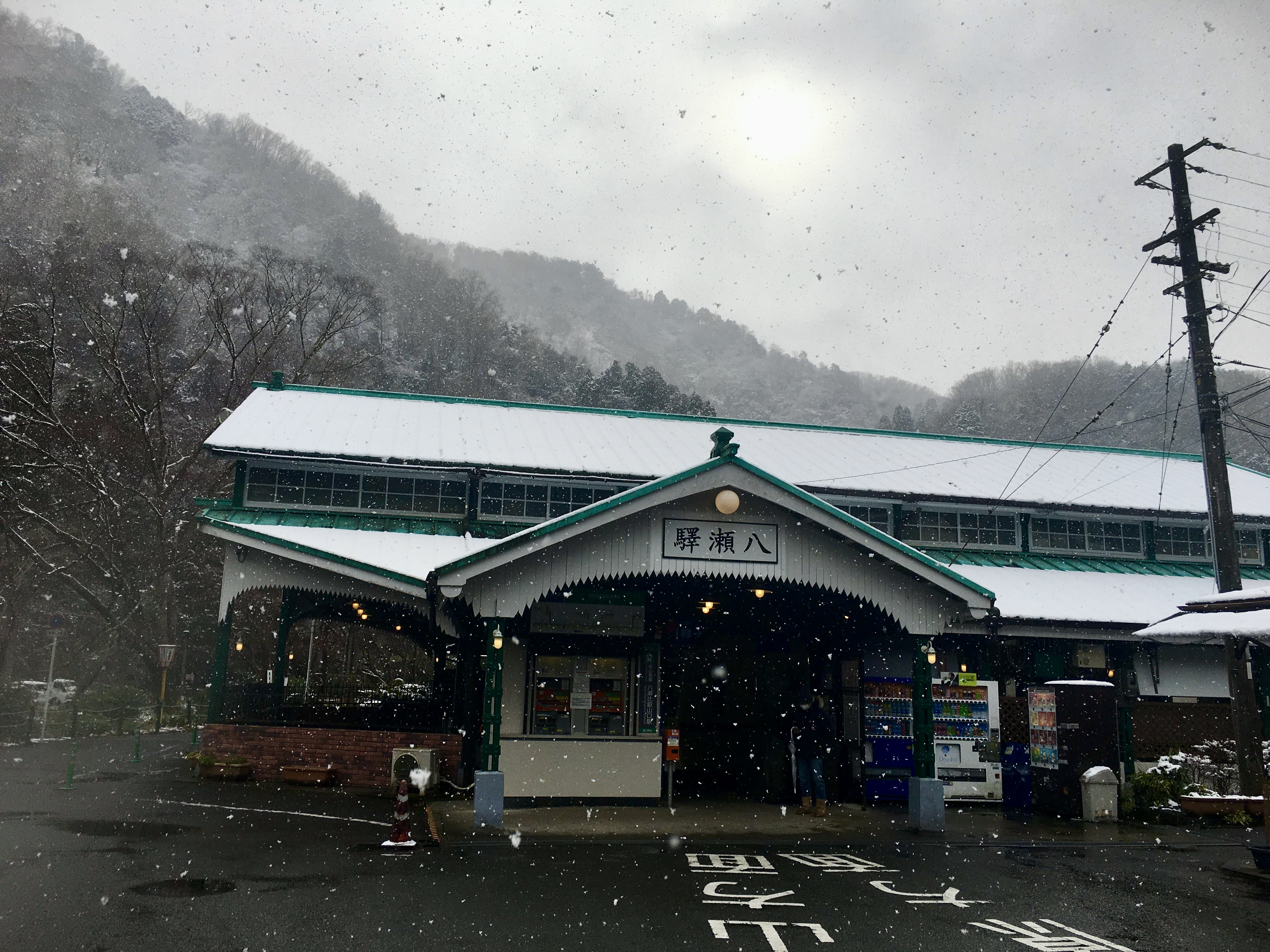
Yase-Hieizanguchi Station, 2022

Yase-Hieizan-guchi Station (八瀬比叡山口駅, Yase-Hieizan-guchi-eki) is a train station located in Sakyō-ku, Kyoto, Kyoto Prefecture, Japan.

== Lines ==
- Eizan Electric Railway (Eiden)
  - Eizan Main Line

== Adjacent stations ==
Preceding station	Eizan Electric Railway	Following station
Miyakehachiman towards Demachiyanagi	Eizan Main Line	Terminus
