= Nikenchaya Station =

Railway station in Kyoto, Japan

Coordinates: 35°04′40″N 135°45′57″E

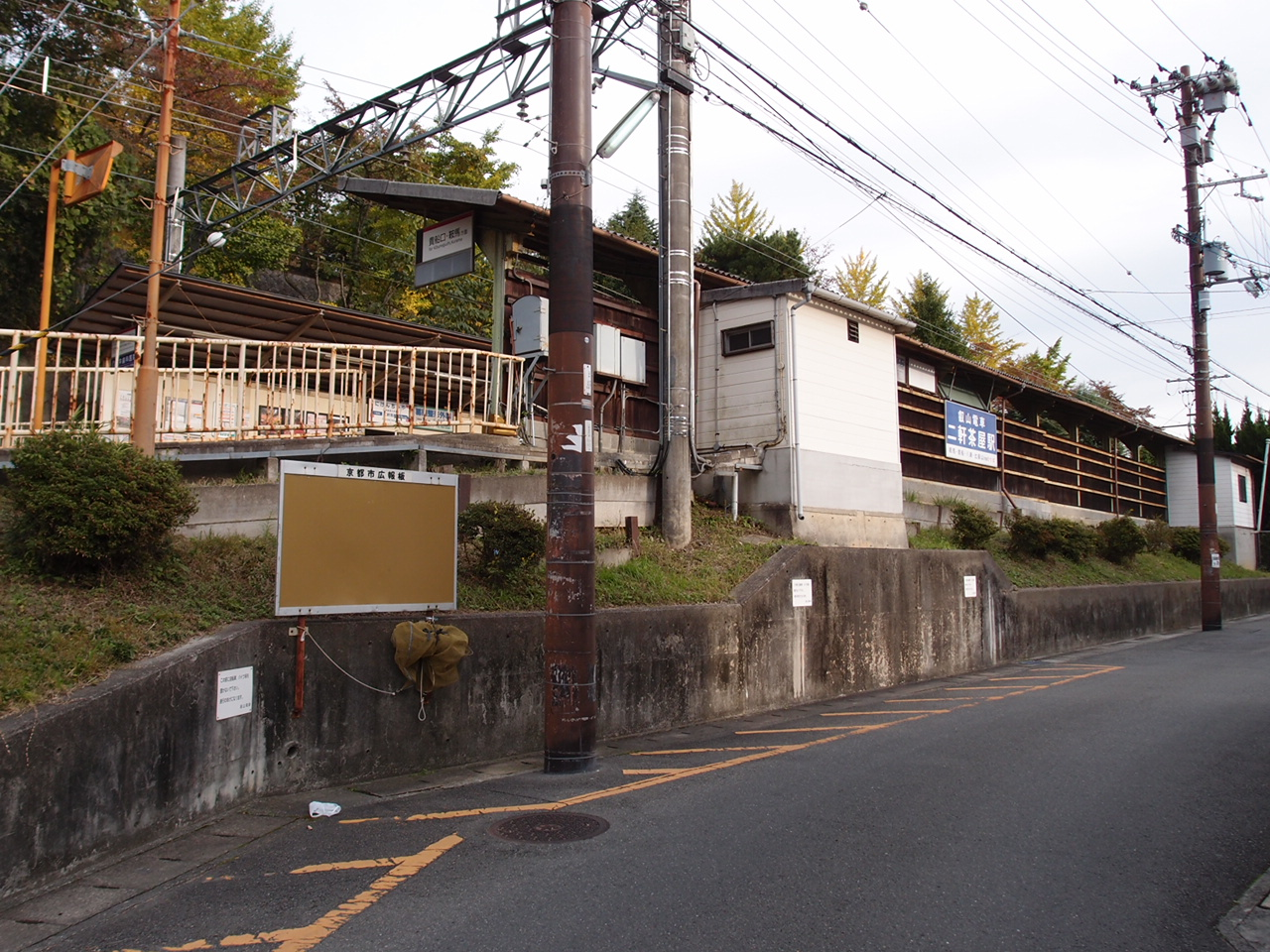
Nikenchaya Station

Nikenchaya Station (二軒茶屋駅, Nikenchaya-eki) is a train station located in Sakyō-ku, Kyoto, Kyoto Prefecture, Japan.

== Lines ==
- Eizan Electric Railway (Eiden)
  - Kurama Line

== Layout ==
The station has two side platforms serving two tracks.

== Adjacent stations ==
«	Service	»
Kurama Line
Kyoto Seikadai-mae	-	Ichihara
