= Kurama-dera =

Temple in Kyoto prefecture, Japan

- 鞍馬寺
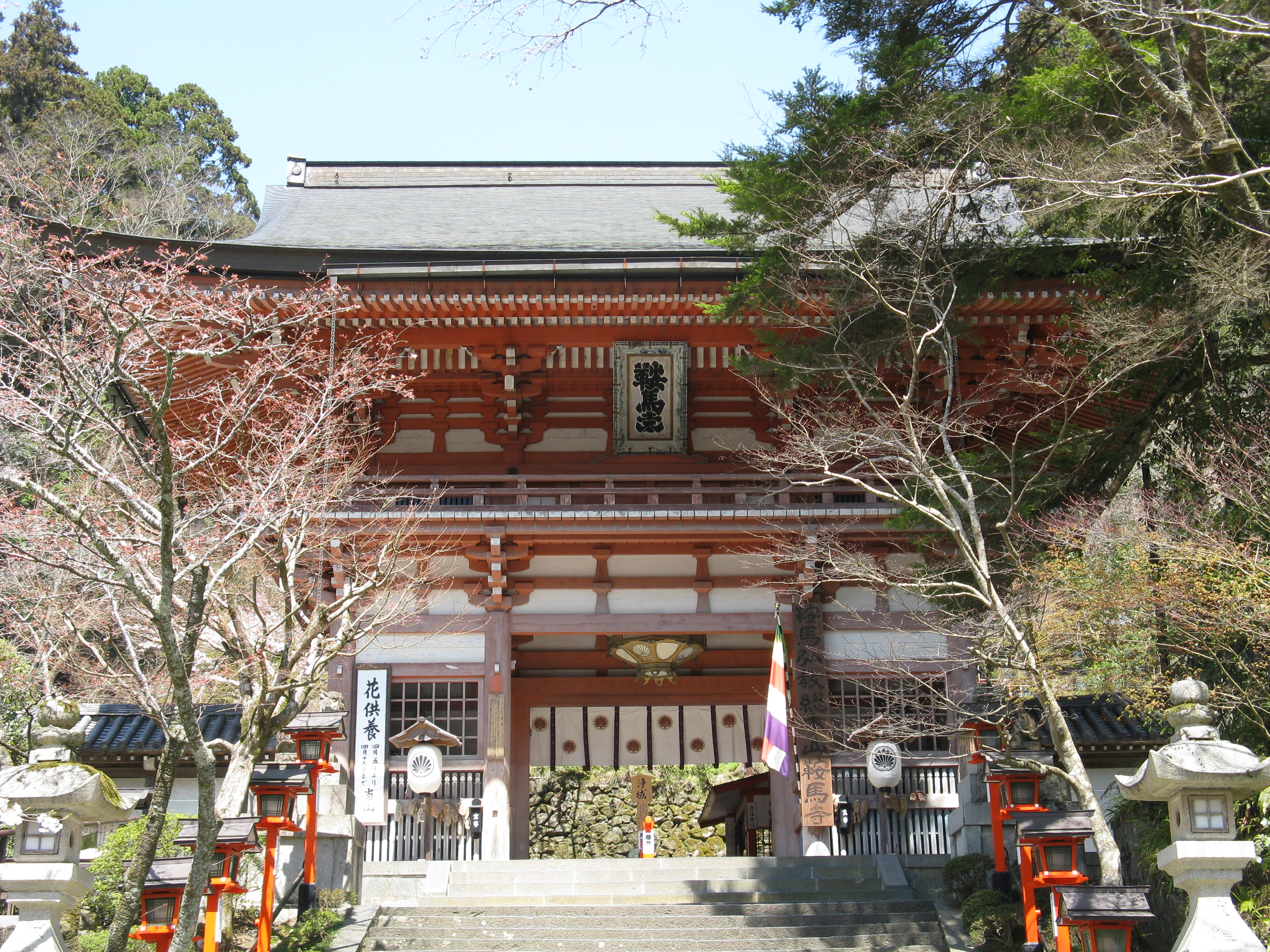
- The main entrance

Religion
- Affiliation: Independent (Kuramakōkyō)
- Deity: Sonten (union of Vaiśravaṇa, Kannon, Defender Lord)

Location
- Location: Sakyō-ku Kurama Honmachi 1074, Kyoto
- Country: Japan
- Interactive map of Kurama-dera
- Coordinates: 35°7′5.02″N 135°46′14.67″E

Architecture
- Founder: Jiànzhēn (鑑禎)
- Completed: 770?

Kurama-dera (鞍馬寺) is a temple in the far north of Kyoto, Japan which houses some National Treasures of Japan. It was a member of the Tendai sect and subordinate to Shōren-in from the 12th century until 1949 when it founded its own religious body. The object of worship is esoteric and unique to the temple. It is said to have been founded by a disciple of Jianzhen.

Situated in secluded wilderness at the base of Mount Kurama, it is accessible by its own cable car line, the Kurama-dera Cable.

== History ==
The temple was founded in the 8th century AD. Its origins are historically unclear, but it is said that the Chinese monk Jianzhen initiated a disciple into the Buddhist path, who saw in a dream in 772 that Mount Kurama had a spiritual power and built an esoteric temple to concentrate and control this power. It was burned down many times throughout the medieval era but the Buddhist statues and treasures inside it were always rescued and are today National Treasures. It is still believed today that tengu and other mountain spirits live in this area.

The temple switched between three different Buddhist sects over the centuries. Finally, in the postwar era, abbot Kouun Shigaraki founded his own religion and split the temple away from Buddhism. Thus the temple was finally able to reconcile with its yamabushi patrons and other unaffiliated, esoteric adherents of mountain worship.

== Object of worship ==
The original objects of worship under the Tendai order were Bishamonten, protector of the north, and the Thousand-Armed Kannon. However, in the worship hall another statue has been added to these two, which the current leadership says creates a trinity called the "Sonten". Bishamonten represents the Sun, Kannon represents Love, and the third statue, the Defender Lord, represents Power, together being the "Spiritual Kings of the World". The Defender Lord came from Venus 6.5 million years ago and is eternally 16 years old due to chemical differences in the atmospheres of the two planets. Some New Age writers identify the Defender Lord with Sanat Kumara.

The actual objects of worship are ordinarily concealed from view, but visitors can see replicas of all three images in the main building. The replica of the Defender Lord depicts a xian-like figure with a long beard, a big nose, wings, and a halo made of leaves. It is thought that the tengu in the area proceed from this Defender Lord.

== Tourism ==
It is an extremely popular temple for Japanese people to visit, owing to the many mysteries and occult events surrounding it. Mt. Kurama is considered to be a mystical place because of the appearance of what are called Tengu, long-nosed legendary creatures found in Japanese folk stories that represented to ancient people the mysterious power of mountains. Mt. Kurama is believed to be the birthplace of reiki, a type of “energy therapy”. The temple, now strongly affiliated with the mountain-ascetics, does appear in the 14th edition of Lonely Planet Japan as a Kyoto Highlight.

== Yuki-jinja ==
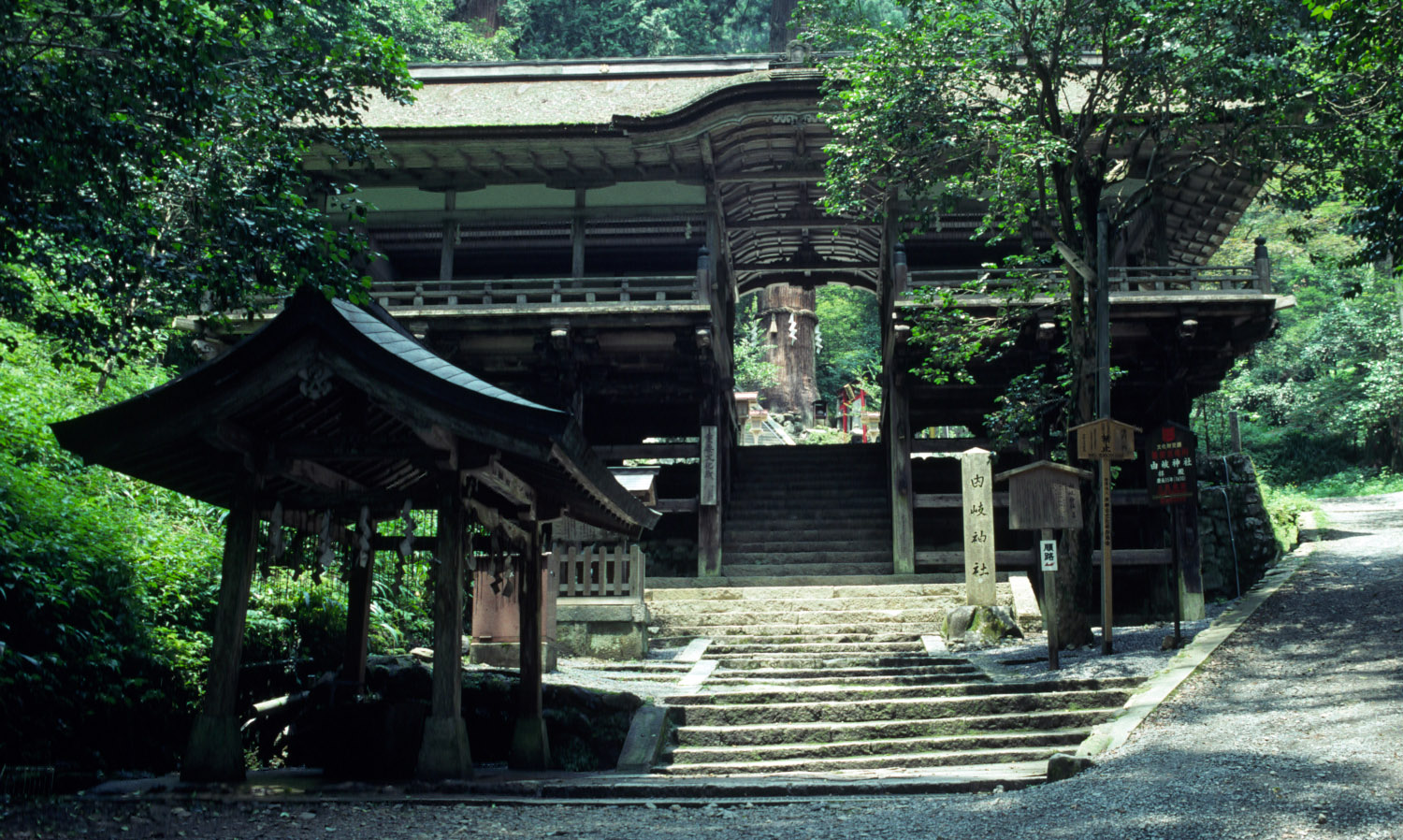
Yuki-jinja

There is a famous Shinto shrine on the grounds of the temple called Yuki-jinja, which was founded in the year 940.
