= Demachiyanagi Station =

Railway station in Kyoto, Japan

Demachiyanagi Station 出町柳駅
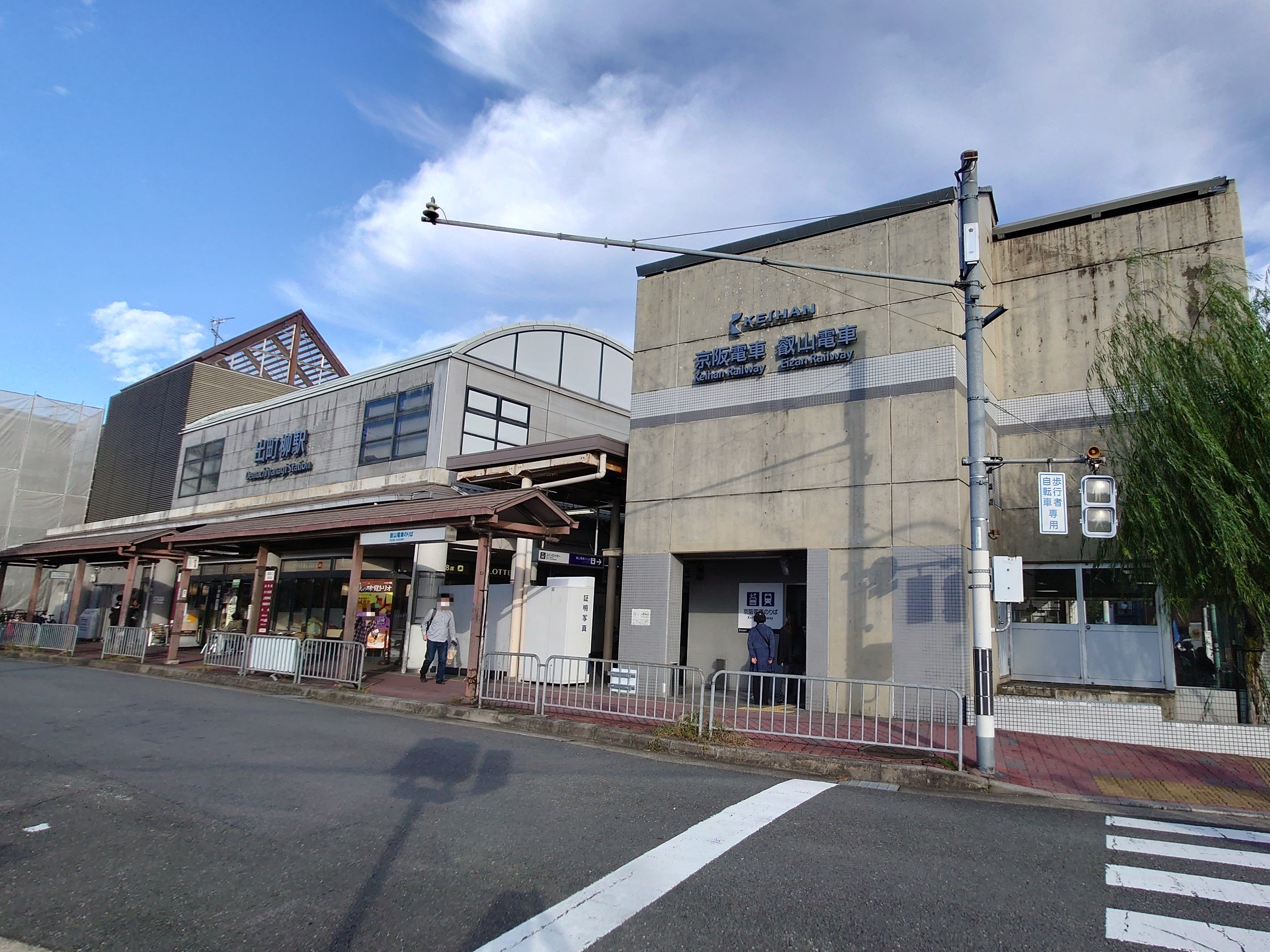
- Demachiyanagi Station in October 2022

General information
- Location: Sakyo, Kyoto, Kyoto （京都市左京区） Japan
- Coordinates: 35°1′49″N 135°46′22″E
- Operator: Eizan Electric Railway; Keihan Electric Railway
- Connections: Bus terminal
Location

Demachiyanagi Station (出町柳駅, Demachiyanagi-eki) is a railway station operated by the Keihan Electric Railway, located in Sakyō-ku, Kyoto. It serves as the northern terminus for the Ōtō Line and the southern terminus for the Main Line of the Eizan Electric Railway.

The name "Demachiyanagi" is the combined name of "Demachi" district around the Kawaramachi-Imadegawa intersection on the west side of Kamo River, and "Yanagi" district around the east side, which surrounds the station.

== Lines ==
- Eizan Electric Railway (Eiden)
  - Eizan Main Line (station number: E01)
- Keihan Electric Railway
  - Ōtō Line (station number: KH42)

== Layout ==
The station is separated into two sections: the ground-level Eiden station and the underground Keihan station. Tracks of the two lines are not connected.

=== Eizan Railway ===
Demachiyanagi Station 出町柳駅
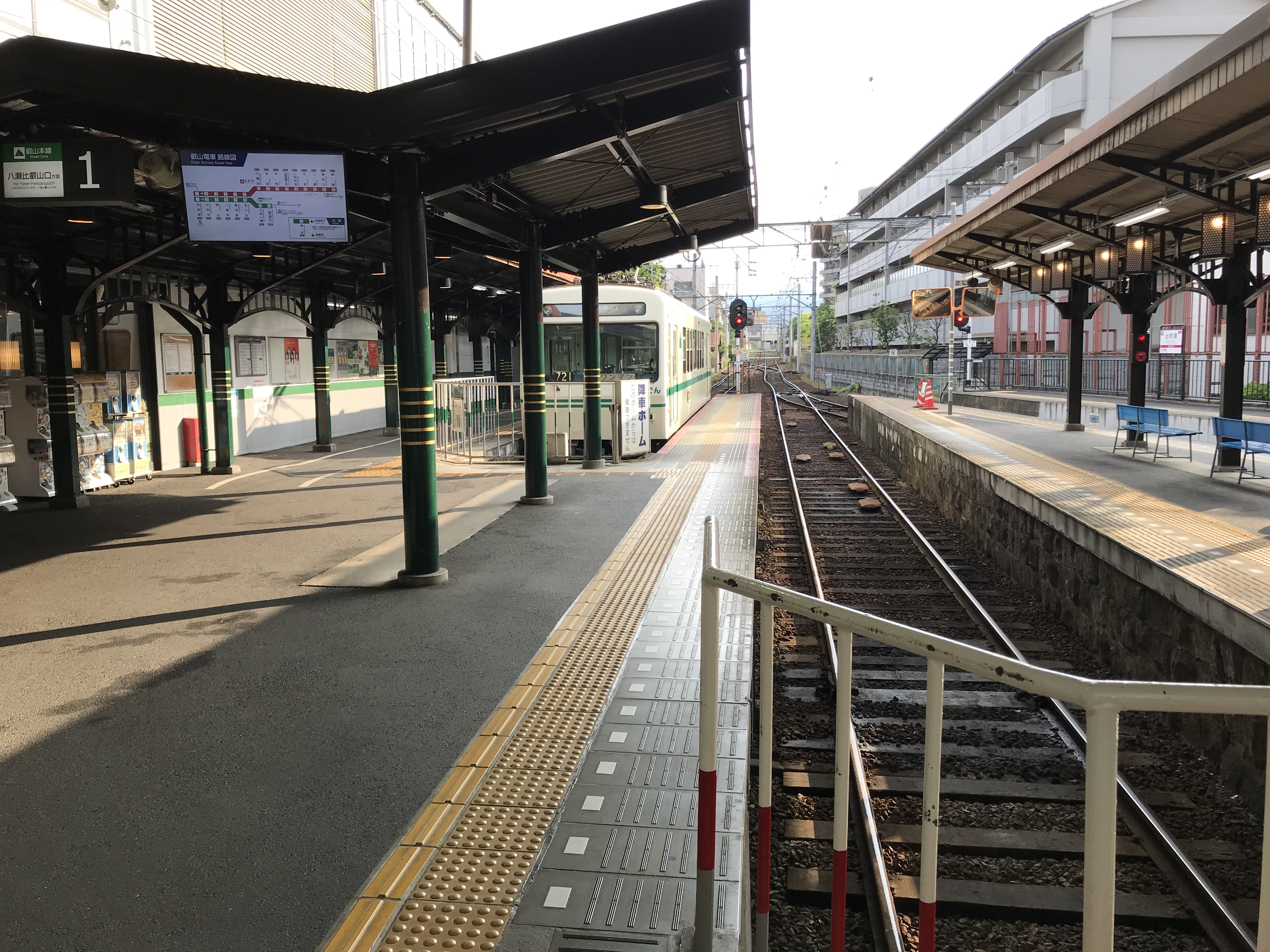
- Eizan Railway platforms in June 2020

General information
- Location: 32-1, Tanaka Kamiyanagicho, Sakyo, Kyoto, Kyoto （京都市左京区田中上柳町32-1） Japan
- System: Eizan Electric Railway station
- Operator: Eizan Electric Railway
- Line: Eizan Main Line

Other information
- Station code: E01

History
- Opened: 1925; 101 years ago

Passengers
- FY2015: 5.5 million

Services
Preceding station	Eizan Electric Railway	Following station
Terminus	Eizan Main Line	Mototanaka E02 towards Yase-Hieizanguchi
Location

There are 4 dead-end platforms with 3 tracks on the ground with bus station and the entrance of Keihan Railway, along Kawabata Dori.

1	■ Eizan Main Line	for Yase-Hieizanguchi (side)
(1, 2)	■ exit	(island)
2, 3	■ Kurama Line	for Nikenchaya and Kurama (island)
(3)	■ exit	(side)

=== Keihan Railway ===
Demachiyanagi Station 出町柳駅
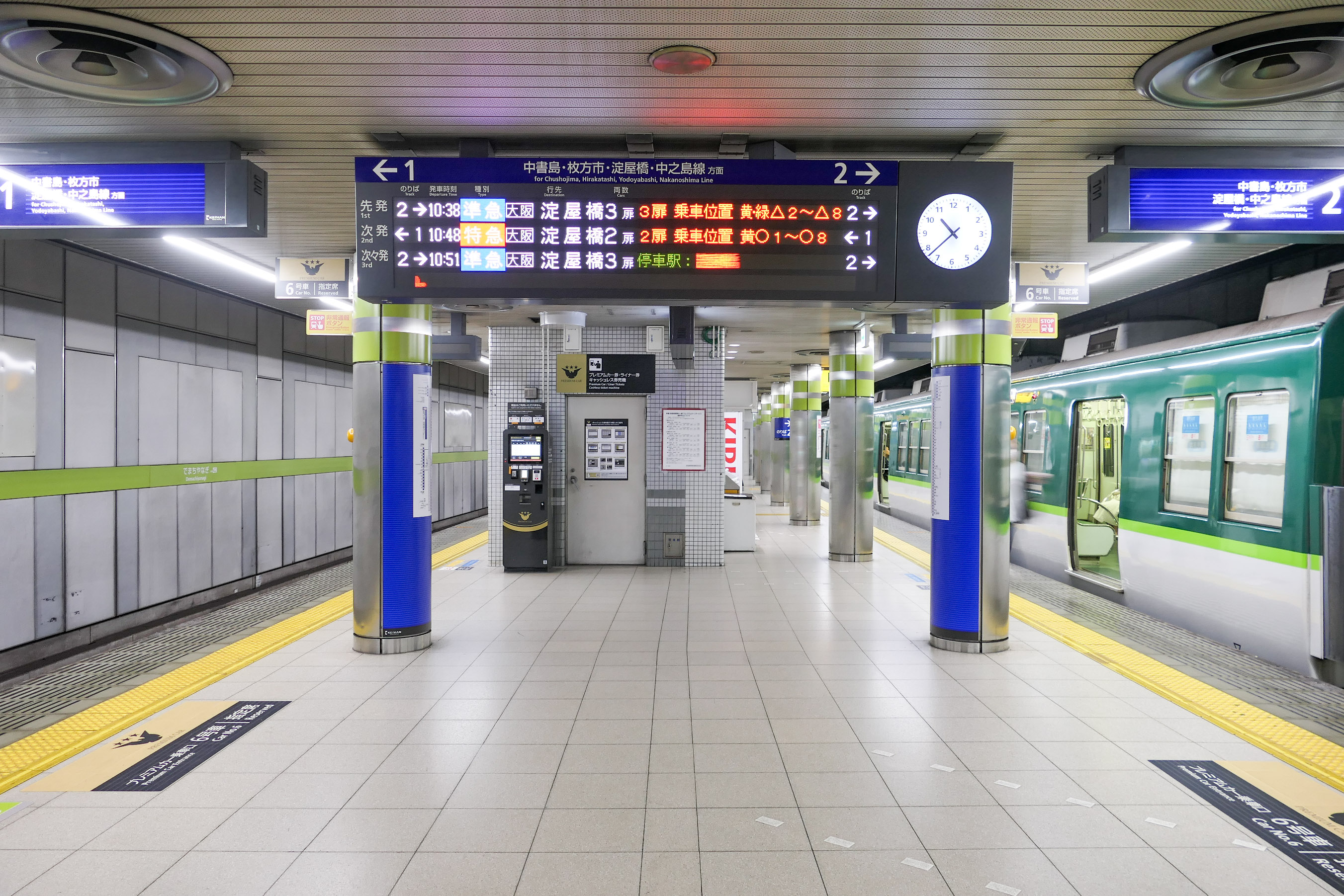
- Keihan Railway platforms in June 2025

General information
- Location: Kamo-ohashi Higashizume, Sakyo, Kyoto, Kyoto （京都市下京区賀茂大橋東詰） Japan
- System: Keihan Railway station
- Operator: Keihan Electric Railway
- Line: Ōtō Line

Other information
- Station code: KH42

History
- Opened: 1989

Passengers
- FY2015: 16.6 million

Services
Preceding station	Keihan Electric Railway	Following station
Jingū-Marutamachi KH41 towards Sanjō	Ōtō Line Local Sub Express Commuter Sub Express Express	Terminus
Sanjō KH40 Terminus	Ōtō Line Rapid Express Commuter Rapid Express Limited Express Rapid Limited Express Liner	Terminus
Location

The station owned by Keihan Railway is located under Kawabata Dori. There is an island platform with 2 tracks under the ticket gates. There are ticket gates in the north and the south. The north one is called "Eiden Gate" and the south one is "Imadegawa Gate".

Eizan Railway and the north side of Imadegawa Dori is connected with the Eiden Gate, and the south side of Imadegawa Dori is with the Imadegawa Gate.

1, 2	■ Oto Line, Keihan Main Line	for Chushojima, Hirakatashi, Yodoyabashi, and Nakanoshima

- Limited express trains usually depart from Track (Platform) 2.

== Surroundings ==
East side of Kamo River and Takano River
- Yoshida Shrine
- Hyakuman-ben Chion-ji
- Kyoto University Yoshida Campus
- Kyoto Computer Gakuin
- The Kyoto College of Graduate Studies for Informatics
- Sakyo-ku General Building, Ktoyo
West side of Kamo River and Takano River
- Kamo Mioya Shrine (Shimogamo Shrine)
- Doshisha University Imadegawa Campus
- Doshisha Women's College of Liberal Arts Imadegawa Campus
- Kyoto Imperial Palace
