= Eizan Electric Railway =

Railway company in Kyoto, Japan

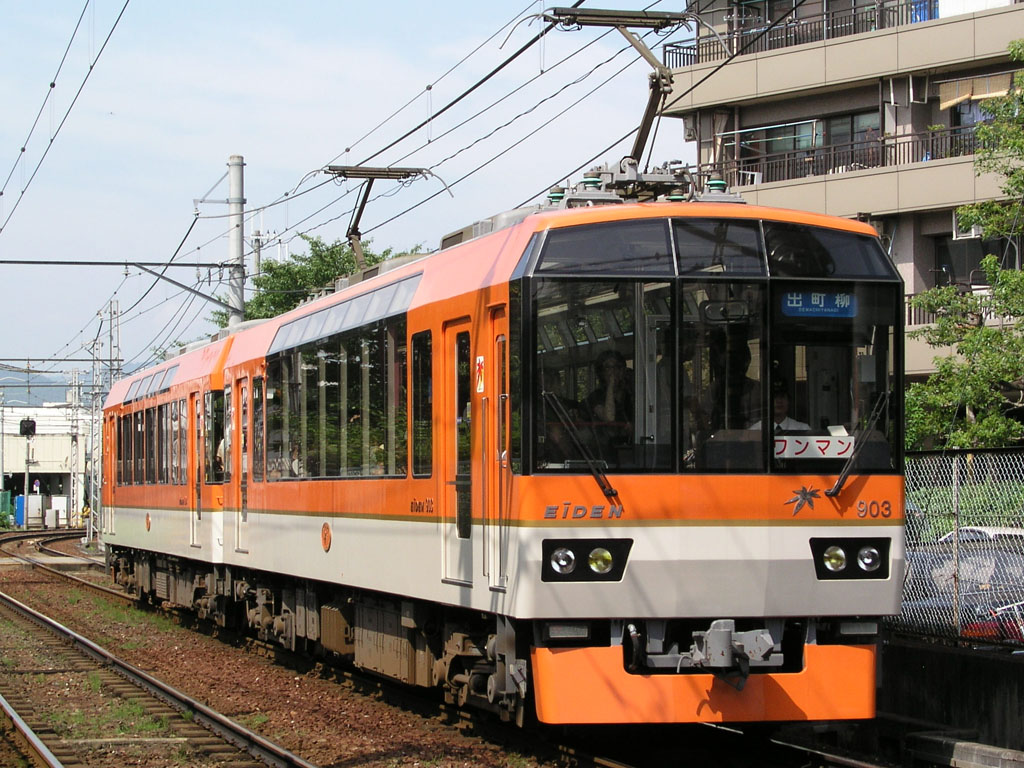
- "Deo 900" series, "KIRARA"

Technical
- Track gauge: 1,435 mm (4 ft 8 1/2 in)
- Electrification: 600 V DC

Eizan Electric Railway Co., Ltd.
- Native name: 叡山電鉄株式会社
- Type: public kabushiki gaisha
- Industry: ground transportation
- Founded: Kyoto, Japan (July 6, 1985 by Keifuku Electric Railroad Co., Ltd.)
- Headquarters: 25-3, Tanaka-Kamiyanagicho, Sakyo-ku, Kyoto, Japan
- Services: rail transit service, etc.
- Parent: Keihan Electric Railway Co., Ltd.

Eizan Electric Railway Main Line train, 2022

Eizan Electric Railway Co., Ltd. (叡山電鉄株式会社, Eizan Dentetsu), also known as Eizan Railway and abbreviated as Eiden (叡電), is a Japanese private railway company whose two lines run entirely in Sakyō-ku in the city of Kyoto, Kyoto Prefecture.

== Naming and history ==
The official abbreviation of this small railway network, Eiden, is derived from the name of its predecessor, the Eizan Electric Railway Division (叡山電鉄部, Eizan Dentetsu-bu) of the Keifuku Electric Railroad. The present company was founded in 1985 as a subsidiary of Keifuku Electric Railroad, one of Japan's major private railways operating in Kyoto, Shiga, and Osaka Prefectures. The purpose of reorganization was to reduce the huge deficit of the Eiden lines, which had been completely isolated from the main Keifuku network since the abandonment of the Kyoto City Tramways in 1978. The split-off was considered to be an urgent matter, awaiting the completion of a rail connection between the two networks of Eiden and Keihan. The Keihan Electric Railway was at that time constructing the Ōtō Line to the Eiden terminal at Demachiyanagi. The opening of the Ōtō Line significantly reduced the deficit of Eiden. Later on, in 2002, all shares of Keifuku were transferred from Keifuku to Keihan, of which Eiden became a wholly owned subsidiary.

== Lines ==
The company operates two train lines arranged in a Y shape.

Eizan Main Line

Demachiyanagi — Yase-Hieizanguchi: 5.6 km

Kurama Line

Takaragaike — Kurama: 8.8 km

== Rolling stock ==
As of 2006, the fleet consisted of 24 electric multiple unit cars.

For service

- "Deo 700" series "Deo 710" type, "Deo 720" type, "Deo 730" type 1-car
- "Deo 800" series 2-car
- "Deo 900" series 2-car named "Kirara"
- "Deo 600" type 2-car

For maintenance

- "Deto 1000" type

== In popular culture ==
The Eiden network featured in the Japanese Rail Sim 3D: Journey to Kyoto train simulation game for the Nintendo 3DS and Nintendo Switch.

In 2025, Eiden partnered with Comic Yuri Hime to celebrate the companies' 100th and 20th anniversaries, respectively, and featured characters from series such as YuruYuri, Wataten!, and Whisper Me a Love Song on its trains and in stations.

== See also ==
- List of railway companies in Japan
