= Railfan (video game) =

2006 video game

- Developers: Taito, Ongakukan
- Publisher: Ongakukan
- Series: Train Simulator
- Platform: PlayStation 3
- Release: JP: December 20, 2006
- Genre: Train simulator
- Mode: Single-player

Railfan (レールファン) is a train simulator co-developed by Ongakukan and Taito for the PlayStation 3 system. It was released in Japan on December 20, 2006.

== Train Simulator series ==
Railfan is a franchise among Ongakukan's popular Train Simulator and was followed by Actainment's Railfan: Taiwan High Speed Rail which was released in Asia in 2007.

== Railfan lines ==
The software is based on three independent lines located in Chicago, Tokyo and Kyoto, Osaka. Series producer and Ongakukan CEO Minoru Mukaiya's team has captured each line in Full HD, including the stations which are located either in Illinois or in Japan.

=== JR East Chūō Main Line (Tokyo) ===
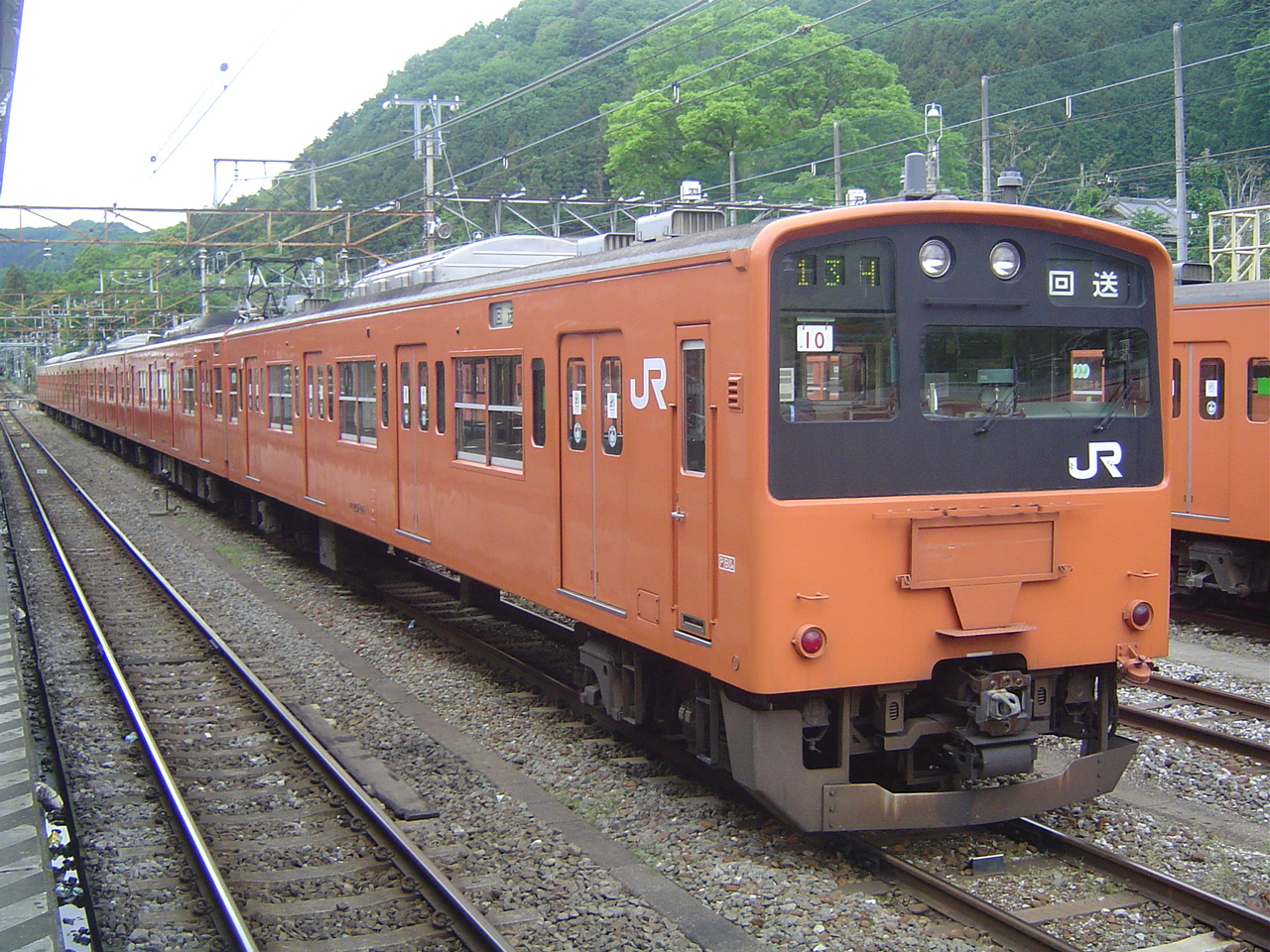
Chūō Main Line 201 series train

Available line in Tokyo is the East Japan Railway Company Chūō Main Line from the Mitaka Station to the Tokyo Station. Rolling stock is the JR201 (201系). Stations are available in the following order:

1. Mitaka
2. Kichijōji
3. Nishi-Ogikubo
4. Ogikubo
5. Asagaya
6. Kōenji
7. Nakano
8. Higashi-Nakano
9. Ōkubo
10. Shinjuku
11. Yoyogi
12. Sendagaya
13. Shinanomachi
14. Yotsuya
15. Iidabashi
16. Suidōbashi
17. Ochanomizu
18. Kanda
19. Tokyo

=== CTA Brown Line (Chicago) ===
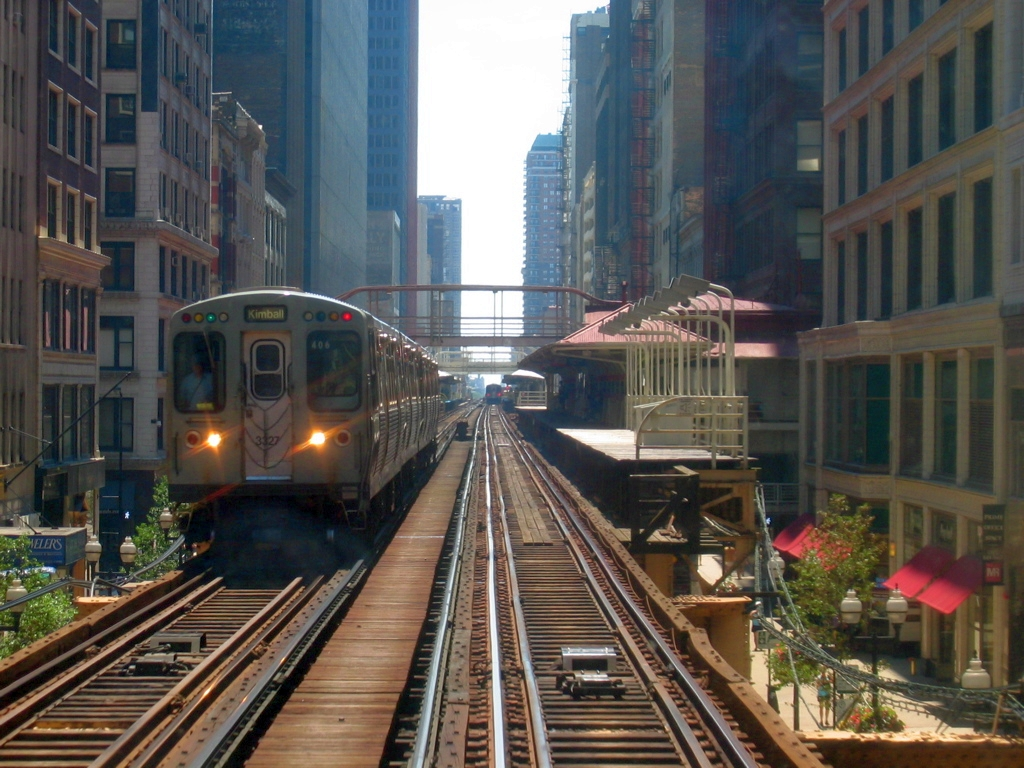
Brown Line 3200-Series train

The Chicago Transit Authority (CTA) Brown Line (Fullerton~The Loop~Fullerton) includes 14 stations. A 4-car CTA3200 'L' rolling stock train is available on this line. Stations are available in the following order:

1. Fullerton
2. Armitage
3. Sedgwick
4. Chicago
5. Merchandise Mart
6. Washington
7. Quincy
8. La Salle
9. Library
10. Adams
11. Madison
12. Randolph
13. State/Lake
14. Clark
15. Merchandise Mart
16. Chicago
17. Sedgwick
18. Armitage
19. Fullerton

=== KER Keihan Main Line (Kyoto, Osaka) ===
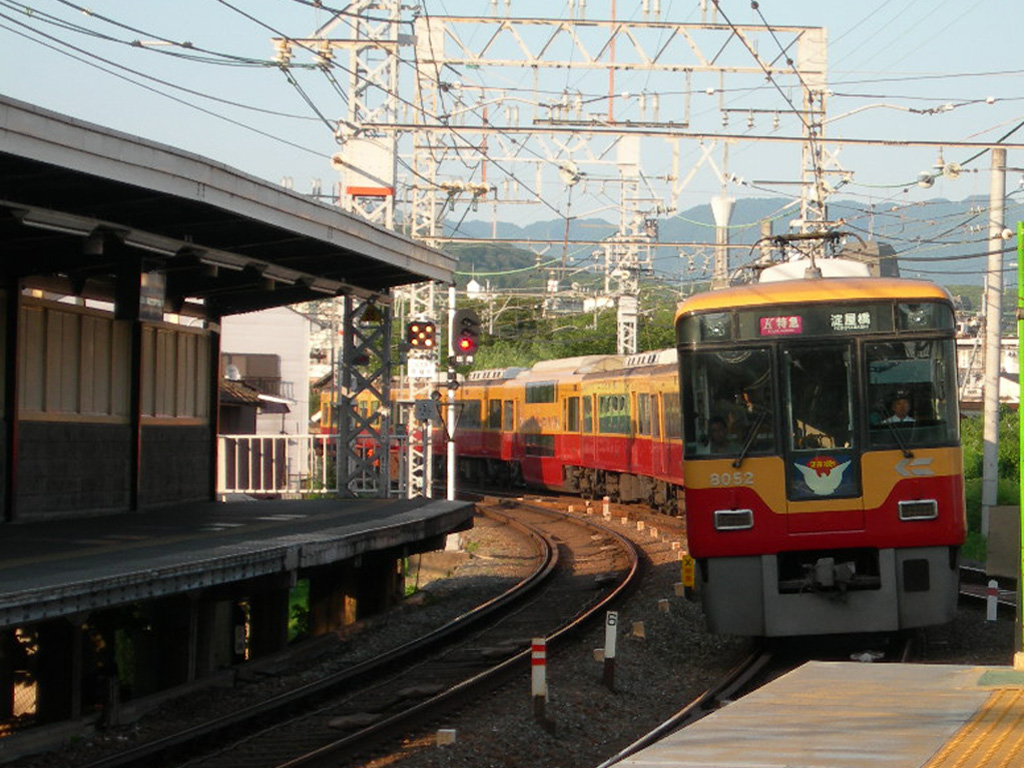
Keihan Main Line 8000 series train

The Keihan Electric Railway Keihan Main Line (Sanjō~Yodoyabashi) is about 51 km. Available train is the Keian 8000 (8000系). Stations are available in the following order:

1. Demachiyanagi
2. Marutamachi
3. Sanjō
4. Shijō
5. Gojō
6. Shichijō
7. Tofukuji
8. Tobakaido
9. Fushimi-inari
10. Fukakusa
11. Fujinomori
12. Sumizome
13. Tambabashi
14. Fushimi-momoyama
15. Chushojima
16. Yodo
17. Yawatashi
18. Hashimoto
19. Kuzuha
20. Makino
21. Goten-yama
22. Hirakatashi
23. Hirakata-koen
24. Kozenji
25. Korien
26. Neyagawashi
27. Kayashima
28. Owada
29. Furukawabashi
30. Kadomashi
31. Nishisanso
32. Moriguchishi
33. Doi
34. Takii
35. Sembayashi
36. Morishoji
37. Sekime
38. Noe
39. Kyobashi
40. Temmabashi
41. Kitahama
42. Yodoyabashi

== Modes ==
The software includes two game modes plus an extra mode dedicated to collectible content.

=== Mission ===
The Mission mode is a driving tutorial including several basic and progressive lessons such as learning how to start and stop the train and limitation and traffic signboards. These missions are specific to each train.

=== Train Tour ===
The tour mode allows to select the station to start and stop at. Once the train is stopped a station it is possible to tour the area using tourism spots.

=== My collection ===
Replay: this feature allows to watch a saved demonstration game and to take live snapshots.

Car Collection: this feature allows to get "Replay" mode unlocked train model profiles. Collection differs from a line to another.

Movie Collection: this feature allows to watch unlocked game videos including opening and ending movies.

== Promotion video ==
A promotion video mostly consisting of behind the scenes from the Chicago production was made available on the game's official website and was later added in Sony Computer Entertainment Korea's product page.
