= Furukawabashi Station =

Railway station in Kadoma, Osaka Prefecture, Japan

Furukawabashi Station 古川橋駅
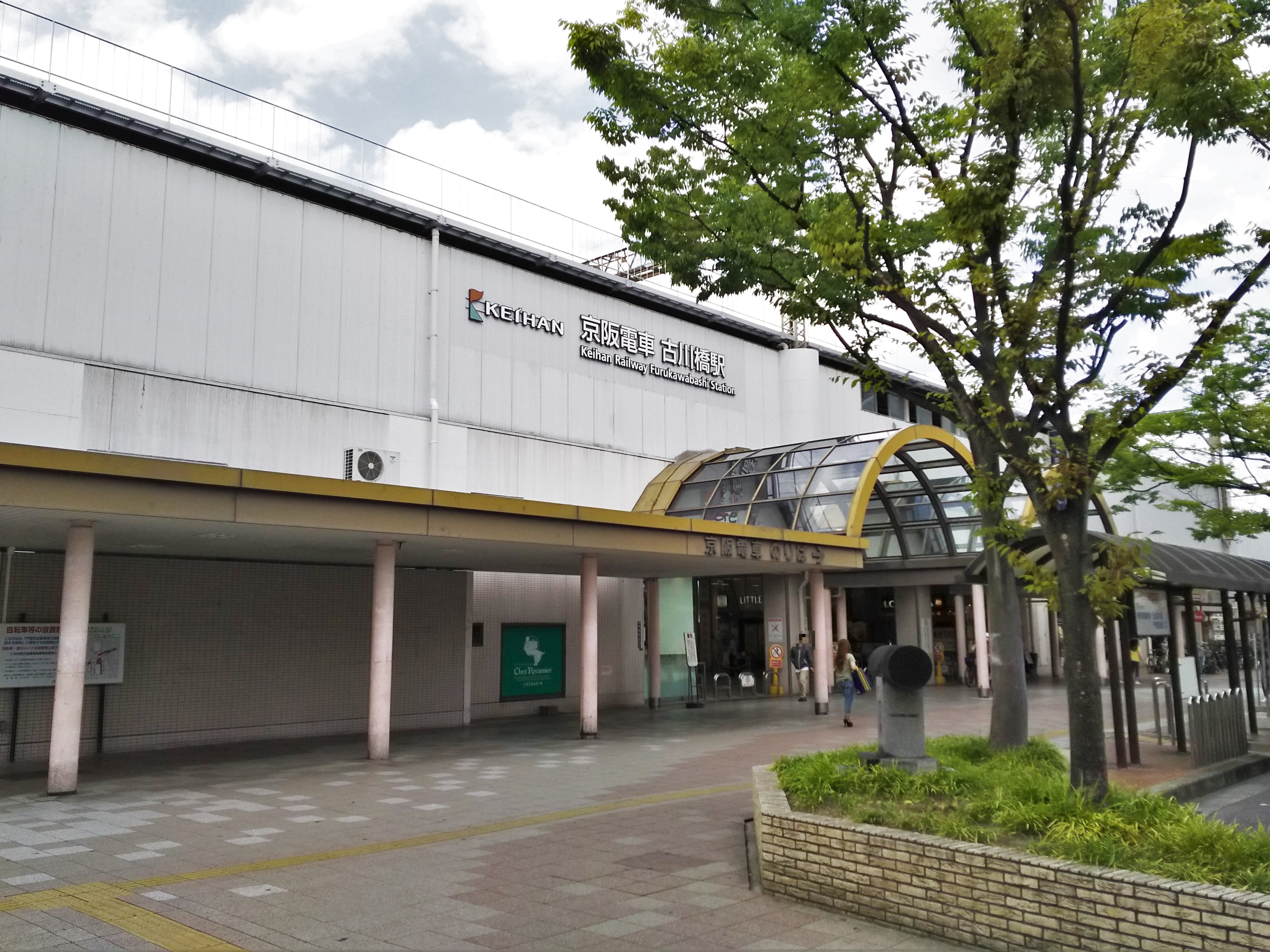
- Furukawabashi Station, August 2016

General information
- Location: 3 Kōfukuchō, Kadoma-shi, Osaka-fu 571-0066; Japan
- Coordinates: 34.7398°N 135.5915°E
- Operator: Keihan Electric Railway
- Line: ■ Keihan Main Line
- Distance: 10.8 km from Yodoyabashi
- Platforms: 2 side platforms

Other information
- Status: Staffed
- Station code: KH14
- Website: Official website

History
- Opened: 15 April 1910

Passengers
- FY2019: 21,929 daily
Location
- Location within Osaka Prefecture Location within Japan

Furukawabashi Station (古川橋駅, Furukawabashi-eki) is a passenger railway station in located in the city of Kadoma, Osaka Prefecture, Japan, operated by the private railway company Keihan Electric Railway.

== Lines ==
Furukawabashi Station is served by the Keihan Main Line, and is located 10.8 km from the starting point of the line at Yodoyabashi Station.

== Station layout ==
The station has two elevated side platforms, with the station building underneath.

== Platforms ==
1	■ Keihan Main Line	for Kayashima, Hirakatashi, Sanjō and Demachiyanagi
2	■ Keihan Main Line	for Moriguchishi, Kyōbashi, and Yodoyabashi

== Adjacent stations ==
«	Service	»
Keihan Main Line
Rapid Limited Express for Demachiyanagi (快速特急): Does not stop at this station
Limited Express (特急): Does not stop at this station
Commuter Rapid Express for Nakanoshima (通勤快急): Does not stop at this station
Rapid Express (快速急行): Does not stop at this station
Midnight Express for Kuzuha (深夜急行): Does not stop at this station
Express (急行): Does not stop at this station
Commuter Sub Express for Yodoyabashi or Nakanoshima (通勤準急): Does not stop at this station
Sub Express (準急): Does not stop at this station
Kadomashi	Semi-Express (区間急行)	Ōwada
Kadomashi	Local (普通)	Ōwada

== History ==
The station was opened on April 15, 1910

== Passenger statistics ==
In fiscal 2019, the station was used by an average of 21,929 passengers daily.

== Surrounding area ==
- Kadoma Citizens' Culture Center Lumiere Hall
- Kadoma City Hall

== See also ==
- List of railway stations in Japan
