= Ōwada Station (Osaka) =

Railway station in Kadoma, Osaka Prefecture, Japan

Ōwada Station 大和田駅
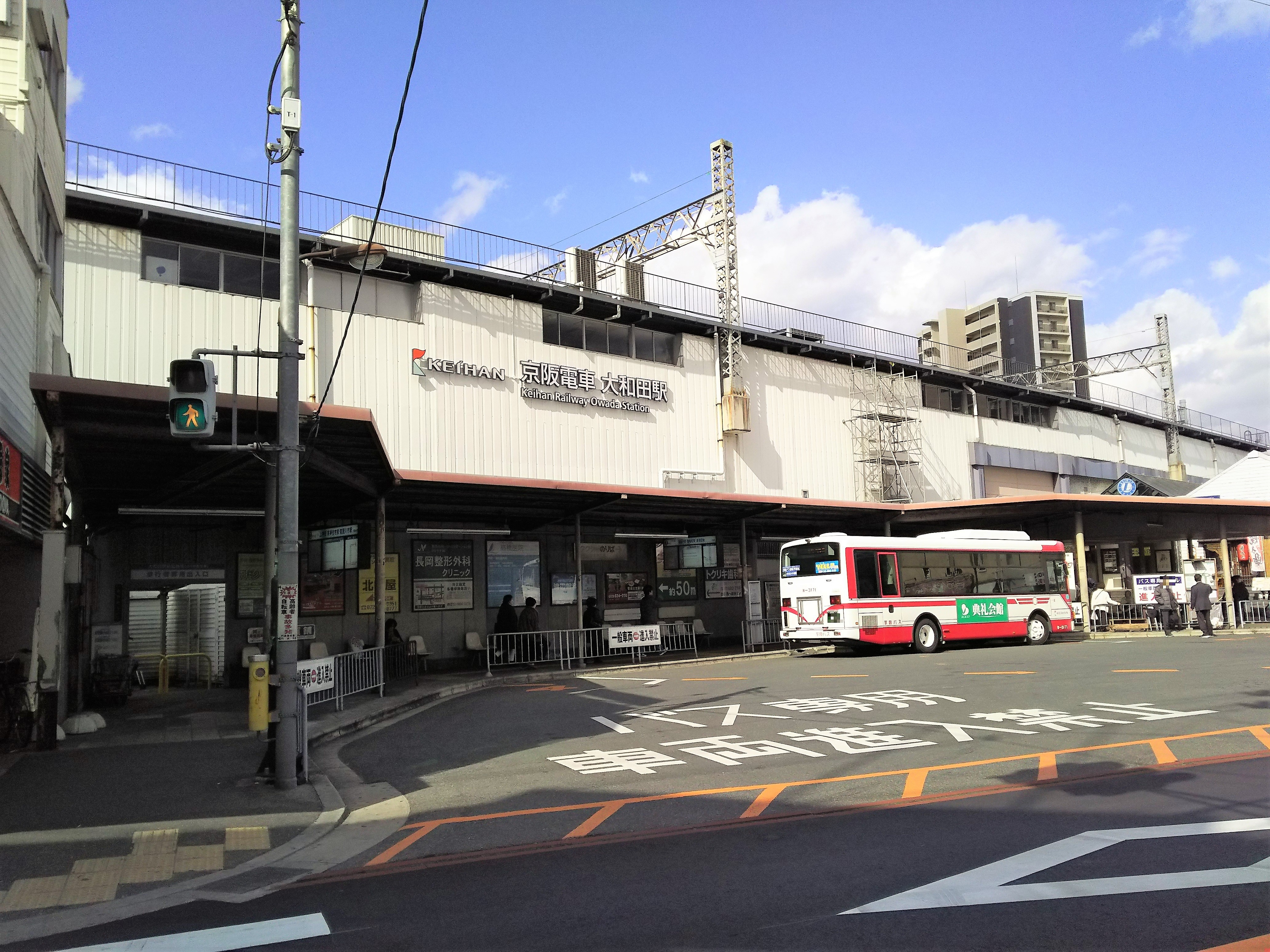
- Ōwada Station, March 2017

General information
- Location: 17 Jōshōjichō, Kadoma-shi, Osaka-fu 571-0063; Japan
- Coordinates: 34°44′35″N 135°36′09″E
- Operator: Keihan Electric Railway
- Line: ■ Keihan Main Line
- Distance: 12.0 km from Yodoyabashi
- Platforms: 2 side platforms

Other information
- Status: Staffed
- Station code: KH15
- Website: Official website

History
- Opened: 4 October 1932

Passengers
- FY2019: 22,252 daily
Location
- Location within Osaka Prefecture Location within Japan

Ōwada Station (大和田駅, Ōwada-eki) is a passenger railway station in located in the city of Kadoma, Osaka Prefecture, Japan, operated by the private railway company Keihan Electric Railway.

== Lines ==
Ōwada Station is served by the Keihan Main Line, and is located 12.0 km from the starting point of the line at Yodoyabashi Station.

== Station layout ==
The station has two elevated side side platforms, with the station building underneath.

== Platforms ==
1	■ Keihan Main Line	for Kayashima, Hirakatashi, Sanjō and Demachiyanagi
2	■ Keihan Main Line	for Moriguchishi, Kyōbashi, and Yodoyabashi

== Adjacent stations ==
«	Service	»
Keihan Main Line
Rapid Limited Express for Demachiyanagi (快速特急): Does not stop at this station
Limited Express (特急): Does not stop at this station
Commuter Rapid Express for Nakanoshima (通勤快急): Does not stop at this station
Rapid Express (快速急行): Does not stop at this station
Midnight Express for Kuzuha (深夜急行): Does not stop at this station
Express (急行): Does not stop at this station
Commuter Sub Express for Yodoyabashi or Nakanoshima (通勤準急): Does not stop at this station
Sub Express (準急): Does not stop at this station
Furukawabashi	Semi-Express (区間急行)	Kayashima
Furukawabashi	Local (普通)	Kayashima

== History ==
The station was opened on October 4, 1932

== Passenger statistics ==
In fiscal 2019, the station was used by an average of 22,252 passengers daily (boarding passengers only).

== Surrounding area ==
- Osaka International University Moriguchi Campus
- Osaka International Owada Junior and Senior High School
