= Kōrien Station =

Railway station in Neyagawa, Osaka Prefecture, Japan

Kōrien Station 香里園駅
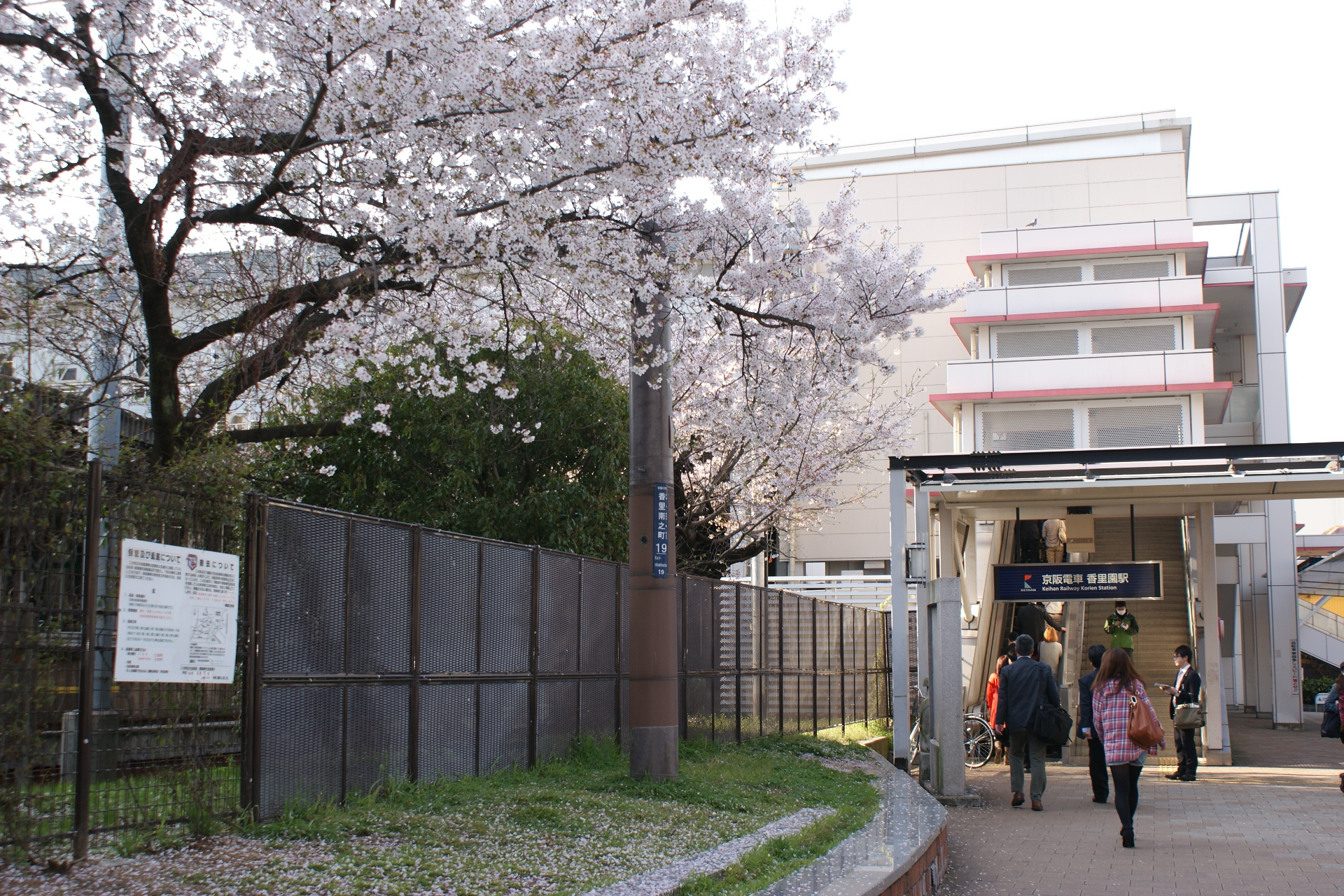
- Kōrien Station, West exit, April 2012

General information
- Location: 19 Kōri Minaminochō, Neyagawa-shi, Osaka-fu 572-0084; Japan
- Coordinates: 34°47′4.84″N 135°37′51.74″E
- Operator: Keihan Electric Railway
- Line: ■ Keihan Main Line
- Distance: 17.6 km from Yodoyabashi
- Platforms: 2 island platforms
- Connections: Bus terminal

Other information
- Status: Staffed
- Station code: KH18
- Website: Official website

History
- Opened: 15 April 1910
- Former names: Kōri (until 1938)

Passengers
- FY2019: 59,025 daily
Location
- Location within Osaka Prefecture Location within Japan

Kōrien Station (香里園駅, Kōrien-eki) is a passenger railway station in located in the city of Neyagawa, Osaka Prefecture, Japan, operated by the private railway company Keihan Electric Railway.

== Lines ==
Kōrien Station is served by the Keihan Main Line, and is located 17.6 km from the starting point of the line at Yodoyabashi Station.

== Station layout ==
The station has two island platforms connected by an elevated station building.

== Platforms ==
1,2	■ Keihan Main Line	for Kayashima, Hirakatashi, Sanjō and Demachiyanagi
3, 4	■ Keihan Main Line	for Moriguchishi, Kyōbashi, Yodoyabashi and Nakanoshima

== Adjacent stations ==
«	Service	»
Keihan Railway Keihan Main Line
Neyagawashi	Local	Kōzenji
Neyagawashi	Semi-express	Kōzenji
Neyagawashi	Sub-express	Kōzenji
Neyagawashi	Commuter Sub-express (only running for Yodoyabashi or Nakanoshima in the morning on weekdays)	Kōzenji
Neyagawashi	Express	Hirakatakōen
Neyagawashi	Midnight Express (only running for Kuzuha)	Hirakatashi
Neyagawashi	Rapid Express	Hirakatashi
Neyagawashi	Commuter Rapid Express (only running for Nakanoshima in the morning on weekdays)	Hirakatashi
Limited Express: Does not stop at this station

== History ==
The station was opened on April 15, 1910 as Kōri Station (香里駅). It was renamed on April 1, 1938.

== Future plans ==
The facilities are expected to be moved to a new elevated station by 2028. Construction has been in progress since September 2022.

== Passenger statistics ==
In fiscal 2019, the station was used by an average of 59,025 passengers daily.

== Surrounding area ==
- Kōrien Daiei Hondori Shopping Street (using the west exit, 4 minutes on foot)
- Kōrien station square shopping street (using the west exit, 1 minute walk)
- Kōrien Chuo Shopping Street (using the west exit, 6 minutes walk to the north)
- Kōrien Shinmachi Shopping Street
