= Takii Station =

Railway station in Moriguchi, Osaka Prefecture, Japan

Takii Station 滝井駅
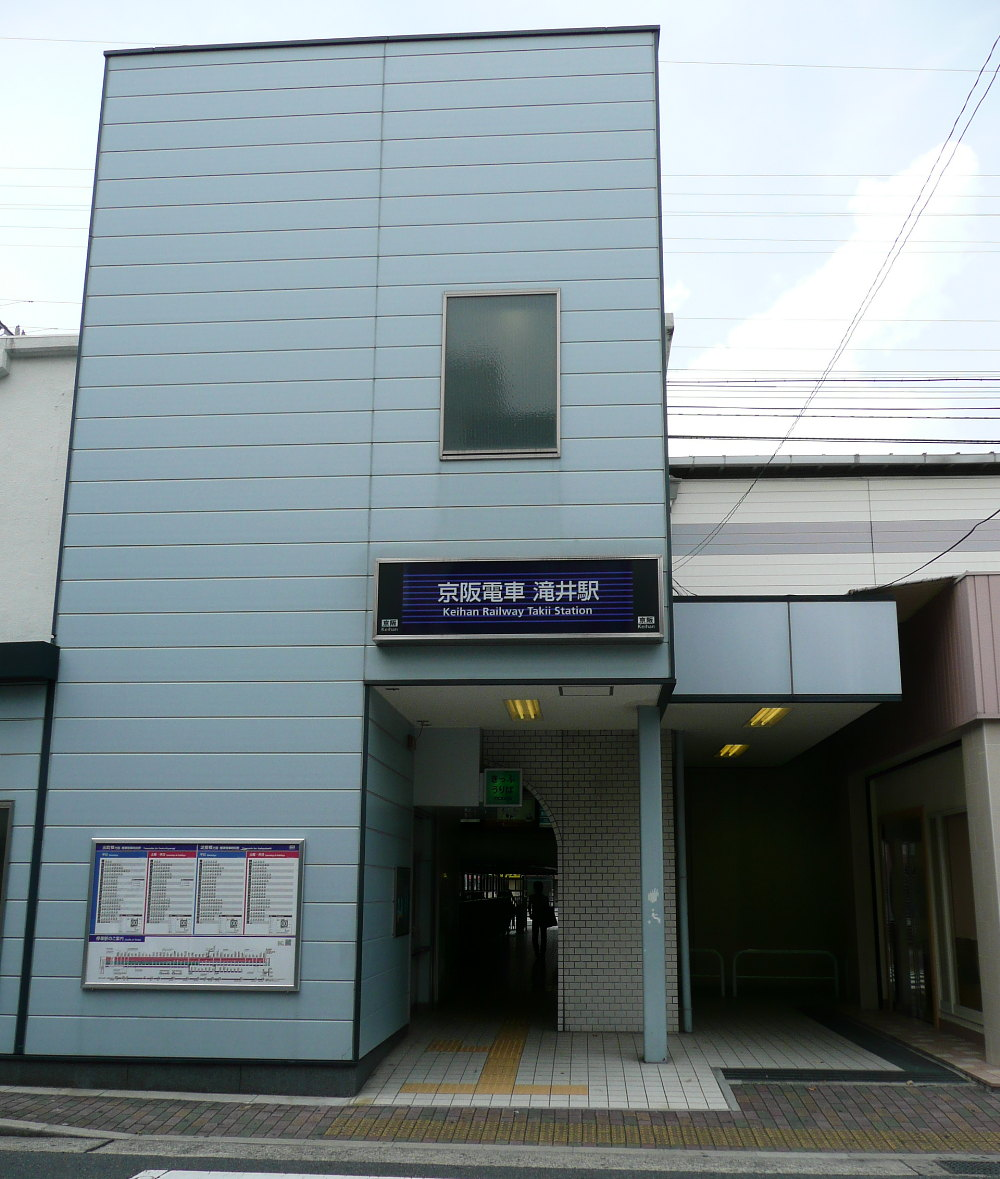
- Takii Station east entrance, August 2007

General information
- Location: 8-8 Beniyacho, Moriguchi-shi, Osaka-fu; Japan
- Coordinates: 34°43′39.66″N 135°33′26.97″E
- Operator: Keihan Electric Railway
- Line: ■ Keihan Main Line
- Distance: 7.2 km from Yodoyabashi
- Platforms: 2 side platforms
- Connections: Bus terminal

Other information
- Status: Staffed
- Station code: KH09
- Website: Official website

History
- Opened: 14 October 1931

Passengers
- FY2019: 6,814 daily
Location
- Location within Osaka Prefecture Location within Japan

Takii Station (滝井駅, Takii-eki) is a passenger railway station in located in the city of Moriguchi, Osaka Prefecture, Japan, operated by the private railway company Keihan Electric Railway.

== Lines ==
Takii Station is served by the Keihan Main Line, and is located 7.2 km from the starting point of the line at Yodoyabashi Station.

== Station layout ==
The station has two elevated side platforms, serving 4 tracks with the station building underneath.The middle two tracks are for express trains passing through the station

=== Platforms ===
1	■ Keihan Main Line	for Kayashima, Hirakatashi, Sanjō and Demachiyanagi
2	■ Keihan Main Line	for Kyōbashi, and Yodoyabashi

== Adjacent stations ==
«	Service	»
Keihan Main Line
Sembayashi	Local	Doi
Others: Does not stop at this station

== History ==
The station was opened on October 14, 1931.

== Passenger statistics ==
In fiscal 2019, the station was used by an average of 6,814 passengers daily.

== Surrounding area ==
- Kansai Medical University Medical Center
- Osaka International Takii High School
- Moriguchi City Takai Elementary School

== See also ==
- List of railway stations in Japan
