= Doi Station (Osaka) =

Railway station in Moriguchi, Osaka Prefecture, Japan

Doi Station 土居駅
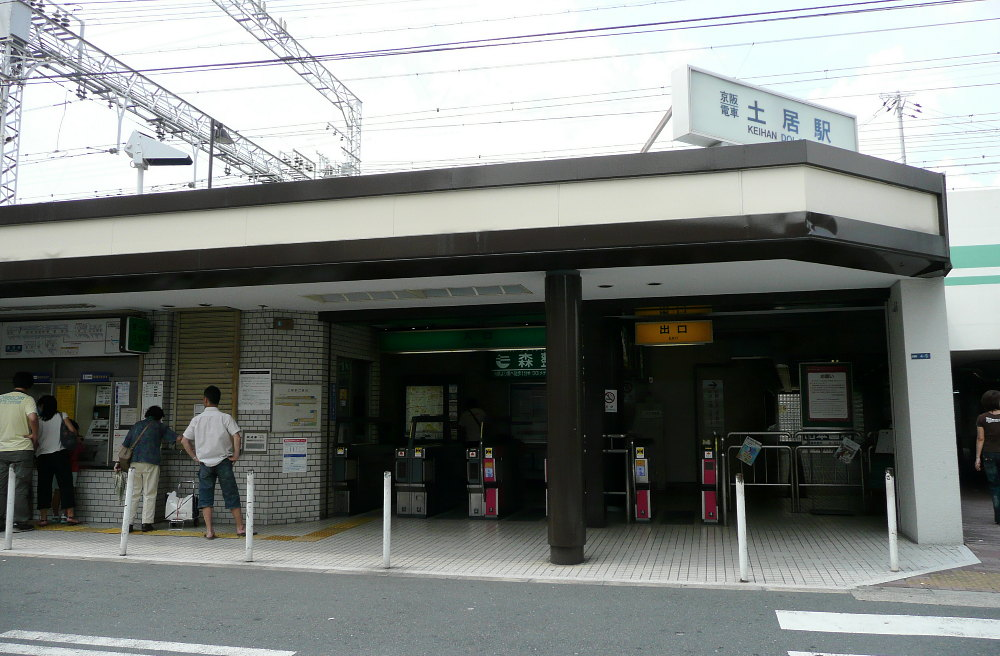
- Doi Station, August 2007

General information
- Location: 4 Fumizonochō, Moriguchi-shi, Osaka-fu 570-0074; Japan
- Coordinates: 34°43′50.94″N 135°33′36.74″E
- Operator: Keihan Electric Railway
- Line: ■ Keihan Main Line
- Distance: 7.6 km from Yodoyabashi
- Platforms: 2 side platforms
- Connections: Bus terminal

Other information
- Status: Staffed
- Station code: KH10
- Website: Official website

History
- Opened: 14 June 1932

Passengers
- FY2019: 5,677 daily
Location
- Location within Osaka Prefecture Location within Japan

Doi Station (土居駅 (Doi-eki)) is a passenger railway station in located in the city of Moriguchi, Osaka Prefecture, Japan, operated by the private railway company Keihan Electric Railway.

== Lines ==
Doi Station is served by the Keihan Main Line, and is located 7.6 km from the starting point of the line at Yodoyabashi Station.

== Station layout ==
The station has two elevated side platforms, serving 4 tracks with the station building underneath. The middle two tracks are for express trains passing through the station

=== Platforms ===
1	■ Keihan Main Line	for Kayashima, Hirakatashi, Sanjō and Demachiyanagi
2	■ Keihan Main Line	for Kyōbashi, and Yodoyabashi

== Adjacent stations ==
«	Service	»
Keihan Main Line
Takii	Local	Moriguchishi
Others: Does not stop at this station

== History ==
The station was opened on June 14, 1932

== Passenger statistics ==
In fiscal 2019, the station was used by an average of 5,677 passengers daily.

== Surrounding area ==
- Keihan Higashidori Shopping Street
- Morii Jinja
- Moriguchi Municipal Third Junior High School
- Moriguchi City Kasuga Elementary School

== See also ==
- List of railway stations in Japan
