= Nishisansō Station =

Railway station in Kadoma, Osaka Prefecture, Japan

Nishisansō Station 西三荘駅
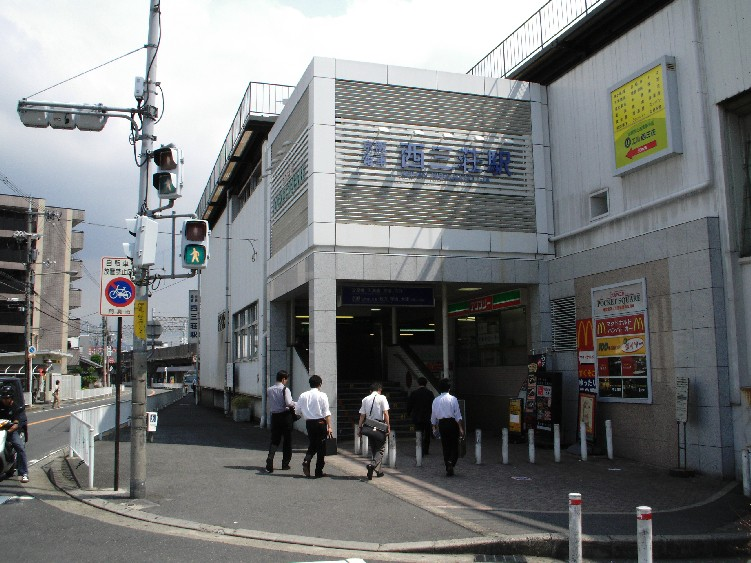
- Nishisansō Station, September 2006

General information
- Location: 26-22 Motomachi, Kadoma-shi, Osaka-fu; Japan
- Coordinates: 34.7373°N 135.5760°E
- Operator: Keihan Electric Railway
- Line: ■ Keihan Main Line
- Distance: 9.4 km from Yodoyabashi
- Platforms: 2 side platforms

Other information
- Status: Staffed
- Station code: KH12
- Website: Official website

History
- Opened: 23 March 1975

Passengers
- FY2019: 22,713 daily
Location
- Location within Osaka Prefecture Location within Japan

Nishisansō Station (西三荘駅, Nishisansō-eki) is a passenger railway station in located in the city of Kadoma, Osaka Prefecture, Japan, operated by the private railway company Keihan Electric Railway.

== Lines ==
Nishisansō Station is served by the Keihan Main Line, and is located 9.4 km from the starting point of the line at Yodoyabashi Station.

== Station layout ==
The station has two elevated side side platforms, with the station building underneath.

== Platforms ==
1	■ Keihan Main Line	for Kayashima, Hirakatashi, Sanjō and Demachiyanagi
2	■ Keihan Main Line	for Moriguchishi, Kyōbashi, and Yodoyabashi

== Adjacent stations ==
«	Service	»
Keihan Main Line
Rapid Limited Express for Demachiyanagi (快速特急): Does not stop at this station
Limited Express (特急): Does not stop at this station
Commuter Rapid Express for Nakanoshima (通勤快急): Does not stop at this station
Rapid Express (快速急行): Does not stop at this station
Midnight Express for Kuzuha (深夜急行): Does not stop at this station
Express (急行): Does not stop at this station
Commuter Sub Express for Yodoyabashi or Nakanoshima (通勤準急): Does not stop at this station
Sub Express (準急): Does not stop at this station
Moriguchishi	Semi-Express (区間急行)	Kadomashi
Moriguchishi	Local (普通)	Kadomashi

== History ==
The station was opened on March 23, 1975

== Passenger statistics ==
In fiscal 2019, the station was used by an average of 22,713 passengers daily (boarding passengers only).

== Surrounding area ==
- Panasonic headquarters
- Panasonic Museum Konosuke Matsushita History Museum
