= Sembayashi Station =

Railway station in Osaka, Japan

Sembayashi Station 千林駅
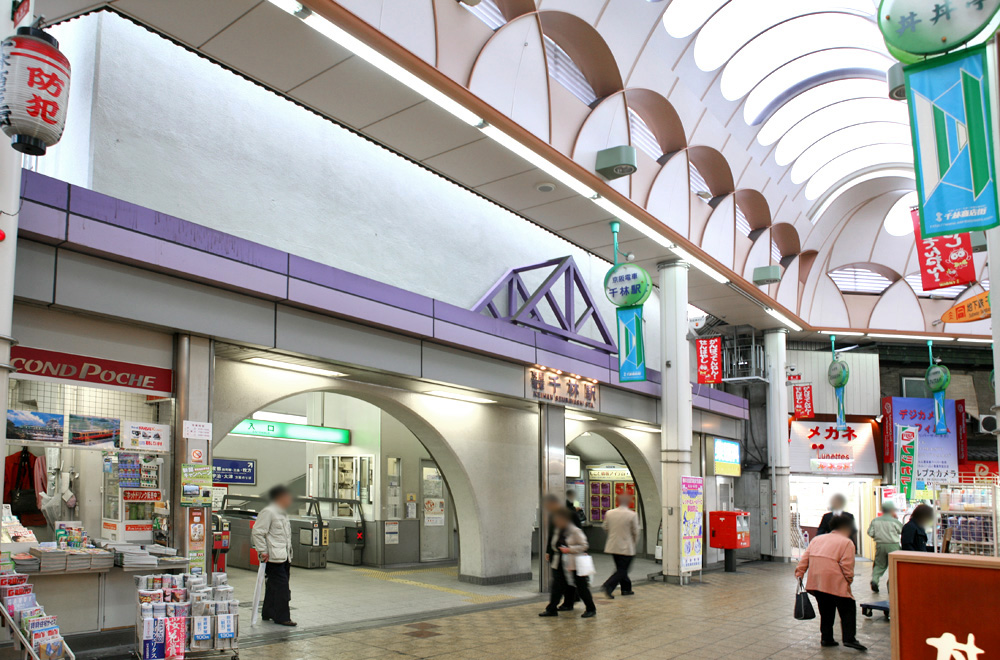
- Entrance of the station

General information
- Location: Sembayashi Itchome, Asahi, Osaka, Osaka （大阪市旭区千林一丁目） Japan
- Coordinates: 34°43′27.2″N 135°33′18.4″E
- Operator: Keihan Electric Railway
- Line: Keihan Main Line
- Connections

History
- Opened: 1910

Passengers
- 10,686 daily
Location

Sembayashi Station (千林駅, Senbayashi-eki) is a train station on the Keihan Electric Railway Keihan Main Line located in Asahi-ku, Osaka, Osaka Prefecture, Japan.

Opened in 1910, the station is famous for its long covered shopping street known as the Sembayashi Shōtengai. The shopping street also has a theme song that can be heard as one walks along the covered part of the street. Sembayashi-Ōmiya Station can be found at the other end of the shopping street.

The first Daiei store opened near this station. Some of the favorite stores have been the Kadoya Ice Cream Parlor, a popular hangout for students of the nearby high school.

== Layout ==
- The station has 2 side platforms serving a track each on the 2nd level, outside of the inner tracks.

1	■ Keihan Line	for Moriguchishi, Hirakatashi, Sanjo and Demachiyanagi
2	■ Keihan Line	for Kyobashi, Yodoyabashi and Nakanoshima

== Adjacent stations ==
«	Service	»
Keihan Main Line
Morishōji	Local	Takii
Others: Does not stop at this station
