= Morishōji Station =

Railway station in Osaka, Japan

Morishōji Station 森小路駅
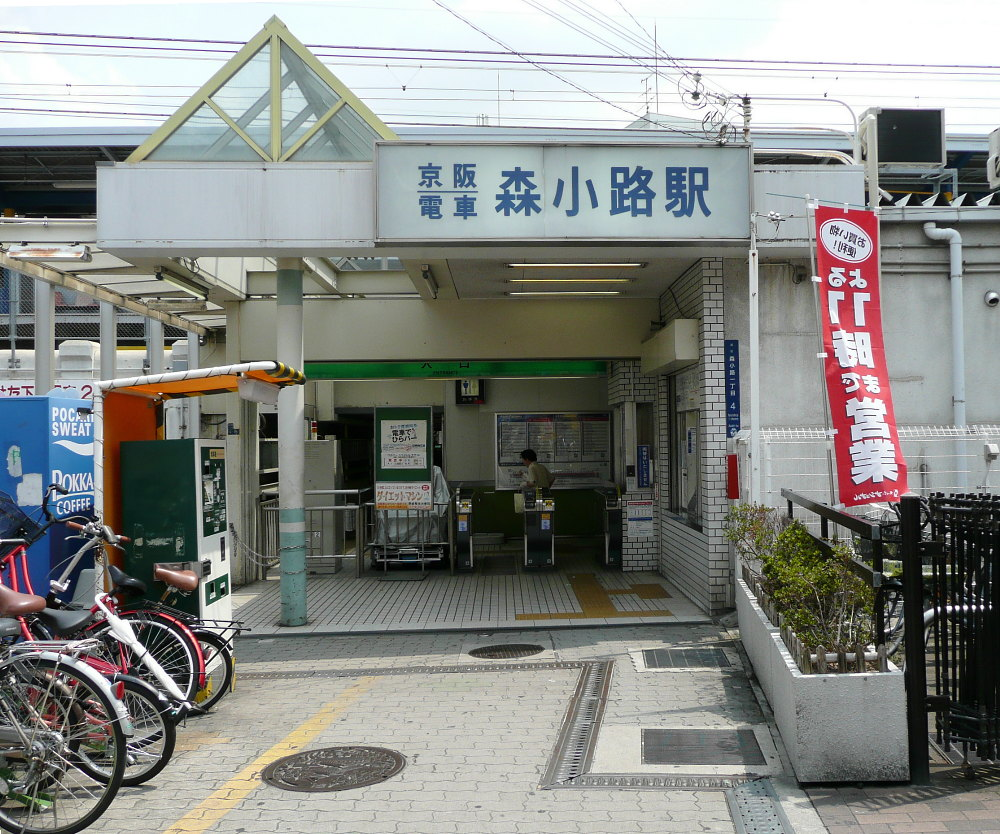
- Morishōji Station, August 2007

General information
- Location: Morishoji Itchome, Asahi, Osaka, Osaka （大阪市旭区森小路一丁目） Japan
- Coordinates: 34°43′10.53″N 135°33′5.63″E
- Operator: Keihan Electric Railway
- Line: Keihan Main Line
- Connections

History
- Opened: 1931
- Former names: Shin-Morishoji (until 1942)
Location

Morishōji Station (森小路駅, Morishōji-eki) is a train station on the Keihan Railway Keihan Main Line located in Asahi-ku, Osaka, Osaka Prefecture, Japan.

== Layout ==
- The station has 2 island platforms serving 2 tracks each on the 2nd level. The inner tracks are fenced because only local trains stop at this station.

1	■ Keihan Line	for Moriguchishi, Hirakatashi, Sanjo and Demachiyanagi
2	■ Keihan Line	for Kyobashi, Yodoyabashi and Nakanoshima

== Adjacent stations ==
«	Service	»
Keihan Main Line
Sekime	Local	Sembayashi
Others: Does not stop at this station
