= Neyagawashi Station =

Railway station in Neyagawa, Osaka Prefecture, Japan

Neyagawashi Station 寝屋川市駅
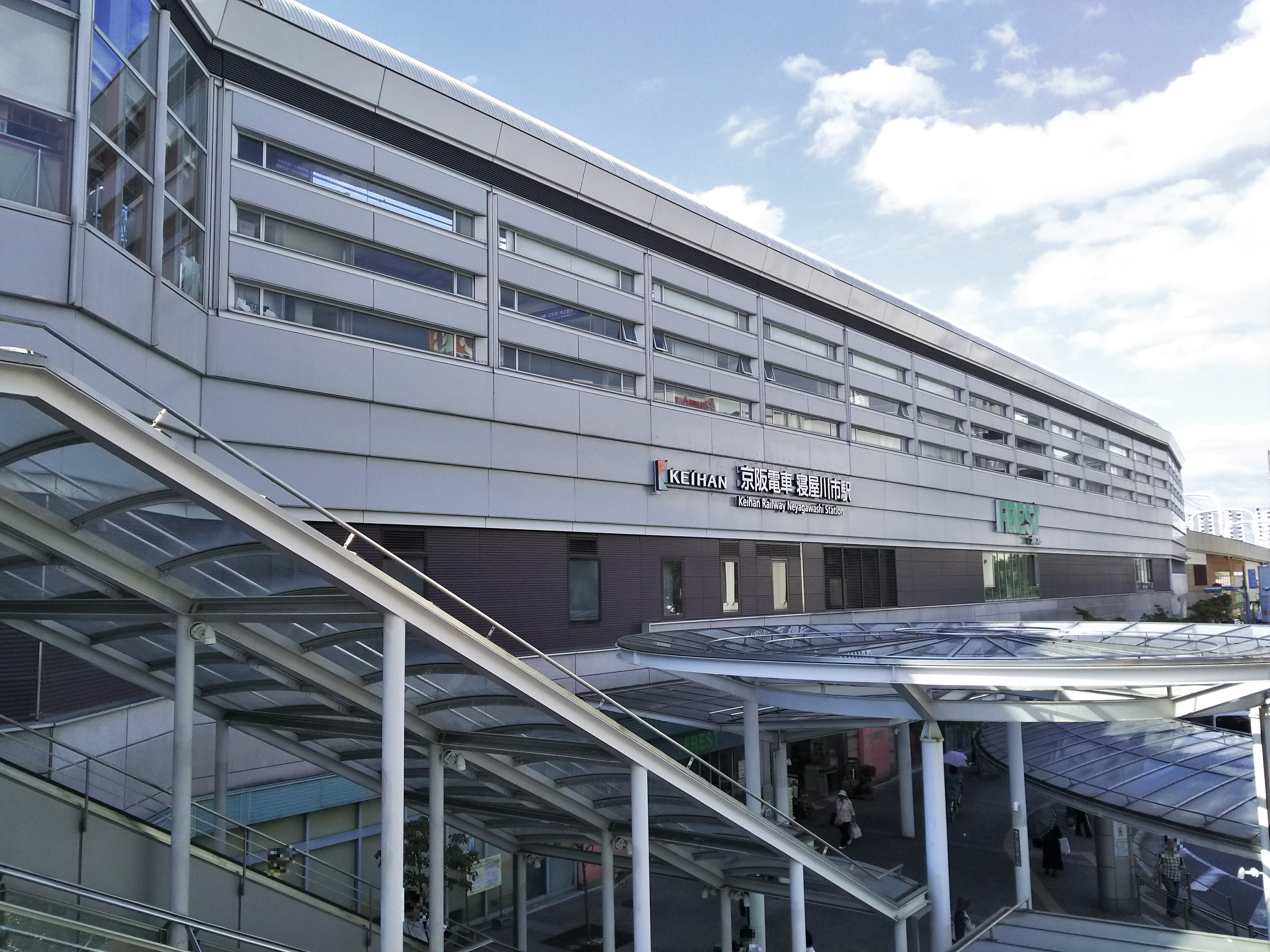
- Neyagawashi Station, August 2016

General information
- Location: 16-11 Hayakocho, Neyagawa-shi, Osaka-fu; Japan
- Coordinates: 34.763919°N 135.620792°E
- Operator: Keihan Electric Railway
- Line: ■ Keihan Main Line
- Distance: 15.0 km from Yodoyabashi
- Platforms: 2 side platforms
- Connections: Bus terminal

Construction
- Structure type: Elevated
- Accessible: Yes

Other information
- Status: Staffed
- Station code: KH17
- Website: Official website

History
- Opened: 15 April 1910
- Former names: Neyagawa (until 1951)

Passengers
- FY2019: 64,411 daily
Location
- Location within Osaka Prefecture Location within Japan

Neyagawashi Station (寝屋川市駅, Neyagawashi-eki) is a passenger railway station in located in the city of Neyagawa, Osaka Prefecture, Japan, operated by the private railway company Keihan Electric Railway.

== Lines ==
Neyagawashi Station is served by the Keihan Main Line, and is located 15.0 km from the starting point of the line at Yodoyabashi Station.

== Station layout ==
The station has two opposed elevated side platforms with the station building underneath. The platforms can accommodate trains of up to eight carriages in length.

== Platforms ==
| 1 | ■ Keihan Main Line | for Kayashima, Hirakatashi, Sanjō and Demachiyanagi |
| 2 | ■ Keihan Main Line | for Moriguchishi, Kyōbashi, Yodoyabashi and Nakanoshima |

== Adjacent stations ==
| « | Service | » |
Keihan Railway Keihan Main Line
Rapid Limited Express for Demachiyanagi (快速特急, in the evening on weekdays): Does not stop at this station
Limited Express (特急): Does not stop at this station
| Kyōbashi | Commuter Rapid Express for Nakanoshima (通勤快急, in the morning on weekdays) | Kōrien |
| Moriguchishi | Rapid Express (快速急行) | Kōrien |
| Kyōbashi | Midnight Express for Kuzuha (深夜急行) | Kōrien |
| Moriguchishi | Express (急行) | Kōrien |
| Kayashima | Commuter Sub Express for Yodoyabashi or Nakanoshima (通勤準急, in the morning on weekdays) | Kōrien |
| Kayashima | Sub Express (準急) | Kōrien |
| Kayashima | Semi-Express (区間急行) | Kōrien |
| Kayashima | Local (普通) | Kōrien |

== History ==
The station was opened on April 15, 1910 as Neyagawa Station (寝屋川駅). It was renamed on August 20, 1951.

== Passenger statistics ==
In fiscal 2019, the station was used by an average of 64,411 passengers daily.

== Surrounding area ==
- Neyagawa City Hall
- Neyagawa Civic Center
- Osaka Prefectural Neyagawa High School
- Neyagawa City Chuo Elementary School
