= Sembayashi-Omiya Station =

Metro station in Osaka, Japan

Coordinates: 34.7240°N 135.5491°E

Sembayashi-Omiya Station 千林大宮駅
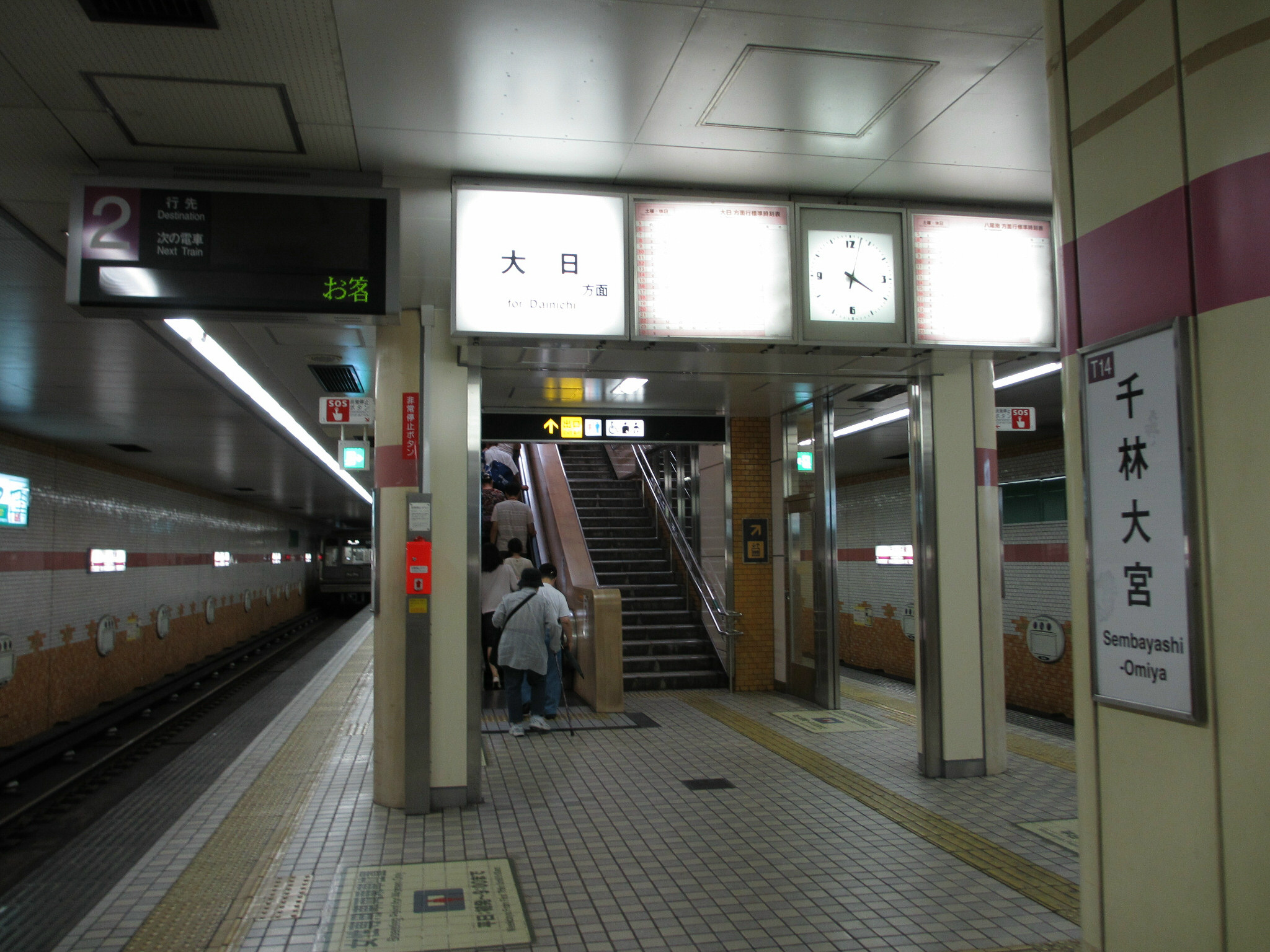
- Tanimachi-Line Senbayashiomiya Station platform

General information
- Location: Asahi Ward, Osaka, Osaka Prefecture; Japan
- System: Osaka Metro
- Operator: Osaka Metro
- Line: Tanimachi Line
- Platforms: 1 island platform
- Tracks: 2
- Connections: Keihan Electric Railway (Sembayashi)

Construction
- Structure type: Underground

Other information
- Station code: T 14

History
- Opened: 6 April 1977; 49 years ago

Passengers
- FY2016: 16,044 daily

Services
Preceding station	Osaka Metro	Following station
Taishibashi-Imaichi T 13 towards Dainichi	Tanimachi Line	Sekime-Takadono T 15 towards Yaominami
Location
- Location within Osaka Prefecture Location within Japan

Sembayashi-Omiya Station (千林大宮駅, Senbayashi-Ōmiya-eki; Station Number: T14) is a metro station on the Osaka Metro Tanimachi Line located in Asahi-ku, Osaka, Japan.

== Layout ==
- There is an island platform with two tracks underground.

1	■ Tanimachi Line	for Higashi-Umeda, Tennoji and Yaominami
2	■ Tanimachi Line	for Dainichi

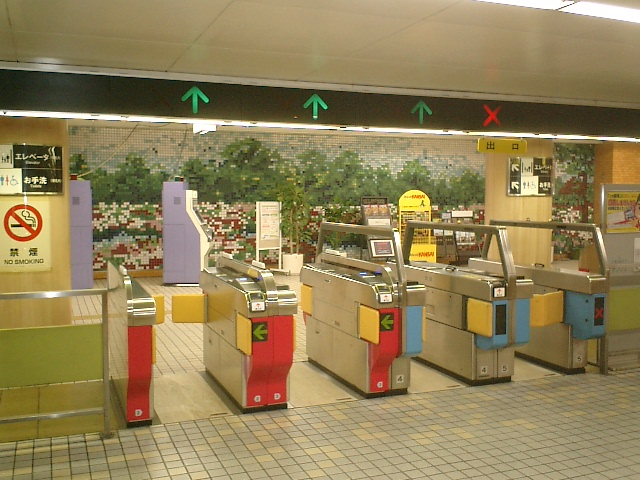
Fare gates

== Connections ==
- Asahi Ward Office
- Osaka City Arts Center
- Johoku Park
- Asahi Ward Health and Welfare Center
- Osaka Asahi Post Office
- Asahi Senbayashi Post Office
- Asahi Municipal Library
- Keihan Main Line Sembayashi Station
- Omiya Shrine
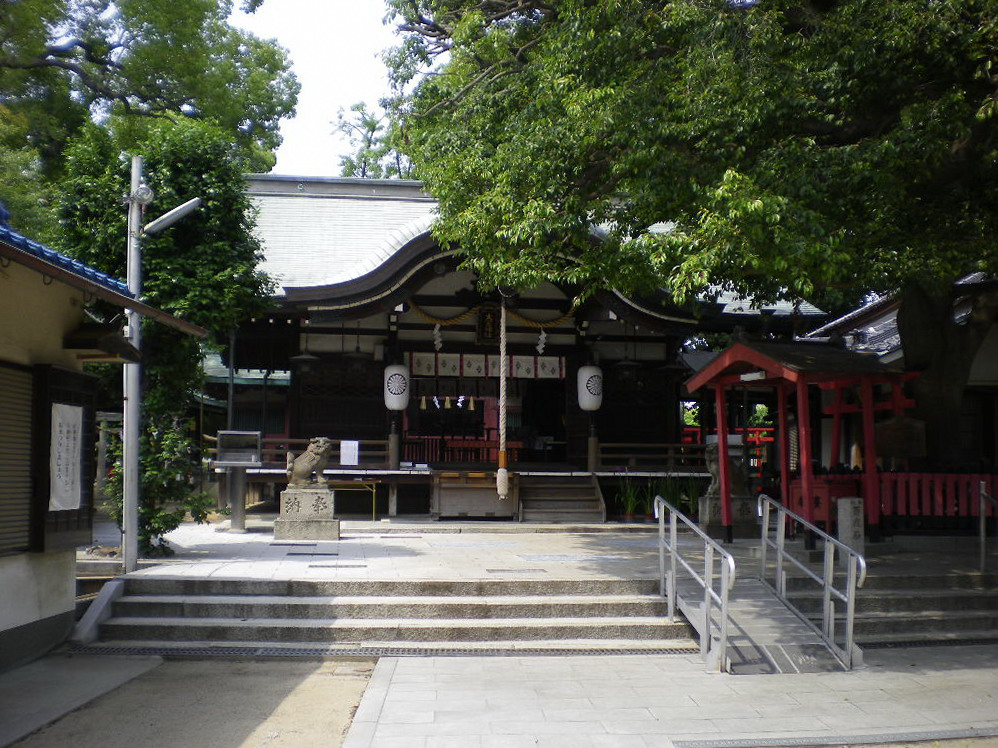
Omiya Shrine in Osaka
