= Jingū-Marutamachi Station =

Railway station in Kyoto, Japan

Coordinates: 35°1′3.61″N 135°46′19.78″E

Jingū-Marutamachi Station 神宮丸太町駅
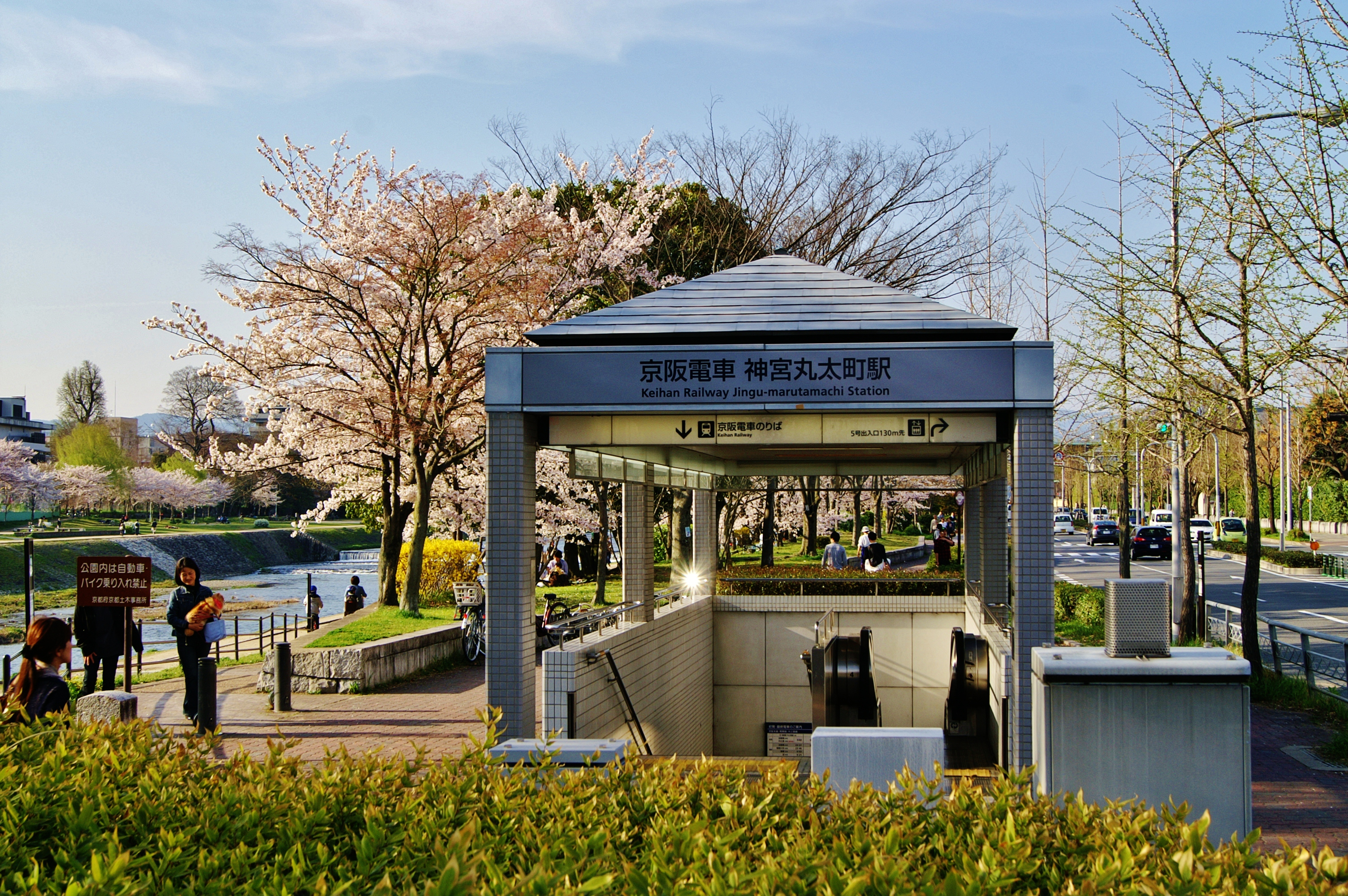
- Entrance of the station

General information
- Location: Sakyō, Kyoto, Kyoto; Japan
- Operator: Keihan Railway
- Line: Ōtō Line

History
- Opened: 1989; 37 years ago
- Former names: Marutamachi (until 2008)

Passengers
- FY2015: 3.9 million
Location

Jingū-Marutamachi Station (神宮丸太町駅) is a railway station on the Keihan Ōtō Line located in Sakyō-ku, Kyoto, Japan.

The station was named after Marutamachi Street as it is located where the railway beneath Kawabata Street crosses Marutamachi Street, and Heian Shrine (Heian Jingū) along Marutamachi Street. This is the second station along Marutamachi Street named Marutamachi; Marutamachi Station is on the Karasuma Line subway.

== Trains served ==
Local, sub-express and express trains of the Ōtō Line, most of which continue to the Keihan Main Line, stop at the station while rapid express trains and limited express trains pass.

«	Service	»
Ōtō Line
Sanjō	Local	Demachiyanagi
Sanjō	Sub Express; Commuter Sub Express (only running for Yodoyabashi or Nakanoshima on weekday mornings)	Demachiyanagi
Sanjō	Express	Demachiyanagi
Rapid Express: Does not stop at this station
Commuter Rapid Express (only running for Nakanoshima on weekday mornings): Does not stop at this station
Limited Express: Does not stop at this station

== Layout ==
The station in a double track section has one underground island platform with two tracks. Stairs, escalators and elevators connect the platform on the second basement to the first basement concourse and then to the ground level.

== History ==
The station opened on October 5, 1989, when the Ōtō Line started operation.

The station was renamed from Marutamachi Station (丸太町駅, Marutamachi-eki) on October 19, 2008, the date of opening of the Nakanoshima Line.
