= Keihan Main Line =

Railway line in Japan

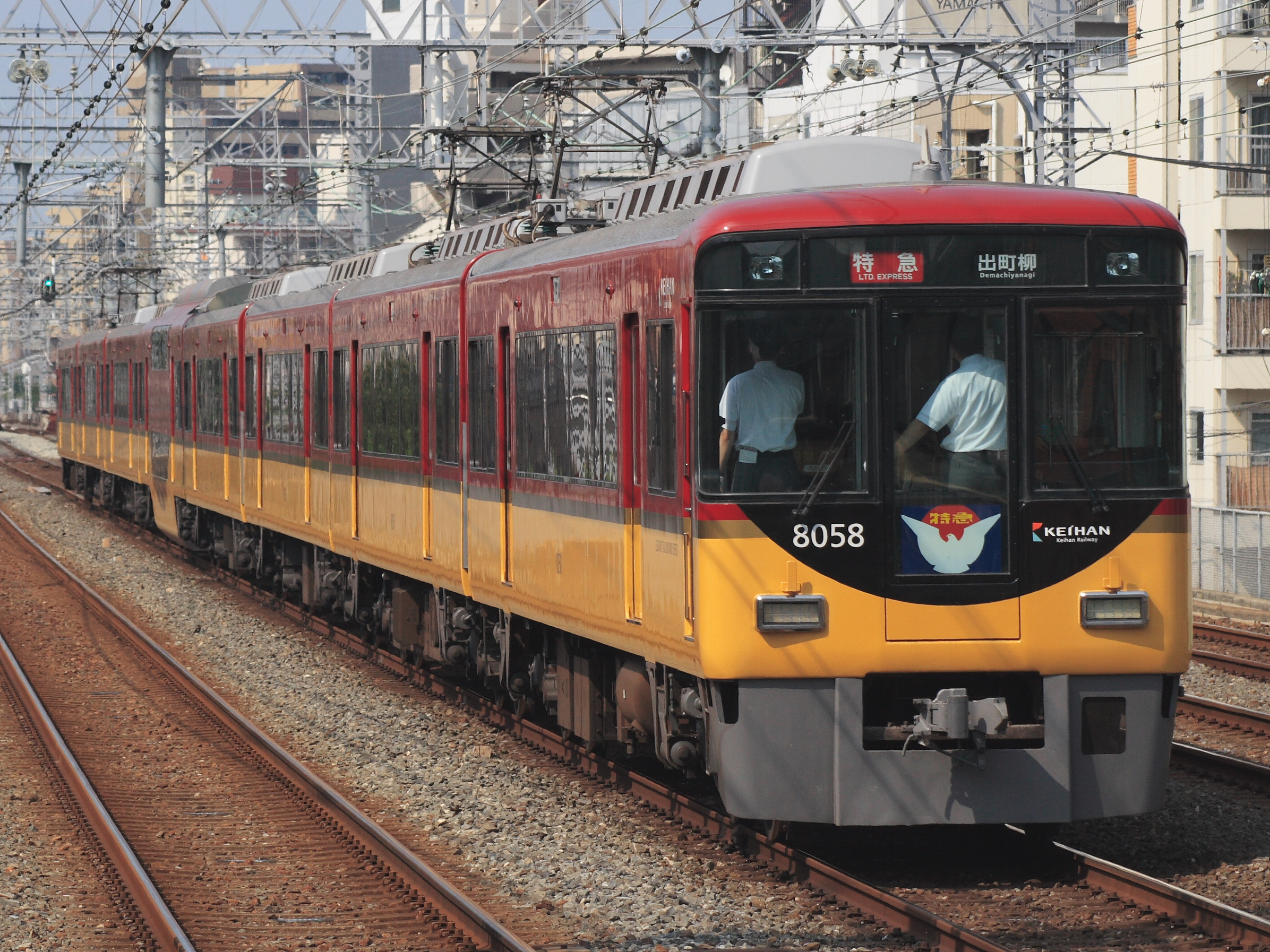
- A Keihan 8000 series limited express in revised color scheme

Overview
- Native name: 京阪本線
- Owner: Keihan Electric Railway
- Locale: Osaka Prefecture, Kyoto Prefecture
- Termini: Yodoyabashi; Sanjō

Service
- Depot(s): Neyagawa, Yodo

History
- Opened: April 15, 1910; 115 years ago

Technical
- Line length: 49.3 km (30.6 mi)
- Number of tracks: 2 (Yodoyabashi - Temmabashi, Neyagawashi - Sanjo); 4 (Temmabashi - Neyagawashi)
- Track gauge: 1,435 mm (4 ft 8 1/2 in)
- Electrification: 1,500 V DC, overhead catenary
- Operating speed: 110 km/h (70 mph)

The Keihan Main Line (京阪本線, Keihan-honsen) is a railway line in Japan operated by Keihan Electric Railway. The line runs between Sanjō Station in Kyoto and Yodoyabashi Station in Osaka. There are through services to the Keihan Ōtō Line and the Keihan Nakanoshima Line. Trains from Kyoto to Osaka are treated as "down" trains, and from Osaka to Kyoto as "up" trains.

== Train services ==
As of March 2025, the following services are operated.

Liner (ライナー, Liner) (Ln)
All cars reserved seating. Trains run "down" in the morning, and "up" in the evening. Weekdays Only.
Rapid Limited Express "Rakuraku" (快速特急"洛楽", Kaisoku Tokkyū "Rakuraku") (RLE)
Premium car is reserved seating only
Limited Express (特急, Tokkyū) (LE)
Premium car is reserved seating only
Commuter Rapid Express (通勤快急, Tsūkin Kaikyū) (CRE) - "down" trains only, on weekday mornings
Rapid Express (快速急行, Kaisoku Kyūkō) (RE) - premium car is reserved seating
Express (急行, Kyūkō) (Ex)
Commuter Sub-express (通勤準急, Tsūkin Junkyū) (CSbE) - "down" trains only, on weekday mornings
Trains are operated from Demachiyanagi, Kuzuha, Hirakatashi to Yodoyabashi or Nakanoshima in the morning and pass Moriguchishi.
Sub-express (準急, Junkyū) (SbE)
Semi-express (区間急行, Kukan Kyūkō) (SmE)
Local (普通, Futsū)
Trains stop at all stations.

Operation in non-rush hours per hour
Limited express: 5 round trips between Yodoyabashi and Demachiyanagi
Sub. express: 5 round trips between Yodoyabashi and Demachiyanagi
Local: 5 round trips between Nakanoshima and Kayashima,

== Stations ==
- S: Trains stop.
- s: limited stop
- |, ↑, ↓: Trains pass.
- ↑, ↓: Only one direction.
- ▼: Boarding only in "up" direction.
- ▲: Boarding only in "down" direction.
- (M): Stations using melodies composed by musician Minoru Mukaiya in train departure announcements.
- For train abbreviations, see above.

Station number	Station	Japanese	SmE	SbE	CSbE	Ex	ME	RE	CRE	LE	RLE	Ln	Transfers	Location	
Through section		from Temmabashi: L, SmE, SbE, CSbE, RE, CRE: to Nakanoshima on the Nakanoshima Line													
KH01	Yodoyabashi (M)	淀屋橋	S	S	S	S	S	S		S	S	▼	Keihan Nakanoshima Line (Ōebashi); Osaka Metro Midosuji Line	Chūō-ku, Osaka	Osaka Prefecture
KH02	Kitahama	北浜	S	S	S	S	S	S		S	S	▼	Keihan Nakanoshima Line (Naniwabashi); Osaka Metro Sakaisuji Line	Chūō-ku, Osaka	Osaka Prefecture
KH03	Temmabashi (M)	天満橋	S	S	S	S	S	S	S	S	S	▼	Keihan Nakanoshima Line; Osaka Metro Tanimachi Line	Chūō-ku, Osaka	Osaka Prefecture
KH04	Kyōbashi (M)	京橋	S	S	S	S	S	S	S	S	S	▼	JR West: O Osaka Loop Line; H Gakkentoshi Line (Katamachi Line); H JR Tōzai Line; Osaka Metro Nagahori Tsurumi-ryokuchi Line	Miyakojima-ku, Osaka	Osaka Prefecture
KH05	Noe	野江	|	|	↑	|	↓	|	↑	|	|	|	Osaka Metro Tanimachi Line (Noe-Uchindai); F JR West Osaka Higashi Line (JR-Noe)	Jōtō-ku, Osaka	Osaka Prefecture
KH06	Sekime	関目	|	|	↑	|	↓	|	↑	|	|	|	Osaka Metro Imazatosuji Line (Sekime-Seiiku)	Jōtō-ku, Osaka	Osaka Prefecture
KH07	Morishōji	森小路	|	|	↑	|	↓	|	↑	|	|	|		Asahi-ku, Osaka	Osaka Prefecture
KH08	Sembayashi	千林	|	|	↑	|	↓	|	↑	|	|	|		Asahi-ku, Osaka	Osaka Prefecture
KH09	Takii	滝井	|	|	↑	|	↓	|	↑	|	|	|		Moriguchi	Osaka Prefecture
KH10	Doi	土居	|	|	↑	|	↓	|	↑	|	|	|		Moriguchi	Osaka Prefecture
KH11	Moriguchi-shi (M)	守口市	S	S	↑	S	↓	S	↑	|	|	|		Moriguchi	Osaka Prefecture
KH12	Nishisansō	西三荘	S	|	↑	|	↓	|	↑	|	|	|		Kadoma	Osaka Prefecture
KH13	Kadoma-shi	門真市	S	|	↑	|	↓	|	↑	|	|	|	■ Osaka Monorail Main Line	Kadoma	Osaka Prefecture
KH14	Furukawabashi	古川橋	S	|	↑	|	↓	|	↑	|	|	|		Kadoma	Osaka Prefecture
KH15	Ōwada	大和田	S	|	↑	|	↓	|	↑	|	|	|		Kadoma	Osaka Prefecture
KH16	Kayashima (M)	萱島	S	S	S	|	↓	|	↑	|	|	|		Neyagawa	Osaka Prefecture
KH17	Neyagawashi	寝屋川市	S	S	S	S	S	S	S	|	|	s		Neyagawa	Osaka Prefecture
KH18	Kōrien (M)	香里園	S	S	S	S	S	S	S	|	|	s		Neyagawa	Osaka Prefecture
KH19	Kōzenji	光善寺	S	S	S	|	↓	|	↑	|	|	|		Hirakata	Osaka Prefecture
KH20	Hirakata-kōen	枚方公園	S	S	S	S	↓	|	↑	|	|	|		Hirakata	Osaka Prefecture
KH21	Hirakatashi (M)	枚方市	S	S	S	S	S	S	S	S	|	S	Keihan Katano Line	Hirakata	Osaka Prefecture
KH22	Gotenyama	御殿山	S	S	S	|	↓	|	↑	|	|	|		Hirakata	Osaka Prefecture
KH23	Makino	牧野	S	S	S	|	↓	|	↑	|	|	|		Hirakata	Osaka Prefecture
KH24	Kuzuha (M)	樟葉	S	S	S	S	S	S	S	S	|	S		Hirakata	Osaka Prefecture
KH25	Hashimoto	橋本		S	S	|		|	↑	|	|	|		Yawata	Kyoto Prefecture
KH26	Iwashimizu-hachimangū (M)	石清水八幡宮		S	S	S		|	↑	|	|	|	Keihan Cable Line (Cable-hachimangu-guchi)	Yawata	Kyoto Prefecture
KH27	Yodo (Kyoto Racecourse) (M)	淀 (京都競馬場)		S	S	s		|	↑	s	|	|		Fushimi-ku, Kyoto	Kyoto Prefecture
KH28	Chūshojima (M)	中書島		S	S	S		S	S	S	|	S	Keihan Uji Line	Fushimi-ku, Kyoto	Kyoto Prefecture
KH29	Fushimi-Momoyama	伏見桃山		S	S	|		|	↑	|	|	|		Fushimi-ku, Kyoto	Kyoto Prefecture
KH30	Tambabashi (M)	丹波橋		S	S	S		S	S	S	|	S	Kintetsu Kyoto Line (Kintetsu-Tambabashi)	Fushimi-ku, Kyoto	Kyoto Prefecture
KH31	Sumizome	墨染		S	S	|		|	↑	|	|	|		Fushimi-ku, Kyoto	Kyoto Prefecture
KH32	Fujinomori	藤森		S	S	|		|	↑	|	|	|		Fushimi-ku, Kyoto	Kyoto Prefecture
KH33	Ryūkokudai-mae-fukakusa (M)	龍谷大前深草		S	S	|		|	↑	|	|	|		Fushimi-ku, Kyoto	Kyoto Prefecture
KH34	Fushimi-Inari	伏見稲荷		S	S	S		|	↑	|	|	|		Fushimi-ku, Kyoto	Kyoto Prefecture
KH35	Toba-kaidō	鳥羽街道		S	S	|		|	↑	|	|	|		Higashiyama-ku, Kyoto	Kyoto Prefecture
KH36	Tōfukuji	東福寺		S	S	|		|	↑	|	|	|	D JR West Nara Line	Higashiyama-ku, Kyoto	Kyoto Prefecture
KH37	Shichijō	七条		S	S	S		S	S	S	S	▲		Higashiyama-ku, Kyoto	Kyoto Prefecture
KH38	Kiyomizu-Gojō	清水五条		S	S	S		|	↑	|	|	|		Higashiyama-ku, Kyoto	Kyoto Prefecture
KH39	Gion-Shijō	祇園四条		S	S	S		S	S	S	S	▲	Hankyu Kyoto Main Line (Kyoto-kawaramachi)	Higashiyama-ku, Kyoto	Kyoto Prefecture
KH40	Sanjō (M)	三条		S	S	S		S	S	S	S	▲	Kyoto Municipal Subway Tozai Line (Sanjō Keihan); Keihan Ōtō Line	Higashiyama-ku, Kyoto	Kyoto Prefecture
Keihan Ōtō Line															Kyoto Prefecture
KH41	Jingū-Marutamachi	神宮丸太町		S	S	S		|	|	|	|	|		Sakyō-ku, Kyoto	Kyoto Prefecture
KH42	Demachiyanagi (M)	出町柳		S	S	S		S	S	S	S	▲	Eizan Electric Railway Main Line	Sakyō-ku, Kyoto	Kyoto Prefecture

== Rolling stock ==
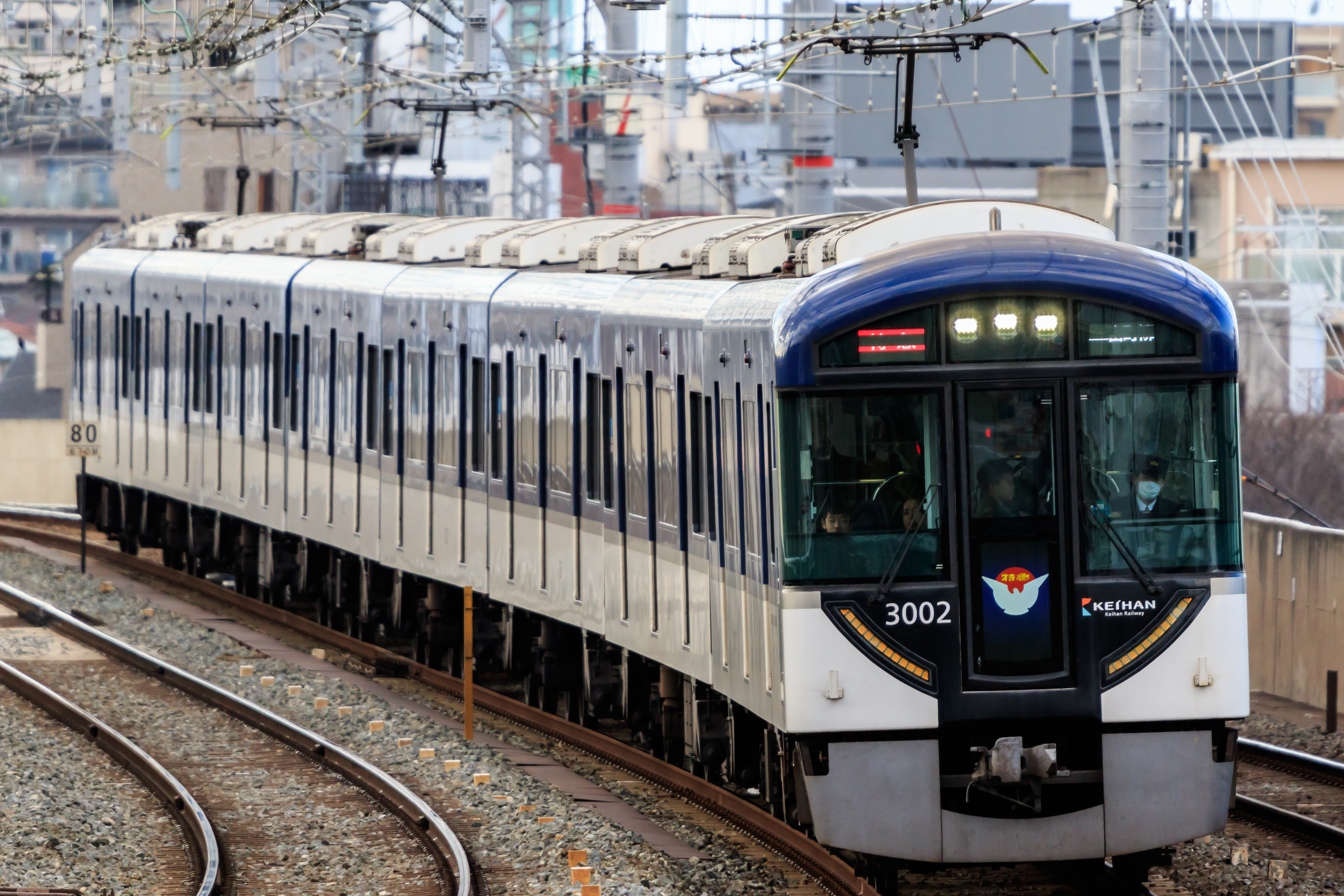
Keihan 3000 series express in January 2018

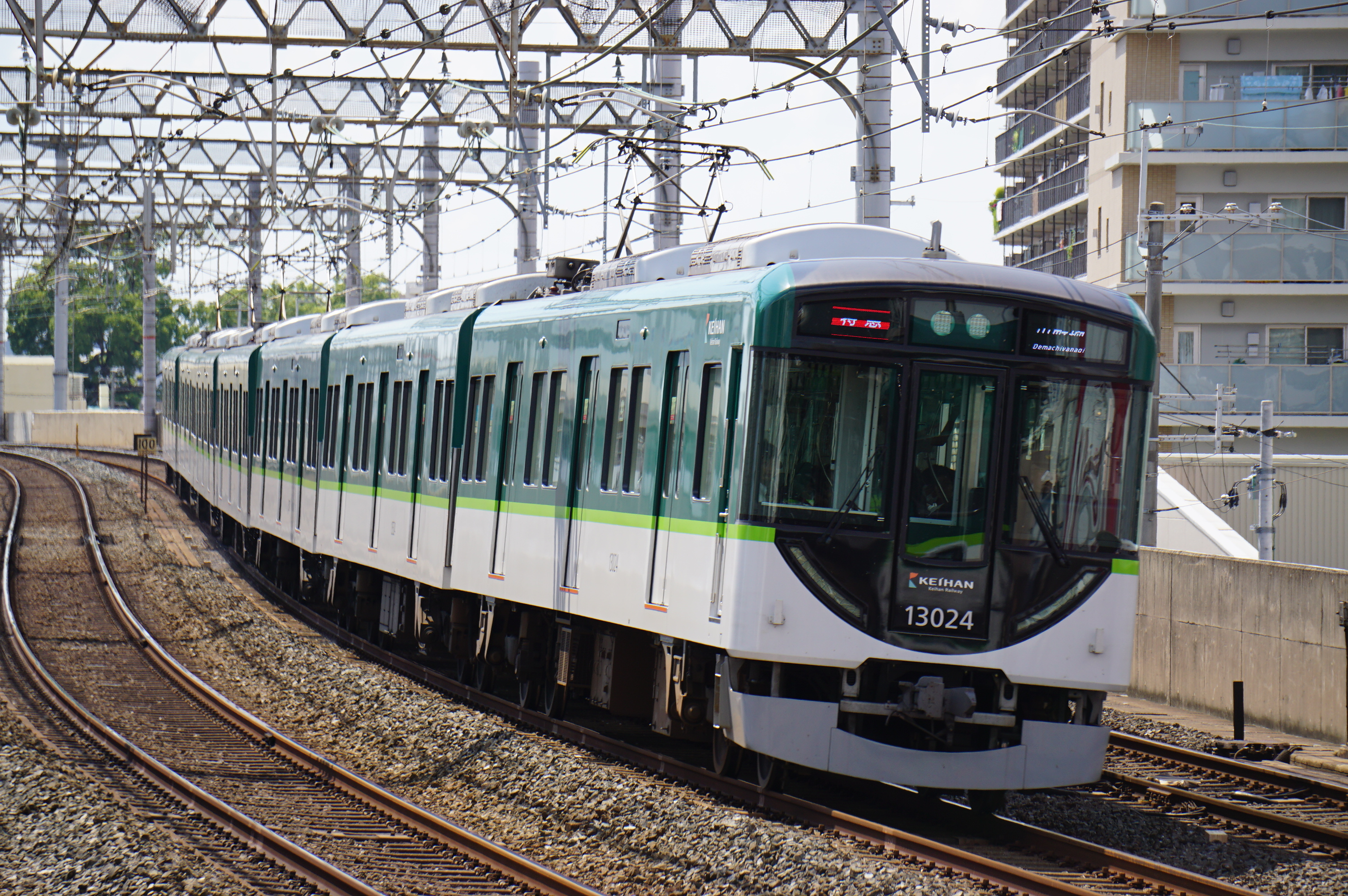
Keihan 13000 series express in August 2017

== History ==
The Temmabashi to Kiyomizu-Gojo section opened as dual track, electrified at 1,500 V DC, in 1910, and was extended to Sanjo in 1915. The Temmabashi to Yodoyabashi section opened in 1963.

The section from Temmabashi to Gamo Signal Box was quadruple-tracked and elevated in 1970. Quadruple-tracking and elevation was continued northwards, with the Doi to Neyagawa Signal Box section completed in 1982. In 1987, in Kyoto, the street-level section from Tōfukuji to Sanjo was replaced by a tunnel section, which was extended to the current terminus, Demachiyanagi, in 1989. Hirakatashi Station was elevated in 1993, Neyagawashi Station in 1999, and Yodo Station (along with the line section next to the new Yodo Depot) in 2011.

Works to elevate the remaining at-grade section between Neyagawashi Station and Hirakatashi Station, including Kōrien Station, Kozenji Station and Hirakata-kōen Station, began in September 2022. Preliminary works such as land acquisition had already been in progress since 2013. The project aims to eliminate 21 level crossings in the affected section, some of which are closed for up to 40 minutes per hour during the morning and afternoon rush hour. Work is expected to finish by 2027 with the transition of train services to the elevated tracks planned to be completed in 2028.

== See also ==
- List of railway lines in Japan
