= Moriguchishi Station =

Railway station in Moriguchi, Osaka Prefecture, Japan

Moriguchishi Station 守口市駅
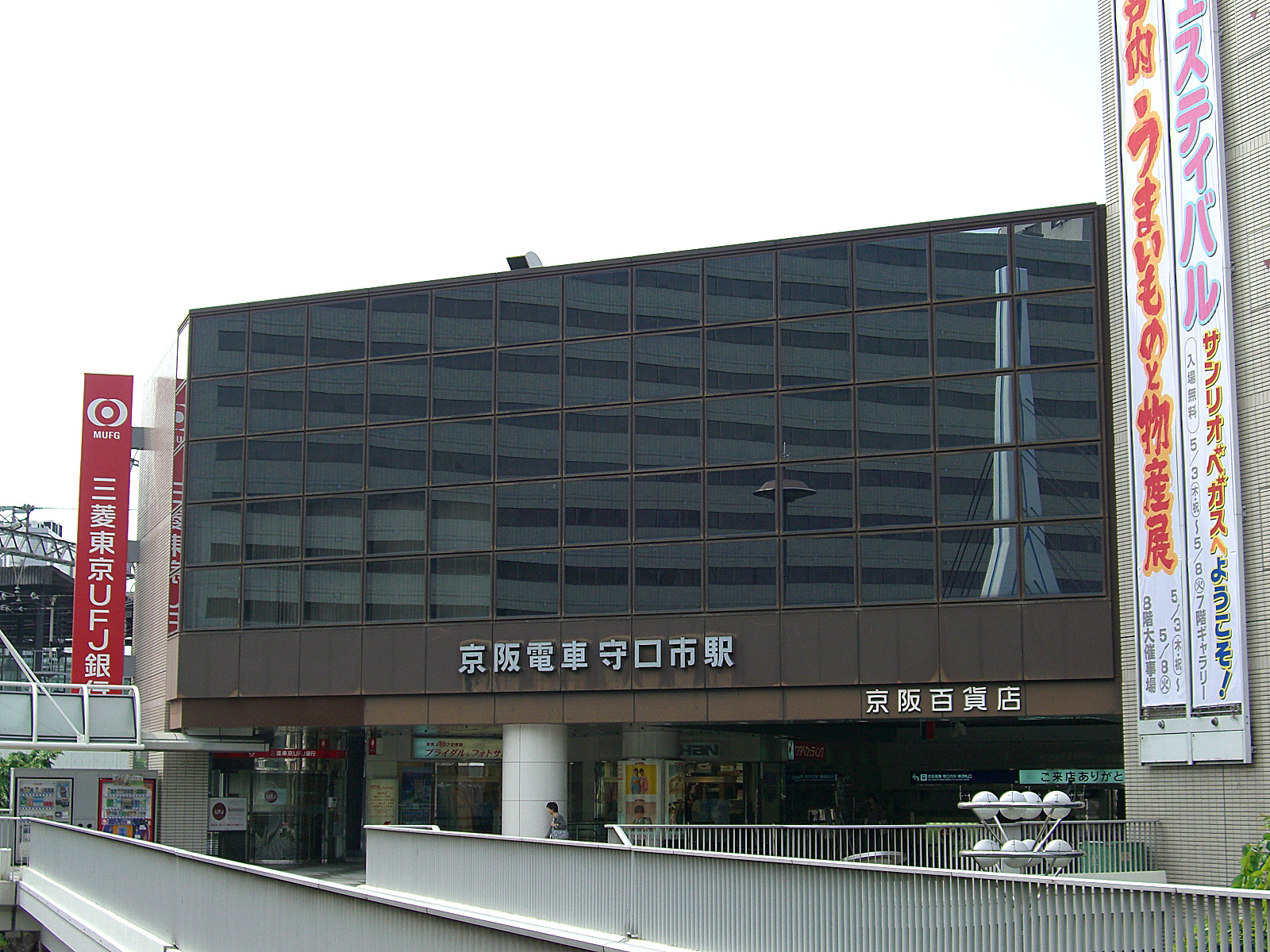
- Moriguchishi Station east gate, May 2007

General information
- Location: 2-1 Jinaichō, Moriguchi-shi, Osaka-fu 570-0056; Japan
- Coordinates: 34°44′07″N 135°33′55″E
- Operator: Keihan Electric Railway
- Line: ■ Keihan Main Line
- Distance: 8.3 km from Yodoyabashi
- Platforms: 2 island platforms
- Connections: Bus terminal

Other information
- Status: Staffed
- Station code: KH11
- Website: Official website

History
- Opened: 15 April 1910
- Former names: Moriguchi (until 1971)

Passengers
- FY2019: 36,161 daily
Location
- Location within Osaka Prefecture Location within Japan

Moriguchishi Station (守口市駅, Moriguchishi-eki) is a passenger railway station in located in the city of Moriguchi, Osaka Prefecture, Japan, operated by the private railway company Keihan Electric Railway.

== Lines ==
Moriguchi Station is served by the Keihan Main Line, and is located 8.3 km from the starting point of the line at Yodoyabashi Station.

== Station layout ==
The station has two elevated island platforms, serving 4 tracks on the 3rd level with the station building underneath.The ticket gates are located on the 2nd level in the west and the east.

=== Platforms ===
1, 2	■ Keihan Main Line	for Kayashima, Hirakatashi, Sanjō and Demachiyanagi
3, 4	■ Keihan Main Line	for Kyōbashi, and Yodoyabashi

== Adjacent stations ==
«	Service	»
Keihan Main Line
Doi	Local	Nishisansō
Kyōbashi	Semi-Express	Nishisansō
Kyōbashi	Sub Express	Kayashima
Commuter Sub Express for Yodoyabashi or Nakanoshima (on weekdays): Does not stop at this station
Kyōbashi	Express	Neyagawashi
Midnight Express for Kuzuha: Does not stop at this station
Kyōbashi	Rapid Express	Neyagawashi
Commuter Rapid Express for Nakanoshima (on weekdays): Does not stop at this station
Limited Express: Does not stop at this station
Rapid Limited Express for Demachiyanagi (on weekdays): Does not stop at this station

== History ==
The station was opened on April 15, 1910, as Moriguchi Station (守口駅). It was renamed on June 20, 1971.

== Passenger statistics ==
In fiscal 2019, the station was used by an average of 36,161 passengers daily.

== Surrounding area ==
- Keihan Department Store Moriguchi
- Sanyo Electric Co., Ltd.
- Moriguchi City Hall
- The Kansai Electric Power Company, Inc. Moriguchi Substation
- Keihan Railway Moriguchi Substation
- Moriguchi Station - Tanimachi Line
- Keihan Bus Station (6 stops)

== See also ==
- List of railway stations in Japan
