= Kayashima Station =

Railway station in Neyagawa, Osaka Prefecture, Japan

Kayashima Station 萱島駅
- Kayashima Station with the sacred tree growing through it

General information
- Location: 198-1, Kayashimahonmachi, Neyagawa-shi, Osaka-fu; Japan
- Coordinates: 34.7474°N 135.6113°E
- Operator: Keihan Electric Railway
- Line: ■ Keihan Main Line
- Distance: 12.8 km from Yodoyabashi
- Platforms: 2 island platforms
- Connections: Bus terminal

Other information
- Status: Staffed
- Station code: KH16
- Website: Official website

History
- Opened: 15 April 1910

Passengers
- FY2019: 27,841 daily
Location
- Location within Osaka Prefecture Location within Japan

Kayashima Station (萱島駅, Kayashima-eki) is a passenger railway station in located in the city of Neyagawa, Osaka Prefecture, Japan, operated by the private railway company Keihan Electric Railway. One notable feature of this station is that it has a large camphor sacred tree growing in the middle of it which is considered sacred to the local people. The station was built around it. The tree is estimated to be around 700 years old; its base has a small Shinto shrine.

== Lines ==
Kayashima Station is served by the Keihan Main Line, and is located 12.8 km from the starting point of the line at Yodoyabashi Station.

== Station layout ==
The station has two island platforms connected by an elevated station building.

== Platforms ==
1,2	■ Keihan Main Line	for Kayashima, Hirakatashi, Sanjō and Demachiyanagi
3, 4	■ Keihan Main Line	for Moriguchishi, Kyōbashi, Yodoyabashi and Nakanoshima

== Adjacent stations ==
«	Service	»
Keihan Main Line
Rapid Limited Express for Demachiyanagi (快速特急): Does not stop at this station
Limited Express (特急): Does not stop at this station
Commuter Rapid Express for Nakanoshima (通勤快急): Does not stop at this station
Rapid Express (快速急行): Does not stop at this station
Midnight Express for Kuzuha (深夜急行): Does not stop at this station
Express (急行): Does not stop at this station
Kyobashi	Commuter Sub Express for Yodoyabashi or Nakanoshima (通勤準急)	Neyagawashi
Moriguchishi	Sub Express (準急)	Neyagawashi
Ōwada	Semi-Express (区間急行)	Neyagawashi
Ōwada	Local (普通)	Neyagawashi

== History ==
The station was opened on April 15, 1910.

== Passenger statistics ==
In fiscal 2019, the station was used by an average of 27,841 passengers daily.

== Surrounding area ==
- Kayashima Shrine
- Kayashima Ikuno Hospital
