= Sanjō Station (Kyoto) =

Railway station in Kyoto, Japan

Sanjo Station 三条駅
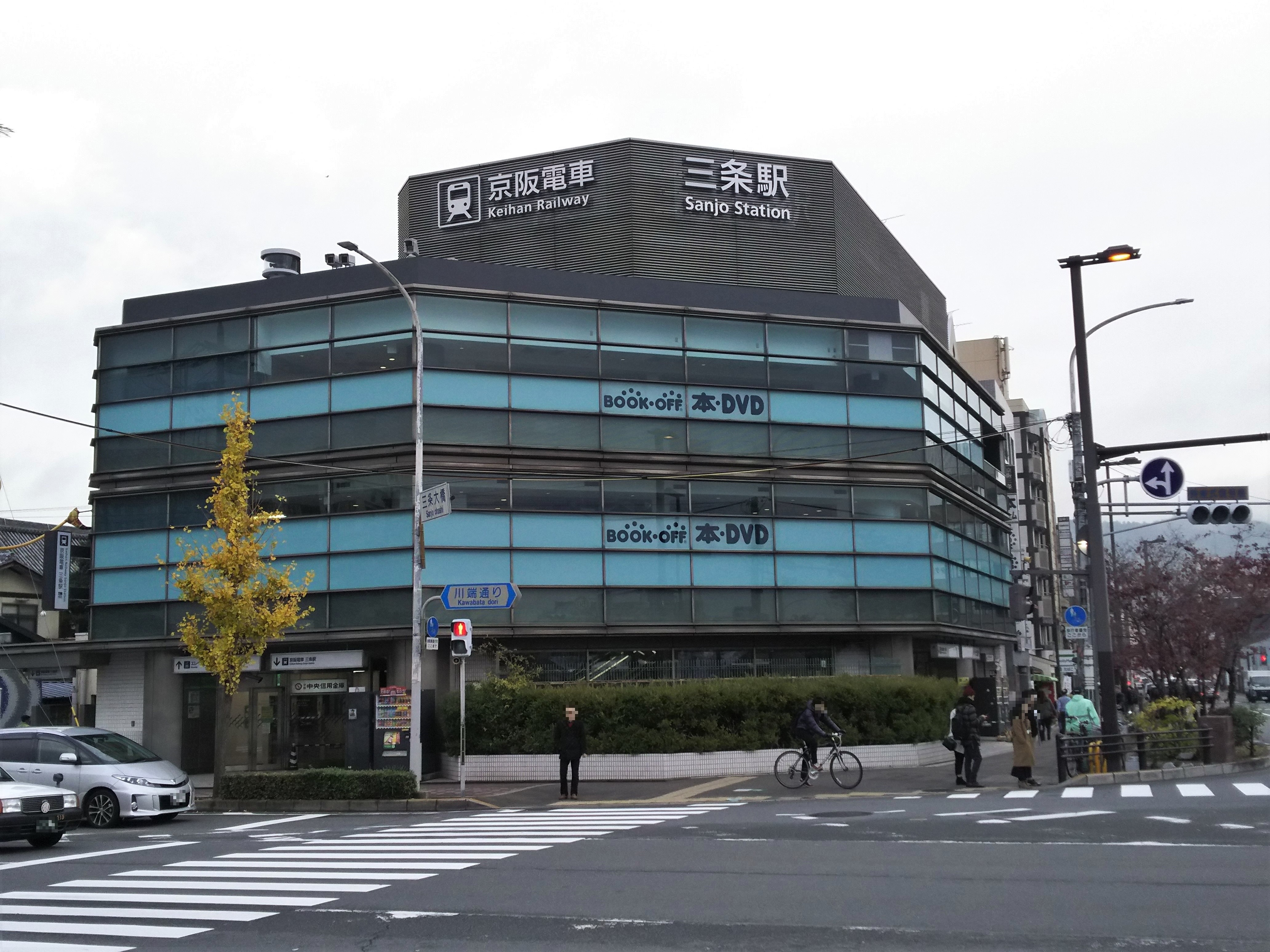
- Station building (railway facilities are underground)

General information
- Location: Gokencho, Higashiyama, Kyoto, Kyoto （京都市東山区五軒町） Japan
- Coordinates: 35°0′33″N 135°46′20″E
- Operator: Keihan Electric Railway
- Lines: Keihan Main Line; Oto Line
- Connections: Sanjō Keihan Station (Kyoto Subway Tōzai Line)

Other information
- Station code: KH40

History
- Opened: 1915; 111 years ago

Passengers
- FY 2023: 32,953 daily
Location

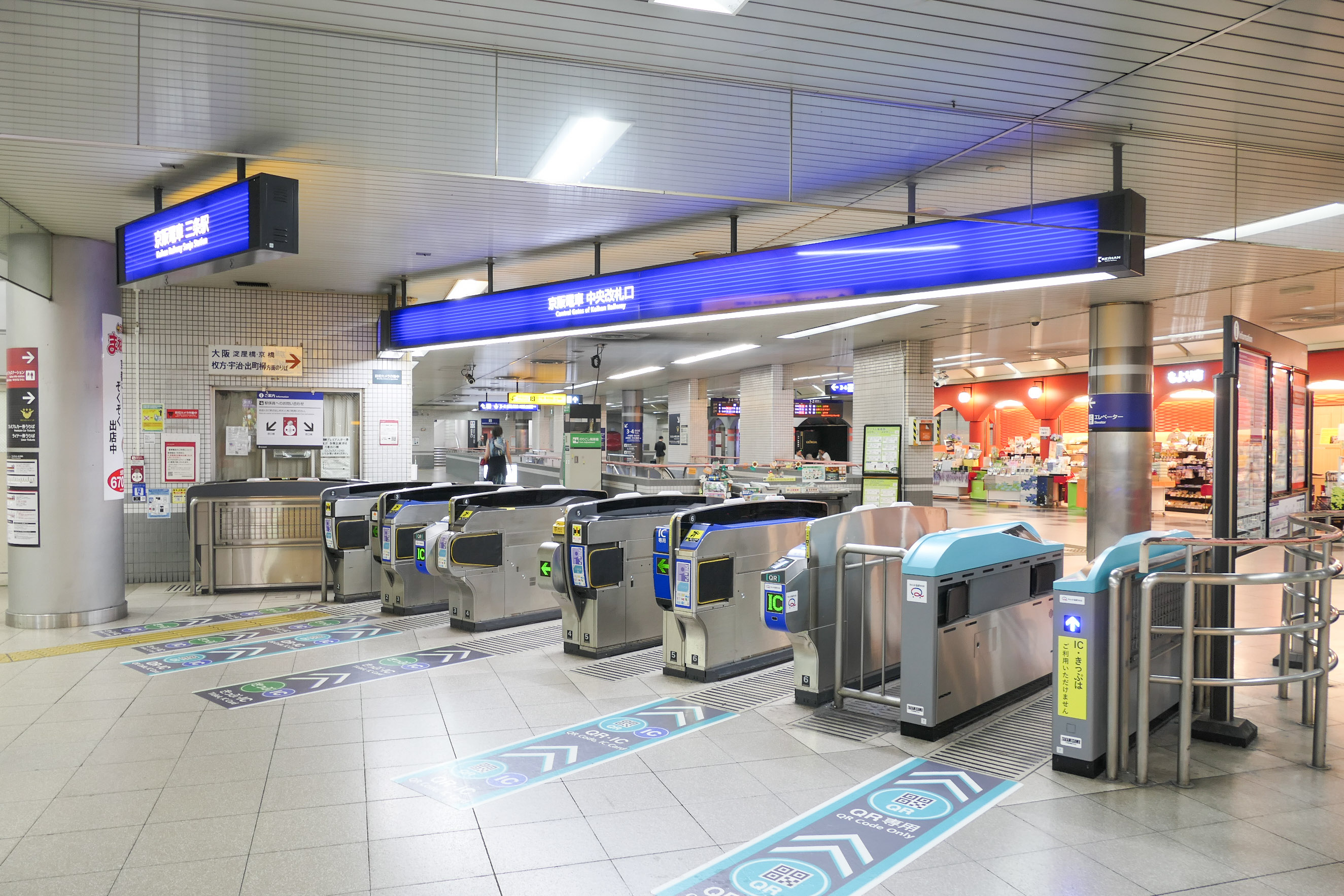
Central gate

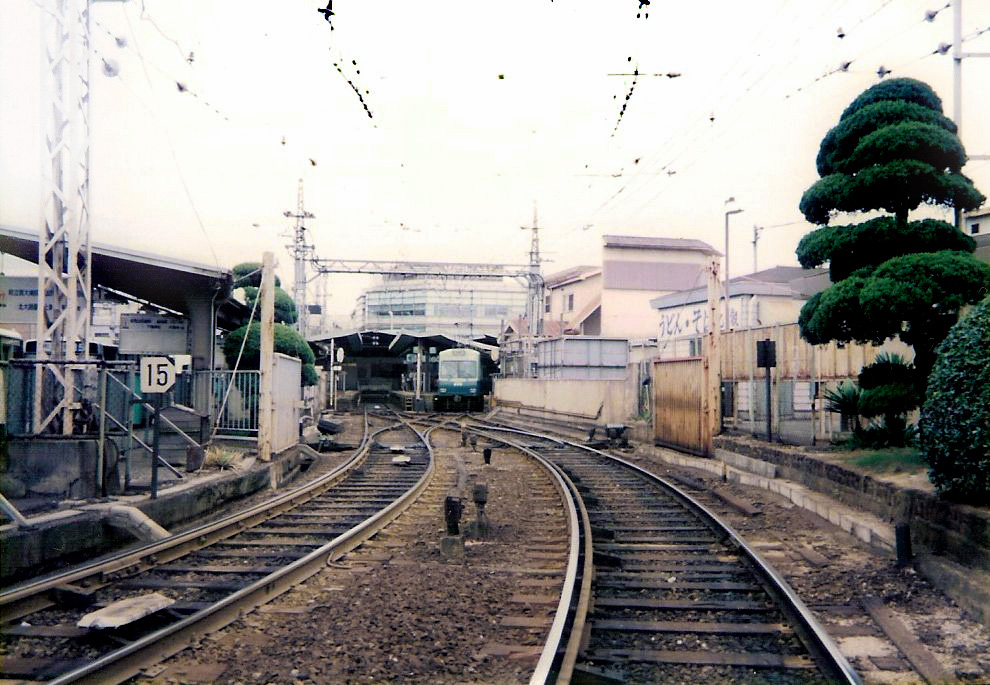
Keishin Line station before its closure in 1997

Sanjō Station (三条駅, Sanjō-eki) is a Keihan Electric Railway station in Kyoto. Located in Higashiyama Ward at the intersection of Sanjō Street and Kawabata Street, the station provides access to the Gion district and the main shopping district on Sanjō Street. It connects with Sanjo Keihan Station on the Kyoto Municipal Subway's Tozai Line.

== Lines ==
- Keihan Electric Railway
  - Keihan Main Line
  - Ōtō Line
- Kyoto Municipal Subway
  - Tōzai Line (Sanjō Keihan Station)

The station was also a terminal of the Keishin Line, which was replaced by the Tōzai Line subway in 1997.

== Layout ==
There are two island platforms with four tracks under Kawabata Dori.

1, 2	■ north-eastbound (Ōtō Line)	for Demachiyanagi
3, 4	■ south-westbound (Keihan Line)	for Chūshojima, Hirakatashi, Yodoyabashi and Nakanoshima

== Adjacent stations ==
«	Service	»
Keihan Electric Railway (KH40)
Keihan Main Line, Ōtō Line
Gion-Shijō (Keihan Line, KH39)	Local	Jingū-Marutamachi (Ōtō Line, KH41)
Gion-Shijo (Keihan Line, KH39)	Sub Express; Commuter Sub Express for Yodoyabashi or Nakanoshima (in the morning on weekdays)	Jingū-Marutamachi (Ōtō Line, KH41)
Gion-Shijo (Keihan Line, KH39)	Express	Jingū-Marutamachi (Ōtō Line, KH41)
Gion-Shijō (Keihan Line, KH39)	Rapid Express; Commuter Rapid Express for Nakanoshima (in the morning on weekdays)	Demachiyanagi (Ōtō Line, KH42)
Gion-Shijō (Keihan Line, KH39)	Limited Express	Demachiyanagi (Ōtō Line, KH42)
Gion-Shijō (Keihan Line, KH39)	Rapid Limited Express (on Saturdays, Sundays and holidays during the tourist seasons and new year period)	Demachiyanagi (Ōtō Line, KH42)

== Station Area ==
- Sanjō Ōhashi
- Ponto-chō
- Ikedaya incident
