= Yodoyabashi Station =

Railway and metro station in Osaka, Japan

Yodoyabashi Station 淀屋橋駅
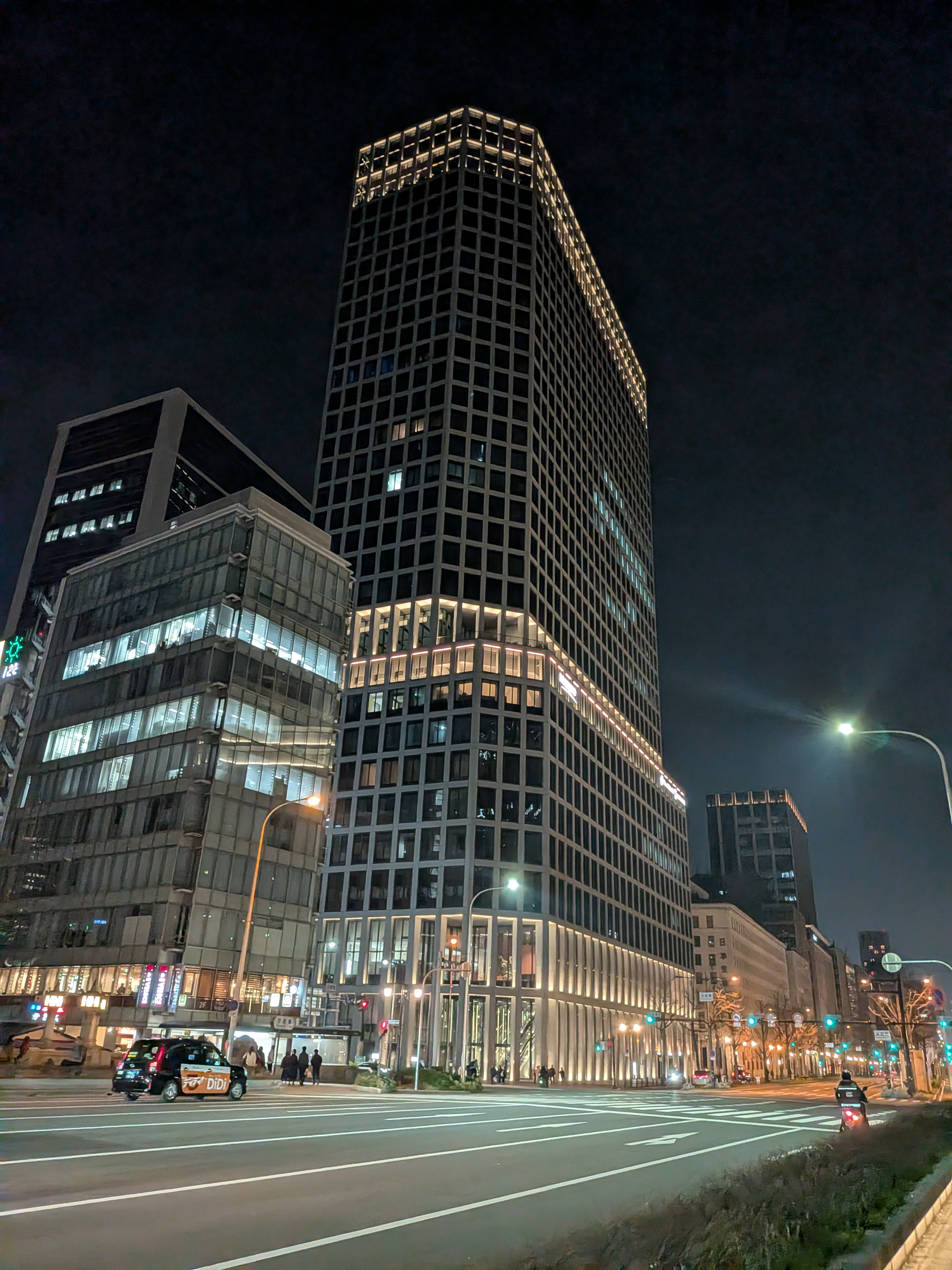

General information
- Location: Kitahama Sanchome, Chūō, Osaka, Osaka （大阪市中央区北浜三丁目） Japan
- Coordinates: 34°41′32″N 135°30′04″E
- Operator: Osaka Metro; Keihan Electric Railway
- Connections: Bus stop
Location

Yodoyabashi Station (淀屋橋駅, Yodoyabashi-eki) is a railway station on the Osaka Metro Midosuji Line and the Keihan Railway Keihan Main Line in Japan. It is the nearest station to the Osaka City Hall (大阪市役所).

== Lines ==
- Osaka Metro
  - Midōsuji Line (M17)
- Keihan Electric Railway
  - Keihan Main Line

== Layout ==
=== Osaka Metro Midosuji Line ===
Yodoyabashi 淀屋橋
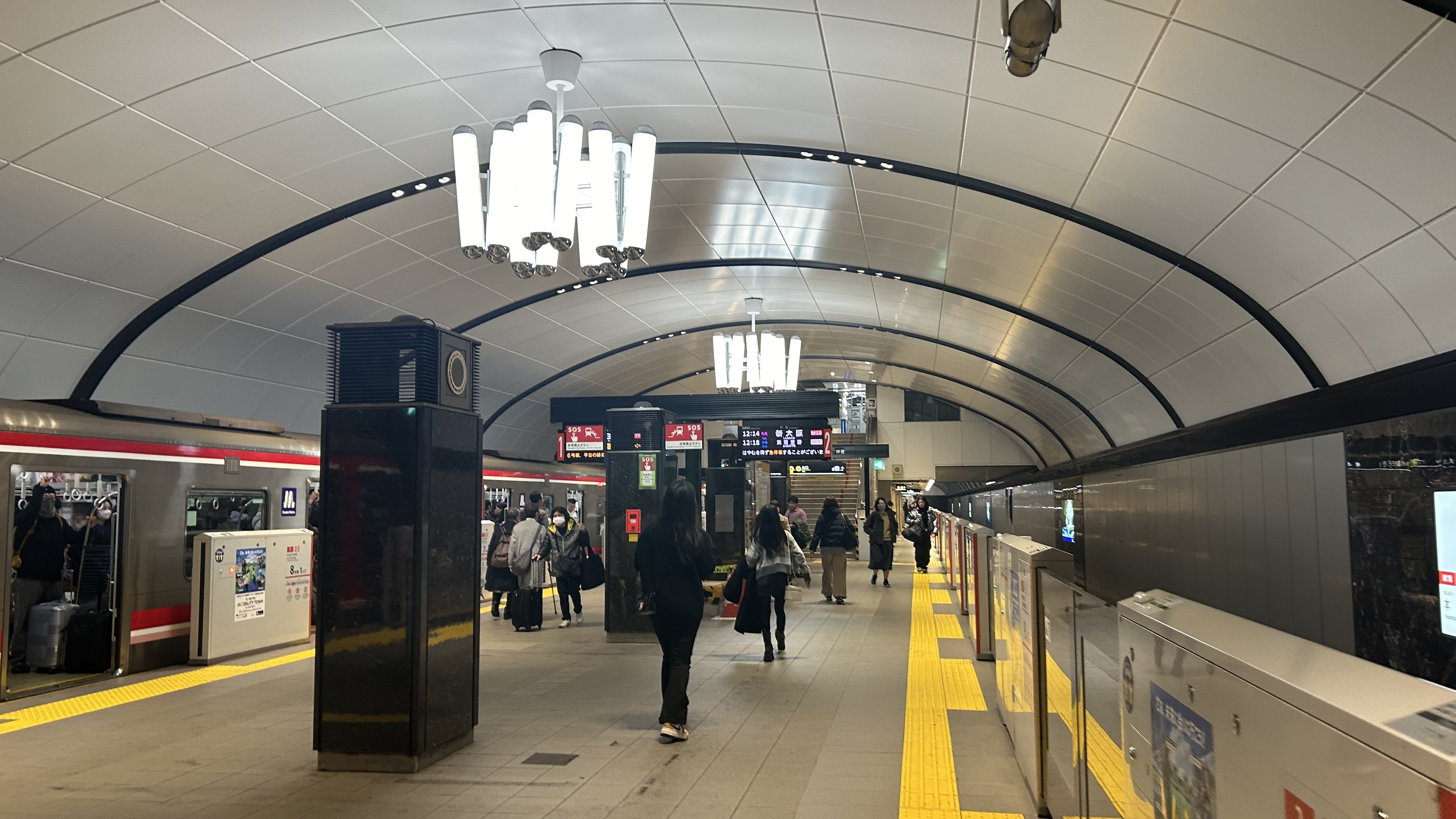
- Subway platform

General information
- Other names: Osaka City Hall (市役所前)
- System: Osaka Metro
- Operator: Osaka Metro
- Line: Midōsuji Line
- Platforms: 1 island platform
- Tracks: 2
- Connections: Bus stop

Construction
- Structure type: Underground

Other information
- Station code: M 17

History
- Opened: 20 May 1933; 93 years ago

Services
Preceding station	Osaka Metro	Following station
Umeda M 16 towards Esaka	Midōsuji Line	Hommachi M 18 towards Nakamozu
Track layout
Location

The subway station is an island platform with two tracks on the 2nd basement. Ticket gates are located in the north, the center-north, the center-south and the south on the 1st basement. The Keihan Main Line is close to the north gates.

G	Street Level	Exit/Entrance
B1F	Mezzanine	Ticket gates, ticket/ICOCA/PiTaPa machines, station agent, restrooms Passageways to Keihan Main Line platforms
B2F; Platform level	Platform 1	Midōsuji Line towards Nakamozu (Hommachi) →
B2F; Platform level	Island platform, doors will open on the right
B2F; Platform level	Platform 2	← Midōsuji Line towards Esaka (Umeda) (Through service to Minoh-kayano on the Kitakyu Namboku Line)

=== Keihan Railway Keihan Main Line ===
Yodoyabashi 淀屋橋
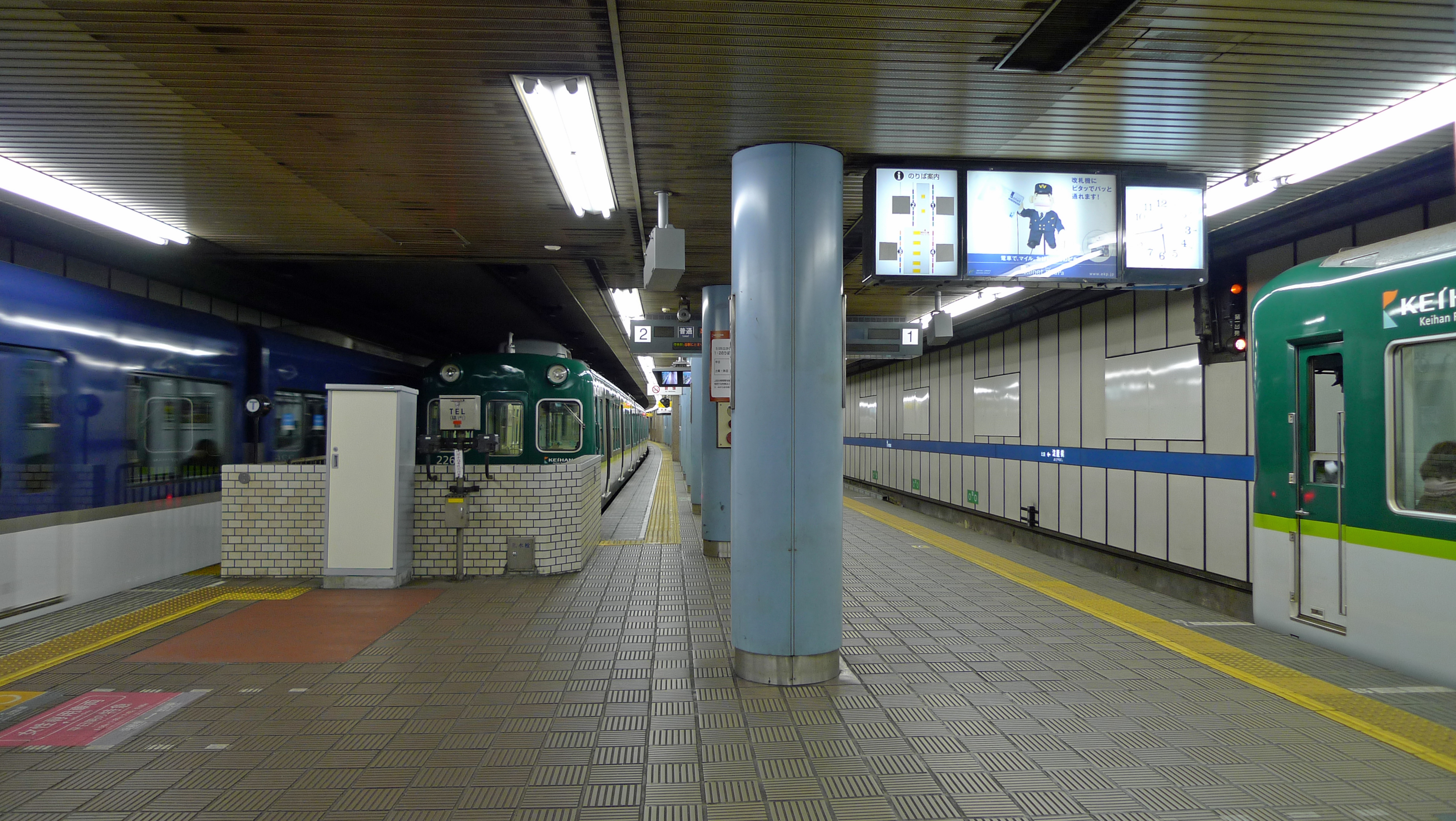

General information
- System: Keihan Electric Railway
- Operator: Keihan Electric Railway
- Line: Keihan Main Line
- Connections: Bus stop

Other information
- Station code: KH01

History
- Opened: 1963
Track layout
Location

Keihan station has an island platform serving four tracks on the 2nd basement. Ticket gates are located on the 1st basement, and named in order from the east to west, East Gates 2, East Gates 1, Central Gates, West Gates and West Exit Gates 0. The Osaka Municipal Subway Midosuji Line is close to the West Gates and the West Exit Gates 0.

The following ticket gates are open during the following hours.

- East Gates 1 - only on weekday rush-hours (7:30–9:50, 17:10–21:15)
- East Gates 2 - only on weekday mornings (7:30–9:50)
- West Exit Gates 0 - (7–21 on weekdays and Saturdays, 8–19 on Sundays, Japanese national holidays, obon period and year-change period)

In addition, West Gates are used only for exit till 9 on weekdays.

1	■ Keihan Line	for Hirakatashi, Chushojima, Sanjo and Demachiyanagi (8 car-length) not in use in off-peak hours every day used for local trains and semi-express trains on weekday rush hours used only for deadhead trains on Saturdays and holidays
2	■ Keihan Line	for Hirakatashi, Chushojima, Sanjo and Demachiyanagi (7 car-length) not in use in off-peak hours every day used for local trains and semi-express trains in the rush hours
3	■ Keihan Line	for Hirakatashi, Chushojima, Sanjo and Demachiyanagi (8 car-length) mainly used for sub express trains and express trains
4	■ Keihan Line	for Hirakatashi, Chushojima, Sanjo and Demachiyanagi (8 car-length) mainly used for limited express trains used for the midnight express train for Kuzuha (departing at 0:20)

== Toilet ==
Osaka Metro is located inside the north and south ticket gates, while Keihan is located outside the west ticket gate.

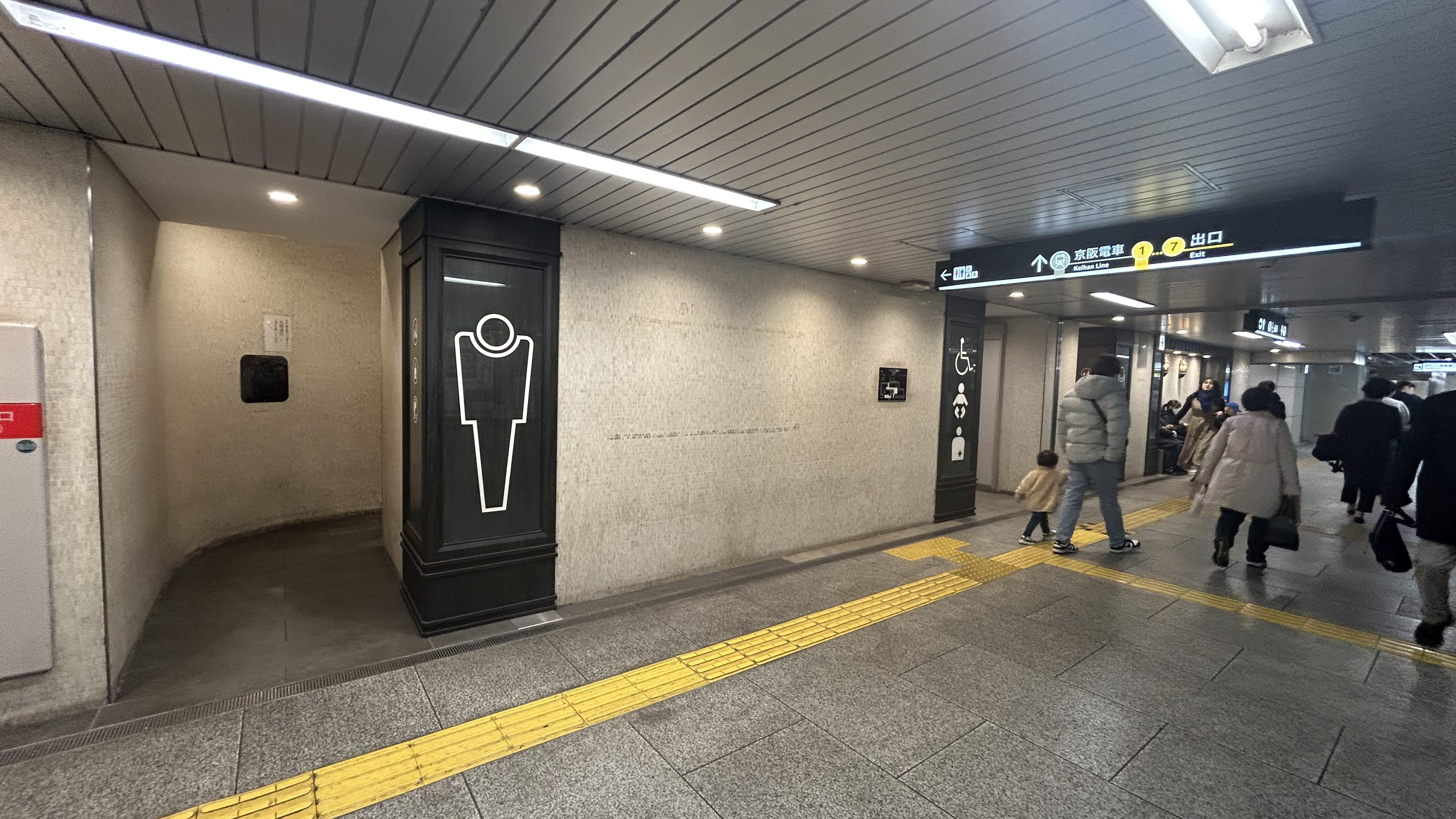
Osaka Metro nouth ticket gates Toilet

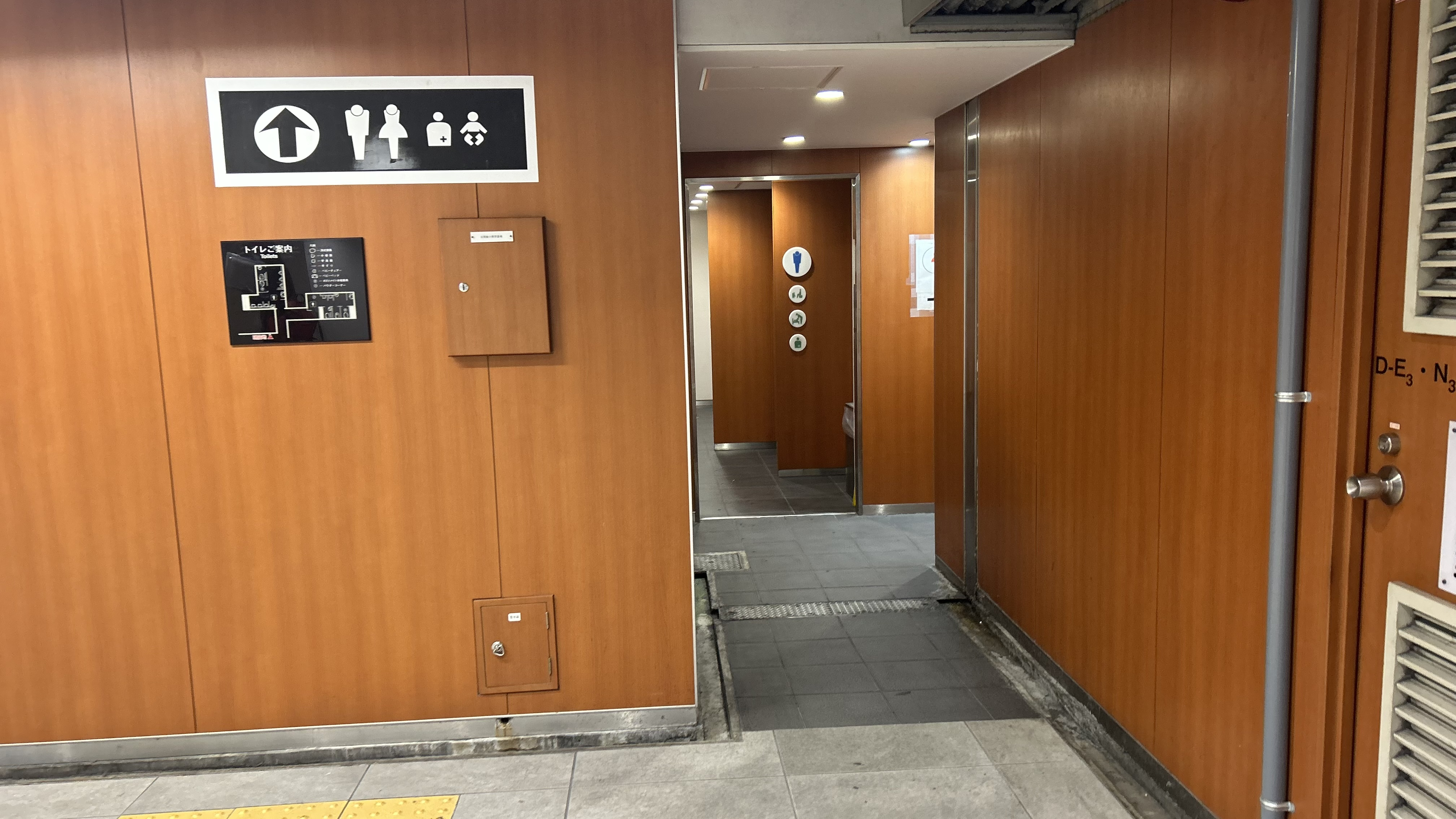
Osaka Metro south ticket gates Toilet

== Establishments around the station ==
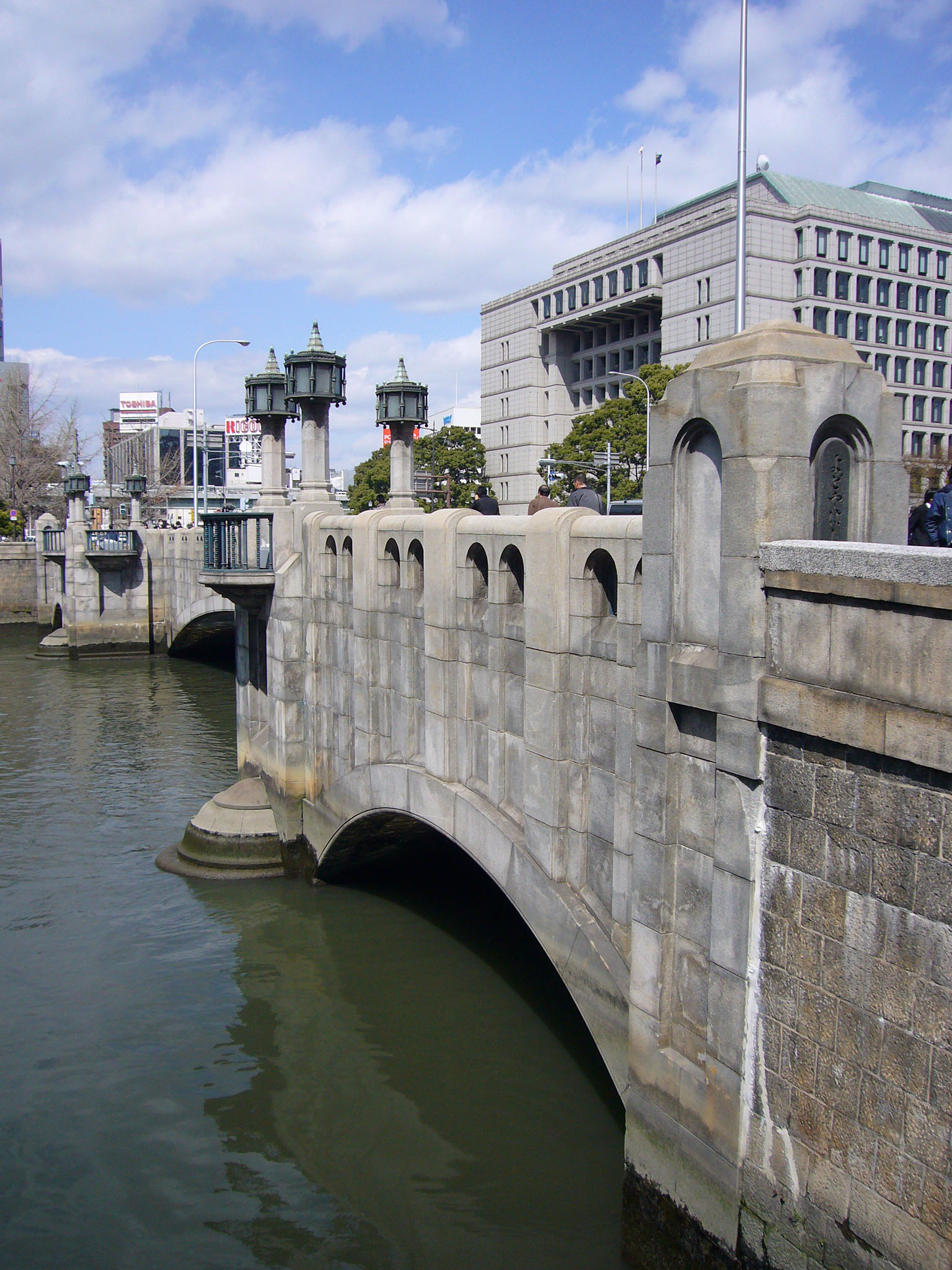
City hall behind Yodoyabashi Bridge

- Osaka City Hall
- Nakanoshima Park
- Ōebashi Station (Keihan Railway Nakanoshima Line)
- the headquarters of Osaka Gas Co., Ltd.
- the headquarters of Nippon Life Insurance Company
- the headquarters of Mizuno Corporation
- Sumitomo Mitsui Banking Corporation Osaka building
- the headquarters of Sumitomo Trust and Banking Co., Ltd.
- Bank of Japan Osaka branch
- The Bank of Tokyo-Mitsubishi UFJ Osaka branch
- the headquarters of Resona Holdings
- Mizuho Bank Osaka branch
- The Museum of Oriental Ceramics, Osaka
- Osaka Suijō Bus Yodoyabashi Pier

== Adjacent stations ==
Preceding station	Osaka Metro	Following station
Umeda M 16 towards Esaka	Midōsuji Line	Hommachi M 18 towards Nakamozu

«	Service	»
Keihan Railway (KH01)
Keihan Main Line
Terminus	All types	Kitahama (KH02)
