= Shichijō =

Shichijō (七条 or 七條) literally means seventh street in Japanese.

- Shichijō Street (七条通, Shichijō-dori), a numbered east–west street in Heian-kyō, present-day Kyoto, Japan
- Shichijō Station, a train station on the Keihan Main Line in Higashiyama-ku, Kyoto
- Shichijō family (七条家, Shichijōke), a Japanese kuge family descended from the Fujiwara Hokke (藤原北家)
