= Ryūkokudai-mae-fukakusa Station =

Railway station in Kyoto, Japan

Ryūkokudai-mae-fukakusa 龍谷大前深草駅
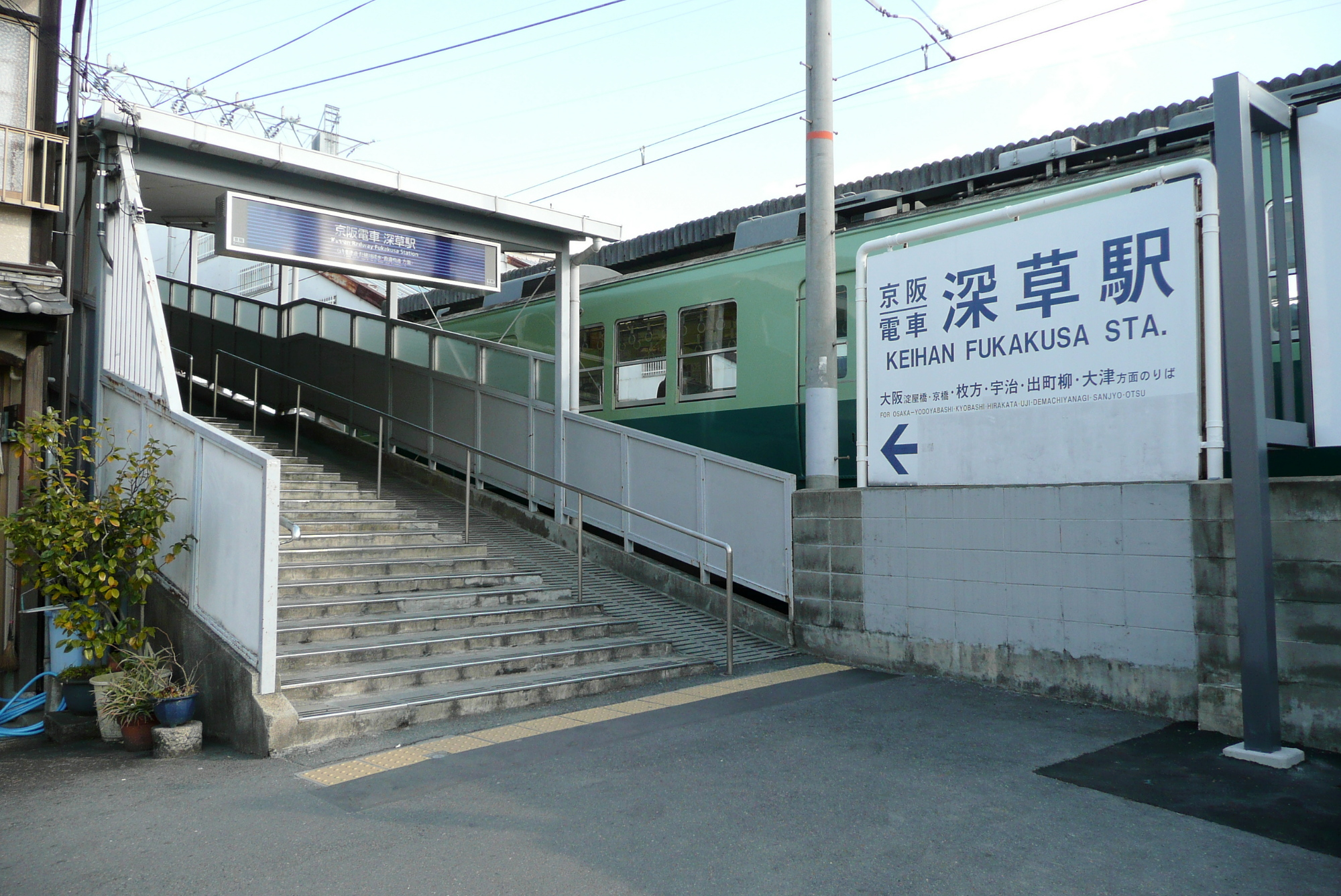
- West Gate

General information
- Location: 38 Fukakusa Susuhaki-cho, Fushimi-ku, Kyoto; Kyoto Prefecture: Japan; （京都市伏見区深草ススハキ町38番地）
- Coordinates: 34.9644°N 135.7701°E
- Operator: Keihan Electric Railway
- Line: Keihan Main Line
- Distance: 44.1 km from Yodoyabashi
- Platforms: 2
- Tracks: 2

Construction
- Structure type: At-grade

Other information
- Station code: KH33
- Website: Official (in Japanese)

History
- Opened: 1910; 116 years ago

Passengers
- FY2015: 4.4 million
Location

Ryūkokudai-mae-fukakusa Station (龍谷大前深草駅, Ryūkokudaimaefukakusa eki) is a railway station located in Fushimi-ku, Kyoto, Kyoto Prefecture, Japan.

It was originally known as Fukakusa Station (深草駅, Fukakusa-eki). The station was renamed in October 2019 to reflect the station's proximity to Ryukoku University.

== Lines ==
- Keihan Electric Railway
  - Keihan Main Line

== Surrounding Area ==
- Inari Station
- Ryukoku University Fukakusa Campus and Faculty of Junior College

== Adjacent stations ==
«	Service	»
Keihan Railway Keihan Main Line
Rapid Limited Express for Demachiyanagi (in the evening on weekdays): Does not stop at this station
Limited Express: Does not stop at this station
Commuter Rapid Express for Nakanoshima (in the morning on weekdays): Does not stop at this station
Rapid Express: Does not stop at this station
Express: Does not stop at this station
Fujinomori	Commuter Sub Express for Yodoyabashi or Nakanoshima (in the morning on weekdays)	Fushimi-Inari
Fujinomori	Sub Express	Fushimi-Inari
Fujinomori	Local	Fushimi-Inari
