= Inari Station =

Railway station in Kyoto, Japan

Inari Station 稲荷駅
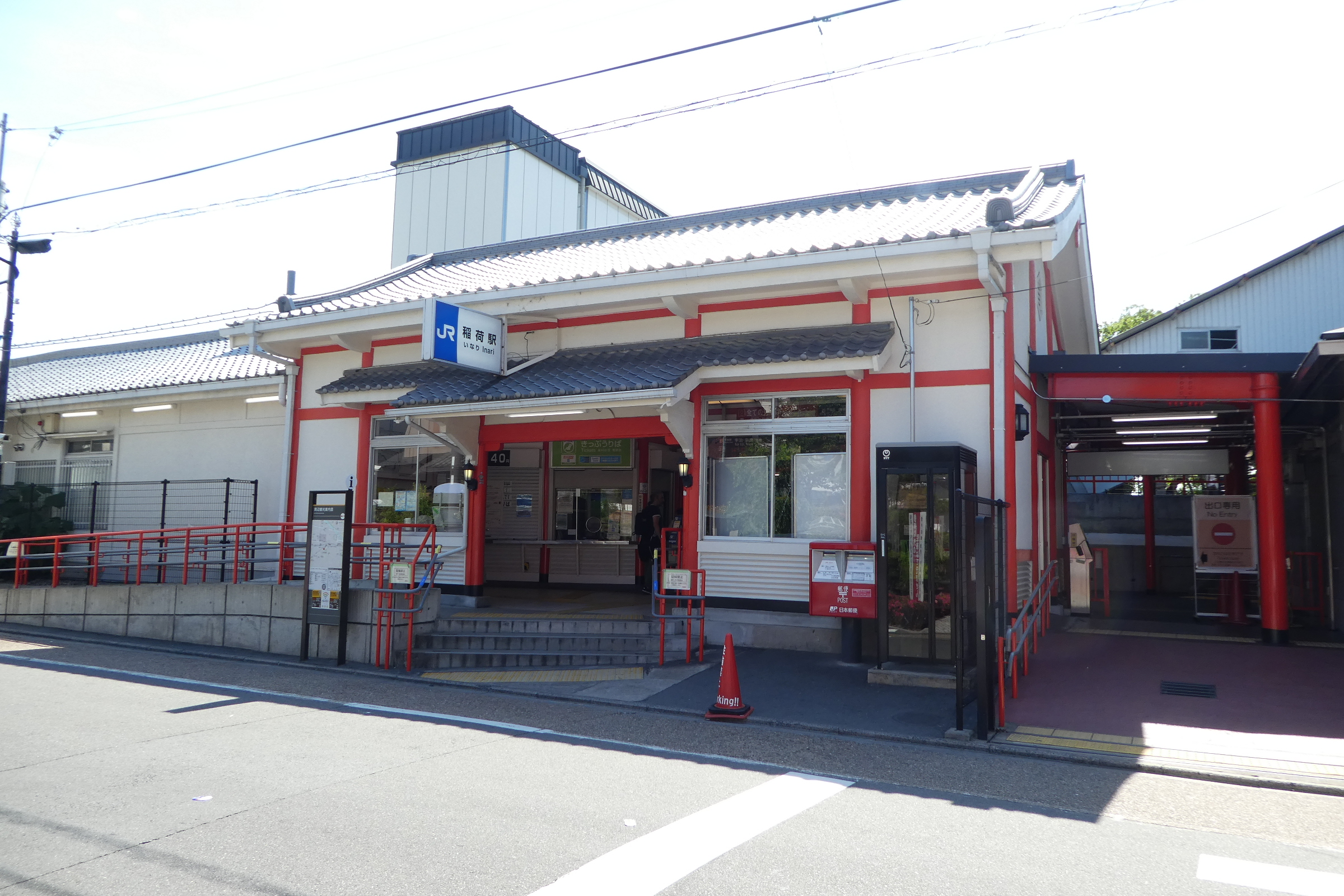
- Inari Station in May 2018

General information
- Location: Fukakusa Inari Ommae-chō, Fushimi, Kyoto (京都市伏見区深草稲荷御前町); Kyoto Prefecture; Japan
- Coordinates: 34°58′0.6″N 135°46′15.06″E
- Operator: JR West
- Line: Nara Line

Construction
- Structure type: Ground level
- Accessible: Yes

Other information
- Station code: JR-D03
- Website: Official website

History
- Opened: 1879

Passengers
- FY 2023: 18,228 daily
Location
- Location within Kyoto Prefecture Location within Japan

Inari Station (稲荷駅, Inari-eki) is a railway station on the Nara Line in Fushimi-ku, Kyoto, Japan, operated by West Japan Railway Company (JR West). The station number is JR-D03. It is the closest station to Fushimi Inari-taisha Shrine.

== Layout ==
The station has two side platforms, serving one track each.

=== Platforms ===
1	■ Nara Line	for Kyoto
2	■ Nara Line	for Uji and Nara

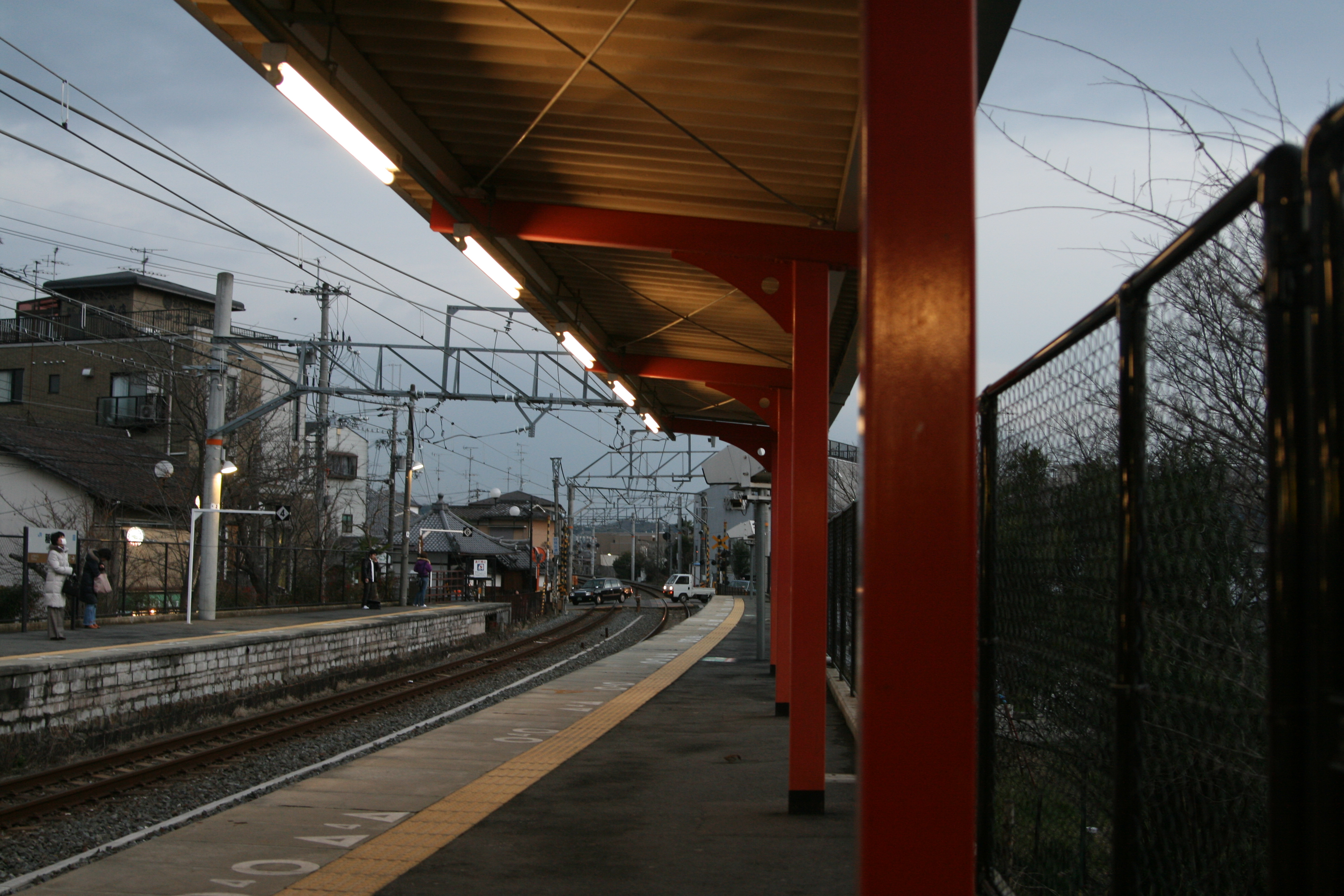
Inari Station platforms in January 2008

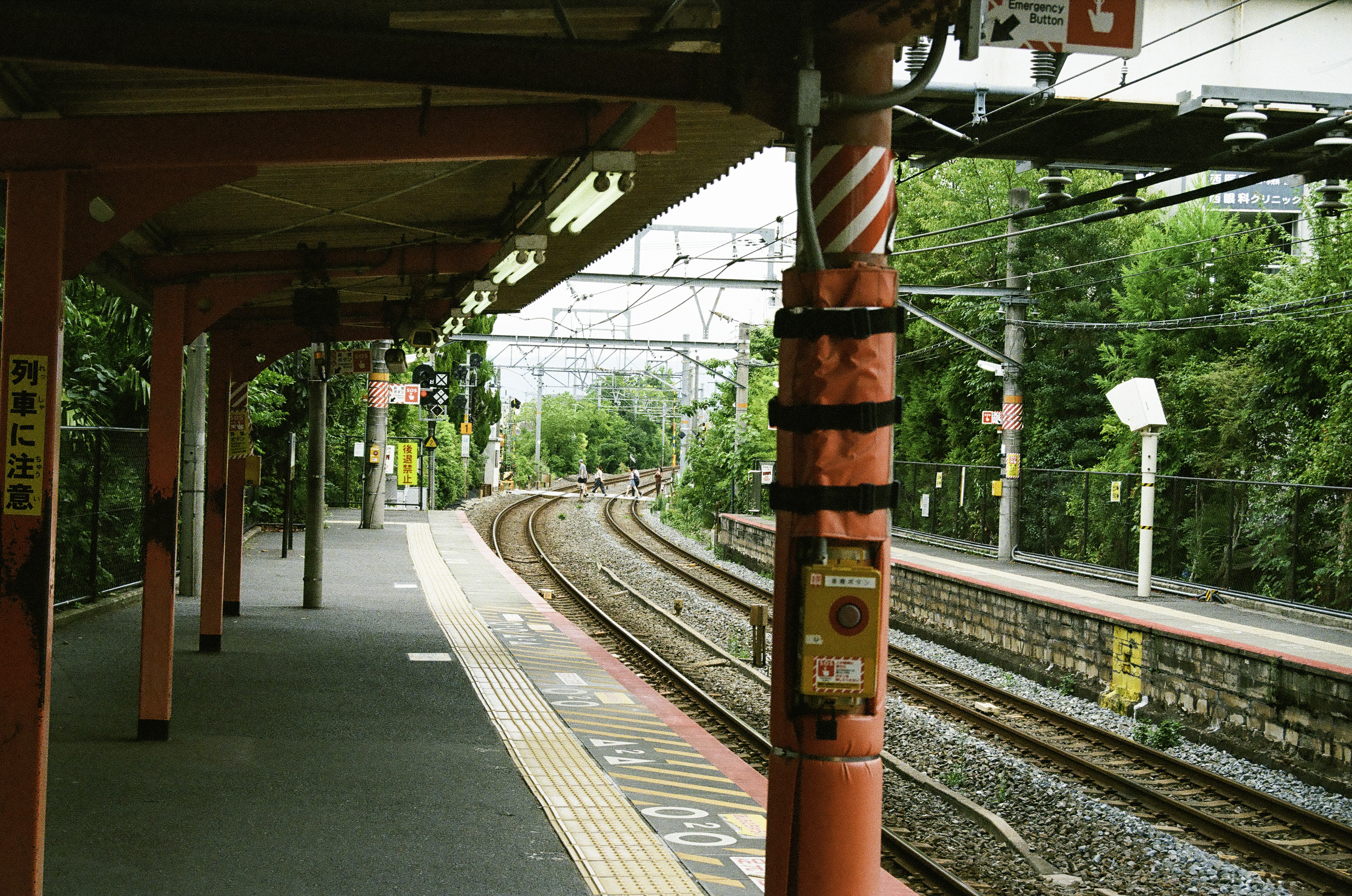
Inari Station Platforms in September 2024

== Passenger statistics ==
According to the Kyoto Prefecture statistical report, the average number of passengers per day is as follows.

Year	Number of passengers
1999	4,203
2000	4,266
2001	4,471
2002	4,567
2003	4,759
2004	4,961
2005	5,055
2006	5,233
2007	5,406
2008	5,452
2009	5,375
2010	5,608
2011	5,892
2012	6,492
2013	7,016
2014	7,285
2015	8,683
2016	9,041

== Adjacent stations ==
«	Service	»
Nara Line
Tofukuji	Local	JR Fujinomori
Regional Rapid Service: Does not stop at this station
Rapid Service: Does not stop at this station
Miyakoji Rapid Service: Does not stop at this station
Japanese Government Railways
Tokaido Line (abandoned route)
Yamashina	-	Kyoto

== Surrounding area ==
Inari Station serves several nearby sites. Among these are the major Shinto shrine Fushimi Inari-taisha and the Fukakusa campus of Ryukoku University. Although direct transfers are not available, Fukakusa and Fushimi-Inari Stations on the Keihan Main Line are close by. Students and staff members can access Ritsumeikan Junior & Senior High School and Kyoto Municipal Fushimi Technical High School from Inari Station.

== History ==
Station numbering was introduced in March 2018 with Inari being assigned station number JR-D03.

== See also ==
- Fushimi-Inari Station (Keihan)
