= Gion-Shijō Station =

Railway station in Kyoto, Japan

Gion-Shijō Station 祇園四条駅
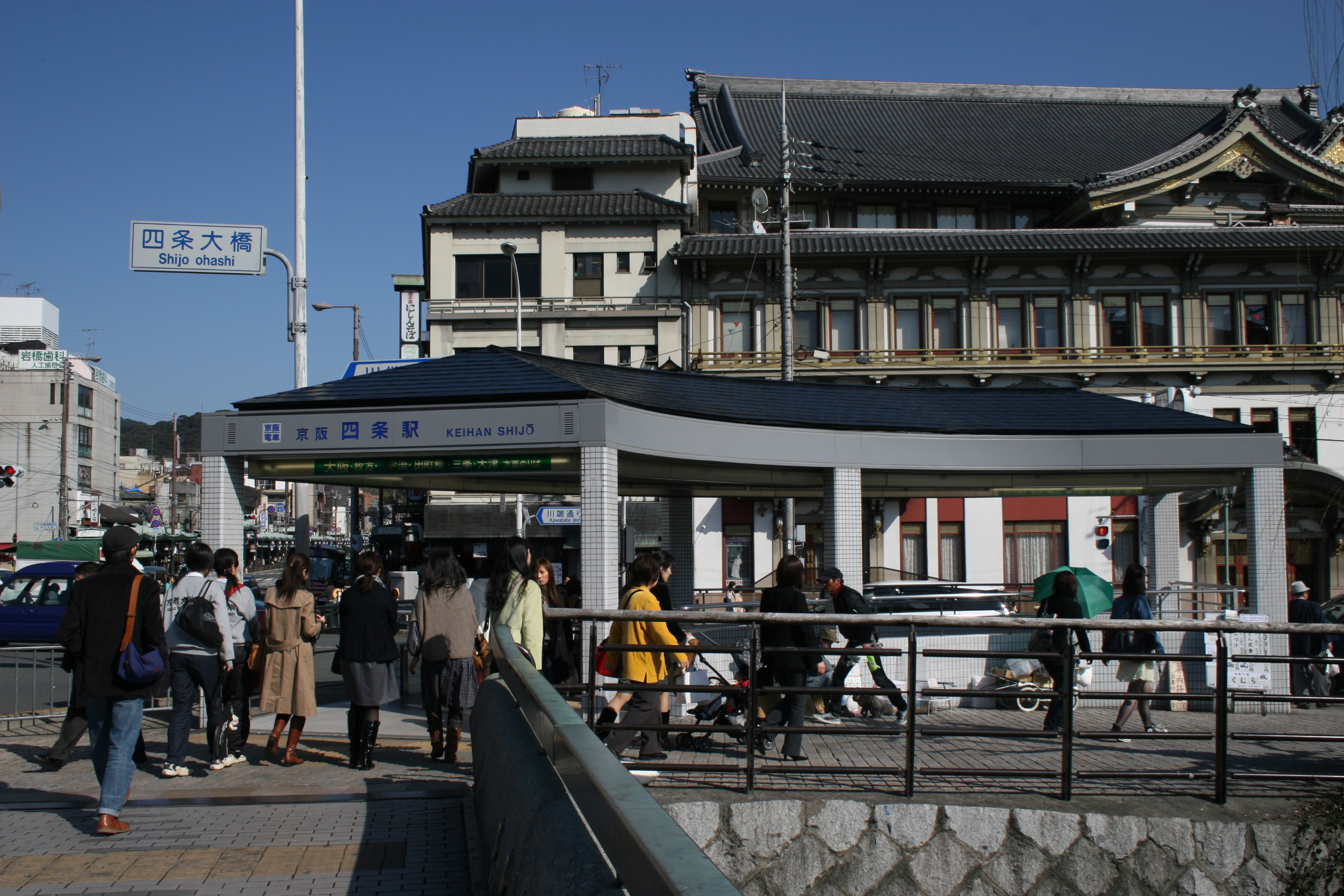
- Gion-Shijō Station entrance, March 2008

General information
- Location: Higashiyama, Kyoto, Kyoto; Japan
- Coordinates: 35°0′13.7″N 135°46′19.3″E
- Operator: Keihan Electric Railway
- Line: Keihan Main Line
- Connections: Kawaramachi Station (Hankyu Kyoto Main Line)

History
- Opened: 1915; 111 years ago
- Former names: Shijō (until 2008)

Passengers
- FY 2023: 46,778 daily
Location

Gion-Shijō Station (祇園四条駅) is a railway station in Higashiyama-ku, Kyoto, Japan, which serves the Keihan Main Line and is operated by the Keihan Electric Railway.

== Lines ==
Gion-Shijō Station is served by the Keihan Main Line. All types of passenger trains, from local to limited express, stop at the station.

== Station layout ==
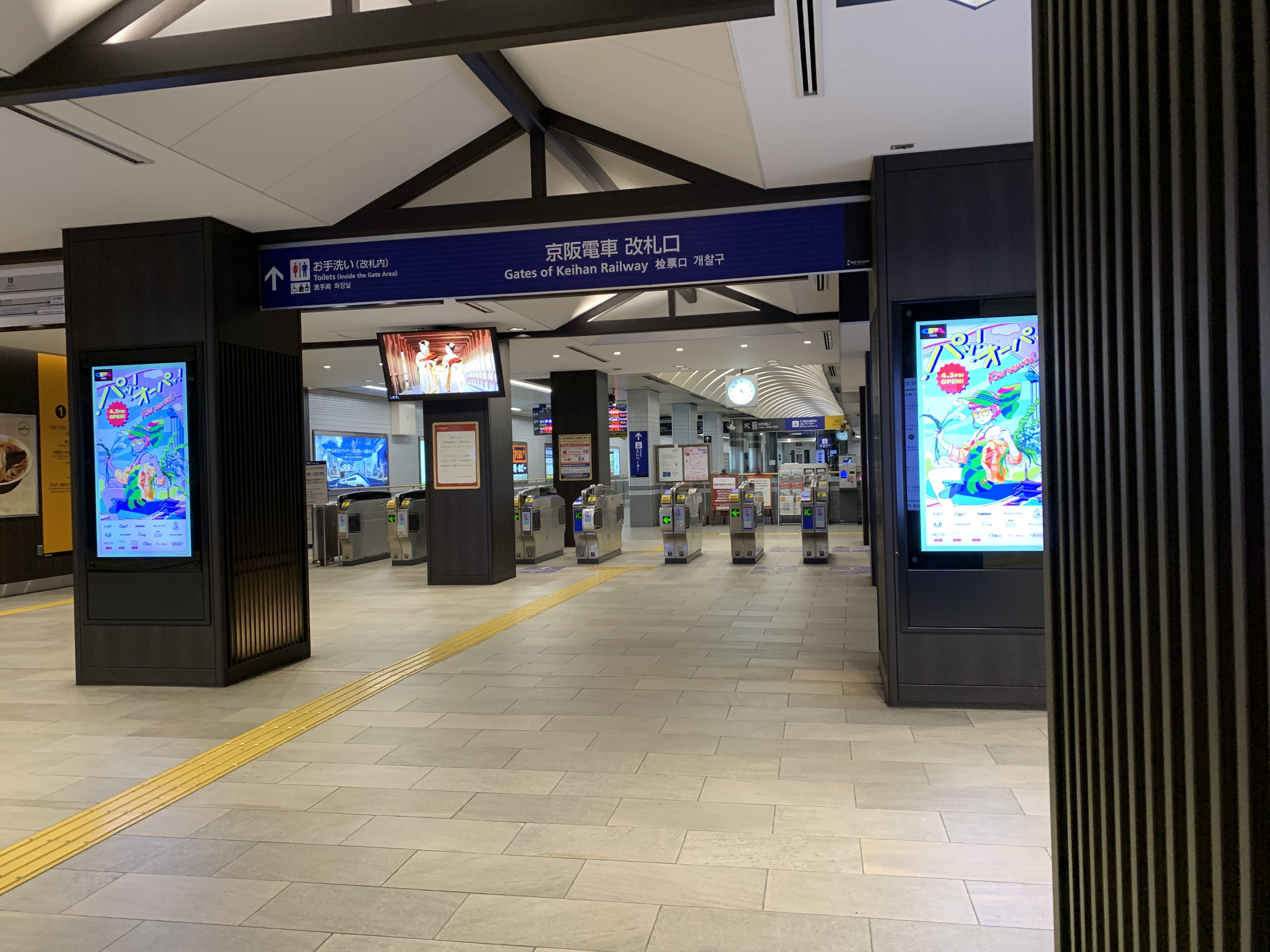
Ticket gate, April 2020

The station in a double track section has one underground island platform with two tracks. Stairs, escalators and elevators connect the platform on the second basement to the first basement concourse and then to the ground level.

=== Platforms ===
1	■ Keihan Main Line	for Sanjō and Demachiyanagi
2	■ Keihan Main Line	for Chūshojima, Hirakatashi, Yodoyabashi, and Nakanoshima

== History ==
The station opened on October 27, 1915. The tracks and the station facilities were moved to the underground on May 24, 1987. The station was originally named Shijō Station (四条駅) after Shijō Street as it is located where the railway along the bank of the Kamo River crosses Shijō Street.

Since 1981, there had been two stations along Shijō Street named Shijō; the other is on the Karasuma Line subway. At last, the Keihan station was renamed Gion-Shijō Station on October 19, 2008, the date of opening of the Nakanoshima Line.

== Surrounding area ==
- Yasaka Shrine
- Gion
- Miyagawachō
- Pontochō
- Kyoto-kawaramachi Station on the Hankyu Kyoto Line

== Adjacent stations ==
«	Service	»
Keihan Main Line
Kiyomizu-Gojō	Local	Sanjō
Kiyomizu-Gojō	Sub Express; Commuter Sub Express (only running for Yodoyabashi or Nakanoshima in the morning on weekdays)	Sanjō
Kiyomizu-Gojō	Express	Sanjō
Shichijō	Rapid Express; Commuter Rapid Express (only running for Nakanoshima in the morning on weekdays)	Sanjō
Shichijō	Limited Express	Sanjō
Shichijō	Rapid Limited Express (on Saturdays, Sundays and holidays during the tourist seasons and new year period)	Sanjō
