= Toba-kaidō Station =

Railway station in Kyoto, Japan

Toba-kaidō Station 鳥羽街道駅
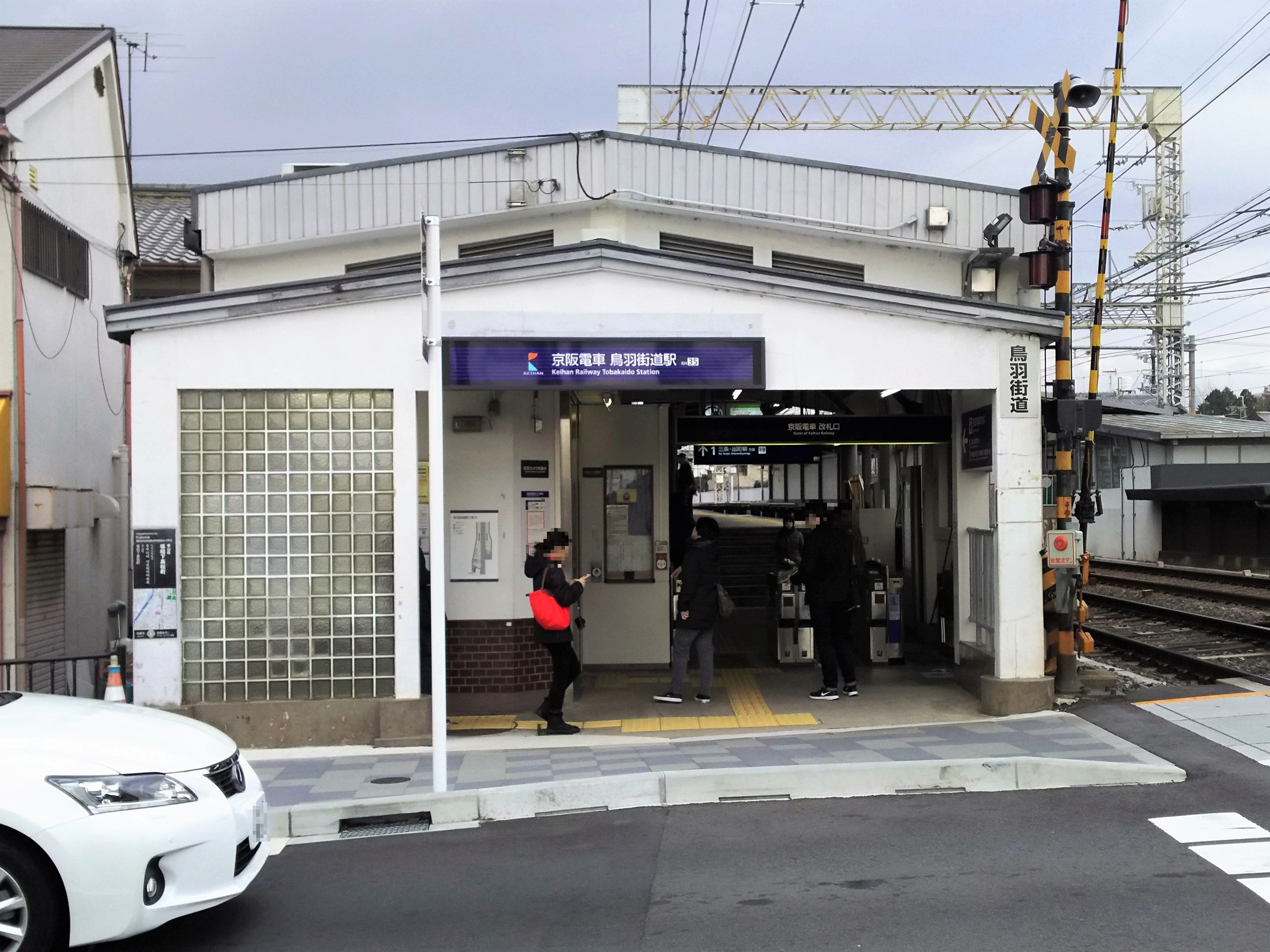
- The entrance gate of Toba-kaidō Station

General information
- Location: Higashiyama-ku, Kyoto; Kyoto Prefecture; Japan
- Coordinates: 34.9737°N 135.7700°E
- Operator: Keihan Electric Railway
- Line: Keihan Main Line
- Distance: 45.2 km from Yodoyabashi
- Platforms: 2
- Tracks: 2

Construction
- Structure type: At-grade

Other information
- Station code: KH35
- Website: Official (in Japanese)

History
- Opened: 1910; 116 years ago

Passengers
- FY2015: 1.4 million
Location

Toba-kaidō Station (鳥羽街道駅, Toba-kaidō-eki) is a railway station located in Higashiyama-ku, Kyoto, Kyoto Prefecture, Japan.

== Lines ==
- Keihan Electric Railway
  - Keihan Main Line

== Adjacent stations ==
«	Service	»
Keihan Railway Keihan Main Line
Rapid Limited Express for Demachiyanagi (in the evening on weekdays): Does not stop at this station
Limited Express: Does not stop at this station
Commuter Rapid Express for Nakanoshima (in the morning on weekdays): Does not stop at this station
Rapid Express: Does not stop at this station
Express: Does not stop at this station
Fushimi-Inari	Commuter Sub Express for Yodoyabashi or Nakanoshima (in the morning on weekdays)	Tōfukuji
Fushimi-Inari	Sub Express	Tōfukuji
Fushimi-Inari	Local	Tōfukuji
