= Fushimi-Inari Station =

Railway station in Kyoto, Japan

Coordinates: 34°58′7.54″N 135°46′9.58″E

Fushimi-Inari Station 伏見稲荷駅
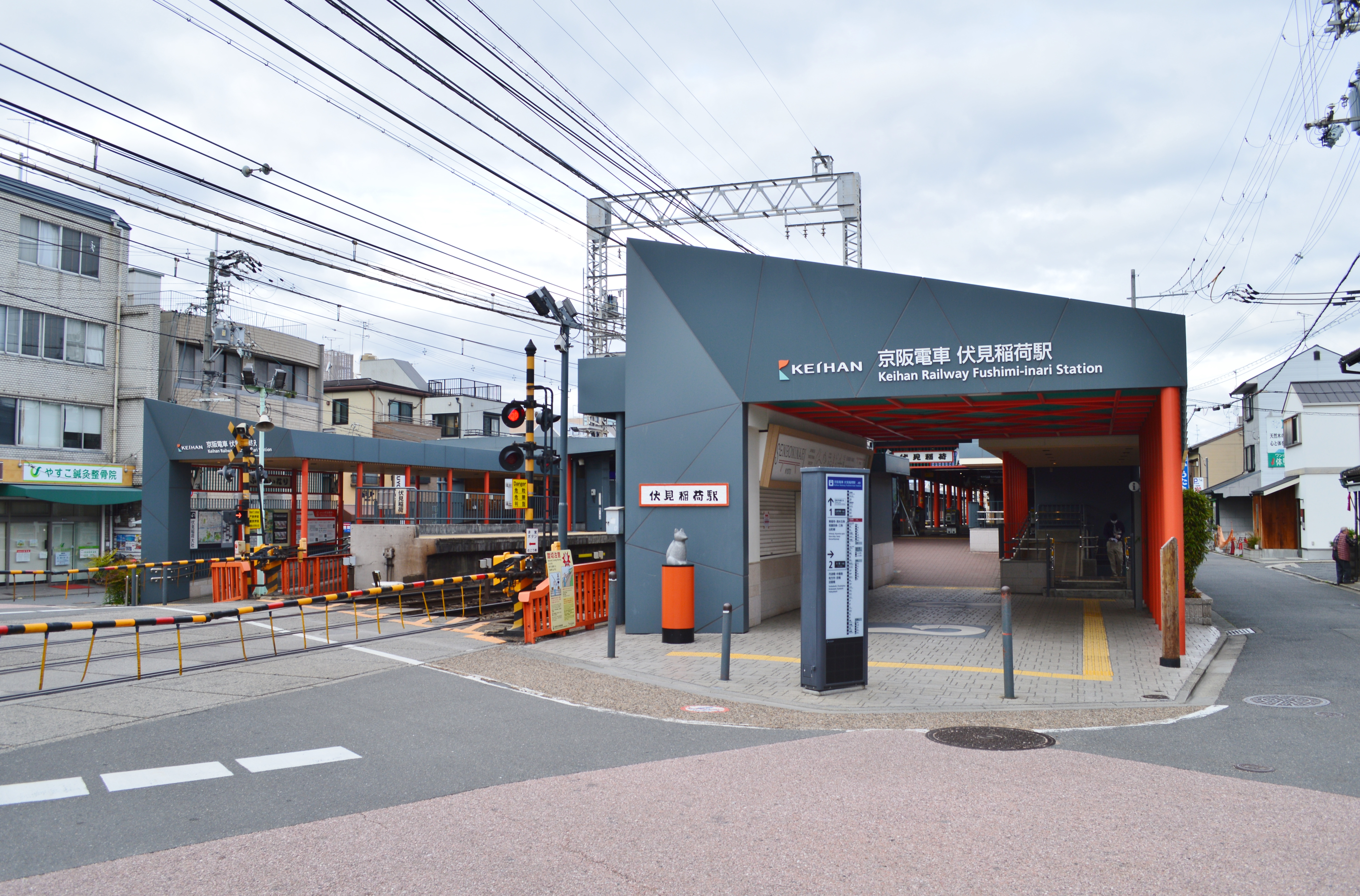
- Entrance to Kyoto-bound platform

General information
- Location: Fukukasa Ichinotsubo-chō, Fushimi, Kyoto, Kyoto （京都市伏見区深草一ノ坪町） Japan
- Operator: Keihan Electric Railway
- Line: Keihan Main Line

History
- Opened: 1910; 116 years ago
- Former names: Inari; Inari-Jinja Mae (until 1948)

Passengers
- FY2015: 3.7 million
Location

Fushimi-Inari Station (伏見稲荷駅, Fushimi-Inari-eki) is a railway station located in Fushimi-ku, Kyoto, Kyoto Prefecture, Japan, on the Keihan Electric Railway Keihan Main Line.

== Layout ==
- This station has 2 side platforms with a track each.

1	■ Keihan Main Line	for Sanjo and Demachiyanagi
2	■ Keihan Main Line	for Chushojima, Hirakatashi, Yodoyabashi and Nakanoshima

== Surroundings ==
- Fushimi Inari-taisha
- Inari Station (JR West Nara Line)

== Adjacent stations ==
«	Service	»
Keihan Railway
Keihan Main Line
Ryūkokudai-mae-fukakusa	Local	Toba-kaidō
Ryūkokudai-mae-fukakusa	Sub Express; Commuter Sub Express (only running for Yodoyabashi or Nakanoshima on weekday mornings)	Toba-kaidō
Tambabashi	Express	Shichijō
Rapid Express: Does not stop at this station
Commuter Rapid Express (only running for Nakanoshima on weekday mornings): Does not stop at this station
Limited Express: Does not stop at this station

== See also ==
- Inari Station (JR)
