= Tōfukuji Station =

Railway station in Kyoto, Japan

Tōfukuji Station 東福寺駅
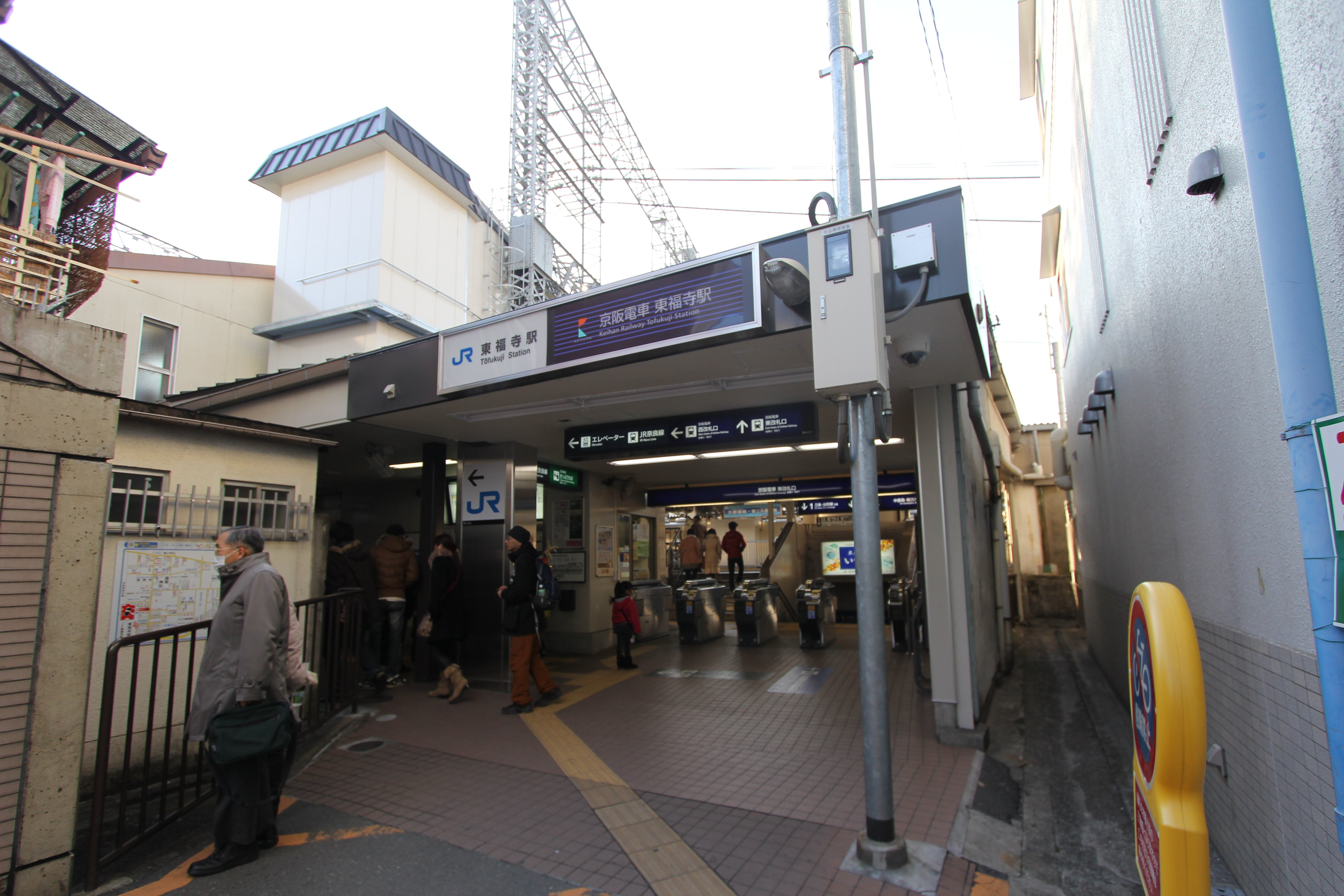
- The entrance gate of Tōfukuji Station in January 2013

General information
- Location: 224, Honmachi 12-chōme, Higashiyama, Kyoto (京都市東山区本町十二丁目224); Kyoto Prefecture; Japan
- Coordinates: 34°58′52.34″N 135°46′12.65″E
- Operator: Keihan Railway; JR West
- Lines: Keihan Main Line; Nara Line
- Connections: Bus stop

Other information
- Station code: JR-D02 (JR West)

History
- Opened: 15 April 1910; 116 years ago

Passengers
- FY 2023: 14,896 daily (Keihan); 18,794 daily (JR West)

Services
Preceding station	JR West	Following station
Kyōto towards Kyoto	Nara Line Local	Inari towards Nara
Location
- Location within Kyoto Prefecture Location within Japan

Tōfukuji Station (東福寺駅, Tōfukuji-eki) is a railway station located in Higashiyama-ku, Kyoto, Kyoto Prefecture, Japan. It serves both the Keihan Main Line and the JR West Nara Line, with passengers able to transfer directly between services. It has the Keihan station number "KH36", and the JR West station number "JR-D02".

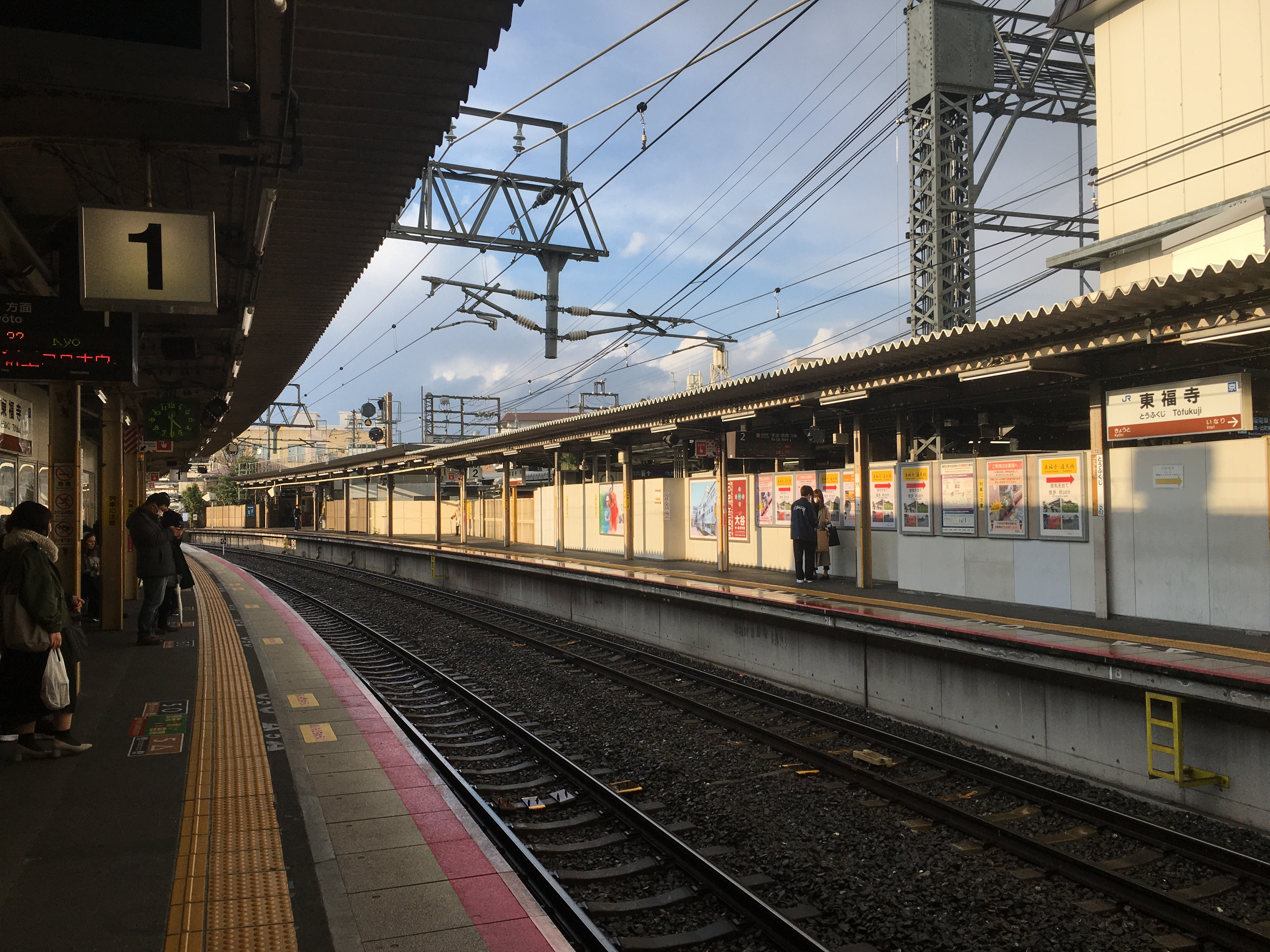
Nara line platforms, 2020

== Lines ==
- Keihan Electric Railway
  - Keihan Main Line
- West Japan Railway Company
  - Nara Line

== Layout ==
The station is at ground level. The Keihan and JR sections have two side platforms each. The Demachiyanagi-bound platform for Keihan tracks and the Nara-bound platform for JR tracks are on the same structure, but are separated by a wall. On November 6, 2011, ticket gates for transferring between services were opened between these platforms, which can be used from 7am until 7pm. Outside of these hours, passengers must walk on a bridge between the platforms.

=== Keihan Railway ===
1	■ Keihan Main Line	for Sanjo and Demachiyanagi
2	■ Keihan Main Line	for Chushojima, Hirakatashi, Yodoyabashi and Nakanoshima

=== JR West ===
1	■ Nara Line	to Kyoto
2	■ Nara Line	for Uji and Nara

== Passenger statistics ==
The Keihan station was used by 14,896 passengers per day and the JR West station was used by 18,794 passengers per day in fiscal year 2023. According to the Kyoto City statistics and Kyoto Prefecture statistics, the average number of passengers per day is as follows.

year	Keihan Line	JR Nara Line
2004	6,455	5,526
2005	6,592	5,805
2006	6,216	6,178
2007	6,170	6,433
2008	7,164	6,660
2009	7,211	6,882
2010	7,282	7,222
2011	6,934	7,538
2012	7,403	8,027
2013	7,907	8,433
2014	8,644	8,899
2015	9,366	9,541
2016	7,625	9,627

== History ==
The station opened on 15 April 1910, when operation on the Keihan Main Line began. The station initially only served Keihan trains; the track of the Nara Line, then operated by JNR, ran next to the station, and a JNR station was not built until 27 December 1957. At the time, the Nara Line was single-tracked, and the JNR station had only one platform. A passing loop and a second platform was completed in July 1994. This section of the Nara Line was double-tracked in March 2001.

Station numbering was introduced to the JR West station in March 2018 with Tōfukuji being assigned station number JR-D02.

== Adjacent stations ==
«	Service	»
Keihan Railway Keihan Main Line
Toba-kaidō	Local	Shichijō
Toba-kaidō	Sub Express; Commuter Sub Express (only running for Yodoyabashi or Nakanoshima on weekday mornings)	Shichijō
Express: Does not stop at this station
Rapid Express: Does not stop at this station
Commuter Rapid Express (only running for Nakanoshima on weekday mornings): Does not stop at this station
Limited Express: Does not stop at this station
JR West Nara Line
Kyōto	Local	Inari
Kyōto	Regional Rapid Service	Rokujizō
Kyōto	Rapid Service	Rokujizō
Kyōto	Miyakoji Rapid Service	Rokujizō
