= Kiyomizu-Gojō Station =

Railway station in Kyoto, Japan

Kiyomizu-Gojō Station 清水五条駅
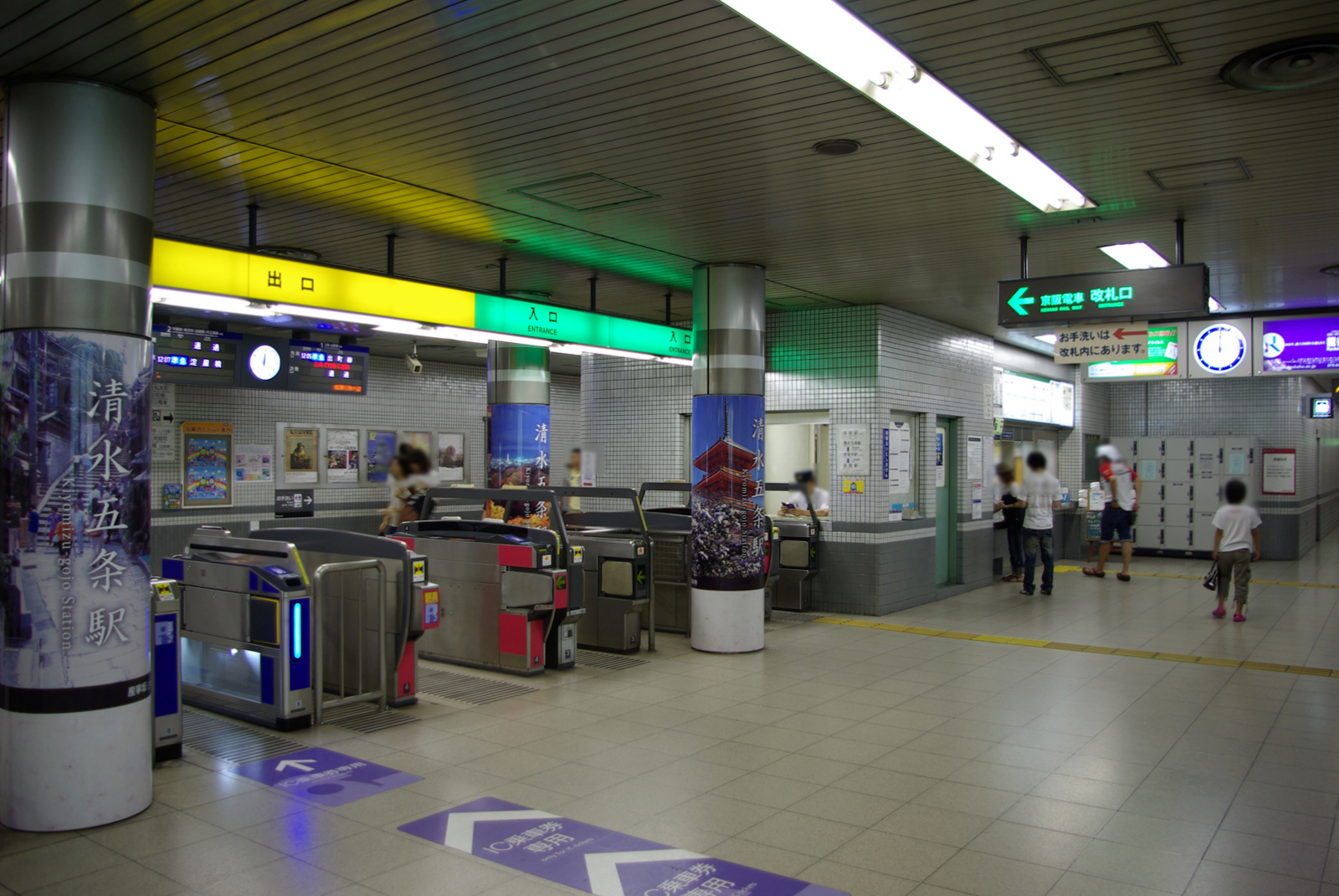
- Underground ticket gate

General information
- Location: Miyakawasuji Hatchōme, Higashiyama, Kyoto, Kyoto （京都市東山区宮川筋8丁目） Japan
- Coordinates: 34°59′45.99″N 135°46′6.7″E
- Operator: Keihan Electric Railway
- Line: Keihan Main Line
- Connections: Bus stop

History
- Opened: 1910; 116 years ago
- Former names: Gojō (until 2008)

Passengers
- FY2015: 3.3 million
Location

Kiyomizu-Gojō Station (清水五条駅) is a railway station located in Higashiyama-ku, Kyoto, Kyoto Prefecture, Japan.

The station was renamed from Gojō Station (五条駅, Gojō-eki) on October 19, 2008, the date of opening of the Nakanoshima Line.

== Line ==
- Keihan Electric Railway Keihan Main Line

== Layout ==
The station has one island platform underground, and is located under the junction on Kawabata-dori and Gojo-dori.

1	■ Keihan Main Line	for Sanjō and Demachiyanagi
2	■ Keihan Main Line	for Chūshojima, Hirakatashi, Yodoyabashi and Nakanoshima

== Surroundings ==
- Otani Hombyo
- Kiyomizu-dera
- Gojo Bridge (Kamo River)
- Gojo-dori (Japan National Route 1)
- Kawabata-dori
- Higashiyama Ward Building

== Adjacent stations ==
«	Service	»
Keihan Railway
Keihan Main Line
Shichijō	Local	Gion-Shijō
Shichijō	Sub Express; Commuter Sub Express (only running for Yodoyabashi or Nakanoshima in the morning on weekdays)	Gion-Shijō
Shichijō	Express	Gion-Shijō
Rapid Express: Does not stop at this station
Commuter Rapid Express (only running for Nakanoshima in the morning on weekdays): Does not stop at this station
Limited Express: Does not stop at this station
