= Kokaji =

Traditional Japanese play

小鍛冶
- English title: The Swordsmith
- Written by: unknown
- Category: 5th — final
- Characters: shite Boy/Inari waki Sanjō no Kokaji Munechika waki tsure Tachibana no Michinari
- Place: house of Munechika and Fushimi Inari-taisha, Kyoto
- Time: November in the late 10th century or early 11th century
- Schools: all

Kokaji (小鍛冶, The Swordsmith) is a Japanese Noh play by an unknown author.

A popular noh play centered around the creation of a sacred sword and the kami Inari, it has influenced other works of art, including several bunraku and kabuki plays. It belongs to the fifth category.

It has been praised as a piece whose "sharp movements and invigorating chants never allow the audience to become bored".

== Plot ==
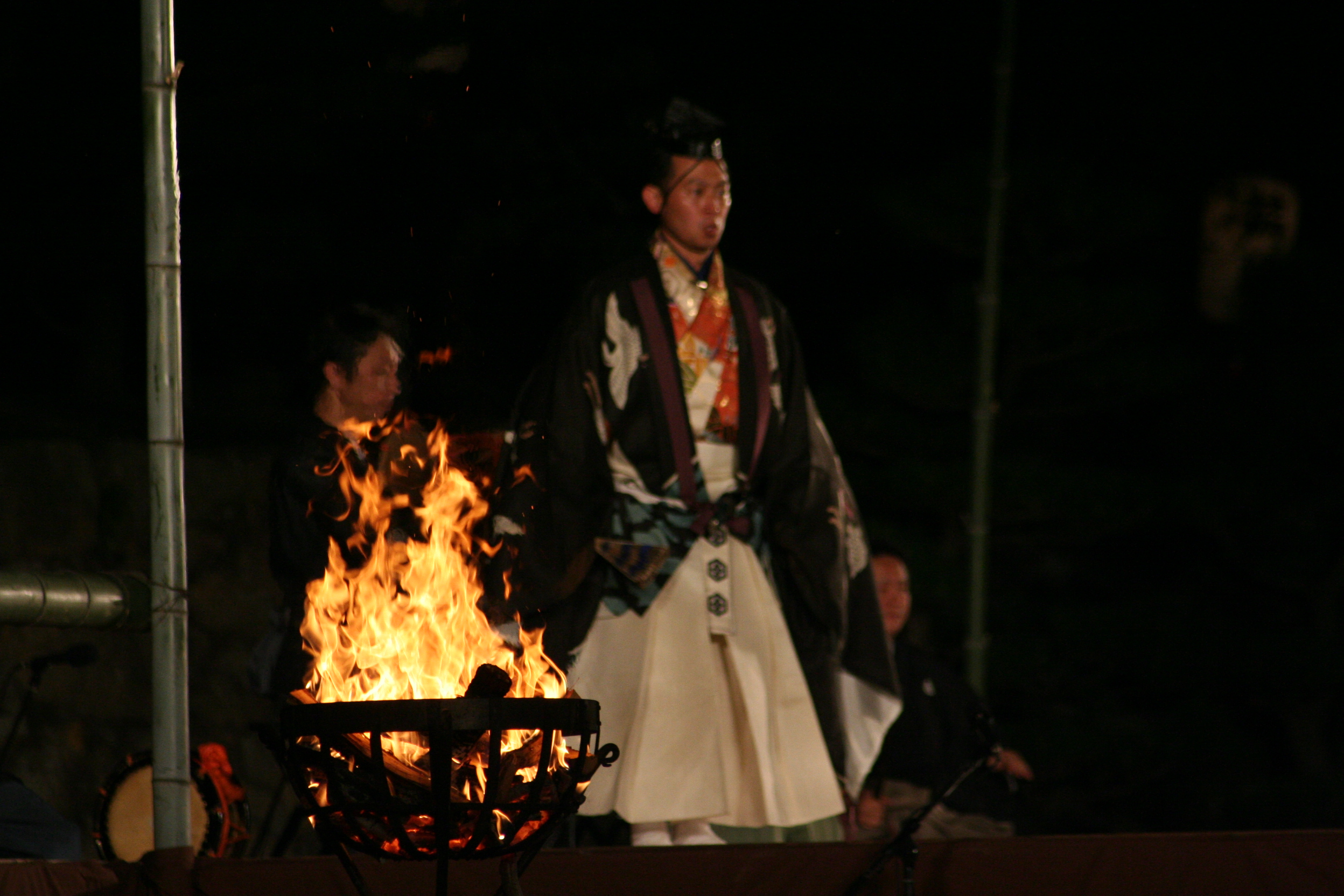
Performance of Kokaji at Himeji-jo.

Emperor Ichijo (980–1011) receives a message from the kamis in his dreams, telling him to commission a special sword from Sanjō no Kokaji Munechika. He sends Tachibana no Michinari, an imperial messenger, to deliver this order to Munechika.

Munechika receives the messenger, but he is hesitant to accept the request, as he has no smithing partner at his own level.

After reluctantly accepting the order, he heads to the Inari shrine Fushimi Inari-taisha to pray for divine help in order to fulfill the request from the emperor. There he meets a mysterious boy that already knows about the commission of the sword. The boy recounts several episodes from Chinese and Japanese history and mythology related to swords. He then tells Munechika to trust him and starts making the preparations for forging the sword, and disappears.

As Munechika finishes the ritual preparations, Inari appears in his divine form and helps Munechika forge the sacred sword. After presenting it to the imperial messenger, Inari mounts on a cloud and returns to Mount Inari.
