= Fushimi Inari-taisha =

Shinto shrine near Kyoto, Japan

Fushimi Inari-Taisha
- 伏見稲荷大社
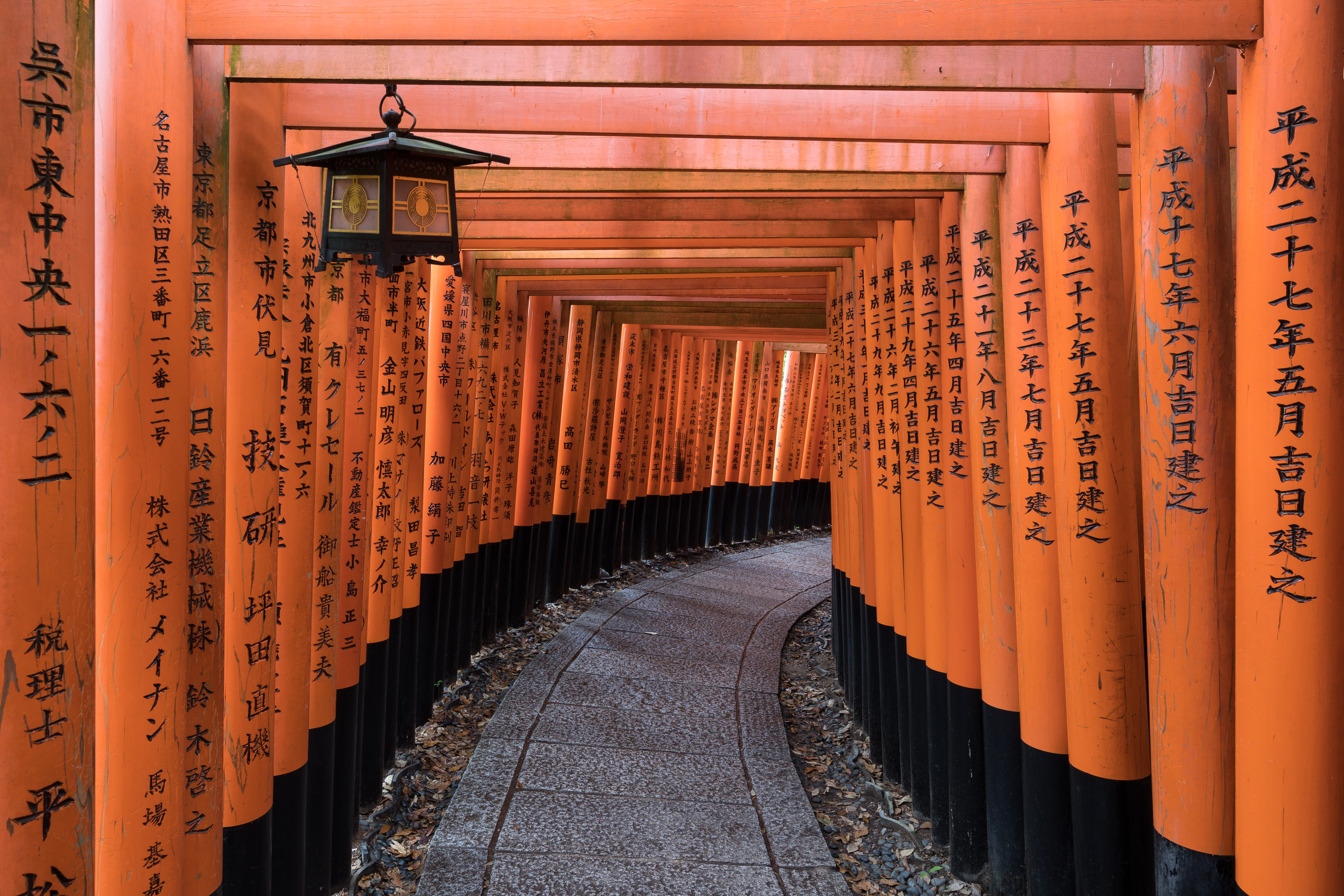
- Torii path with a hanging lantern at Fushimi Inari-Taisha Shrine

- Location within Kyoto city Location within Japan

Religion
- Affiliation: Shinto
- Deity: Uka-no-Mitama-no-Ōkami, et al. as Inari Ōkami
- Type: Inari shrine

Location
- Location: Fushimi-ku, Kyoto, Japan
- Interactive map of Fushimi Inari-Taisha
- Coordinates: 34°58′2″N 135°46′22″E

Architecture
- Style: Kasuga-zukuri
- Established: 711

Website
- inari.jp/en/

Fushimi Inari-taisha (Japanese: 伏見稲荷大社) is the head shrine of the kami Inari, located in Fushimi-ku, Kyoto, Japan. The shrine sits at the base of a mountain, also named Inari, which is 233 metres (764 ft) above sea level, and includes trails up the mountain to many smaller shrines which span 4 kilometres (2.5 mi) and take approximately 2 hours to walk up. It is unclear whether the mountain's name, Inariyama, or the shrine's name came first.

The shrine was formally founded in 711 CE by the Hata clan, an influential immigrant group from the Korean Peninsula. Inari was originally and remains primarily the kami of rice and agriculture, but merchants also worship Inari as the patron of business. Each of Fushimi Inari-taisha's roughly 10,000 torii were donated by a Japanese business, and approximately 800 of these are set in a row to form the Senbon Torii, creating the impression of a tunnel. The shrine is said to have ten thousand such gates in total that designate the entrance to the holy domain of kami and protect it against wicked forces.

Owing to the popularity of Inari's division and re-enshrinement, this shrine is said to have as many as 32,000 sub-shrines (分社 bunsha) throughout Japan.

== History ==
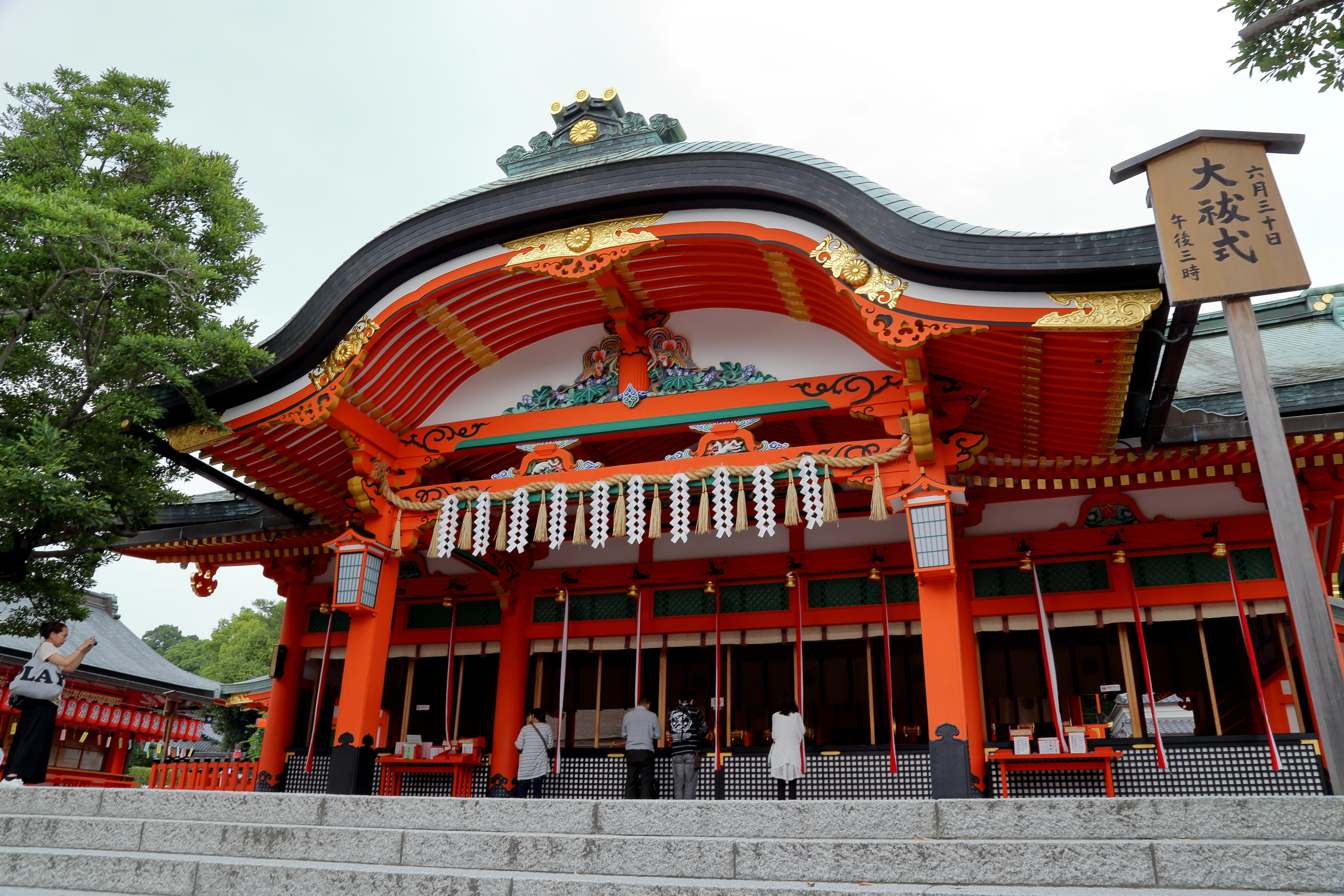
Front view of the haiden

The shrine's foundation is traditionally dated to 711 CE (the Wadō era), though its religious significance is deeply rooted in the migration of the Hata clan (秦氏, Hata-uji). The Hata were a prominent group of toraijin (immigrants from the Korean Peninsula) who settled in the Yamashiro Province during the Kofun period. Historical and genealogical records, such as the Shinsen Shōjiroku, suggest the clan migrated from the Korean kingdom of Silla or Paekche, bringing advanced continental technologies in irrigation, sericulture, and sake brewing to Japan.

According to the Yamashiro-no-kuni Fudoki, the shrine was established by Hata no Irogu (秦伊呂具). Legend states that Irogu, a wealthy landowner, shot an arrow at a mochi, which then transformed into a white bird and flew to the peak of Mount Inari; rice grew where the bird landed, leading Irogu to enshrine the deity there. The Hata clan's technical expertise in agriculture and their close ties to the Imperial Court allowed the Inari deity to transition from a private clan tutelary (ujigami) to a major national protector of the harvest and the state.

The shrine gained imperial patronage during the early Heian period. In 965, Emperor Murakami decreed that messengers carry written accounts of important events to the guardian kami of Japan. These heihaku were initially presented to 16 shrines, including the Inari Shrine.

From 1871 through 1946, Fushimi Inari-taisha was officially designated one of the Kanpei-taisha (官幣大社), meaning that it stood in the first rank of government supported shrines.

Unlike most Shinto shrines, Fushimi Inari-taisha, in keeping with typical Inari shrines, has an open view of the main object of worship (a mirror).

A drawing in Kiyoshi Nozaki's Kitsune: Japan's Fox of Mystery, Romance and Humor in 1786 depicting the shrine says that its two-story entry gate was built by Toyotomi Hideyoshi.

The shrine draws several million worshipers over the Japanese New Year, 2.69 million for 3 days in 2006 reported by the police, the most in western Japan.

=== Structures ===
The earliest structures were built in 711 on the Inariyama hill in southwestern Kyoto, but the shrine was re-located in 816 on the request of the monk Kūkai. The main shrine structure was built in 1499. At the bottom of the hill are the main gate (楼門; rōmon, "tower gate") and the main shrine (御本殿; go-honden). Behind them, in the middle of the mountain, the inner shrine (奥宮; okumiya) is reachable by a path lined with thousands of torii. On the way to the top of the mountain are tens of thousands of rock altars (otsuka お塚) for private worship. These rock altars are personalised Inari that have been set up there by citizens. Most of them have individual names for Inari engraved on them.

==== Senbon Torii ====
The highlight of the shrine is the rows of torii gates, known as Senbon torii (千本鳥居), "thousand torii". The custom to donate a torii began spreading from the Edo period (1603–1868) to have a wish come true or in gratitude for a wish that came true, with successive gates being added up to the present day by donors out of gratitude. Along the main path there are around 800 torii gates.

== Access and environs ==
Walking up part of the torii path

The shrine is just outside Inari Station on the Nara Line of the West Japan Railway Company (JR), a five-minute ride from Kyoto Station. It is a short walk from Fushimi-Inari Station on the Main Line of the Keihan Electric Railway.

The shrine is open 24 hours with the approach to the shrine and the Honden (本殿, main hall) itself illuminated all night. There is no entrance fee.

In the approach to the shrine are a number of sweet shops selling tsujiura senbei (辻占煎餅), a form of fortune cookie dating at least to the 19th century, and which are believed by some to be the origin of the American fortune cookie.

== In popular culture ==
- High School Inari Tamamo-chan, where the main character a fox spirit came from along with her siblings.
- A part of the Noh play Kokaji takes place in Fushimi Inari-taisha.
- The shrine inspired Nintendo game designer, Shigeru Miyamoto, to create the series Star Fox. In the series, players control Fox McCloud and fly starfighters through colorful rings in aerial combat. Miyamoto attributed these inspirations to the Fushimi Inari Shrine, which is within walking distance of the Nintendo Kyoto campus.

== Gallery ==
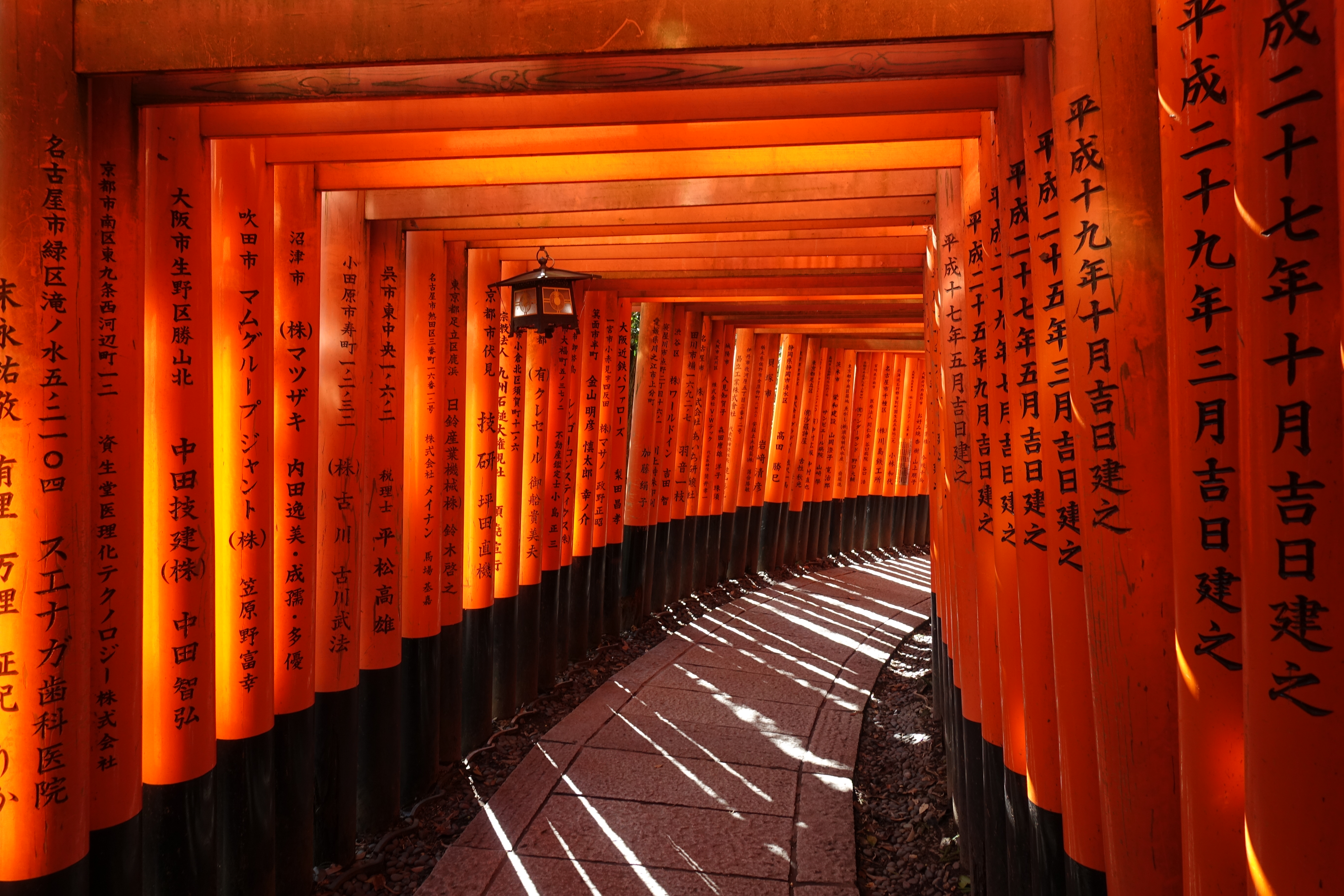
View of the south-western wing of Senbon Torii path.

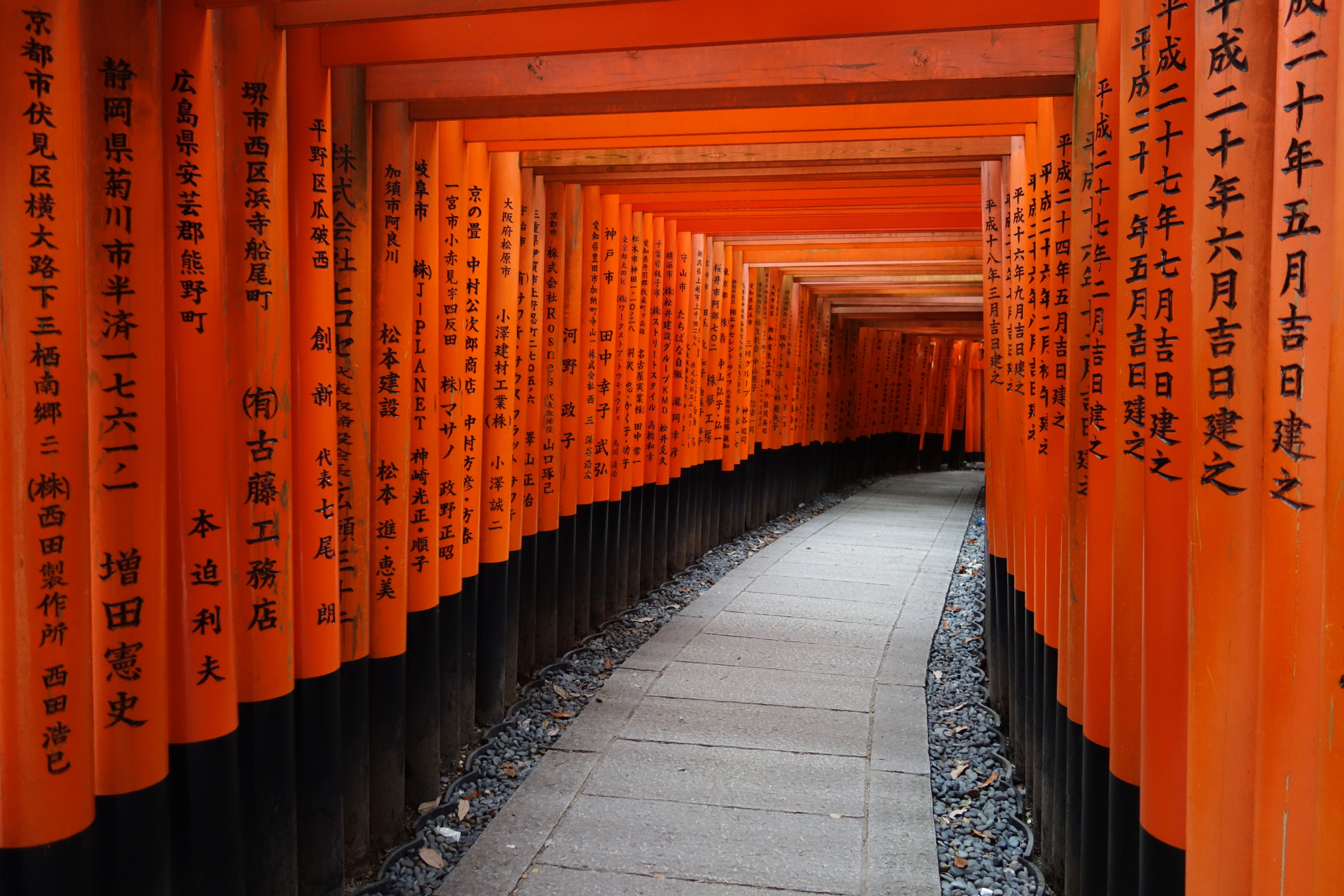
View of the north-eastern wing of Senbon Torii path.

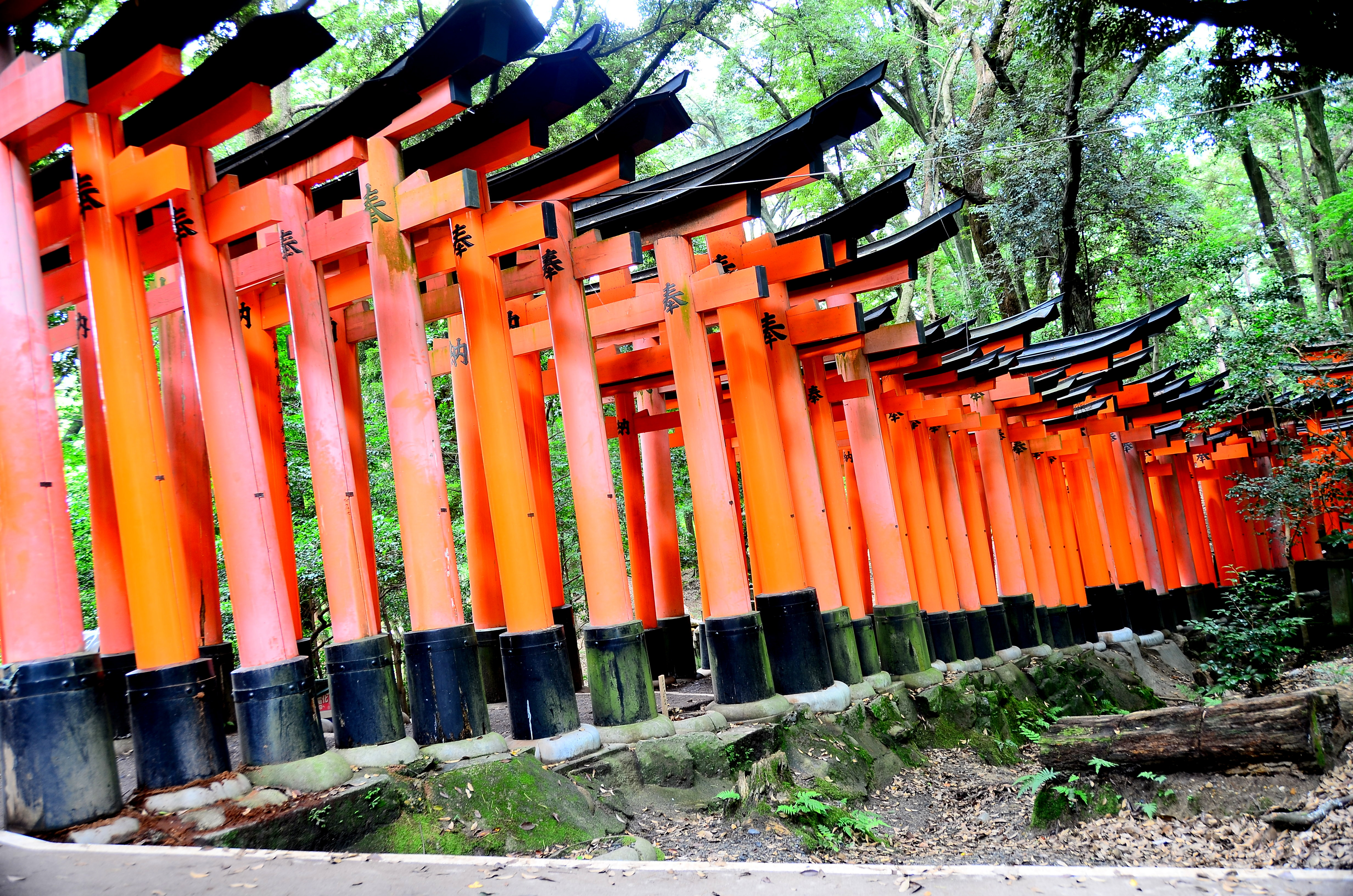
A torii path across the mountain from the side

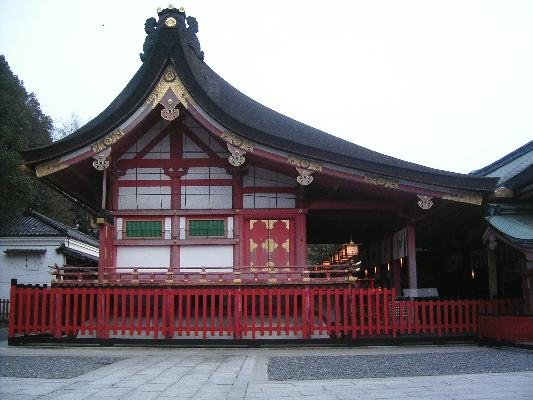
A honden

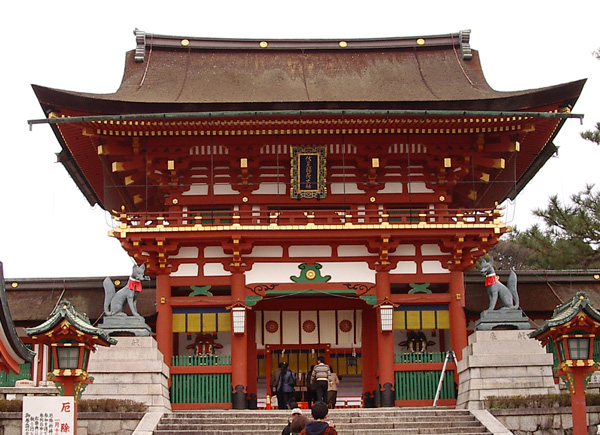
楼門, rōmon, tower gate (main gate)

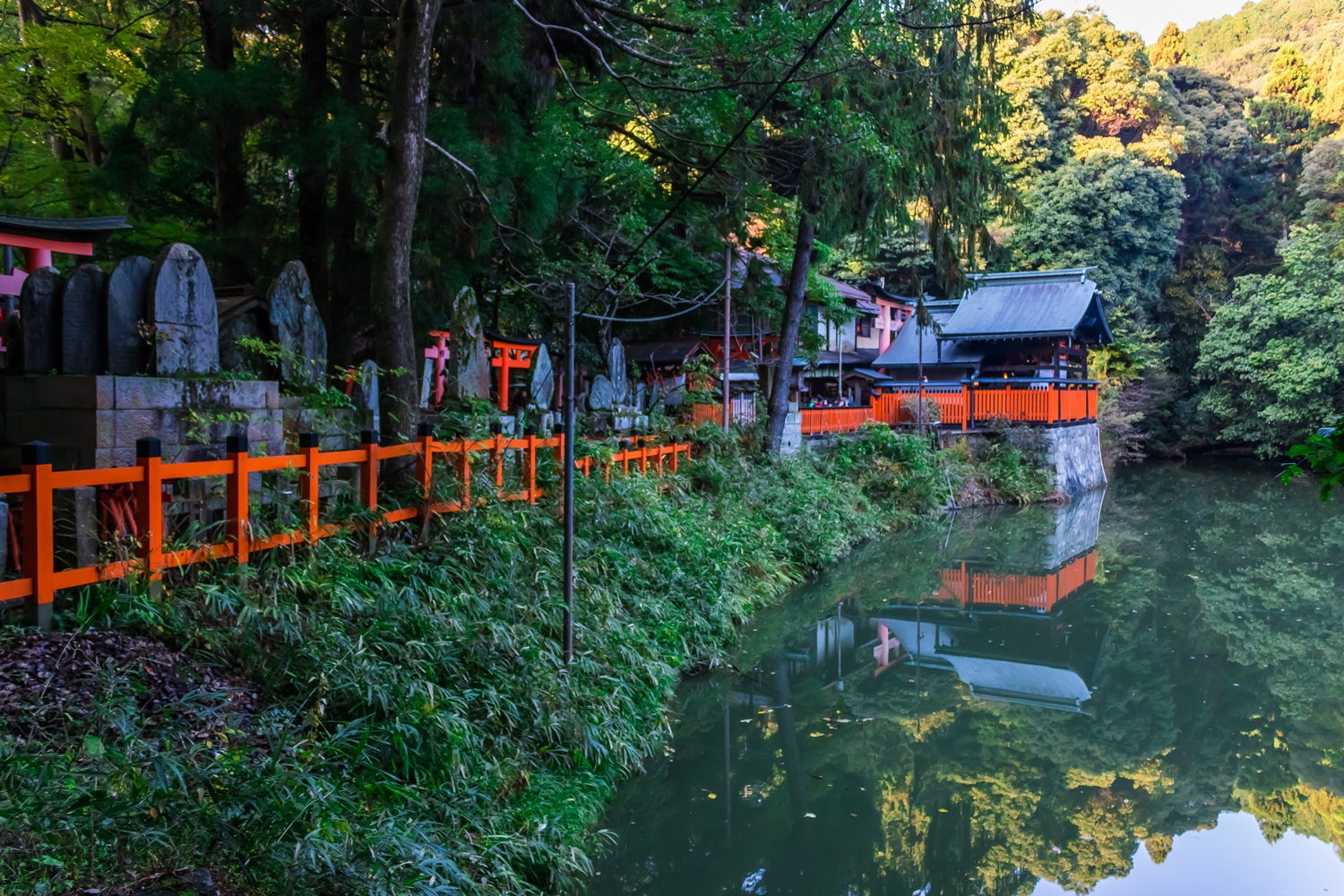

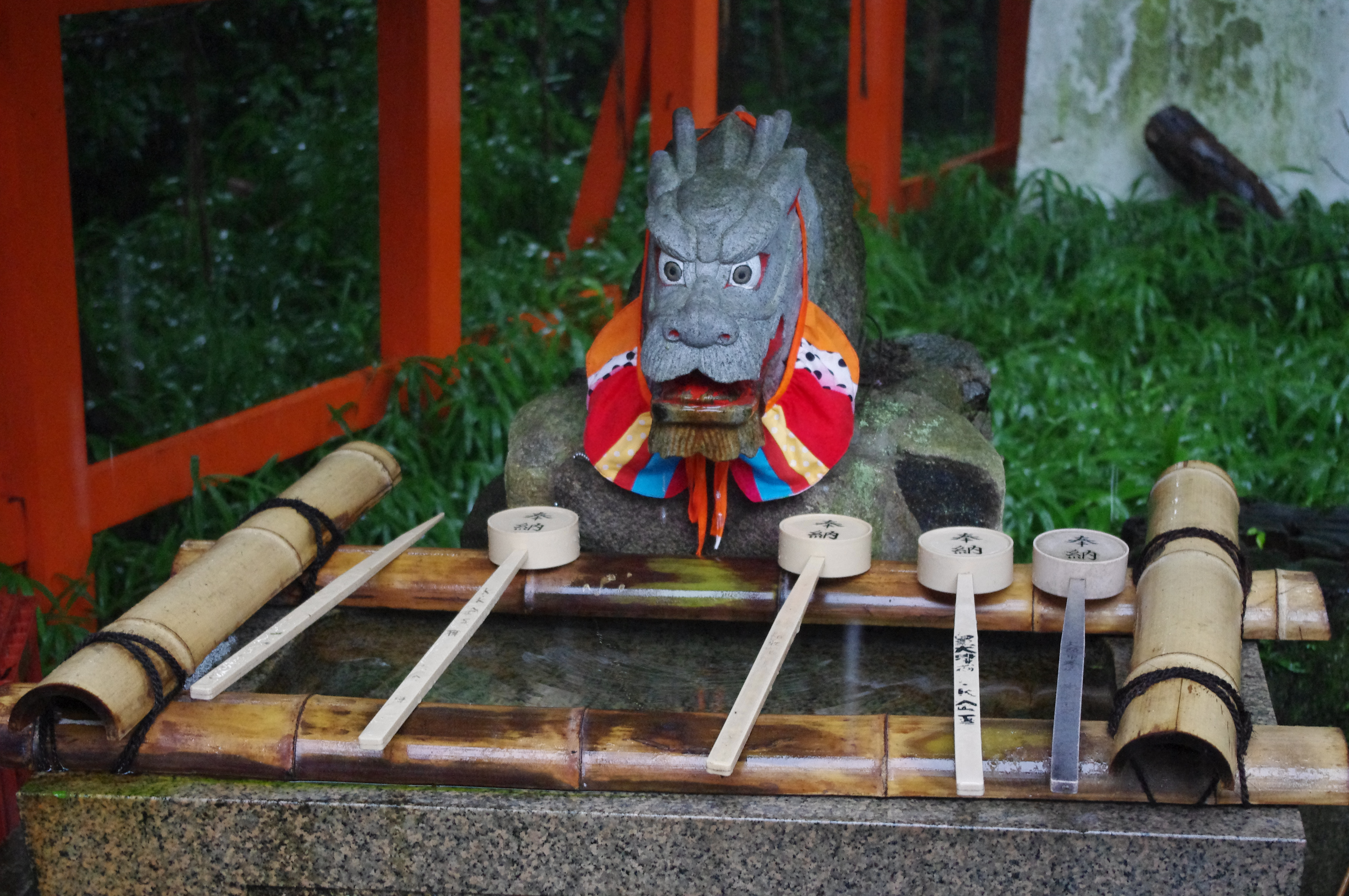

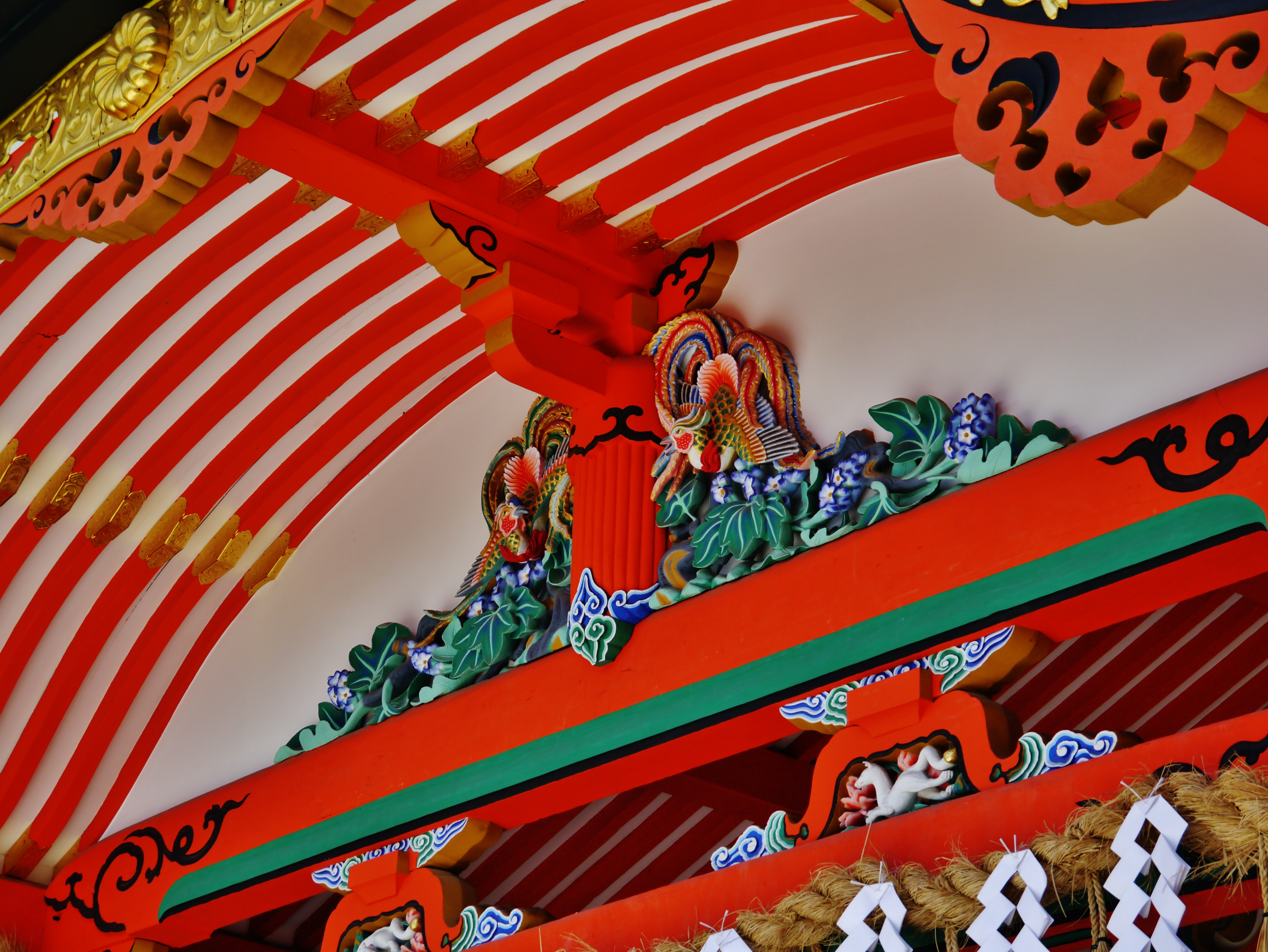

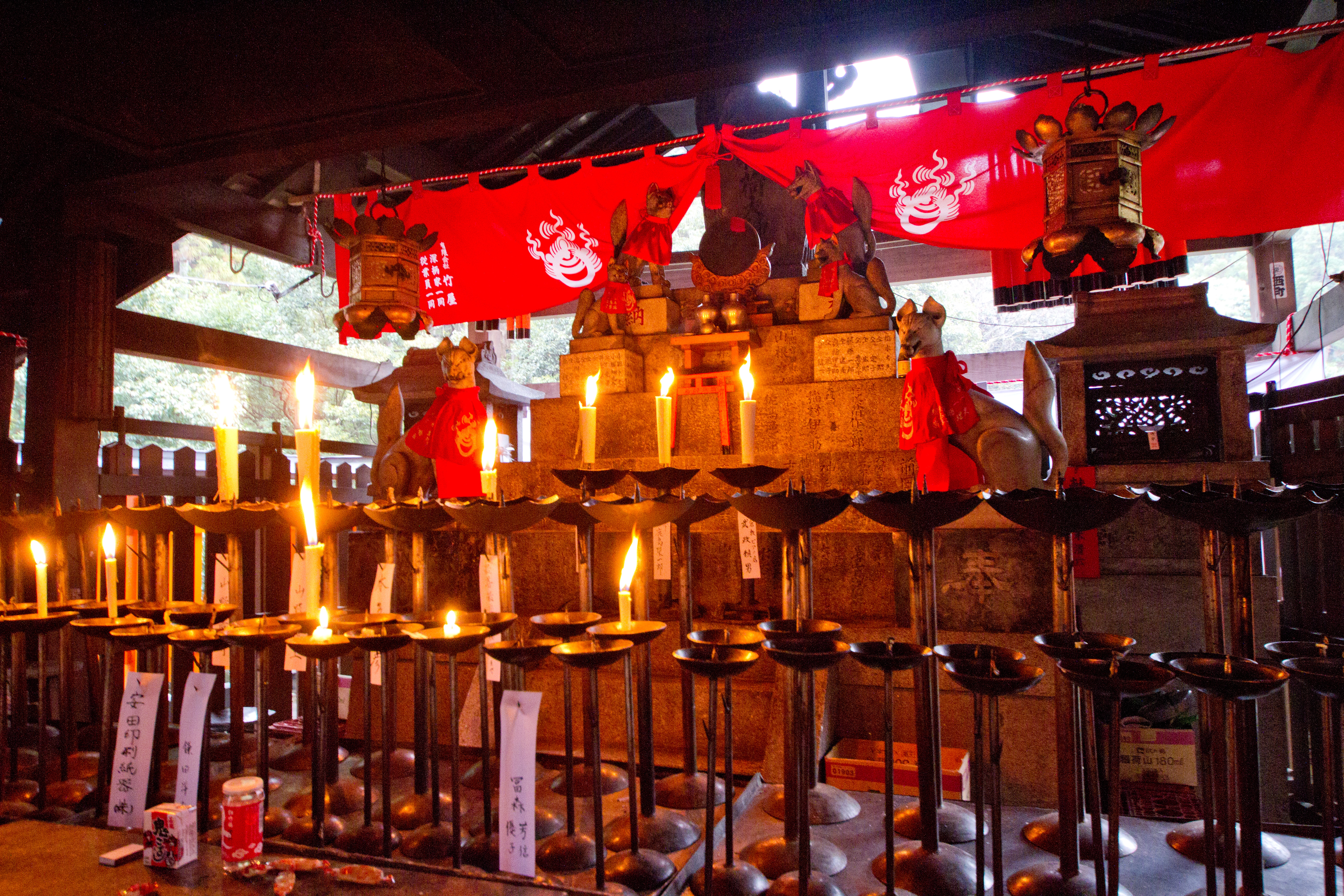

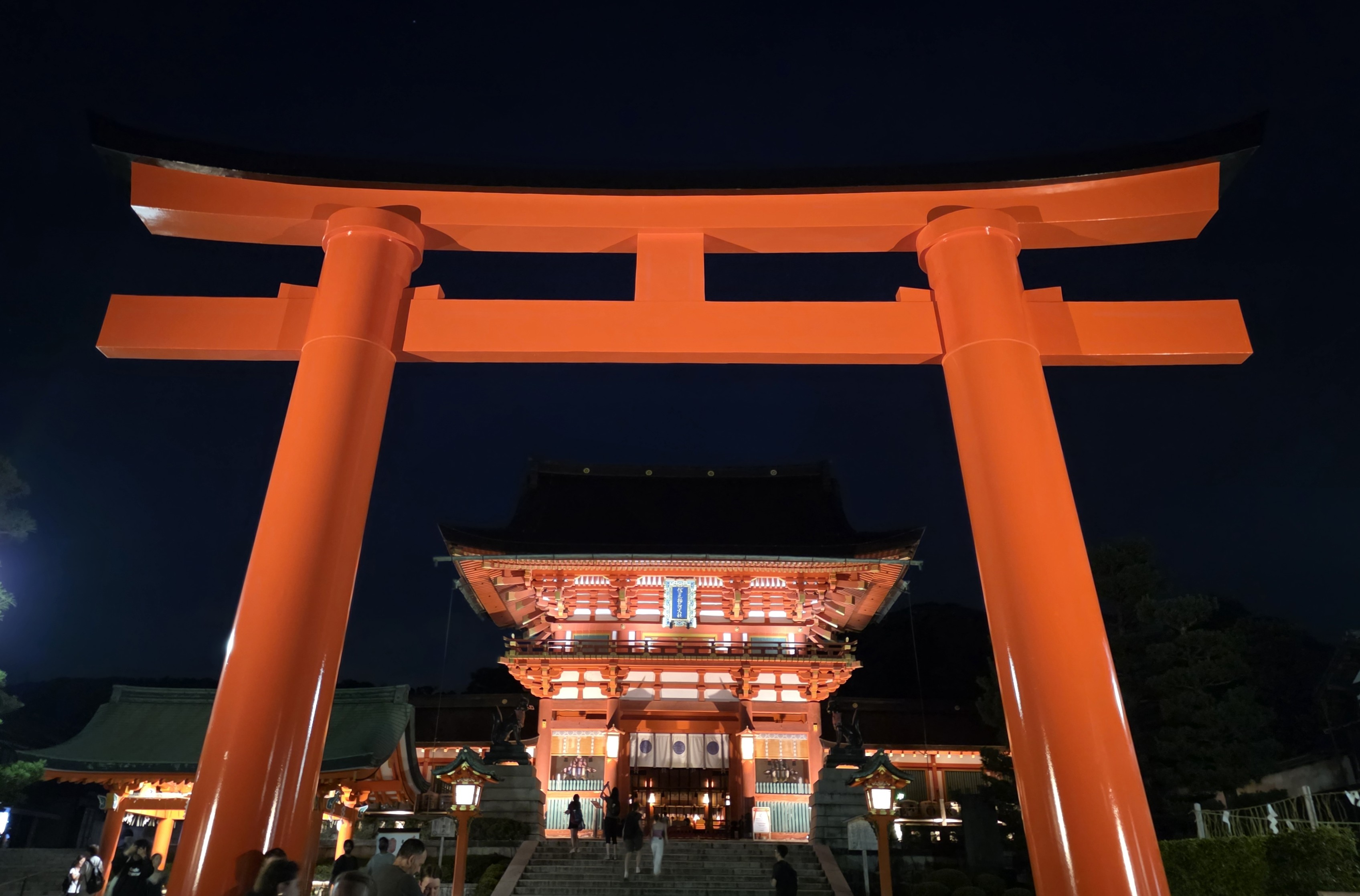

=== Fox ===
Foxes (kitsune), regarded as the messengers, are often found in Inari shrines. One attribute is a key (for the rice granary) in their mouths.

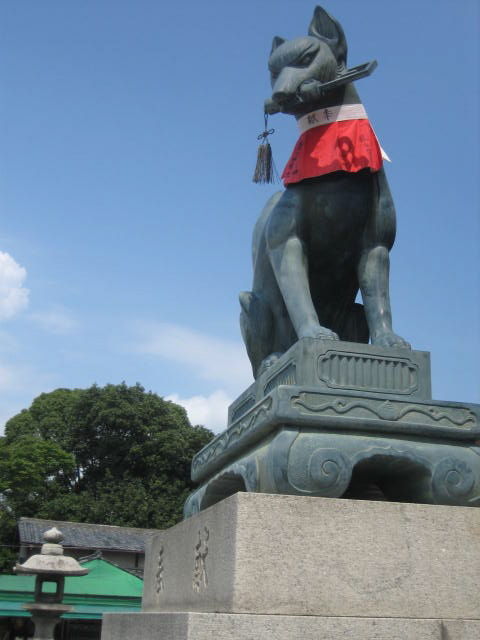
Fox holding a key in its mouth, at the main gate of the Fushimi Inari shrine

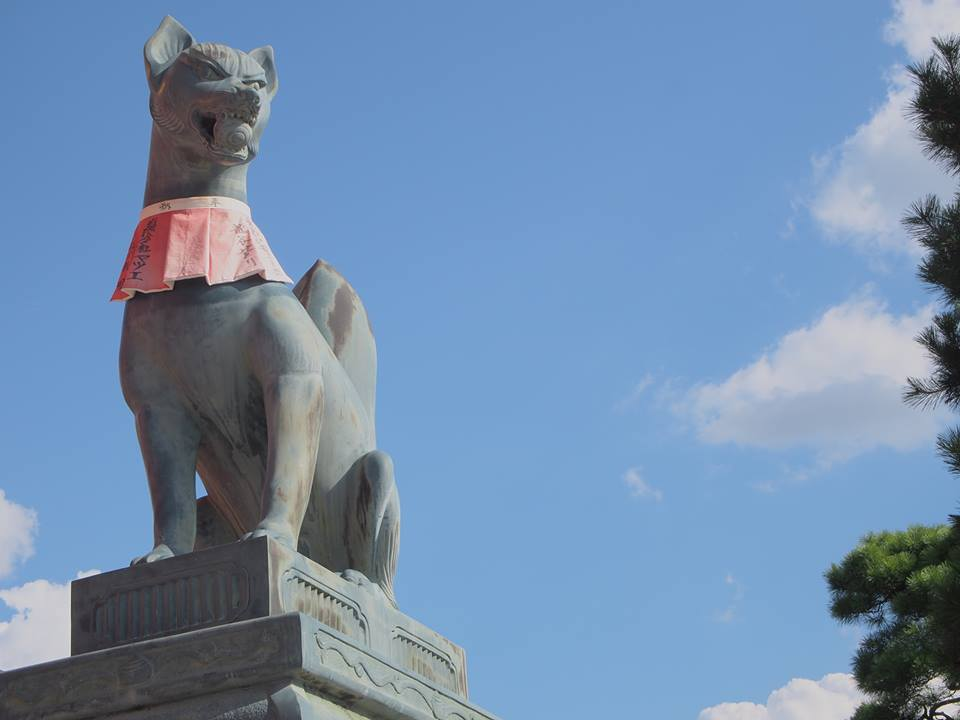
Fox holding a jewel in its mouth at the main gate of the Fushimi Inari shrine

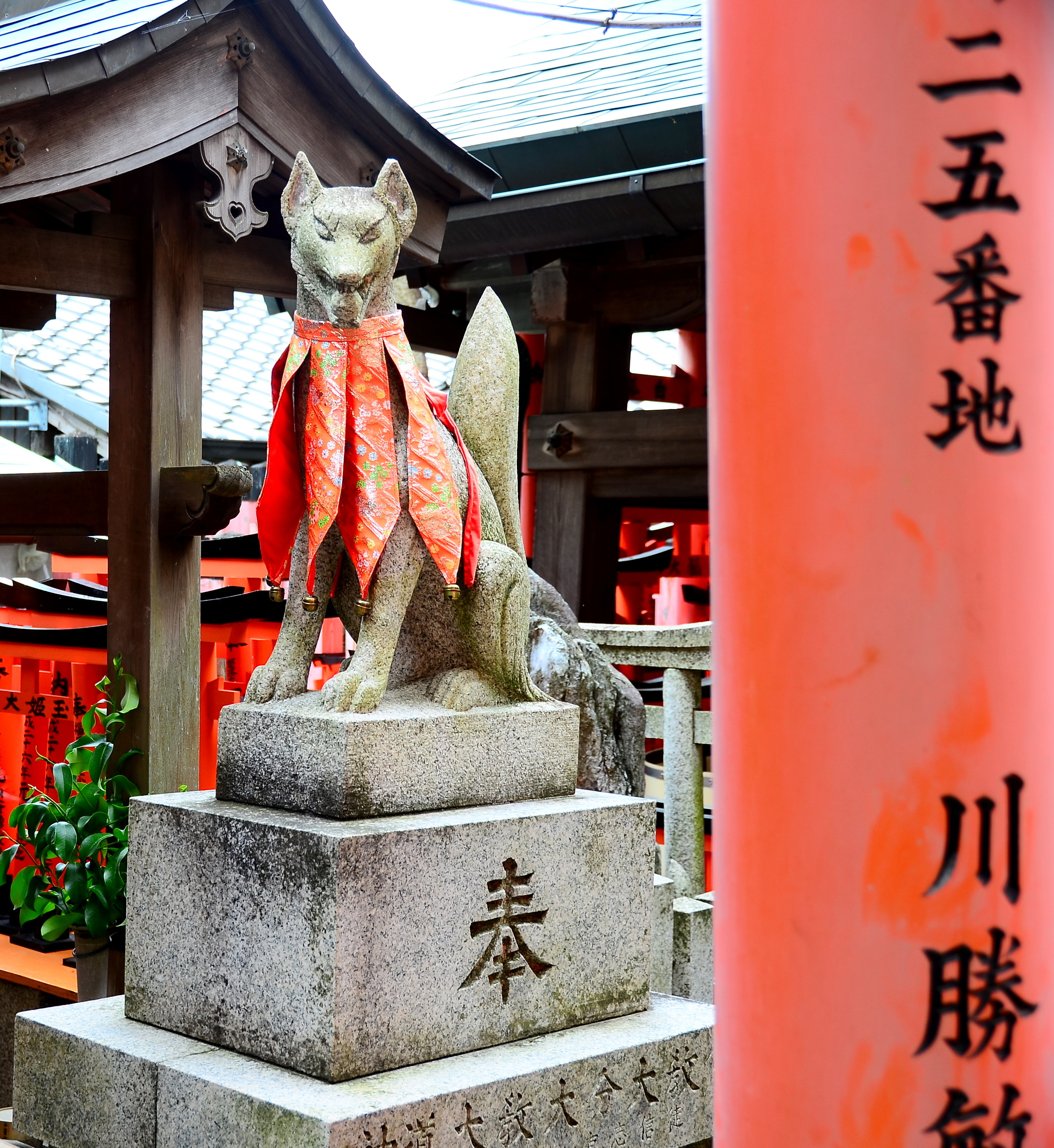
Fox sculpture in Fushimi Inari-taisha shrine

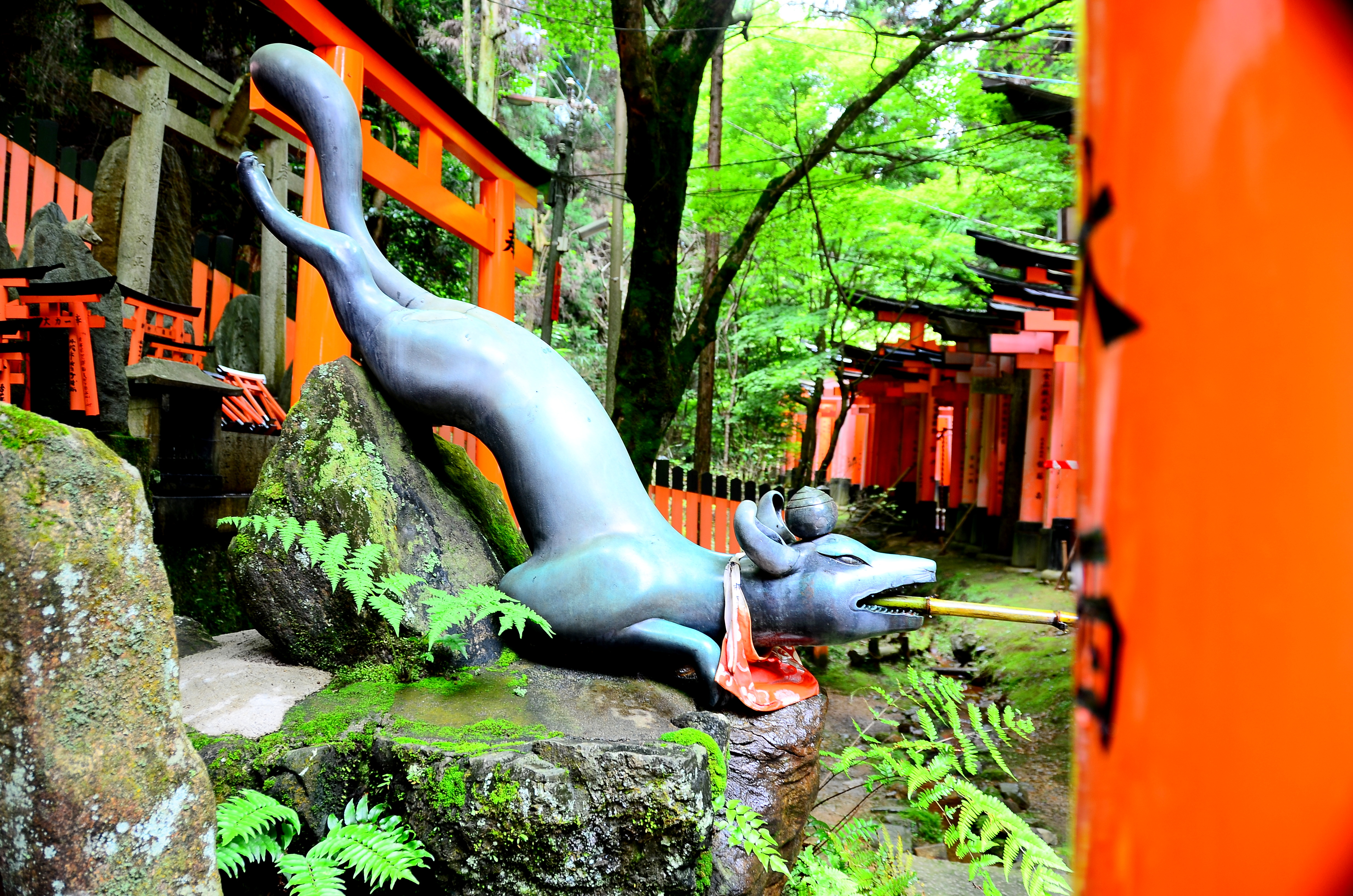
Fox fountain in Fushimi Inari-taisha shrine

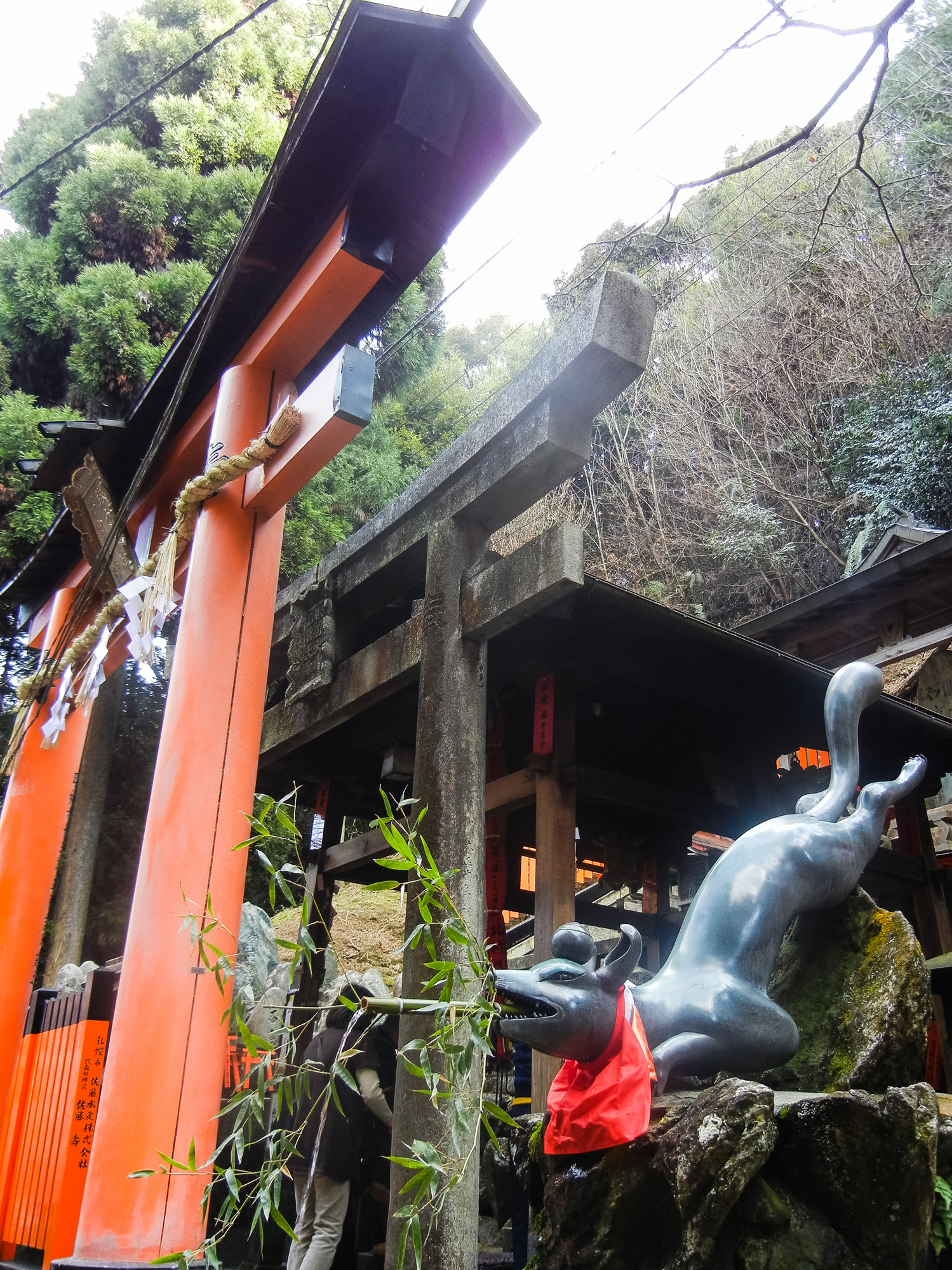
Another view of the fox fountain

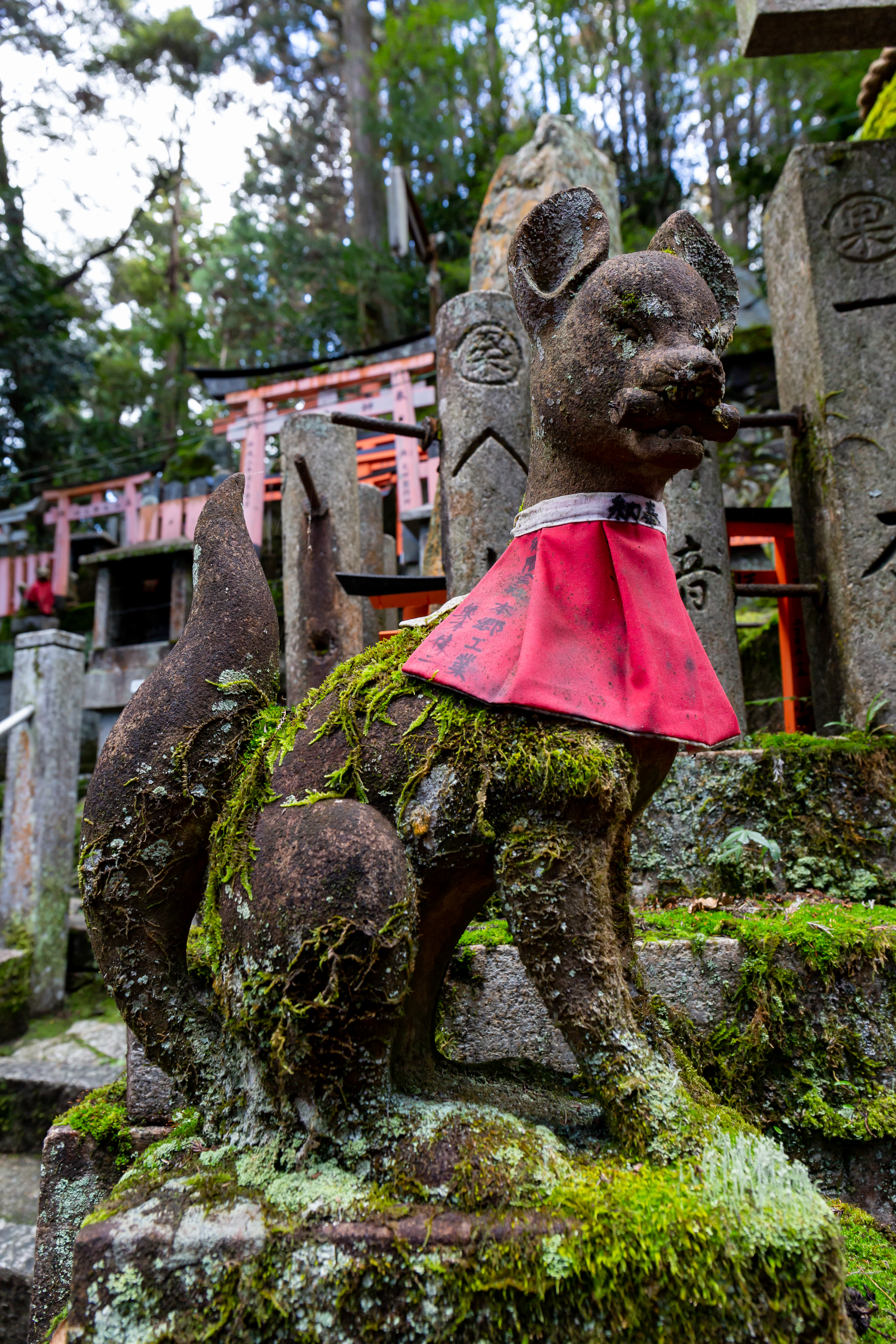
Fox altar in Fushimi Inari-taisha shrine

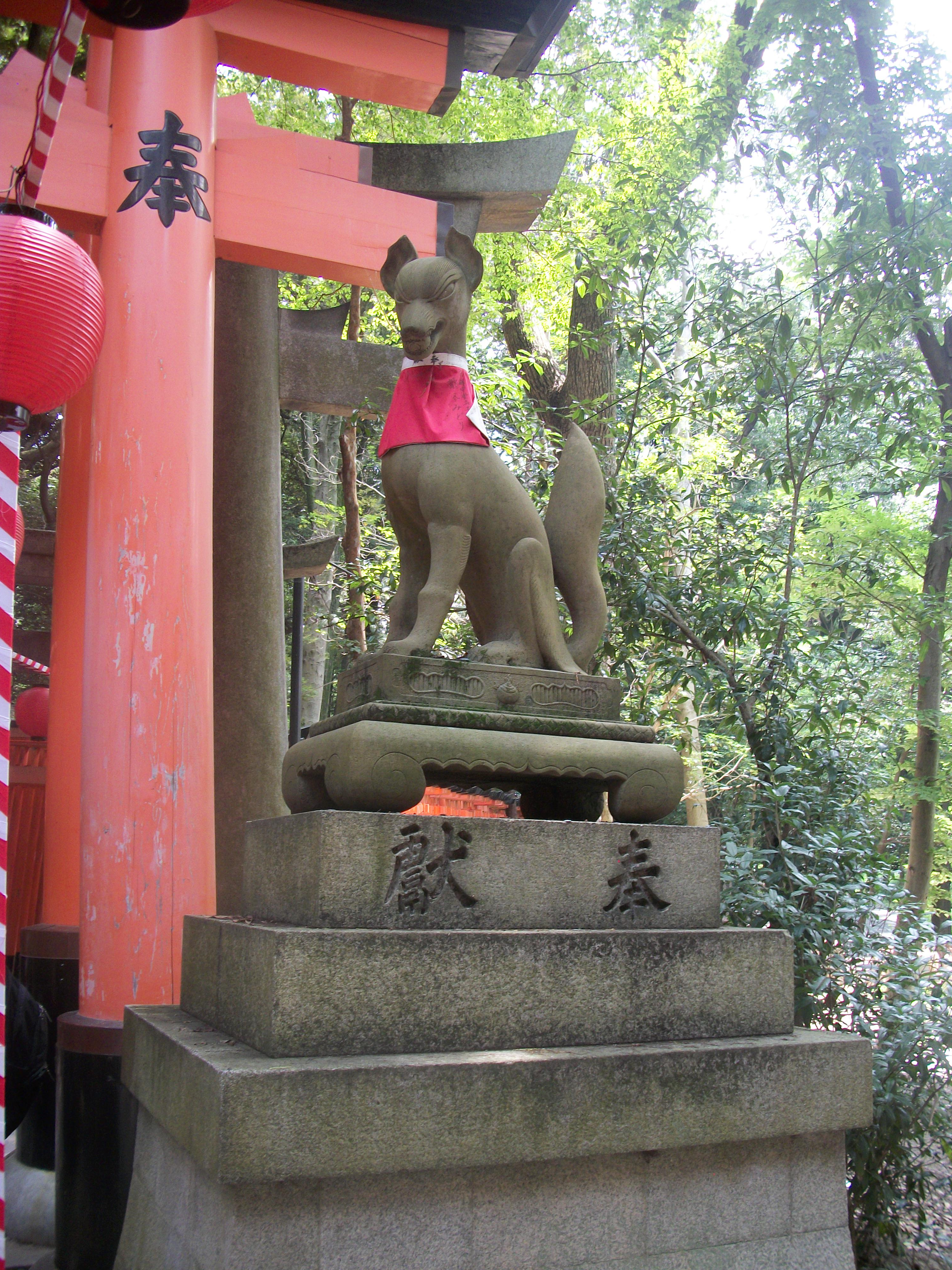
Kitsune statue in the Senbon Torii

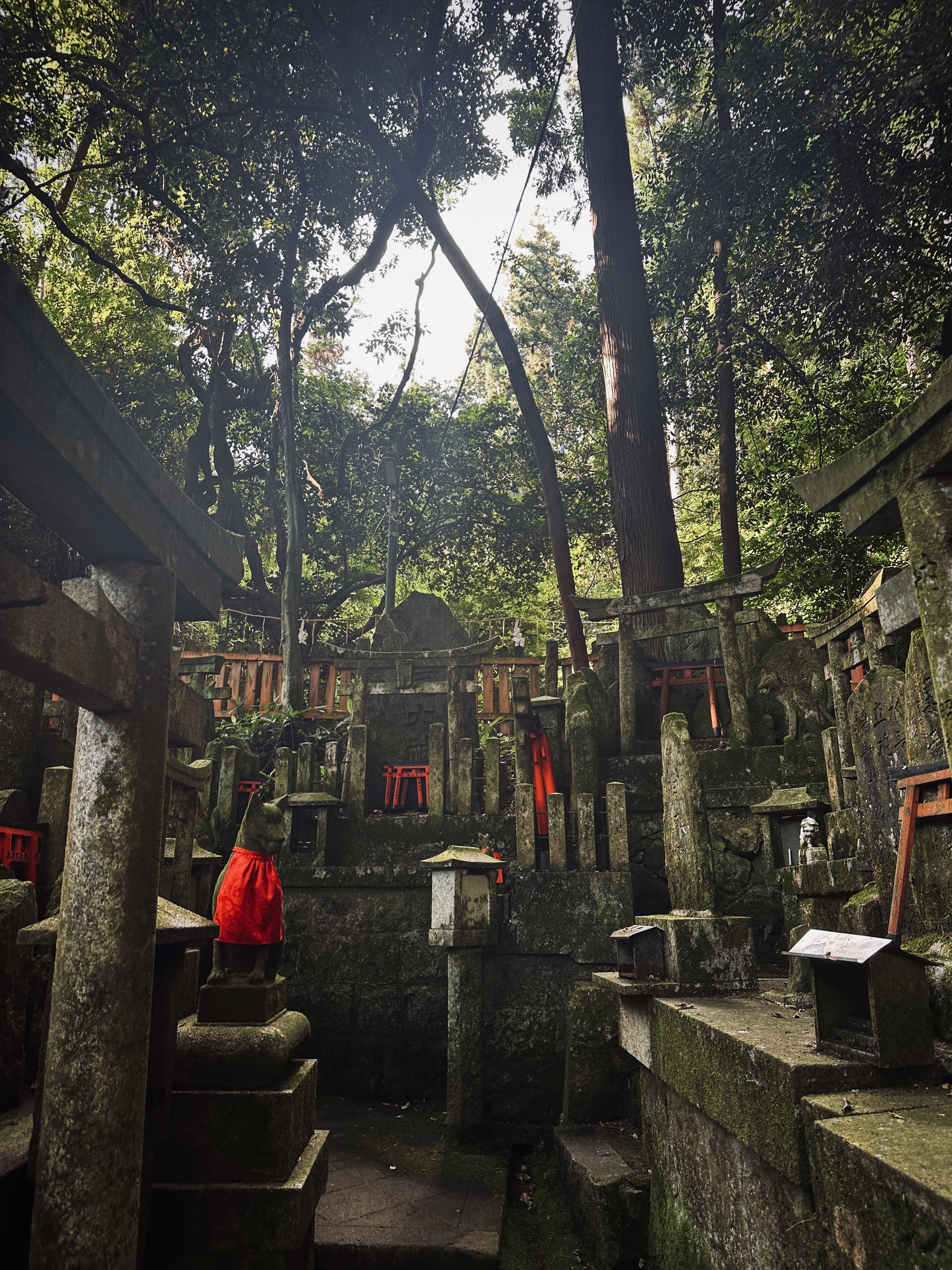
Fox guardian at the Fushimi Inari shrine.

== See also ==
- List of Shinto shrines
- Modern system of ranked Shinto shrines
- Twenty-Two Shrines
