= Shichijō Station =

Railway station in Kyoto, Japan

Shichijō Station 七条駅
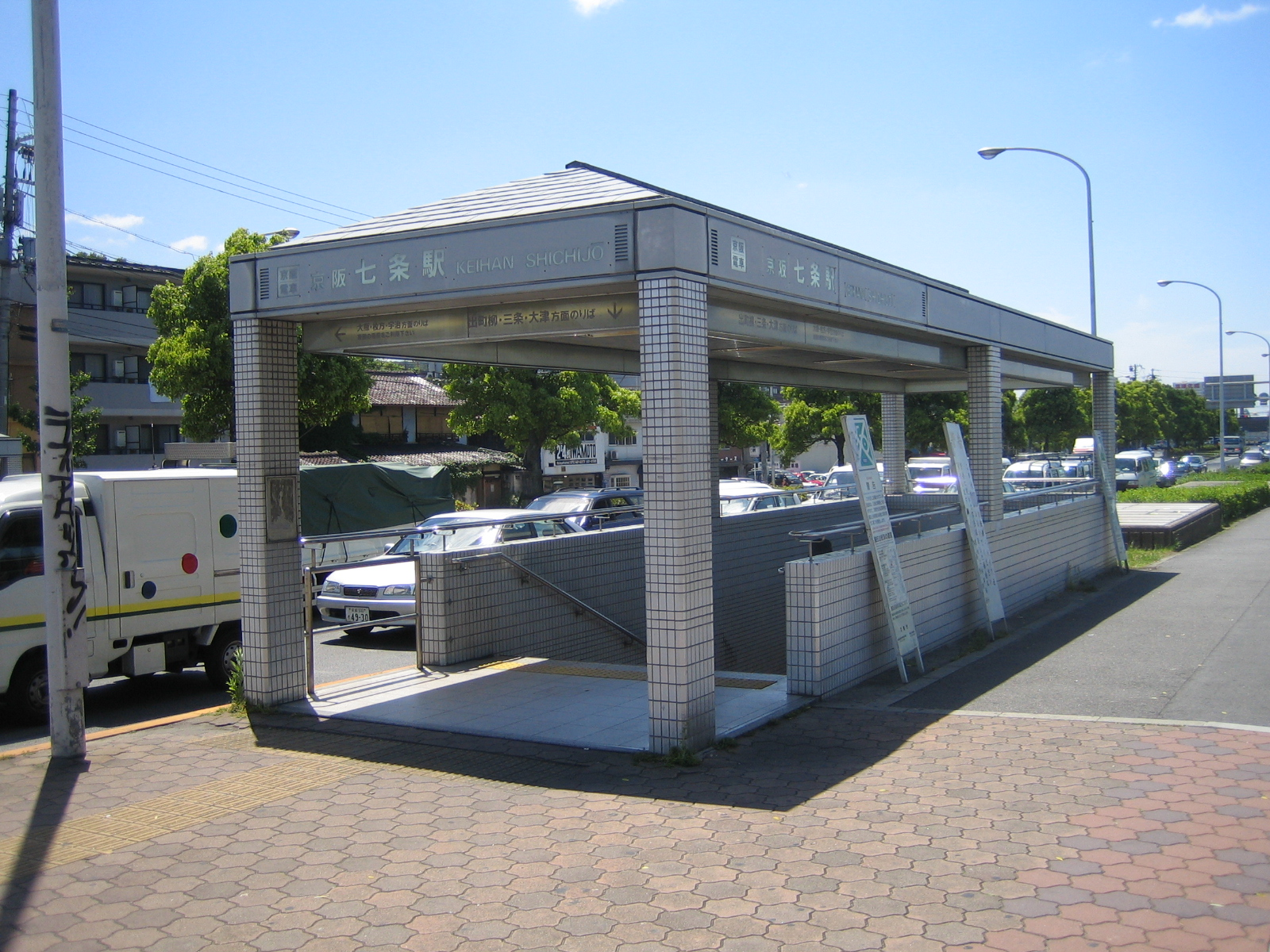
- Shichijō Station, May 2005

General information
- Location: Shimohoritsumecho, Higashiyama, Kyoto, Kyoto （京都市東山区下堀詰町） Japan
- Coordinates: 34°59′21.56″N 135°46′4.25″E
- Operator: Keihan Electric Railway
- Line: Keihan Main Line

History
- Opened: 1913; 113 years ago

Passengers
- FY2015: 6.5 million
Location

Shichijō Station (七条駅, Shichijō-eki) is a railway station located in the Higashiyama-ku, city of Kyoto, Kyoto Prefecture, Japan.

== Line ==
- Keihan Electric Railway Keihan Main Line

== Layout ==
The underground station has two side platforms.

| 1 | ■ Keihan Line | for Sanjo and Demachiyanagi |
| 2 | ■ Keihan Line | for Chushojima, Yodoyabashi, and Nakanoshima |

== Surroundings ==
- Kyoto National Museum
- Sanjūsangen-dō
- Hōjūjidono
- Toyokuni Shrine (Kyoto)
- Hōkō-ji (Kyoto)
- Kyoto Station
- Suzin Conference

== Adjacent stations ==
| « | Service | » |
Keihan Railway
Keihan Main Line
| Tōfukuji | Local | Kiyomizu-Gojō |
| Tōfukuji | Sub Express; Commuter Sub Express (only running for Yodoyabashi or Nakanoshima in the morning on weekdays) | Kiyomizu-Gojō |
| Fushimi-Inari | Express | Kiyomizu-Gojō |
| Tambabashi | Rapid Express; Commuter Rapid Express (only running for Nakanoshima in the morning on weekdays) | Gion-Shijō |
| Tambabashi | Limited Express | Gion-Shijō |
| Kyōbashi | Rapid Limited Express (on Saturdays, Sundays and holidays during the tourist seasons and new year period) | Gion-Shijō |
