= List of places of scenic beauty of Japan (Kyoto) =

This list is of the places of scenic beauty of Japan located within the Urban Prefecture of Kyōto.

== National Places of Scenic Beauty ==
As of 2 July 2026, sixty-two Places have been designated at a national level (including fourteen *Special Places of Scenic Beauty).

Site	Municipality	Comments	Image	Coordinates	Type	Ref.
*Konchi-in Gardens 金地院庭園; Konchi-in teien	Kyōto	subtemple of Nanzen-ji		35°00′36″N 135°47′27″E	1	
*Ginkaku-ji Gardens 慈照寺（銀閣寺）庭園; Jishōji (Ginkakuji) teien	Kyōto	also a Special Historic Site		35°01′36″N 135°47′54″E	1	
*Kinkaku-ji Gardens 鹿苑寺（金閣寺）庭園; Rokuonji (Kinkakuji) teien	Kyōto	also a Special Historic Site		35°02′23″N 135°43′43″E	1	
*Jōruri-ji Gardens 浄瑠璃寺庭園; Jōruriji teien	Kizugawa	also an Historic Site		34°42′56″N 135°52′24″E	1	
*Saihō-ji Gardens 西芳寺庭園; Saihōji teien	Kyōto	also an Historic Site		34°59′33″N 135°41′04″E	1	
*Daisen-in Shoin Gardens 大仙院書院庭園; Daisen-in shoin teien	Kyōto	also an Historic Site; subtemple of Daitoku-ji		35°02′41″N 135°44′44″E	1	
*Daitoku-ji Hōjō Gardens 大徳寺方丈庭園; Daitokuji hōjō teien	Kyōto	also an Historic Site		35°02′38″N 135°44′46″E	1	
*Daigo-ji Sanbō-in Gardens 醍醐寺三宝院庭園; Daigoji Sanbō-in teien	Kyōto	also a Special Historic Site		34°57′07″N 135°49′10″E	1	
*Amanohashidate 天橋立; Amanohashidate	Miyazu	one of the Three Views of Japan; within Tango-Amanohashidate-Ōeyama Quasi-National Park		35°34′11″N 135°11′30″E	3, 8, 11	
*Tenryū-ji Gardens 天龍寺庭園; Tenryūji teien	Kyōto	also an Historic Site		35°00′57″N 135°40′23″E	1	
*Nijō-jō Ninomaru Gardens 二条城二之丸庭園; Nijō-jō ninomaru teien	Kyōto			35°00′49″N 135°44′57″E	1	
*Hōkongō-in Seijō-no-taki - Goisan 法金剛院青女滝附五位山; Hōkongō-in Seijō-no-taki tsuketari Goi-san	Kyōto			35°01′09″N 135°42′58″E	1, 10	
*Hongan-ji Ōshoin Gardens 本願寺大書院庭園; Honganji ōshoin teien	Kyōto	also an Historic Site		34°59′27″N 135°45′05″E	1	
*Ryōan-ji Hōjō Gardens 龍安寺方丈庭園; Ryōanji hōjō teien	Kyōto	also an Historic Site		35°02′04″N 135°43′05″E	1	
Maruyama Park 円山公園; Maruyama kōen	Kyōto			35°00′14″N 135°46′49″E	1	
Entsū-ji Gardens 円通寺庭園; Entsūji teien	Kyōto			35°03′52″N 135°46′08″E	1	
Ennan Gardens 燕庵庭園; Ennan teien	Kyōto			34°59′27″N 135°45′18″E	1	
Mount Kasagi 笠置山; Kasagi-yama	Kasagi	also an Historic Site; in Kasagiyama Prefectural Natural Park		34°45′24″N 135°56′38″E	5, 6	
Entoku-in Gardens 旧円徳院庭園; Entoku-in teien	Kyōto			35°00′02″N 135°46′46″E	1	
Gyokuhō-in Gardens 玉鳳院庭園; Gyokuhō-in teien	Kyōto	also an Historic Site; subtemple of Myōshin-ji		35°01′21″N 135°43′18″E	1	
Kotohiki Beach 琴引浜; Kotohiki-hama	Kyōtango	also a Natural Monument		35°42′14″N 135°02′47″E	8	
Keishun-in Gardens 桂春院庭園; Keishun-in teien	Kyōto	also an Historic Site; subtemple of Myōshin-ji		35°01′29″N 135°43′21″E	1	
Kohō-an Gardens 孤篷庵庭園; Kohōan teien	Kyōto	also an Historic Site		35°02′35″N 135°44′23″E	1	
Omuro 御室（サクラ） Omuro (sakura)	Kyōto			35°01′47″N 135°42′48″E	3	
Kōdai-ji Gardens 高台寺庭園; Kōdaiji teien	Kyōto	also an Historic Site		35°00′03″N 135°46′55″E	1	
Konnichi-an Gardens 今日庵（裏千家）庭園; Konnichian (Urasenke) teien	Kyōto	Urasenke tea room		35°02′04″N 135°45′14″E	1	
Shūon-an Gardens 酬恩庵庭園; Shūonan teien	Kyōtanabe			34°49′15″N 135°45′28″E	1	
Shōsei-en 渉成園; Shōsei-en	Kyōto			34°59′29″N 135°45′47″E	1	
Shōfuku-ji Gardens 照福寺庭園; Shōfukuji teien	Ayabe			35°17′47″N 135°18′52″E	1	
Shinju-an Gardens 真珠庵庭園; Shinjuan teien	Kyōto	also an Historic Site		35°02′39″N 135°44′48″E	1	
Sugimoto Family Gardens 杉本氏庭園; Sugimoto-shi teien	Kyōto			35°00′10″N 135°45′21″E	1	
Jōju-in Gardens 成就院庭園; Jōju-in teien	Kyōto	subtemple of Kiyomizu-dera		34°59′46″N 135°47′05″E	1	
Seifūsō Gardens 清風荘庭園; Seifūsō teien	Kyōto			35°01′45″N 135°46′34″E	1	
Taizō-in Gardens 退蔵院庭園; Taizō-in teien	Kyōto	also an Historic Site; subtemple of Myōshin-ji		35°01′19″N 135°43′09″E	1	
Daisen-in Gardens 大仙院庭園; Daisen-in teien	Kyōto	subtemple of Daitoku-ji		35°02′40″N 135°44′44″E	1	
Ōsawa Pond-Nakoso Falls Site 大沢池附名古曽滝跡; Ōsawa-ike tsuketari Nakoso-no-taki ato	Kyōto	in the grounds of Daikaku-ji		35°01′42″N 135°40′49″E	1	
Chisaku-in Gardens 智積院庭園; Chisaku-in teien	Kyōto			34°59′20″N 135°46′33″E	1	
Tekisu-en 滴翠園; Tekisu-en	Kyōto	in the grounds of Nishi Honganji		34°59′27″N 135°45′08″E	1	
Tōkai-an Shoin Gardens 東海庵書院庭園; Tōkai-an shoin teien	Kyōto	also an Historic Site; subtemple of Myōshin-ji		35°01′22″N 135°43′14″E	1	
Nanzen-in Gardens 南禅院庭園; Nanzen-in teien	Kyōto	also an Historic Site		35°00′36″N 135°47′37″E	1	
Nanzen-ji Hōjō Gardens 南禅寺方丈庭園; Nanzenji hōjō teien	Kyōto			35°00′40″N 135°47′39″E	1	
Hakusasonsō Gardens 白沙村荘庭園; Hakusansō teien	Kyōto			35°01′37″N 135°47′37″E	1	
Fushin-an (Omotesenke) Gardens 不審庵（表千家）庭園; Fushin-an (Omotesenke) teien	Kyōto			35°02′03″N 135°45′13″E	1	
Heian Jingū Gardens 平安神宮神苑; Heian Jingū jinen	Kyōto			35°00′58″N 135°46′57″E	1	
Byōdō-in Gardens 平等院庭園; Byōdō-in teien	Uji	also an Historic Site		34°53′21″N 135°48′30″E	1	
Honpō-ji Gardens 本法寺庭園; Honpōji teien	Kyōto			35°02′06″N 135°45′10″E	1	
Myōshin-ji Gardens 妙心寺庭園; Myōshinji teien	Kyōto	also an Historic Site		35°01′19″N 135°43′12″E	1	
Murin-an Gardens 無鄰庵庭園; Murin-an teien	Kyōto			35°00′42″N 135°47′14″E	1	
Arashiyama 嵐山; Arashiyama	Kyōto	also an Historic Site		35°00′35″N 135°40′03″E	1, 2, 4, 6	
Rurikei 琉璃溪; Rurikei	Nantan			35°02′09″N 135°24′17″E	5, 6	
Ryōan-ji Gardens 龍安寺庭園; Ryōanji teien	Kyōto			35°02′00″N 135°43′07″E	1	
Reiun-in Gardens 霊雲院庭園; Reiun-in teien	Kyōto	also an Historic Site; subtemple of Myōshin-ji		35°01′23″N 135°43′09″E	1	
Reitō-in Gardens 霊洞院庭園; Reitō-in teien	Kyōto	subtemple of Kennin-ji		34°59′57″N 135°46′31″E	1	
Narabigaoka 雙ヶ岡; Narabigaoka	Kyōto			35°01′16″N 135°42′49″E	11	
Manshu-in Shoin Gardens 曼殊院書院庭園; Manshu-in shoin teien	Kyōto			35°02′56″N 135°48′11″E	1	
Tairyūsansō Gardens 對龍山荘庭園; Tairyūsansō teien	Kyōto			35°00′39″N 135°47′24″E	1	
Jukō-in Gardens 聚光院庭園; Jukō-in teien	Kyōto	subtemple of Daitoku-ji		35°02′38″N 135°44′43″E	1	
Shōka-dō and Shoin Gardens 松花堂及び書院庭園; Shōkadō oyobi shoin teien	Yawata			34°52′45″N 135°42′06″E	1	
Tōfuku-ji Honbō Gardens 東福寺本坊庭園; Tōfukuji honbō teien	Kyōto			34°58′36″N 135°46′28″E	1	
Uji Mountains 宇治山; Uji-yama	Uji			34°53′33″N 135°48′46″E	10	
Chion-in Hōjō Gardens 知恩院方丈庭園; Chion-in hōjō teien	Kyōto			35°00′21″N 135°47′04″E	1	
Ninna-ji Palace Gardens 仁和寺御所庭園; Ninnaji gosho teien	Kyōto			35°01′46″N 135°42′46″E	1	

== Prefectural Places of Scenic Beauty ==
As of 1 May 2025, twenty-one Places have been designated at a prefectural level.

Site	Municipality	Comments	Image	Coordinates	Type	Ref.
Ryōsoku-in Gardens 両足院庭園; Ryōsoku-in teien	Kyōto	subtemple of Kennin-ji		35°00′00″N 135°46′28″E		for all refs see
Yōkoku-ji Gardens 楊谷寺庭園; Yōkokuji teien	Nagaokakyō			34°54′51″N 135°39′09″E		
Myōki-an Gardens 妙喜庵庭園; Myōki-an teien	Ōyamazaki			34°53′32″N 135°40′49″E		
Kōshō-ji Gardens 興聖寺庭園及び琴坂; Kōshōji teien oyobi Kotosaka	Uji			34°53′24″N 135°48′50″E		
Yūrin-an Shoin Gardens 養林庵書院庭園; Yūrinan shoin teien	Uji	subtemple of Byōdō-in		34°53′19″N 135°48′25″E		
Nakamura Tōkichi Family Gardens 中村藤吉家庭園; Nakamura Tōkichi-ke teien	Uji					
Kanbayashi Shunshō Family Gardens 上林春松家庭園; Kanbayashi Shunshō teien	Uji					
Shōbō-ji Gardens 正法寺庭園; Shōbōji teien	Yawata			34°52′13″N 135°42′04″E		
Anao-ji Gardens 穴太寺庭園; Anaoji teien	Kameoka			35°00′23″N 135°32′58″E		
Hōjō-ji Gardens 法常寺庭園; Hōjōji teien	Kameoka			35°00′54″N 135°26′39″E		
Ryōtan-ji Gardens 龍潭寺庭園; Ryōtanji teien	Kameoka			35°01′37″N 135°32′30″E		
Shōreki-ji Gardens 正暦寺庭園; Shōrekiji teien	Ayabe			35°17′32″N 135°15′46″E		
Kongō-in Gardens 金剛院庭園; Kongō-in teien	Maizuru			35°28′34″N 135°26′51″E		
Kōsai-ji Gardens 江西寺庭園; Kōsaiji teien	Miyazu			35°32′52″N 135°09′06″E		
Myōen-ji Gardens 妙円寺庭園; Myōenji teien	Miyazu			35°36′07″N 135°13′08″E		
Mikami Family Gardens 三上家庭園; Mikami-ke teien	Miyazu			35°32′17″N 135°11′28″E		
Sōun-ji Gardens 宗雲寺庭園; Sōunji teien	Kyōtango			35°36′07″N 134°53′12″E		
Ueno Family Gardens 上野家庭園; Ueno-ke teien	Maizuru			35°26′44″N 135°12′57″E		
Jōsei-ji Gardens 常栖寺庭園; Jōseiji teien	Yosano			35°29′59″N 135°06′48″E		
Saikō-ji Gardens 西光寺庭園; Saikōji teien	Yosano			35°30′04″N 135°05′29″E		
Tateiwa 立岩; Tateiwa	Kyōtango	also a Prefectural Natural Monument		35°44′38″N 135°06′20″E		

== Municipal Places of Scenic Beauty ==
As of 1 May 2025, fifty-ones Places have been designated at a municipal level.

Site	Municipality	Comments	Image	Coordinates	Type	Ref.
Shōden-ji Gardens 正伝寺庭園; Shōdenji teien	Kyōto			35°03′44″N 135°44′13″E		
Shōkoku-ji Hōjō Rear Garden 相国寺裏方丈庭園; Shōkokuji ura hōjō teien	Kyōto			35°02′00″N 135°45′43″E		
Daishō-ji Gardens 大聖寺庭園; Daishōji teien	Kyōto			35°01′51″N 135°45′32″E		
Honmyō-in Gardens 本妙院庭園; Honmyō-in teien	Kyōto	subtemple of Myōren-ji (妙蓮寺)		35°02′05″N 135°44′58″E		
Ryūhon-ji Gardens 立本寺庭園; Ryūhonji teien	Kyōto			35°01′29″N 135°44′19″E		
Iwasa Family Gardens 岩佐家庭園; Iwasa-ke teien	Kyōto			35°03′19″N 135°45′22″E		
Nishimura Family Gardens 西村家庭園; Nishimura-ke teien	Kyōto			35°03′27″N 135°45′16″E		
Mibu-dera Gardens 壬生寺庭園; Mibudera teien	Kyōto			35°00′07″N 135°44′37″E		
Zakke-in Gardens 雑華院庭園; Zakke-in teien	Kyōto	subtemple of Myōshin-ji		35°01′25″N 135°43′16″E		
Rokuō-in Gardens 鹿王院庭園; Rokuō-in teien	Kyōto			35°01′00″N 135°41′04″E		
Gokuraku-ji Gardens 極楽寺庭園; Gokurakuji teien	Kyōto			34°59′09″N 135°42′25″E		
Kajū-ji Gardens 勧修寺庭園; Kajūji teien	Kyōto			34°57′40″N 135°48′27″E		
Yōgen-in Gardens 養源院庭園; Yōgen-in teien	Kyōto			34°59′16″N 135°46′25″E		
Sokushū-in Gardens 即宗院庭園; Sokushū-in teien	Kyōto			34°58′38″N 135°46′31″E		
Kankyū-an Gardens 官休庵（武者小路千家）庭園; Kankyūan (Mushakōjisenke) teien	Kyōto	Mushakōjisenke tea room		35°01′41″N 135°45′18″E		
Shimizu Family Jūgyū-an Gardens 清水家十牛庵庭園; Shimizu-ke Jūgyū-an teien	Kyōto			34°59′59″N 135°46′46″E		
Horinouchi Family Chōsei-an Gardens 堀内家長生庵庭園; Horinouchi-ke Chōsei-an teien	Kyōto			35°00′51″N 135°45′23″E		
Ikkō-an Gardens 遺香庵庭園; Ikkō-an teien	Kyōto	in the grounds of Kōzan-ji		35°03′36″N 135°40′43″E		
Kōun-ji Gardens 光雲寺庭園; Kōunji teien	Kyōto	subtemple of Nanzen-ji		35°01′01″N 135°47′43″E		
Sanzen-in - Yūsei-en and Juheki-en 三千院有清園庭園及び聚碧園庭園; Sanzen-in Yūsei-en teien oyobi Juheki-en teien	Kyōto			35°07′11″N 135°50′04″E		
Shirakawa-in Gardens 白河院庭園; Shirakawa-in teien	Kyōto	see Hosshō-ji		35°00′50″N 135°47′16″E		
Namikawa Family Gardens 並河家庭園; Namikawa-ke teien	Kyōto	at Namikawa Cloisonné Museum of Kyoto		35°00′36″N 135°46′53″E		
Kōsei-in Gardens 廣誠院庭園; Kōsei-in teien	Kyōto			35°00′43″N 135°46′13″E		
Ichō Family Gardens 鴨脚家庭園; Ichō-ke teien	Kyōto			35°02′02″N 135°46′19″E		
Saiō-in Roji 西翁院露地; Saiō-in roji	Kyōto	subtemple of Konkaikōmyō-ji		35°01′06″N 135°47′16″E		
Sumiya Gardens 角屋の庭; Sumiya no niwa	Kyōto			34°59′32″N 135°44′35″E		
Nakai Family Gardens 中井家の庭; Nakai-ke no niwa	Kyōto					
I-en 怡園; I-en	Kyōto			35°00′50″N 135°47′28″E		
Tōji-in Gardens 等持院の庭; Tōji-in no niwa	Kyōto			35°01′54″N 135°43′24″E		
Fushimi Inari Taisha Matsunoshitaya 伏見稲荷大社松の下屋; Fushimi Inari Taisha Matsunoshitaya	Kyōto			34°57′59″N 135°46′23″E		
Jōjū-ji Gardens 淨住寺の庭; Jōjūji no niwa	Kyōto			34°59′20″N 135°41′10″E		
Reikan-ji Gardens 霊鑑寺の庭; Reikanji no niwa	Kyōto			35°01′15″N 135°47′47″E		
Hōshun-in Gardens 芳春院の庭; Hōshun-in no niwa	Kyōto	subtemple of Daitoku-ji		35°02′42″N 135°44′42″E		
Goshiki Beach Surroundings 五色浜周辺; Goshiki-hama shūhen	Kyōtango	also a Municipal Natural Monument		35°40′33″N 134°58′10″E		
Kirifuri Falls 霧降の滝; Kirifuri no taki	Kyōtango			35°38′47″N 135°00′11″E		
Mumyō Falls 無明の滝; Mumyō no taki	Kyōtango			35°31′55″N 134°57′40″E		
Matsunoo-dera Gardens 松尾寺庭園; Matsunoo-dera teien	Maizuru			35°29′51″N 135°28′09″E		
Kerria japonica on the Ide Tamagawa Embankment 井手の玉川堤の山吹; Ide no Tamagawa-tsutsumi no yamabuki	Ide	also a Municipal Historic Site and Natural Monument		34°47′56″N 135°48′31″E		
Ujitawara Great Falls 大滝; Ō-taki	Ujitawara			34°50′26″N 135°54′24″E		

== Registered Places of Scenic Beauty - National ==
As of 2 July 2026, zero Monuments have been registered (as opposed to designated) as Places of Scenic Beauty at a national level.

== Registered Places of Scenic Beauty - Prefectural ==
As of 1 April 2025, one Monument has been registered (as opposed to designated) as a Place of Scenic Beauty at a prefectural level.

Place	Municipality	Comments	Image	Coordinates	Type	Ref.
Rakurakusō Gardens 楽々荘庭園; Rakurakusō teien	Kameoka			35°00′57″N 135°34′36″E		

== Registered Places of Scenic Beauty - Prefectural (Provisional) ==
As of 1 April 2025, a further eight Monuments have been provisionally registered (as opposed to designated) as Places of Scenic Beauty at a prefectural level.

Place	Municipality	Comments	Image	Coordinates	Type	Ref.
Jōfuku-ji Gardens 浄福寺庭園; Jōfukuji teien	Kameoka			35°02′41″N 135°32′16″E		for all refs see
Enpuku-ji Gardens 延福寺庭園; Enpukuji teien	Kameoka			35°00′32″N 135°28′46″E		
Koto Falls 琴滝; Koto-taki	Kyōtamba			35°08′22″N 135°26′16″E		
Gyokuun-ji Hōjō Gardens 玉雲寺方丈庭園; Gyokuunji hōjō teien	Kyōtamba			35°08′26″N 135°26′02″E		
Shinshu-en 心種園; Shinshu-en	Maizuru			35°26′46″N 135°19′54″E		
Tōzan-ji Gardens 東山寺庭園; Tōzanji teien	Maizuru			35°26′36″N 135°20′34″E		
Gansen-ji Precinct 岩船寺境内; Gansenji keidai	Kizugawa	also provisionally registered as a Prefectural Historic Site		34°43′13″N 135°53′09″E		
Hiyoshi Jinja Precinct 日吉神社境内; Hiyoshi Jinja keidai	Miyazu	also provisionally registered as a Prefectural Historic Site		35°32′25″N 135°11′17″E		

== Registered Places of Scenic Beauty - Municipal ==
Monuments registered (as opposed to designated) as Places of Scenic Beauty at a municipal level include:

Place	Municipality	Comments	Image	Coordinates	Type	Ref.
Jizō-in Gardens 地蔵院庭園; Jizō-in teien	Kyōto			34°59′25″N 135°41′10″E		
Ōhashi Family Gardens 大橋家庭園; Ōhashi-ke teien	Kyōto			34°58′07″N 135°46′24″E		
Miyako Hotel Gardens 都ホテル葵殿庭園及び佳水園庭園; Miyako Hoteru Aoiden teien oyobi Kasui-en teien	Kyōto			35°00′31″N 135°47′16″E		

== See also ==
- Cultural Properties of Japan
- List of Historic Sites of Japan (Kyoto)
- List of parks and gardens of Kyoto Prefecture
- List of Cultural Properties of Japan – paintings (Kyoto)
- List of Cultural Properties of Japan – historical materials (Kyoto)
