= Shisen-dō =

Buddhist temple in Kyoto, Japan

- 詩仙堂
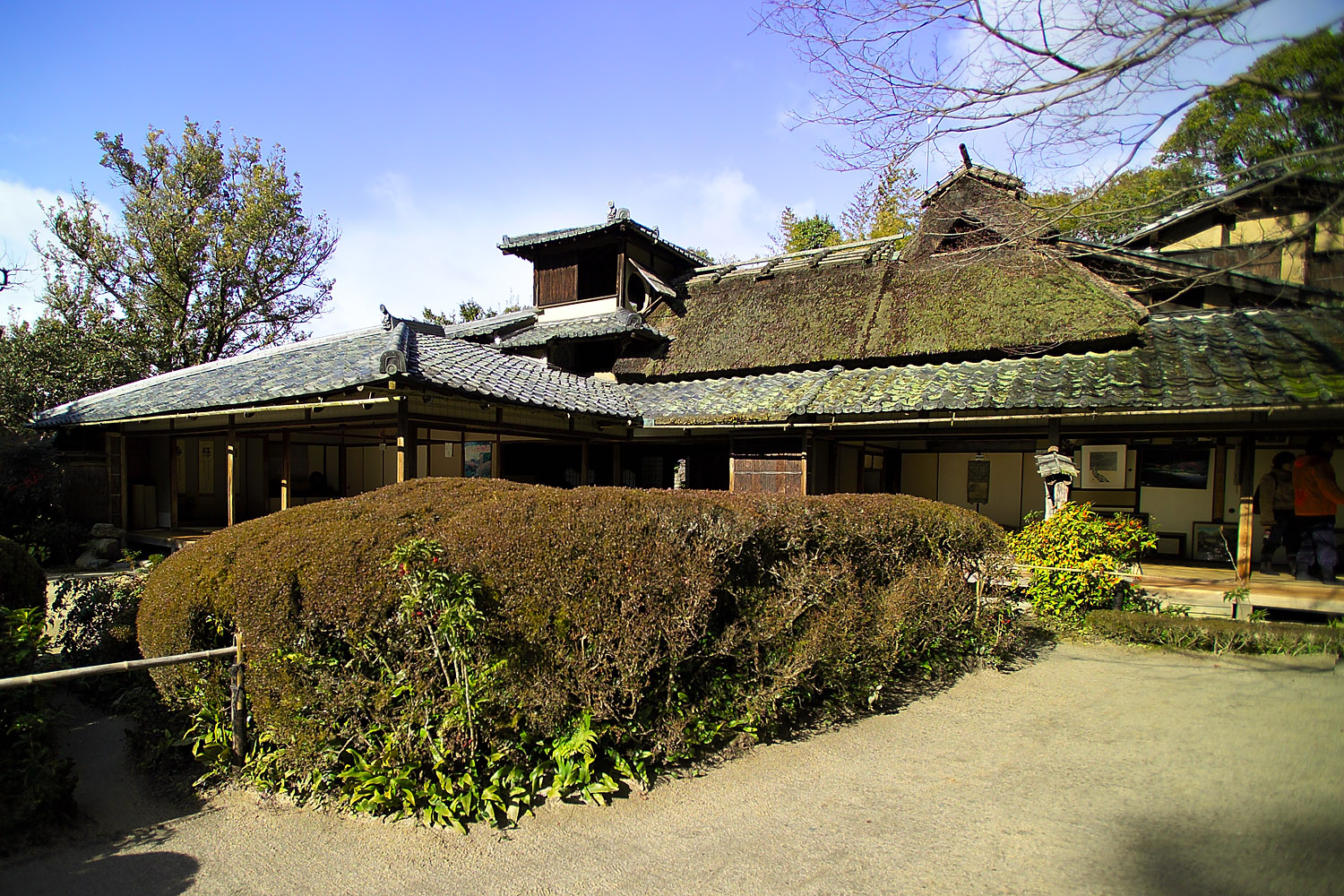
- Hisen-dō

- Hisen-dō Shisen-dō (Japan)

Religion
- Affiliation: Buddhist
- Deity: Kannon Bosatsu
- Rite: Sōtō

Location
- Location: 27 Ichijōji Monguchichō, Sakyō-ku, Kyoto-shi, Kyoto-fu
- Country: Japan
- Interactive map of Shisen-dō
- Coordinates: 35°02′37″N 135°47′46″E

Architecture
- Founder: Ishikawa Jōzan
- Completed: 1641

Website
- Official website
- National Historic Site of Japan

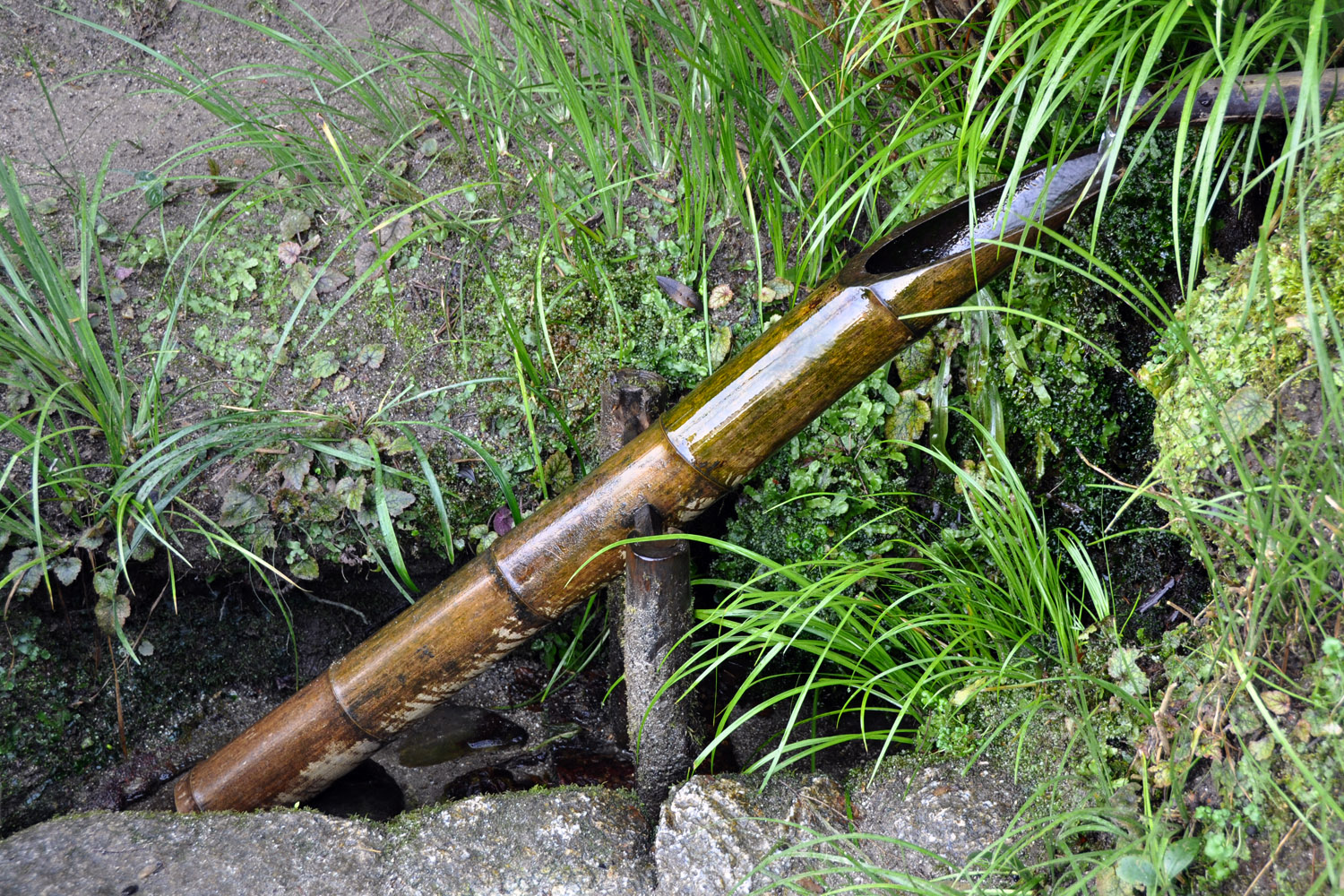
Sōzu in the garden

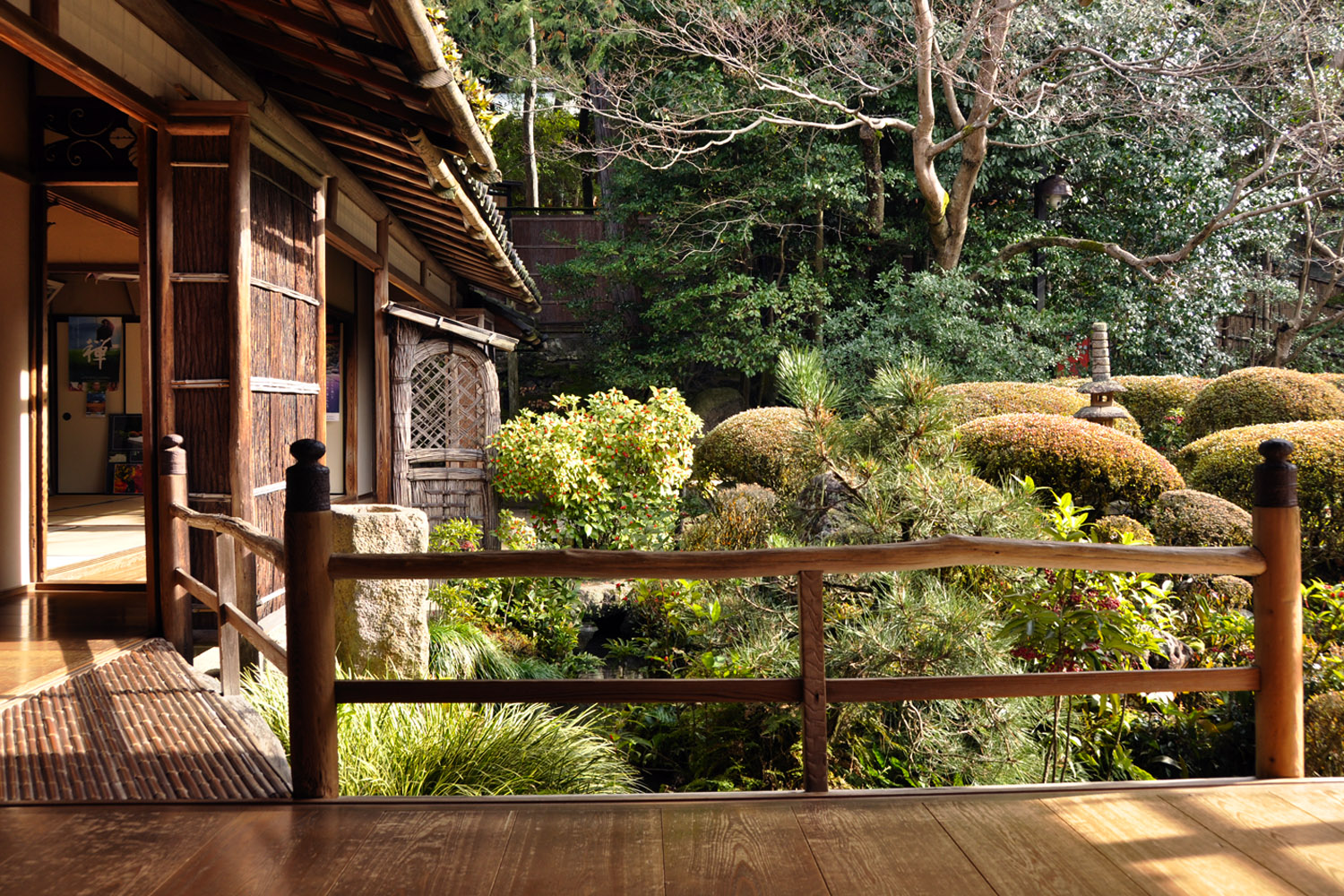
Garden and building

Shisen-dō (詩仙堂) is a Buddhist temple located in Sakyō-ku, Kyoto, Japan. It belongs to the Sōtō school of Japanese Zen and its honzon is an image of Merōfu Kannon. The temple's full name is Rorozan Shisen-dō Jōzan-ji (六六山 詩仙堂 丈山寺), with the temple name coming from the fact that it was originally the villa of the Edo period intellectual Ishikawa Jōzan (1583–1672), who established the temple in 1641. The temple was designated a National Historic Site in 1928.

== Overview ==
Shinsen-dō was originally the villa of the scholar Ishikawa Jōzan, a vassal of Tokugawa Ieyasu, but after an incident related to the Siege of Osaka in the summer of 1500, was placed under house arrest for a time. He then entered the Myōshin-ji monastery and was taught Neo-Confucianism by Fujiwara Seika and had close ties to Hayashi Razan. For a time, he worked for the Asano clan of Hiroshima Domain, but after the death of his mother, he gave up his position and retired to Kyoto, where he lived a secluded life. Initially, he lived in a hermitage near Shōkoku-ji, which he called the "Hermitage of Sleeping Bamboo" (睡竹堂, Suichiku-dō), but four years later, in 1641, he moved to the current location. Because the house was situated on a slope, Jōzan initially wanted to call it the "Concave-Covex Shelter" (凹凸窠, Ōtsuka), but because the interior contained pictures of 36 famous Chinese poets, he ultimately decided on the current name Shinsen-dō, or "Hall of Poets". Since the donor of these paintings, Kinoshita Katsutoshi (1569–1649), had the idea of the Kasendō (歌仙堂), Jōzan had Kanō Tan'yū paint portraits of the poets and decorated the second floor with them, with each wall having portraits of nine poets. Jōzan also occupied himself with the Japanese tea ceremony and excelled in Japanese garden design. He was friends with Shōkadō Shōjō, one of the "Three Calligraphers of the Kan'ei Era", and with the wealthy entrepreneur Suminokura Sōan (角倉 素庵; 1571–1632), eldest son of Suminokura Ryōi (1554–1614), and thus lived a life with connections to science and art.

When Jōzan died in 1672 at the age of 90, he was buried about 500 meters northeast of the villa. His grave and is also registered as a National Historic site.

The temple's gardens, designed by Jōzan, are considered masterworks of Japanese gardens and were designed to be enjoyed in all four seasons. One of them includes a device called a sōzu, a type of shishi-odoshi designed to scare away wild animals such as deer by making a loud noise. Water trickles into a bamboo tube, and when it reaches a certain level, it upsets the balance of the tube. The tube tips over on a pivot, discharging the water, and turns upright, striking a rock and emitting a loud clapping noise. This link plays a recording of the sōzu at Shisen-dō.
