= Nanzen-in =

Buddhist temple in Kyoto, Japan

Nanzen-in 南禅院
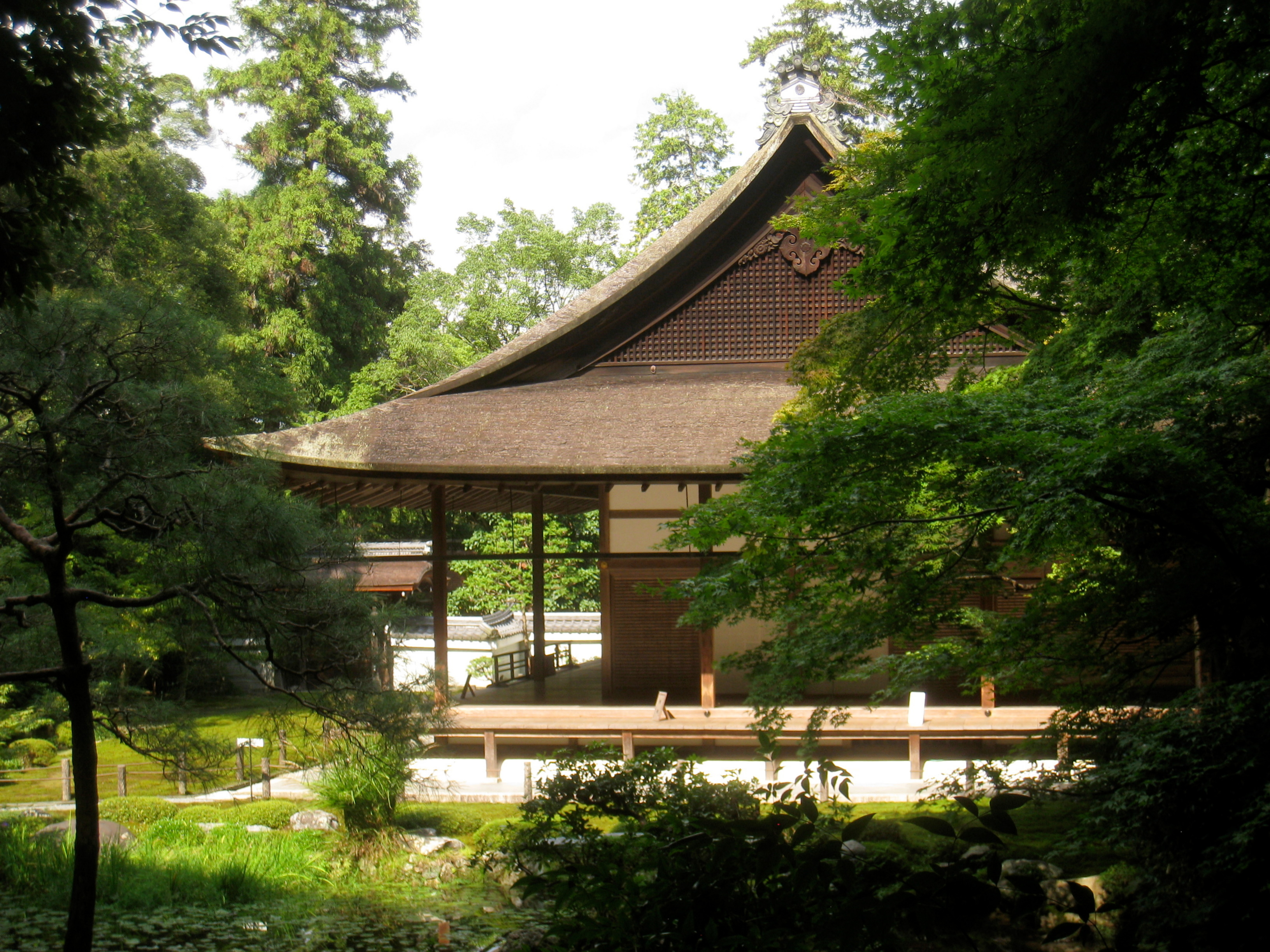
- Nanzen-in

- Nanzen-in Nanzen-in (Japan)

Religion
- Affiliation: Buddhist
- Deity: Emperor Kameyama
- Rite: Rinzai school Nanzen-ji branch

Location
- Location: 86 Nanzenji Fukuchicho, Sakyo Ward, Kyoto-shi, Kyoto-fu
- Country: Japan
- Interactive map of Nanzen-in 南禅院
- Coordinates: 35°0′37.08″N 135°47′37.93″E

Architecture
- Founder: Emperor Kameyama
- Completed: 1287
- National Place of Scenic Beauty National Historic Site of Japan

Nanzen-in (南禅院) is one of the tatchu sub-temples of Nanzen-ji, a Rinzai school Zen Buddhist temple in the Fukuchi neighborhood of Sakyō-ku in the city of Kyoto Japan. Its honzon is a Kamakura period statue of Emperor Kameyama, which is a National Important Cultural Property.

== Overview ==
In 1264, Emperor Kameyama built a detached palace, Zenrinji-den, on this site. The detached palace was divided into the "Kami no Gosho" (Upper Palace) and the "Shimo no Gosho" (Lower Palace), and in 1287, Emperor Kameyama built a personal chapel, Nanzen-in in the "Kami no Gosho" portion of the palace. He retired two years later in 1289 and in 1291 converted the Zenrinji-den villa into a temple, which he named Ryoanzan Zenrin-ji. His grave is located in the southeast corner of the temple's gardens. Later, Zenrin-ji expanded in size and changed its name to Nanzen-ji, and Nanzen-in became its sub-temple. It burned down in 1393, and in 1420, the sleeping quarters of the Kitayama Imperial Palace were moved here, but it was burned down again in the Great Nanzen-ji Fire of 1447. It fell into ruin after the Ōnin War, but was rebuilt in 1703 by Keisho-in (the mother of Tokugawa Tsunayoshi). The Hōjō (abbots quarters) dates from this time, and has fusuma sliding doors with paintings by Kanō Tsunenobu and his sons.

The gardens of Nanzen-in are a strolling-style Japanese garden with pond designed by Emperor Kameyama in the Kamakura period, and are thus one of the oldest surviving gardens in Kyoto. It was completed by Muso Soseki in the Muromachi period. The gardens are a National Historic Site and also a National Place of Scenic Beauty

The temple also has a Kamakura period wooden seated portrait statue of Issan Ichinei, a monk who came to Japan as an envoy of the Yuan Dynasty. After serving as head abbot of Kencho-ji and Engaku-ji in Kamakura, he before becoming the third abbot of Nanzen-ji Temple.

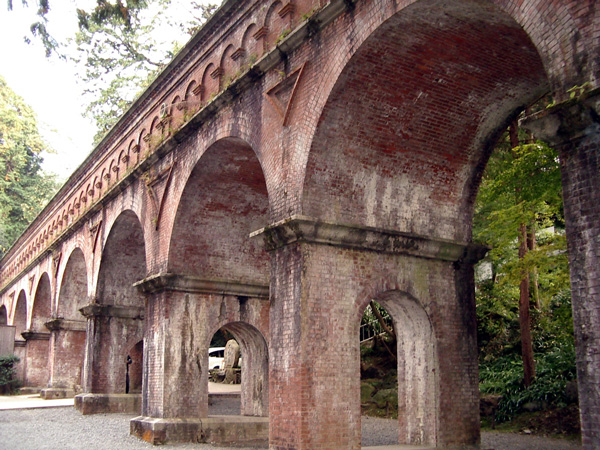
Lake Biwa Aquaduct

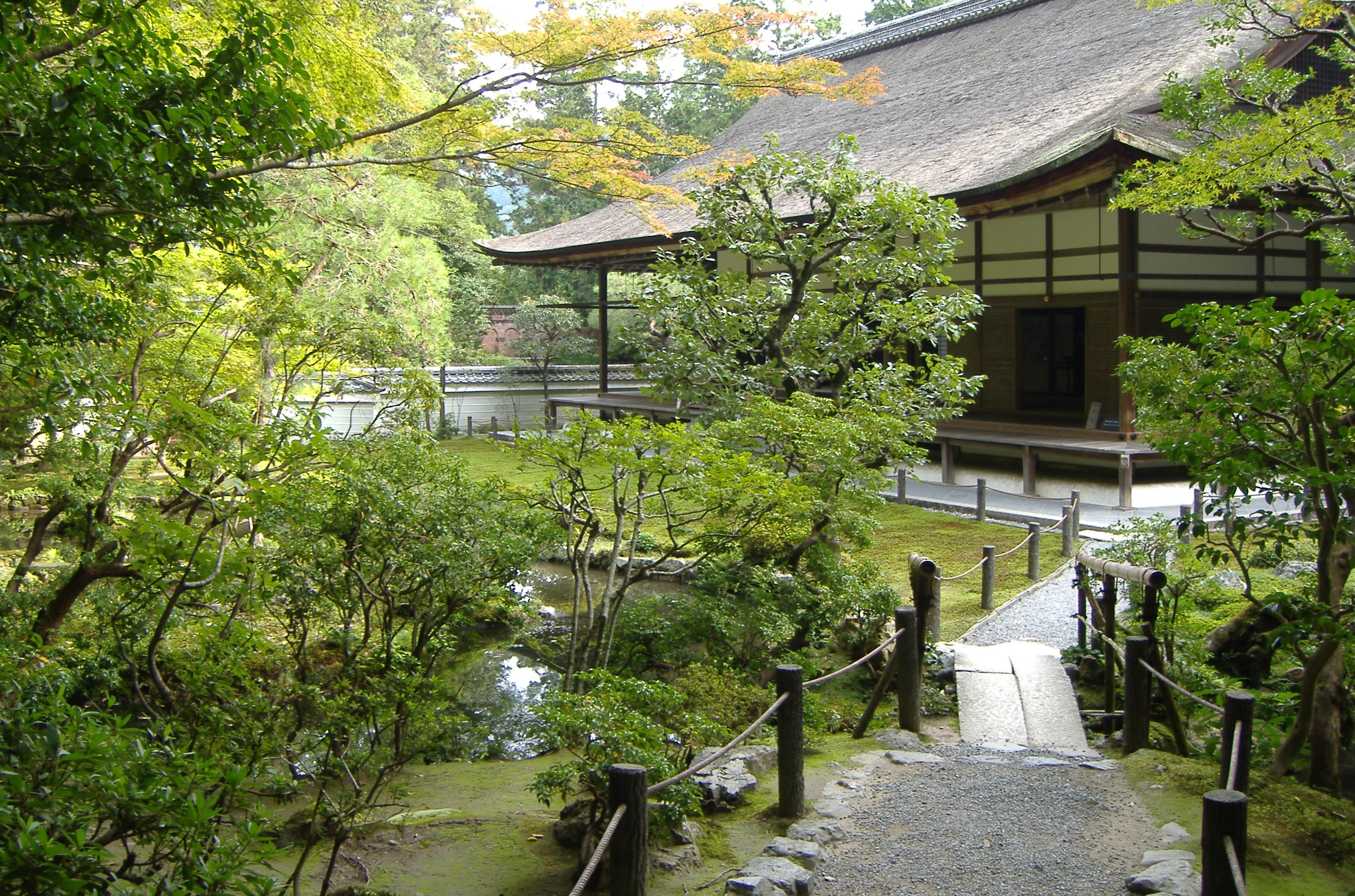
Hōjō Abbot's Quarters (NT)

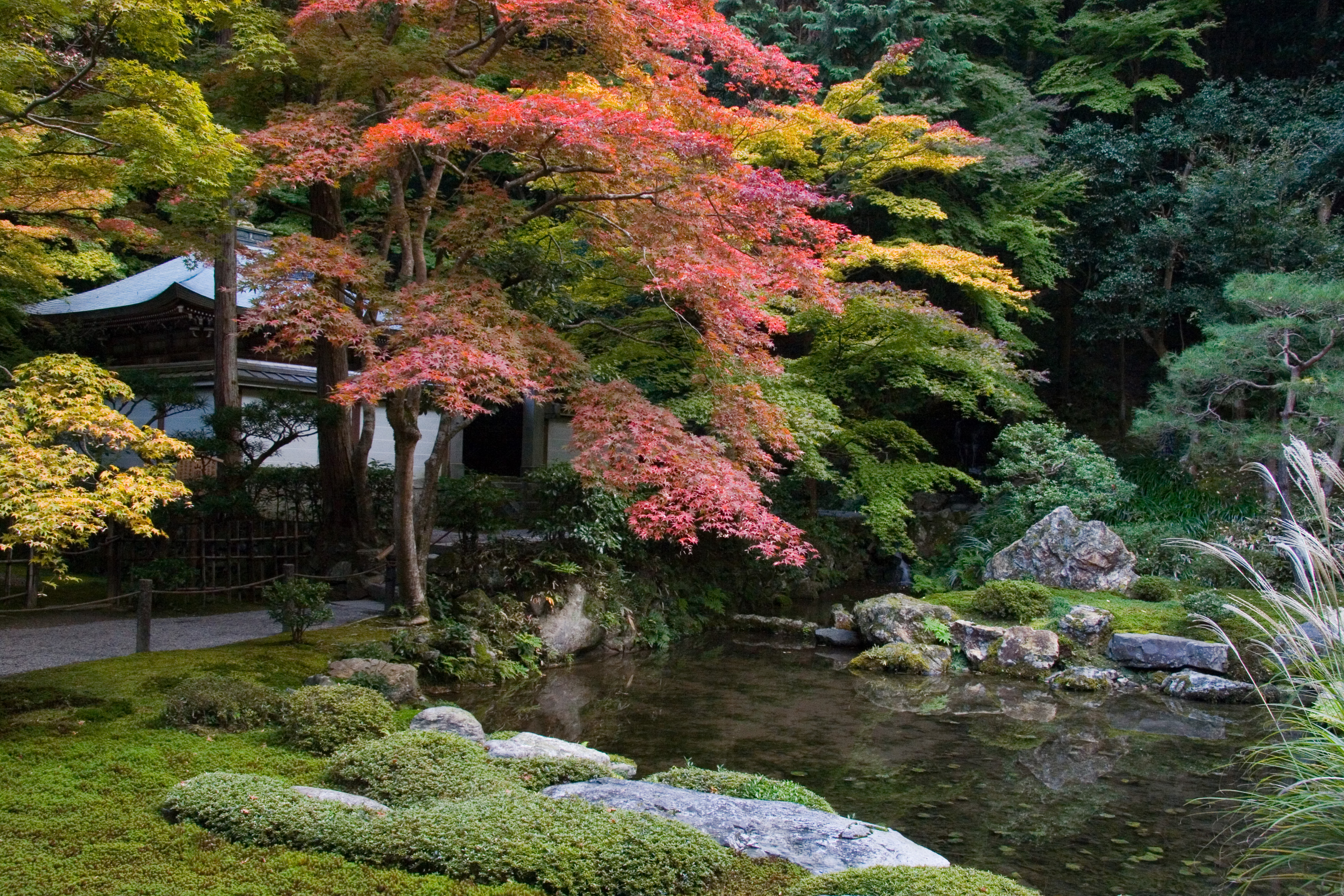
Nanzen-in gardens

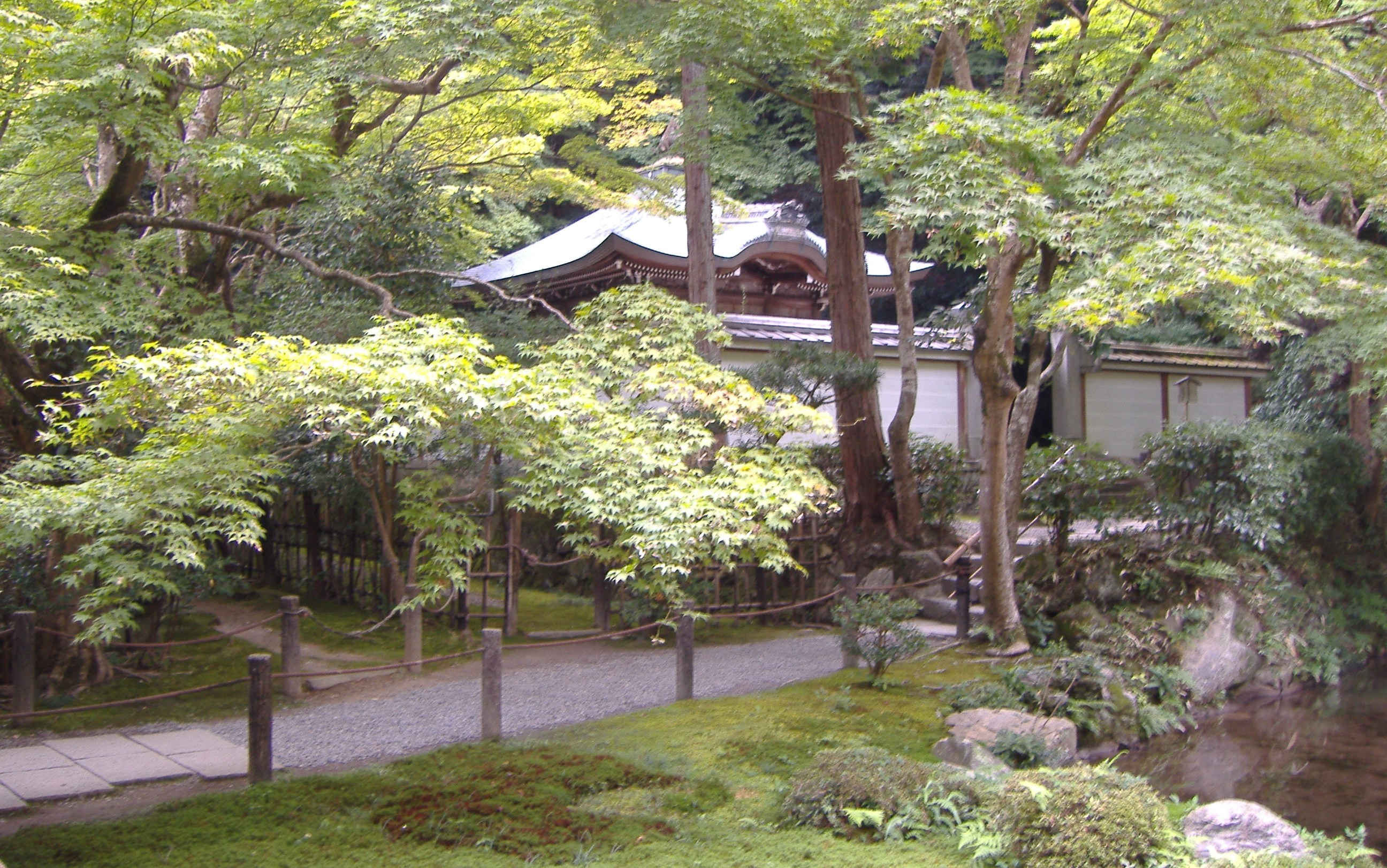
Emperor Kameyama's grave

Nanzen-in is located a 15-minute walk from Keage Station on the Kyoto Municipal SubwayTozai Line

== See also ==
- List of Historic Sites of Japan (Kyoto)
- List of Places of Scenic Beauty of Japan (Kyoto)
