= Philosopher's Walk =

Path in Kyoto, Japan

Coordinates: 35°1′30.46″N 135°47′46.2″E

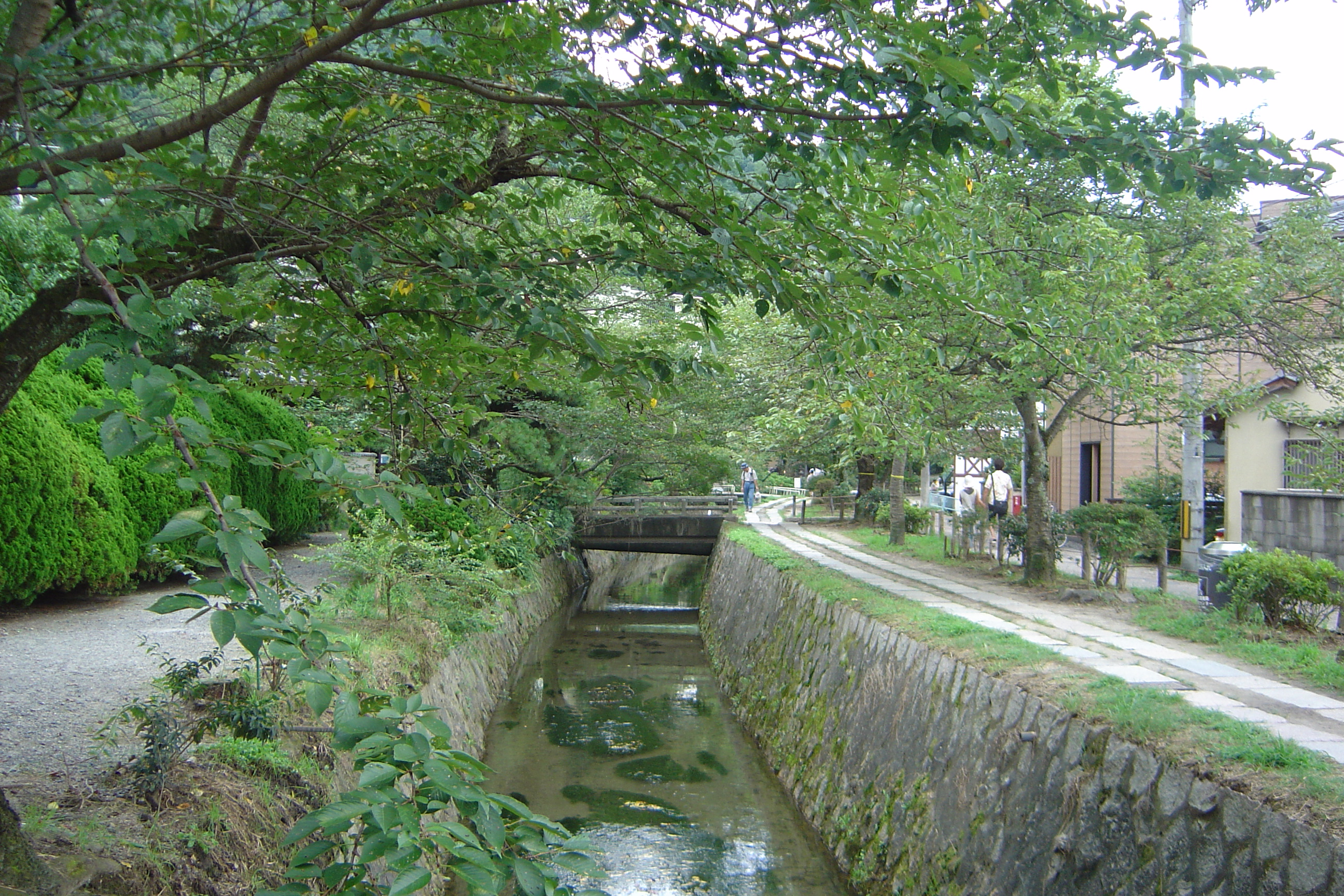
In summer

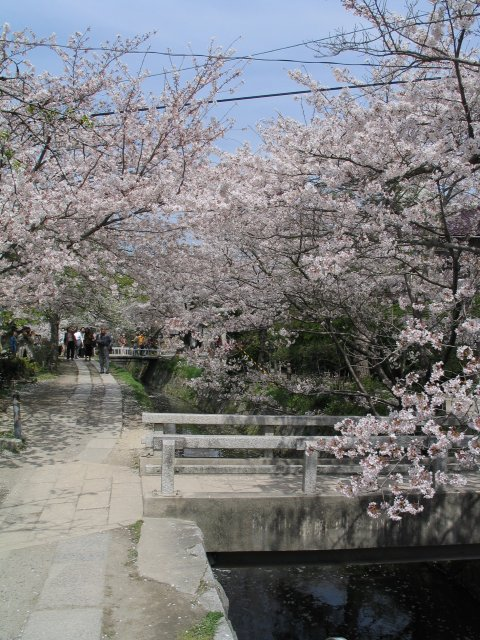
In spring, Cherry trees in blossom

Map

The Philosopher's Walk (哲学の道, Tetsugaku-no-michi; lit. Path of Philosophy) is a pedestrian path that follows a cherry-tree-lined canal in Kyoto, Japan between Ginkaku-ji and Nanzen-ji. First opened in 1890 and extended again in 1912, the path follows the course of a shallow irrigation channel bringing water from the Lake Biwa Canal.

== Etymology ==
The route is so-named because two 20th-century Japanese philosophers and Kyoto University professors, Nishida Kitaro and Hajime Tanabe, are thought to have used it for daily exercise.

== Layout ==
The path passes a number of temples and shrines such as Hōnen-in, Ōtoyo Shrine, and Eikan-dō Zenrin-ji. It takes about 30 minutes to complete the walk, although many people spend more time visiting the sights along the way. On the northern part of the walk, there are good views of the nearby Daimonji. The walk is a popular destination for tourists and locals, especially during hanami.
