= Shōka-dō =

- 松花堂 (Japanese)
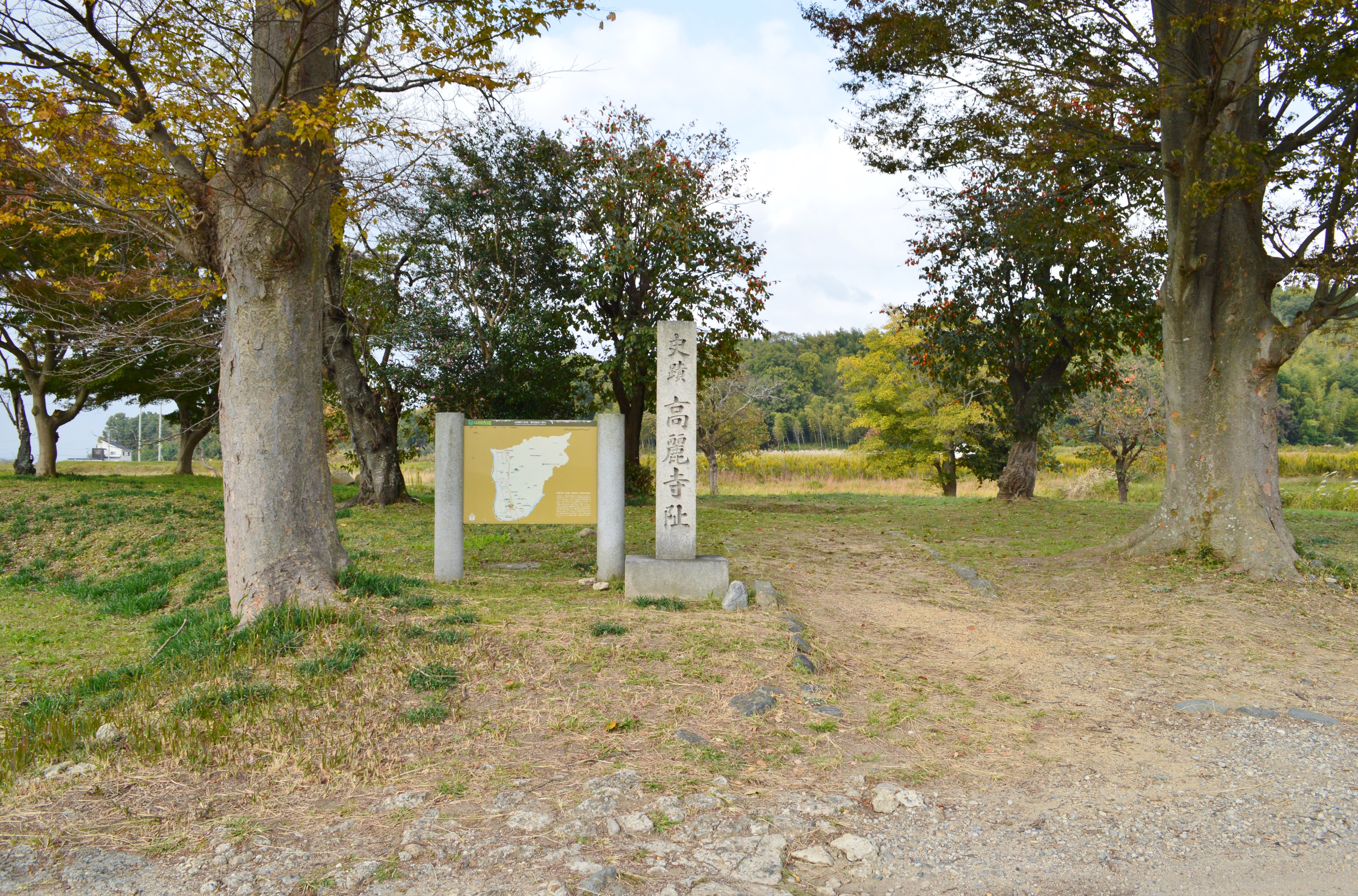
- Shōka-dō

- Shōka-dō Shōka-dō (Japan)
- Interactive map of Shōka-dō
- 34°52′46.5″N 135°42′6.4″E
- Periods: Edo period
- Location: Yawata, Kyoto, Japan
- Region: Kinai region

Site notes
- Public access: Yes (museum)

The Shōka-dō (松花堂) is a hermitage built in the early Edo period, located in the city of Yawata, Kyoto, Japan. It was designated as a National Historic Site in 1957 under the name "Shōka-dō and its ruins" and its gardens were designated a National Place of Scenic Beauty under the name "Shōka-dō and Shoin Garden" the same year.

== Overview ==
The Shōka-dō is a hermitage built in 1637 by Shōkadō Shōjō, a shrine priest of Iwashimizu Hachiman-gu and noted painter and literary figure in the early Edo period. He had entered the priesthood at the age of 17, became a master of Shingon Esoteric Buddhism, and attained the high rank of Ajari Hōin. At the eastern foot of Mount Otokoyama, where Iwashimizu Hachiman-gu is located, were numerous lodging houses which had been converted from chapels, and these were known as the "Otokoyama 48 temples". Shōkadō Shōjō inherited the lodging called "Takimoto-bō" and was visited there by many literary and artistic figures, including Kobori Enshū, Ishikawa Jōzan, Kinoshita Chōshōshi, Kogetsu Sōgan and Takuan Sōhō. In his later years, Shōkadō Shōjō constructed his hermitage within the nearby lodging house called "Izumo-bō". With the Shinbutsu bunri orders of the Meiji government in the mid-19th century, all of the lodging houses at Iwashimizu Hachiman-gu were abolished in 1868. The Shōka-dō building itself was relocated three times and is now south of its former location. It is a square structure with a dirt floor and thatch roof, and in appearance is a combination of a Buddhist temple and a teahouse.

It is currently a cultural facility called the Shokado Garden and Art Museum, managed and operated by the Yawata Citizens' Cultural Foundation. The gardens consist of the Outer Garden, containing 400 types of bamboo, three Japanese tea ceremony rooms, and the Annex of the Shokado Museum of Art, and the Inner Garden, containing the Shōka-dō structure itself (a Kyoto Prefecture Designated Cultural Property), the Shoin, which was a structure built by Kobayakawa Hideaki (Kyoto Prefecture Tangible Cultural Property), the Shokado Museum of Art, the Higashi Kurumazuka Kofun (an ancient burial mound) and the Kyoto Kitcho, a ryōtei famous for having invented the "Shōkadō bentō".

The gardens and museum are approximately an eight-minute walk from Yawatashi Station on the Keihan Electric Railway.

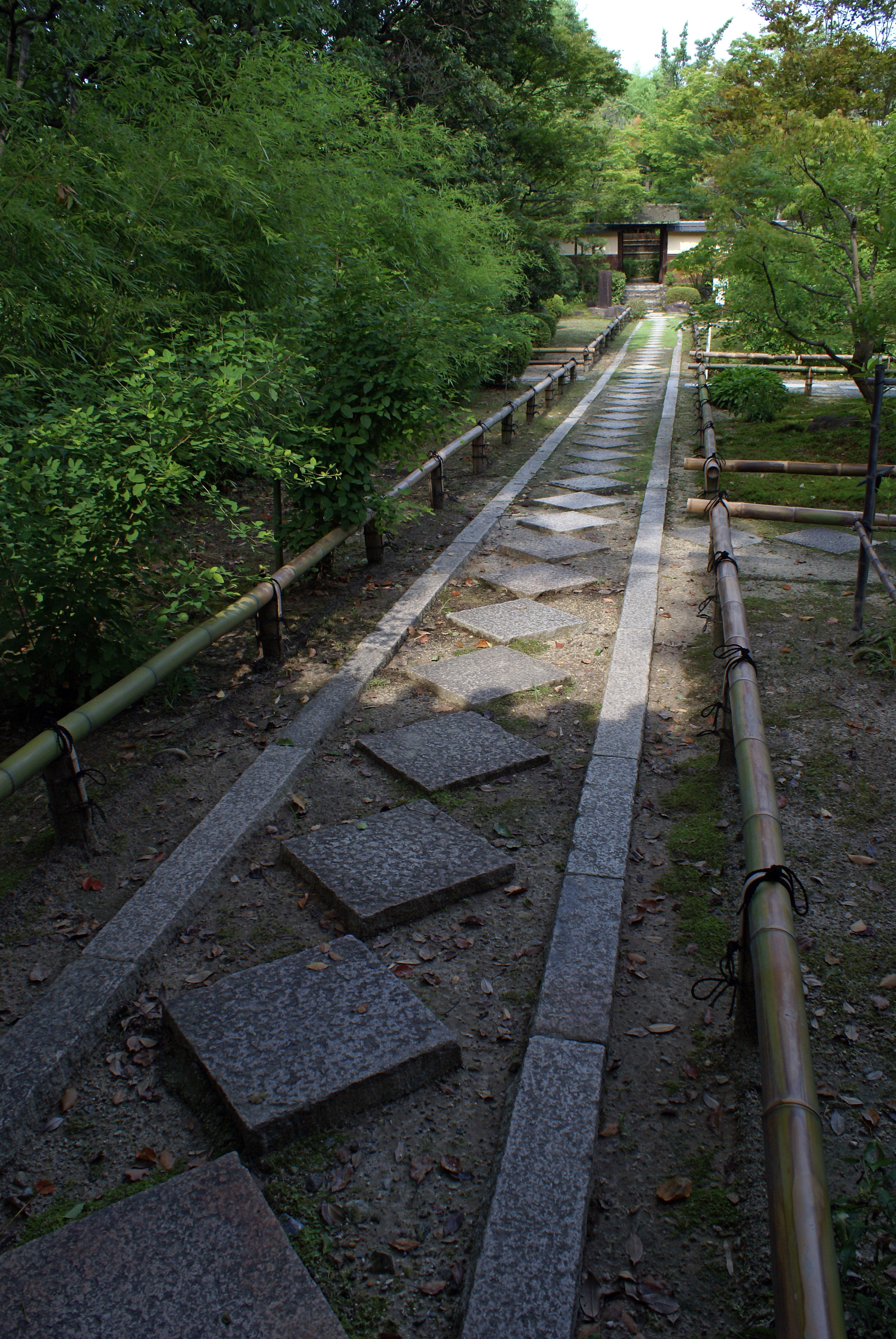
Inner Garden（Shōka-dō）

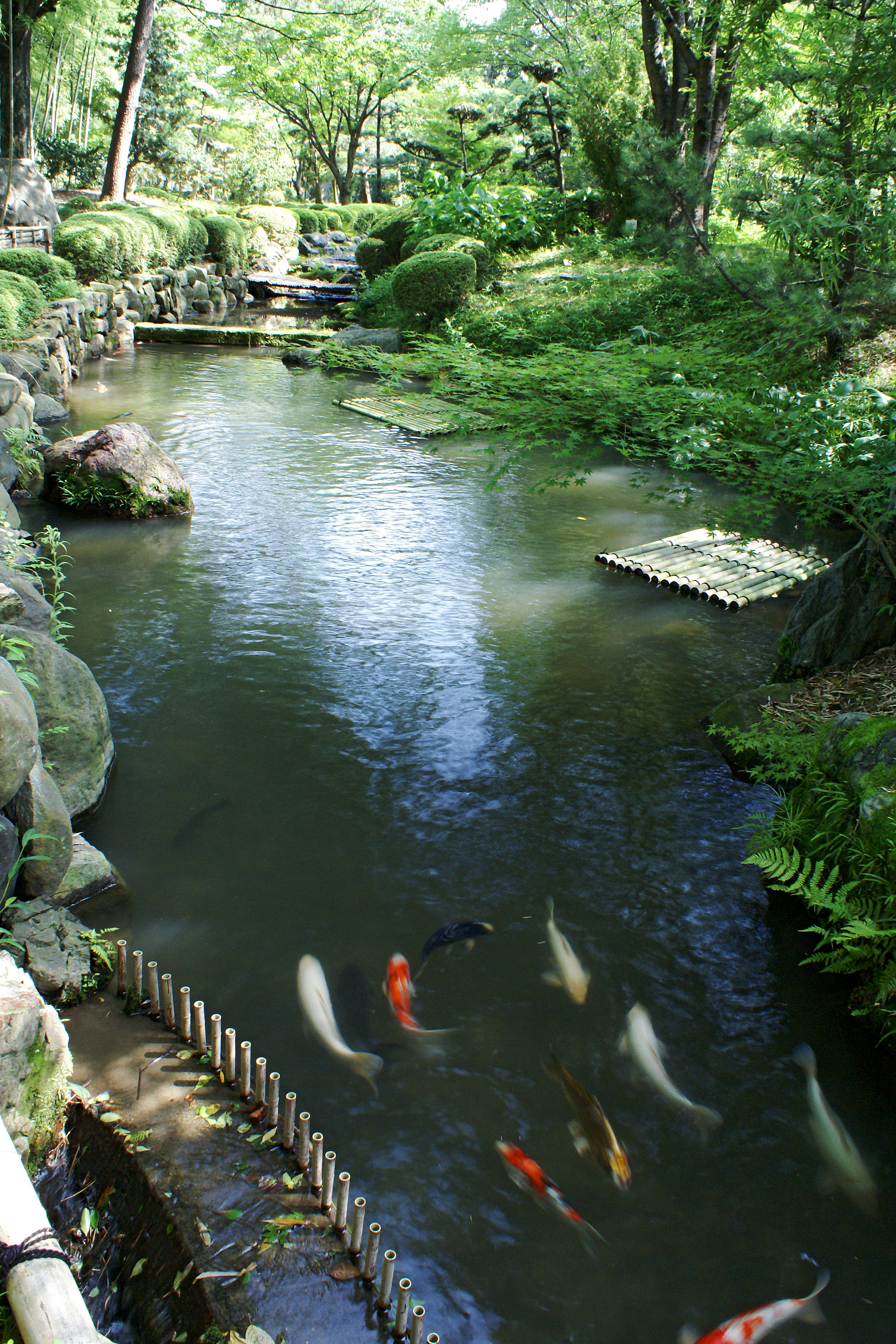
Outer Garden

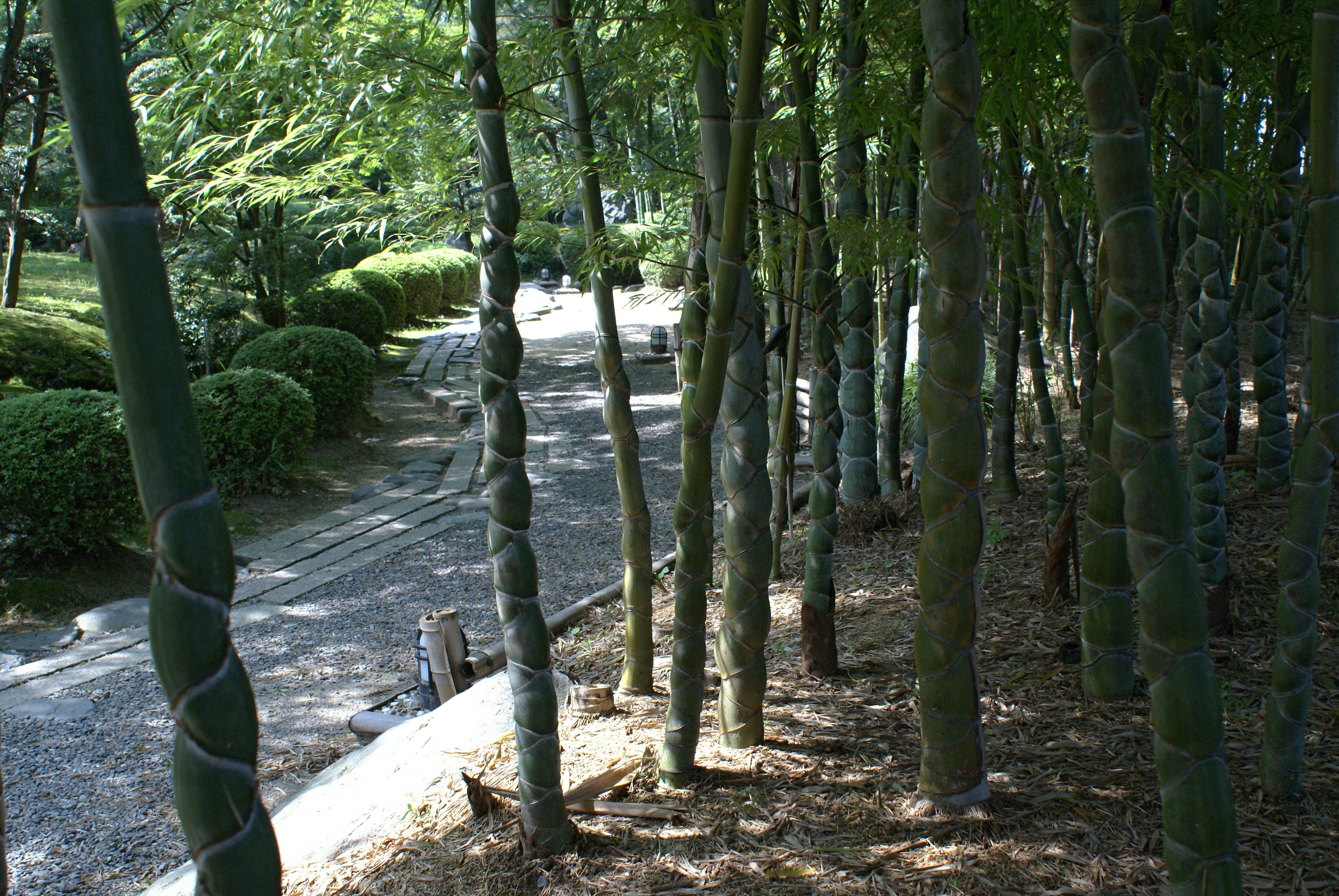
Bamboo in Outer Garden

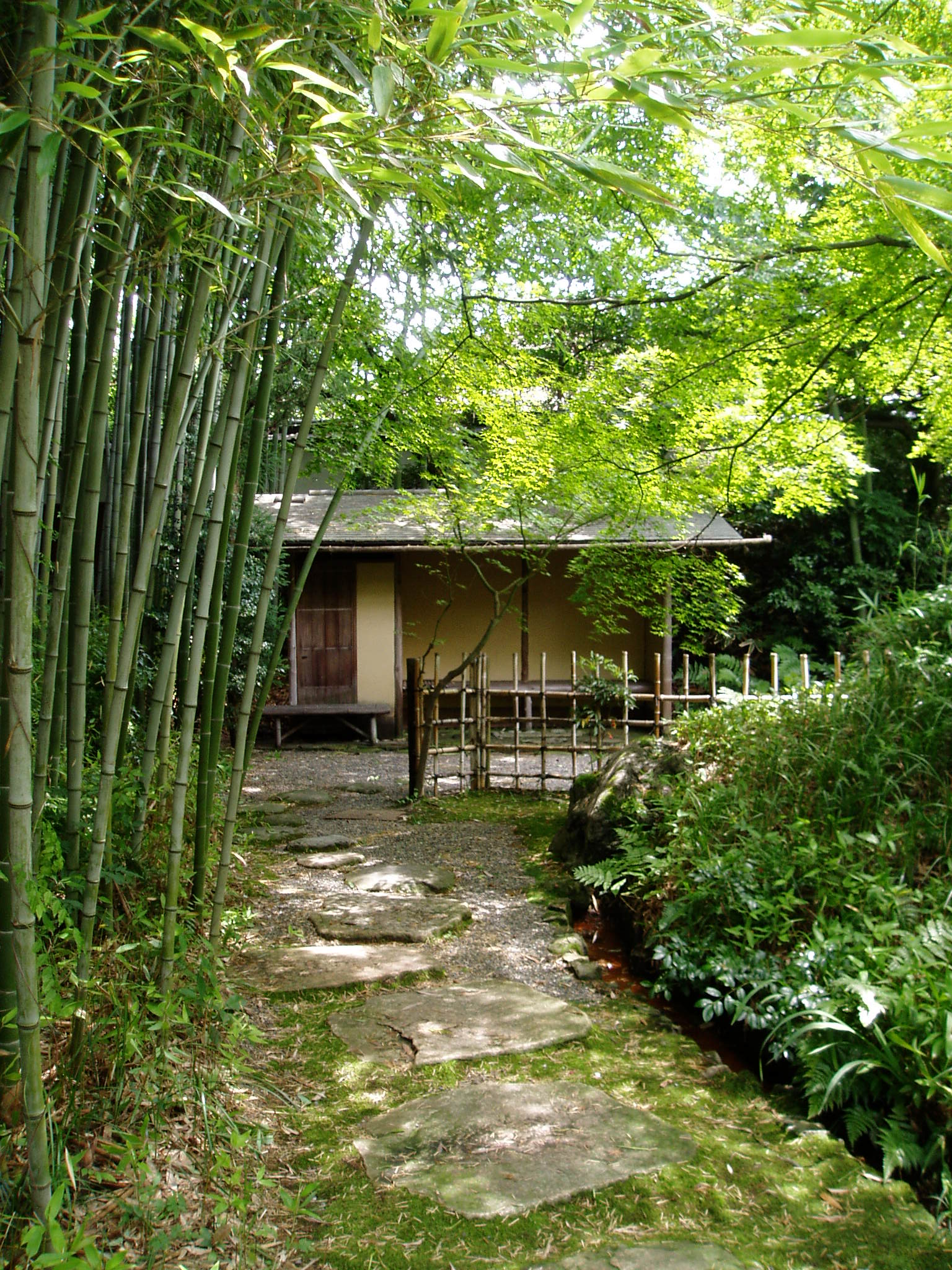
Japanese tea ceremony teahouse

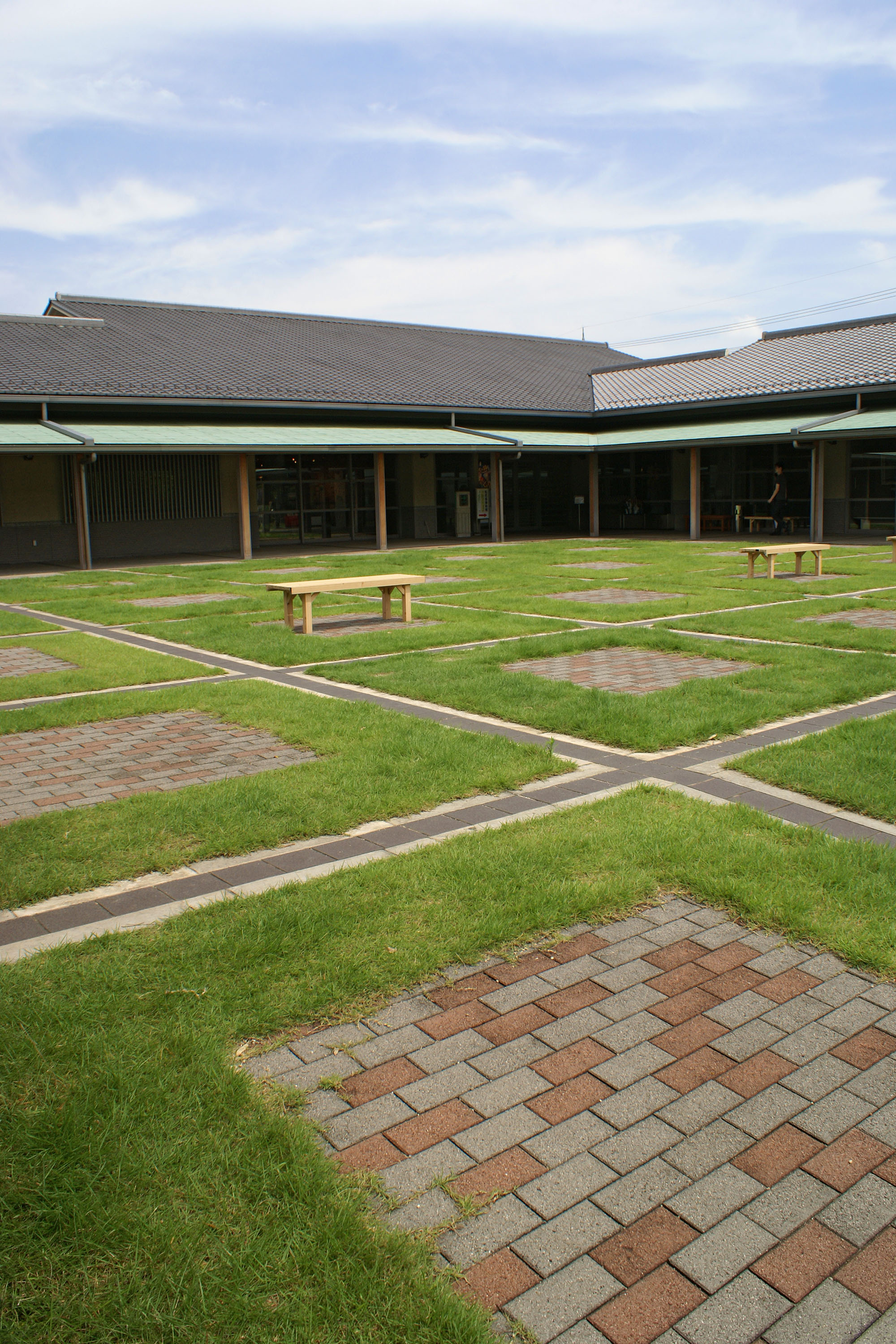
Shōkadō Art Museum

== See also ==
- List of Historic Sites of Japan (Kyoto)
- List of Places of Scenic Beauty of Japan (Kyoto)
