= Inshō Dōmoto =

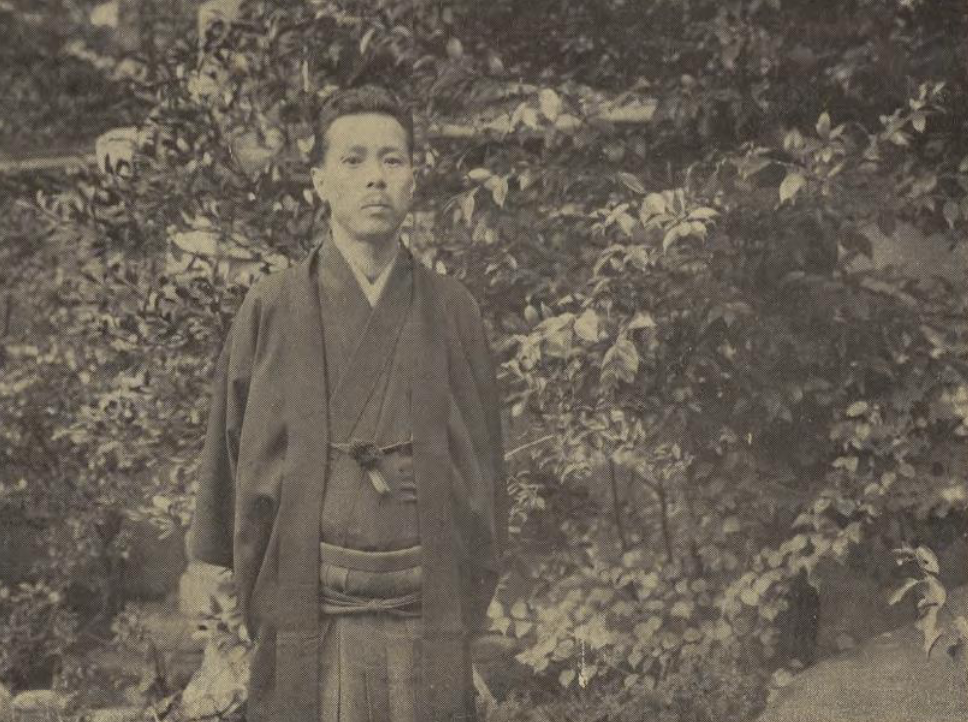
Inshō Dōmoto

Inshō Dōmoto (堂本 印象, Dōmoto Inshō; December 25, 1891 – September 5, 1975) was a Japanese Nihonga artist.

== Biography ==
His birth name was Sannosuke Dōmoto. At a young age, he started working for Heizo Tatsumura I. At the age of 28, he was exhibited with his work "Landscape of Fukakusa". His 1961 "Symphony" is considered one of his most famous paintings.

Dōmoto painted 600 interior screens and ceilings for Buddhist temples and shrines, amongst them Tōfuku-ji in Kyoto's Higashiyama district. In 1933, he painted the large and vivid "Blue Dragon" ceiling painting for one of the halls. He painted it in 17 days.

He received a commission from the monastery Chishaku-in, that has a garden said to be a favourite of Sen no Rikyū, to paint new sliding doors facing it. "Ladies at Tea" from 1958 shows a more western-style painting of two women enjoying tea. The left side is a woman in kimono, while the lady to the right is in western dress. The four sliding doors were a departure from the traditional style.

Dōmoto received a commission from the temple Hōnen-in for two rooms. Normally the rooms had paintings by the Kano school. Two rooms that he painted in 1971 "Soft breeze approaching" depict the Pure Land. An abstract painting, it shows willows or trees swaying in the wind.

== School ==
When he was 45 years old, he established a painting school which still exists today. One of the teachers there is Nihonga painter Masaki Ukai.

The Inshō Dōmoto Art Museum in Kyoto is dedicated to his work and regularly holds exhibitions about him and other painters.

== Awards ==
He was made an Imperial Household Artist in 1944 and received the Order of Culture in 1961.
