= Rurikō-in =

Buddhist temple in Kyoto, Japan

Rurikō-in (瑠璃光院)
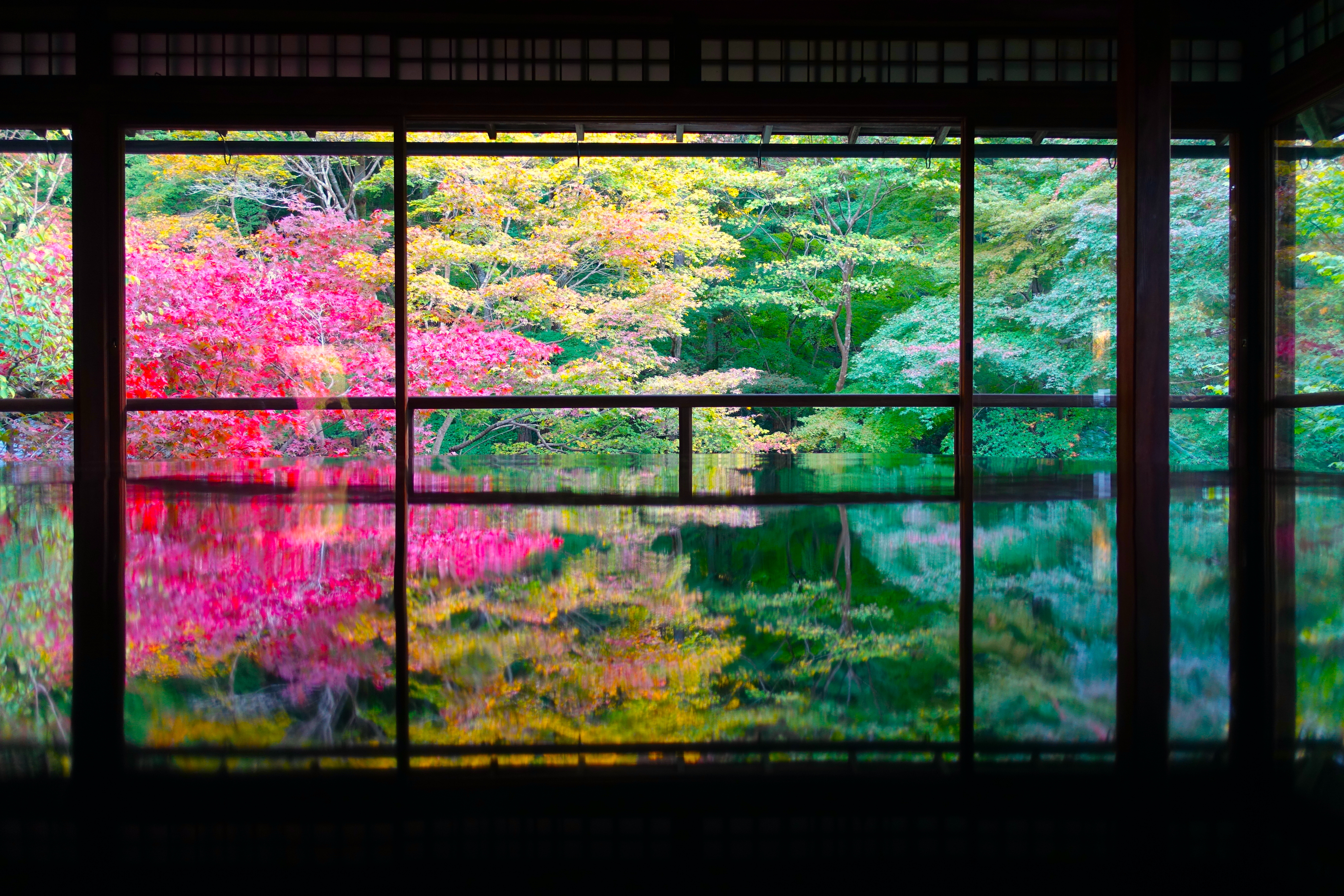
- View of fall colors from the second floor of Rurikō-in

Religion
- Affiliation: Buddhism
- Deity: Amitābha

Location
- Location: Kamitakano, Sakyō-ku, Kyoto
- Country: Japan
- Interactive map of Rurikō-in (瑠璃光院)
- Coordinates: 35°03′48″N 135°48′31″E

Rurikō-in (瑠璃光院) is a Buddhist temple located in Kyoto, Japan. The temple is known for its garden, whose maple trees offer a colourful view in autumn.

== History ==
The land Rurikō-in sits on originally belonged to the Taisho-era businessman Tanaka Gentarō (1853–1922), founder of Kyoto Electric Light, Co. After Tanaka's death, the property was managed by the company until it was acquired by Keifuku Electric Railroad, and was operated as a restaurant and inn.

After the inn's closure, Komyoji Temple in Gifu took over the property in order to preserve the location and sights. The site was converted into a Buddhist temple in 2005.

== Location and access ==
The temple is located in Kamitakano, Sakyō-ku, Kyoto, on the left bank of Takano River, below the west side of Mount Hiei. It can be accessed by public transport via bus or Eizan Electric Railway through Yase-Hieizanguchi Station.

For cultural and environmental preservation reasons, the temple is only open to visitors in spring, summer, and autumn for brief periods of time.
