= Gyokuhō-in =

Buddhist sub-temple in Kyoto, Japan

Gyokuhō-in 玉鳳院
- Gyokuhō-in Gyokuhō-in (Japan)

Religion
- Affiliation: Buddhist
- Rite: Rinzai school Myōshin-ji branch

Location
- Location: 11 Hanazono-Jinomakacho, Ukyō-ku, Kyoto-shi, Kyoto-fu
- Country: Japan
- Interactive map of Gyokuhō-in 玉鳳院
- Coordinates: 35°1′29.47″N 135°43′20.76″E

Architecture
- Founder: Emperor Hanazono
- Completed: 1337
- National Place of Scenic Beauty National Historic Site of Japan

Gyokuhō-in (玉鳳院) is one of the 40+ tatchu sub-temples Myōshin-ji, a Rinzai school Zen Buddhist temple in the Hanazono neighborhood of Ukyō-ku in the city of Kyoto, Japan. It is also called the Gyokuhō-Zenkyu (玉鳳院禅宮). It is not normally open to the public.

== Overview ==
Gyokuhō-in is the oldest of Myōshin-ji's sub-temples and was founded by Emperor Hanazono in 1337. Upon entering the main gate, the Kuri (kitchen quarters) in directly in front, and a corridor connects the Hōjō (abbot's chamber) and the Kaisan-dō (Founder's chapel) where the remains of Kanzan Egen, the founder of Myoshin-ji, is buried. The fusuma paintings in the Hōjō are by Kanō Yasunobu and Kanō Toun. The Sanmon, Hōjō and the Kaisan-dō are all National Important Cultural Properties. A wooden statue of Emperor Hanazono is enshrined in the inner sanctuary. The temple was reconstructed in 1656.

To the north and south of the corridor are gardens from the early Momoyama period, including the South Garden, Mountain Garden, and Feng Shui Spring Garden. The South Garden is a Japanese dry garden covered with white sand, with cut stone steps creating geometric patterns and accented with Japanese white pine and black pine. The Mountain Garden has an artificial hill to the east of the Kaisan-dō, and features mountain-style stonework. The Feng Shui Spring Garden is a garden on the north side of the temple, and features a dry waterfall, stonework including a stone representing Mount Hōrai, and stepping stones, and a well with a water basin. The gardens were collectively designated a National Place of Scenic Beauty and National Historic Site in 1931.

Gyokuhō-in is about a ten-minute walk from Hanazono Station on the JR West San'in Main Line. To the northeast of Gyokuhō-in, there is the mausoleum of Toyotomi Hideyoshi's son, Sutemaru.

== See also ==
- List of Historic Sites of Japan (Kyoto)
- List of Places of Scenic Beauty of Japan (Kyoto)
