= Hōnen-in =

Buddhist temple in Kyoto

Coordinates: 35.0240°N 135.7974°E

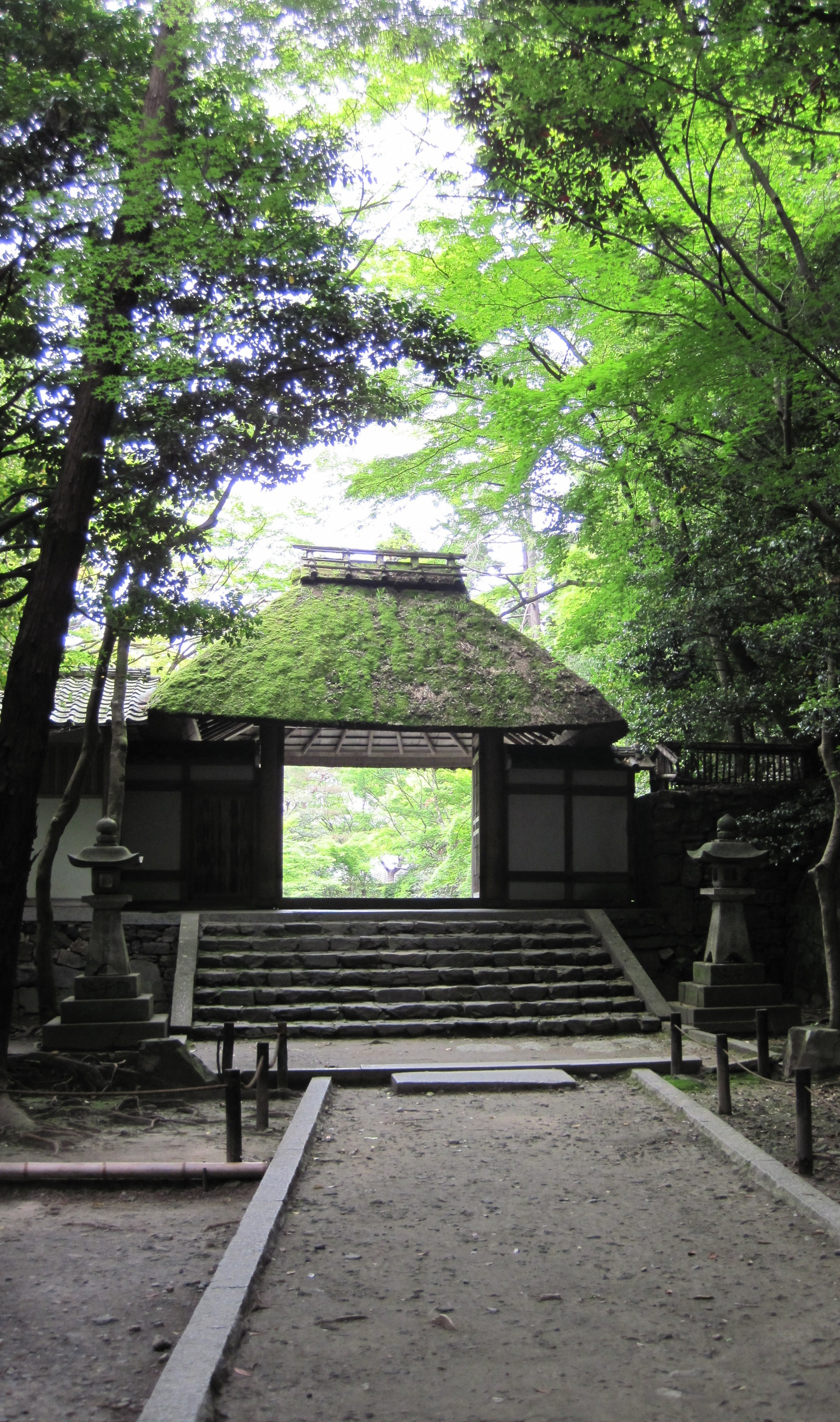
Gate to Hōnen-in

Hōnen-in (法然院) is a Buddhist temple located in Sakyō-ku, Kyoto, western Japan.

Honen-in is a single-estate temple located in Shikagaya, Sakyo-ku, Kyoto. It was originally part of the Jodo sect, but became independent and is now a single religious corporation. Its official name is Zenkisan Honen-in Manmukyoji Temple. Another name for the temple is "Honzan Shishiya Honen-in". Currently, part of the temple is open to the public for regular lectures and concerts.

== History ==
The temple is said to have originated in the Kamakura period (1185-1333), when Honen, together with his disciples, built a hermitage where they practiced the Six-Session Worship and Praise (六時礼讃).

In 1680, during the Edo period (1603-1868), Manmin, the 38th head of Chion-in, proposed the construction of a Buddhist Nembutsu dojo in a place associated with Honen, and rebuilt the temple together with his pupil, Oshin Keikaku.

Originally, it was an independent head temple within the Jodo sect, but in 1953, it became independent from the Jodo sect and became an independent religious corporation.

The current head priest is Kajita Shinsho, the 31st head priest, who took office in 1984. His father, Mineo Hashimoto, was a philosopher who served as a professor at Kobe University.

Due to its location near the Philosopher's Path, the temple attracts a large number of visitors during the spring and autumn tourist seasons.

The Nihonga painter Inshō Dōmoto received a commission from the temple to redecorate two rooms. Normally the rooms had paintings by the Kano school. Two rooms that he painted in 1971 "Soft breeze approaching" depict the Pure Land. An abstract painting, it shows willows or trees swaying in the wind.

== Precincts ==
The main hall was built in May 1681 as a guest hall. The main deity is a seated statue of Amida Nyorai, and a standing statue of Honen Shonin is also enshrined there.

Camellia Garden

Hojo - This is the former imperial palace of Emperor Gozei (built in 1595), which was moved here in 1687. The sliding door paintings by Kano Mitsunobu are designated as Important Cultural Properties.

Hojo Garden - A Pure Land garden. The famous "Zenkisui" water gushes out of the garden.

Entrance

Kura (Storage room / repository)

Jizo Pagoda

Pagoda of 100,000 souls

Auditorium - Originally a large bathroom built in 1694, it was renovated in 1977.

Belfry

Houshou Pond

Sutra Repository - Built in 1737.

Ten-story stone pagoda

White sand platform

San-mon - Thatched roof gate in the sukiya style.

Grave of Konan Naito

Grave of Hajime Kawakami

Grave of Junichiro Tanizaki

Grave of Shuzo Kuki

Grave of Seiryo Hamada

Grave of Heihachiro Fukuda

Glass Karesansui "Tsunagaru" by Sento Nishinaka. Located on the approach to the temple.

Main Gate

== Cultural Properties ==
Important Cultural Properties

Barrier painting

Paulownia and bamboo in gold (upper room of Hojo): 3 panels attached to the alcove and 4 panels on the sliding doors

Design of young pine trees in gold and underglaze blue (upper room of Hojo)

Maki and aronia in gold on fusuma (the second room of the Hojo)

Pine trees in gold and color, a pair of folding screens

== Location and access ==
30 Gosho no dan-cho, Shikatani, Sakyo-ku, Kyoto 6-minute walk from Houzen-in-cho bus stop on Kyoto City Express Bus Route 100; 10-minute walk from Jodoji bus stop on Kyoto City Express Bus Routes 5, 17, 203, and 204; 3-minute walk from Minami Tamachi bus stop on Kyoto City Express Bus Route 32. There is no charge to visit the temple grounds, and visitors are free to enter the temple from 6:00 to 16:00.

The main hall and other buildings are usually closed to the public. The buildings are open to the public twice a year. The spring open house is from April 1 to 7, and the fall open house is from November 1 to 7. During these times, student guides from the university's antiquities club and other groups will be on hand. The auditorium is currently used as a rental gallery, and various exhibitions such as small-scale photography and painting shows are held there with free admission.
