= Manshu-in =

Buddhist monastery in Kyoto, Japan

Coordinates: 35°2′55.74″N 135°48′11″E

Manshu-in (曼殊院, Manshu-in)
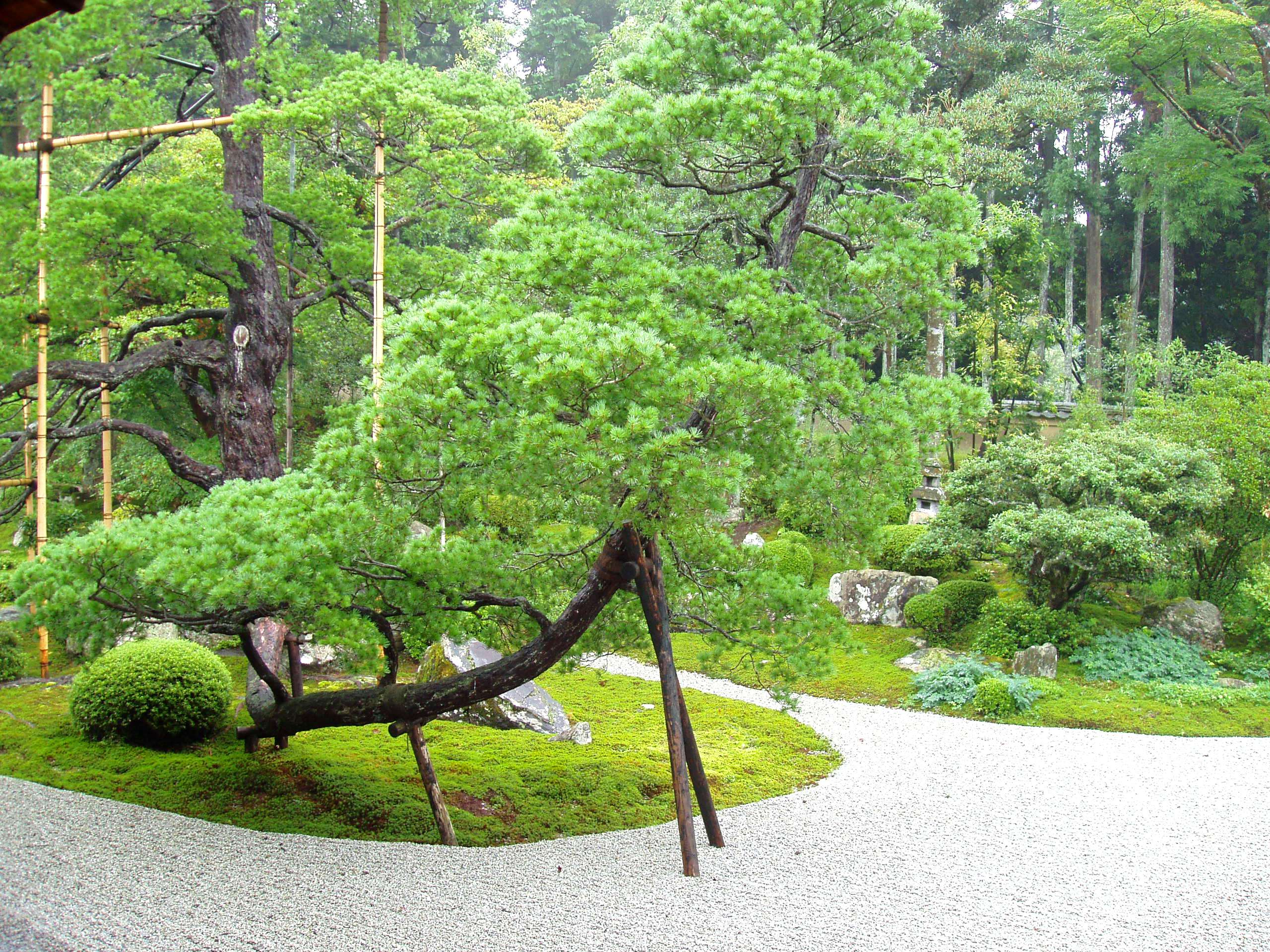
- Garden with Pinus pentaphylla

Religion
- Affiliation: Tendai

Location
- Location: Sakyō-ku, Kyoto
- Country: Japan
- Interactive map of Manshu-in (曼殊院, Manshu-in)

Architecture
- Completed: 8th century

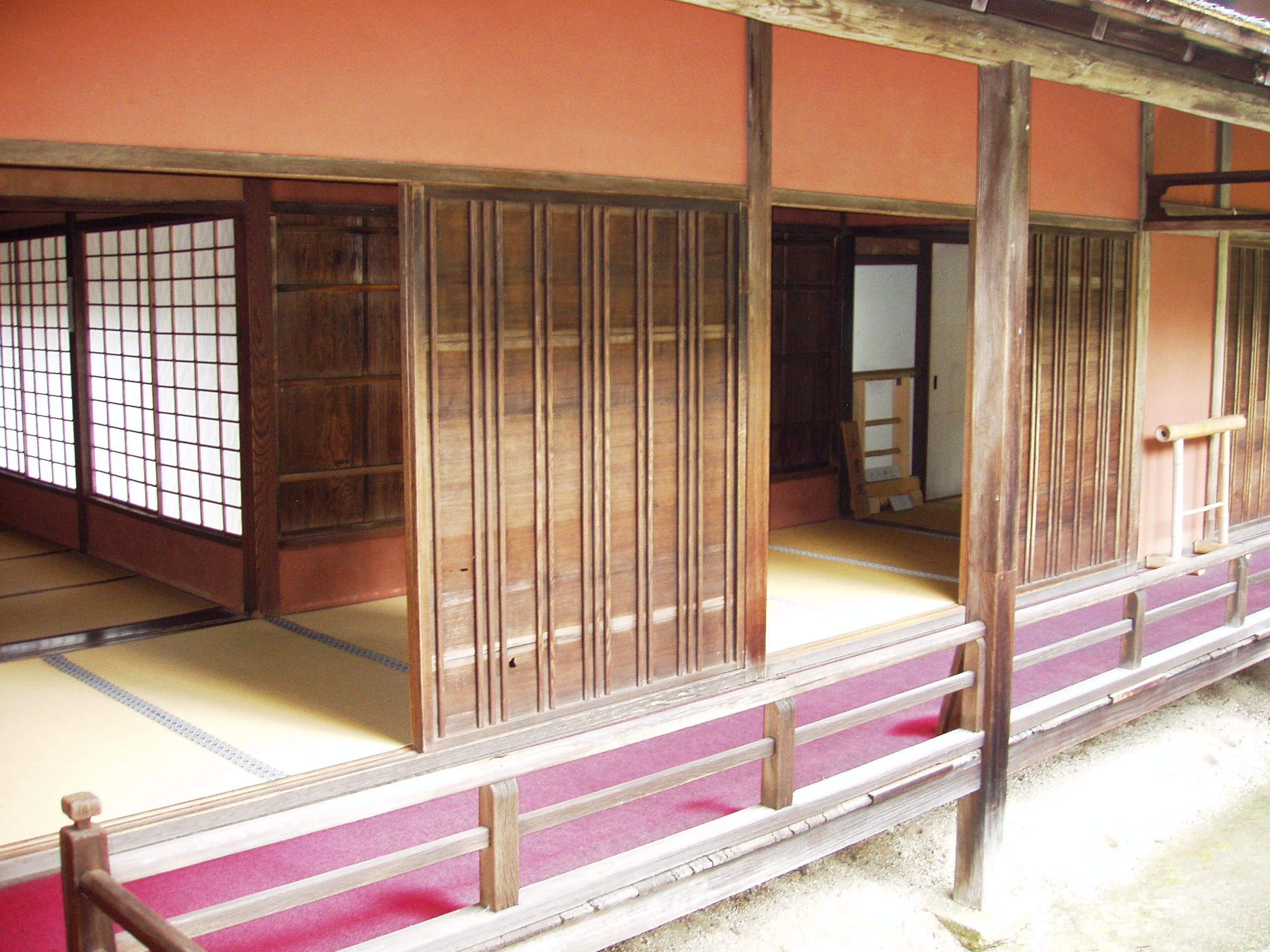
Small shoin

Manshu-in (曼殊院, Manshu-in), also known as the Manshuin Monzeki, is a Tendai monastery located near the Shugakuin Imperial Villa at Sakyō-ku, Ichijo-ji, Takenouchi-cho, in northeast Kyoto, Japan.

The monastery was founded by Dengyō Daishi in the 8th century. It was then located near Mount Hiei and known as Tobibo, but renamed Manshuin in 1108 or 1109. In the early Edo period the monastery moved to its current site. Today the monastery is notable both for its buildings and a fine garden – the gardens of the Manshu-in shoin are a nationally designated Place of Scenic Beauty.

The entry building contains a Tiger Room with images said to have been painted by Kanō Eitoku (1543–1590), Bamboo Room with Edo wood-block prints, and Peacock Room with pictures by Ganku (1749/56–1839). The main temple (Great Shoin) dates from the early Edo period, and is now listed as an Important Cultural Property. It contains a Waterfall Room with slides by Kanō Tan'yū (1602–1674), and Snowy Scenes Room with screen pictures by the same artist and shelves much like those in the Katsura Imperial Villa. The smaller hall (Small Shoin) is also an important culture property; it contains the Mount Fuji Room (pictures by Kanō Tanyū on the sliding doors); Twilight Room with royal throne and more paintings by Kano; and a tea room.

The major garden is in the Karesansui style, and now designated as an eminent scenery; it contains a notable Pinus pentaphylla tree, now about 400 years old, set within an "island" on a stream of white sand. The inner garden is quite small, and features a stone basin and old well.

== See also ==
- List of National Treasures of Japan (paintings)
- List of National Treasures of Japan (writings)
