= Ishikawa Jōzan =

Japanese samurai (1583–1672)

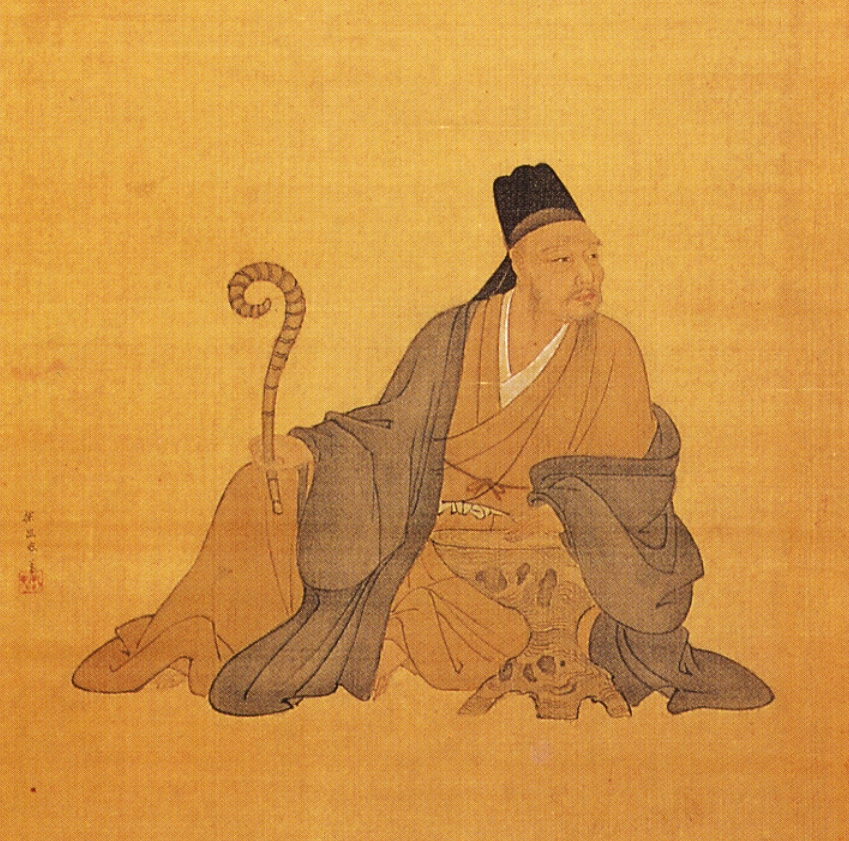
- Ishikawa Jōzan, dated 1662
- Born: 1583; Anjō, Aichi, Japan
- Died: 23 May 1672 (aged 88–89); Kyoto, Japan
- Occupations: Poet, philosopher, tea master, garden designer

Philosophical work
- Era: Edo period

Ishikawa Jōzan (石川丈山; 1583 - May 23, 1672) was a samurai and a literai from the Azuchi-Momoyama period to the early Edo period. He was a representative figure of Chinese poetry in the early Edo period, and was also well versed in Neo-Confucianism, calligraphy, tea ceremony, and Japanese garden design.

His given name was Shigeyuki at first, later Aku, His nickname was Mitsuya at first, later Kaemon. His pen names were Rokuroku Sanjin, Shimei Sanjin, Akutotsu Ka, Shisendo, Daisetsu, Urin, Yamaki, Yamamura, Yabusato, Tokei, and Mitsuashi.

== Biography ==
Ishikawa Jōzan was born in Izumigō, Hekikai County, Mikawa Province (present-day Izumichō, Anjō, Aichi) to a family of hereditary samurai who had served the Matsudaira clan for generations. He studied martial arts under his great-uncle and in 1598, he became a close attendant to Tokugawa Ieyasu, and was trusted for his loyalty.

He participated in the Osaka Summer Campaign and made a great achievement, but he was not rewarded as he had disobeying orders for the vanguard not to participate in combat. Having disobeyed military orders, he became a rōnin and retired to the temple of Myōshin-ji. Around 1617, he studied Confucianism under Fujiwara Seika at the recommendation of his acquaintance Hayashi Razan. Jōzan's reputation for excellence in both literature and martial arts led to him receiving many offers of service from various places. He served the Asano clan in Wakayama, but returned to Kyoto after a few months. Later, he returned to serve the Asano clan to care for his sick mother. He then followed the Asano clan's transfer to Hiroshima Domain and spent about 13 years there. When his mother died, he asked to retire, but was not allowed to do so. He pretended to be ill and left Hiroshima. In 1636, he built Suichikudō near Shōkoku-ji and retired there.

In 1641, he built the Shisendō temple in Ichijōji Village (west foot of Mount Hiei) in northern Kyoto. Following the example of the Kasendo of Kinoshita Chōshōshi, a hermit in the eastern Kyoto area, he selected 36 poets from throughout Chinese history as the Thirty-Six Immortals of Poetry. He had Kanō Tan'yū paint their portraits, which he hung on each of the four small walls on the second floor of the hall. Jōzan devoted himself to sencha tea and Japanese garden design; the garden at Higashi Hongan-ji Kikaku Residence (Shōsei-en) was designed by Jōzan. He was invited into the service of Emperor Go-Mizunoo, but he declined. He spent the next 30 years devoted to his studies, living in simple poverty, and died at the age of 90 in 1672.

== Ishikawa Jōzan grave ==
The grave of Ishikawa Jōzan is located in Ichijōji Matsubara-chō, Sakyo-ku, Kyoto. The grave is a natural stone about 2.5 meters high located on the top of Mount Chayama, 350 meters southeast of Shisen-dō. It was designated a National Historic Site in 1928.

== See also ==
- List of Historic Sites of Japan (Kyoto)
