= Sakyō-ku =

Sakyō 左京区
- Ward of Kyoto
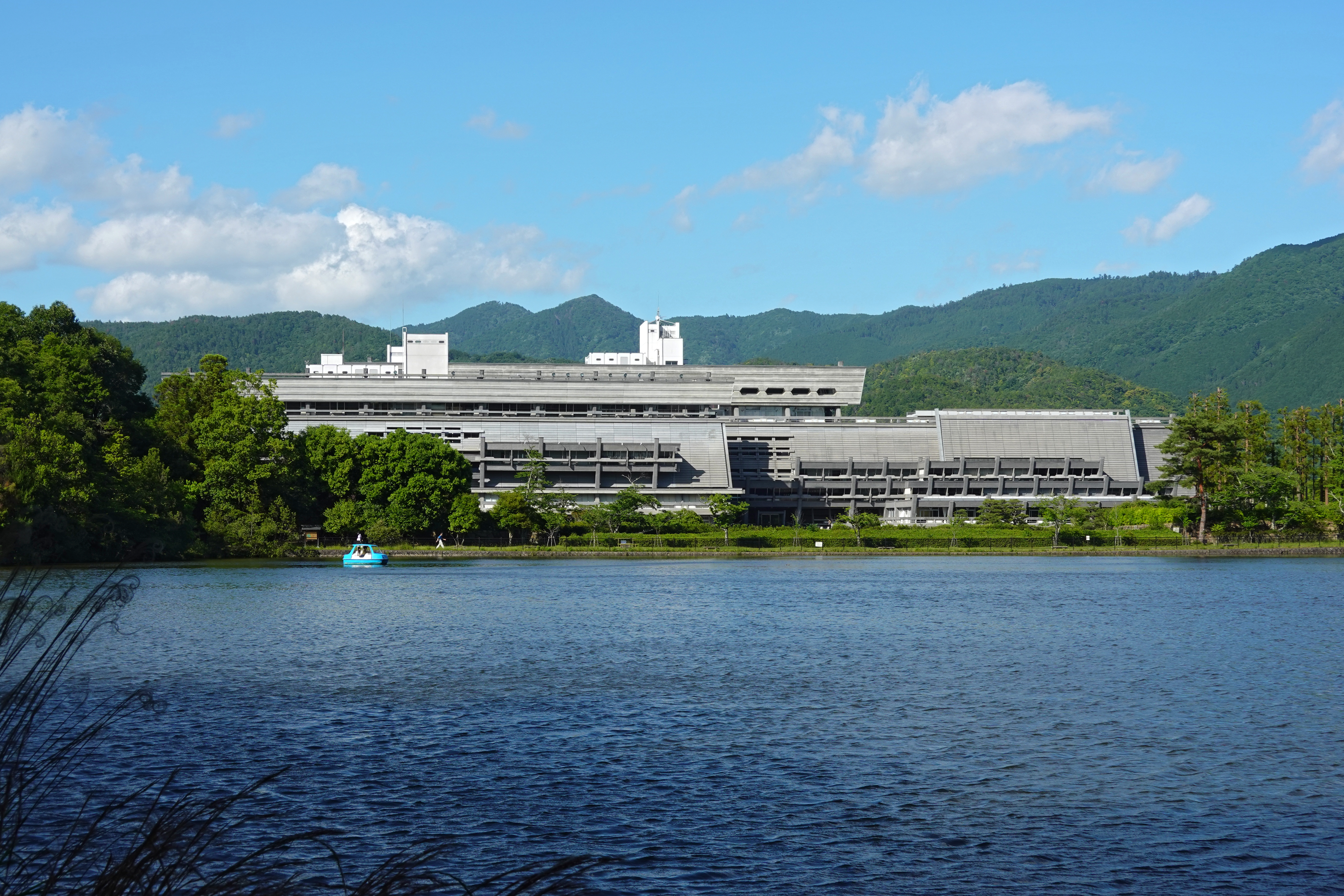
- Kyoto International Conference Center

- Location of Sakyō-ku in Kyoto

- Location of Sakyō-ku in Japan
- Coordinates: 35°2′55″N 135°46′42″E
- Country: Japan
- Prefecture: Kyoto
- Founded: 1929

Area
  - Total: 246.77 km^{2} (95.28 sq mi)
- Highest elevation: 971 m (3,186 ft)
- Lowest elevation: 40 m (130 ft)

Population (October 1, 2020)
  - Total: 166,039
  - Estimate (2021): 164,963
  - Density: 672.85/km^{2} (1,742.7/sq mi)
- Time zone: UTC+9 (Japan Standard Time)
- Website: www.city.kyoto.lg.jp/sakyo/

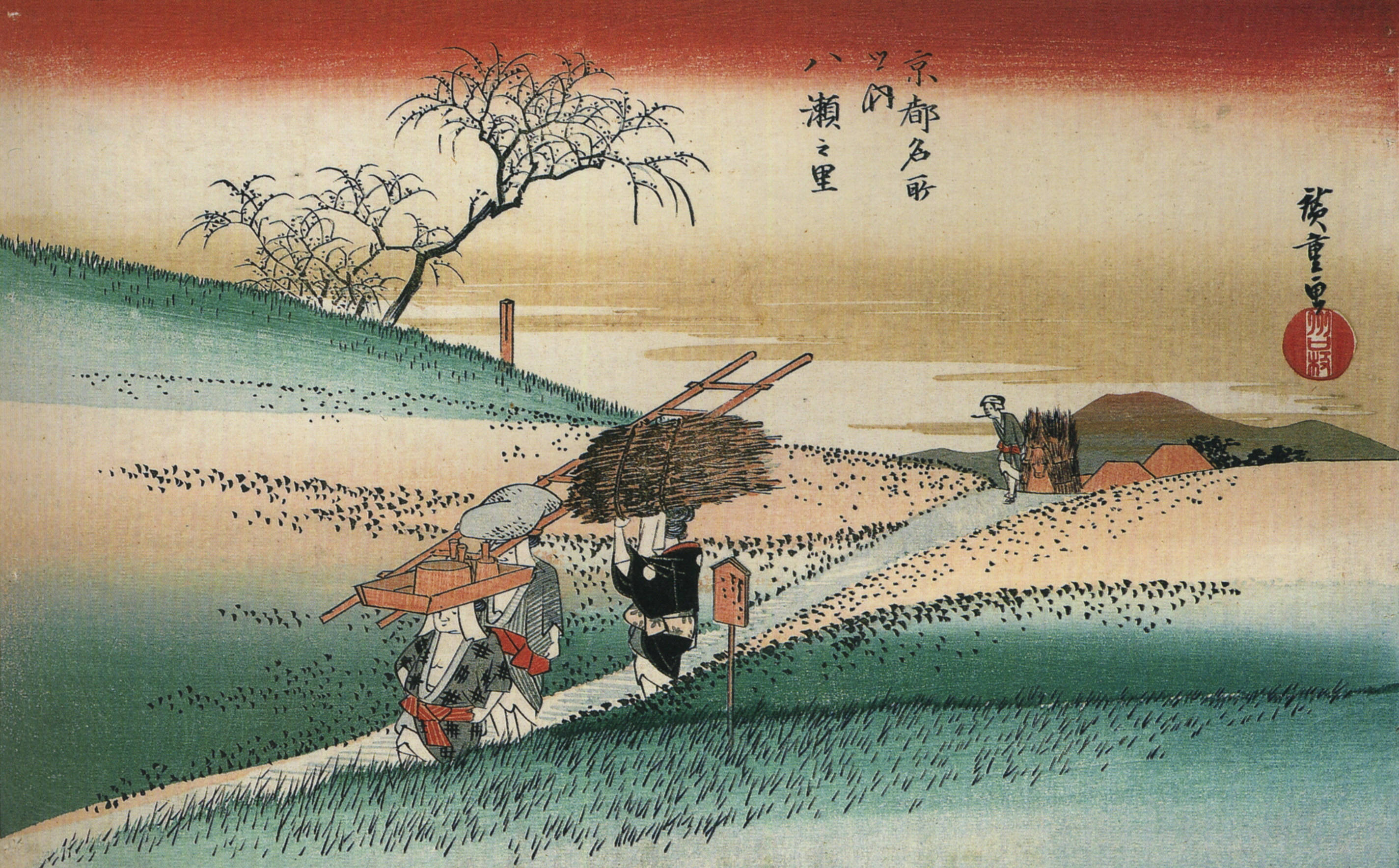
This ukiyo-e by Hiroshige shows Yase, a village now in Sakyō-ku, during the Edo period.

Sakyō-ku (左京区, Sakyō-ku) is one of the eleven wards in the city of Kyoto, in Kyoto Prefecture, Japan. It is located in the northeastern part of the city.

== History ==
The meaning of sakyō (左京) is "on the Emperor's left." When residing in the Kyoto Imperial Palace the emperor would sit facing south, thus the eastern direction would be to his left. Similarly, there is a ward to the west called Ukyō-ku (右京区), meaning "the ward on the Emperor's right." In old times, sakyō was referring to the eastern part of the capital, but the present Sakyō-ku is bounded to the west by the Kamo River and is thus outside the historical capital.

It was created in 1929 when it was split off from Kamigyō-ku.

== Geography ==
It is located in the north-east corner of Kyoto city. In the east, it borders the city of Ōtsu in Shiga Prefecture. In the south Sanjō Street separates it from Higashiyama-ku and Yamashina-ku. In the north, it borders the city of Nantan in Kyoto Prefecture and Takashima in Shiga Prefecture. In central Kyoto, the Kamo River flows on the western border of this ward.

Areas like Iwakura have been designated urbanization control areas, where large-scale exploitation and erection of tall buildings is restricted. Many rice fields remain in this area. The northern part of Sakyō-ku is mountainous and has a thriving forest industry.

The large streets Kawabata, Higashiōji and Shirakawa run from south to north. The train station Demachiyanagi is the terminal for both the Keihan railway with trains running south to Osaka, and the Eizan railway running north to Yase and Kurama.

== Demographics ==
According to census data, the population of Sakyō-ku has been decreasing since 1980.

Historical population
Year	Pop.	±%
1930	97,448	—
1940	127,571	+30.9%
1950	152,148	+19.3%
1960	177,692	+16.8%
1970	188,434	+6.0%
1980	185,645	−1.5%
1990	173,282	−6.7%
2000	171,556	−1.0%
2010	168,802	−1.6%
2020	166,039	−1.6%

== Sights ==
Famous places located inside Sakyō-ku include Ginkaku-ji, Nanzen-ji, Kamo Shrine, Heian Shrine, and Hōnen-in. See also: Rurikō-in Buddhist temple

In the northern parts are Kuramadera, Kifunejinja, Sanzen-in, the ruins of a house where Iwakura Tomomi was imprisoned, the Shugakuin Imperial Villa and Manshuin Temple, and the Kyoto International Conference Hall where the Kyoto Protocol was adopted.

Sakyō-ku also contains the Kyoto Botanical Garden and several of the mountains lit up during the yearly Gozan no Okuribi festival, including the main Daimonji-yama.

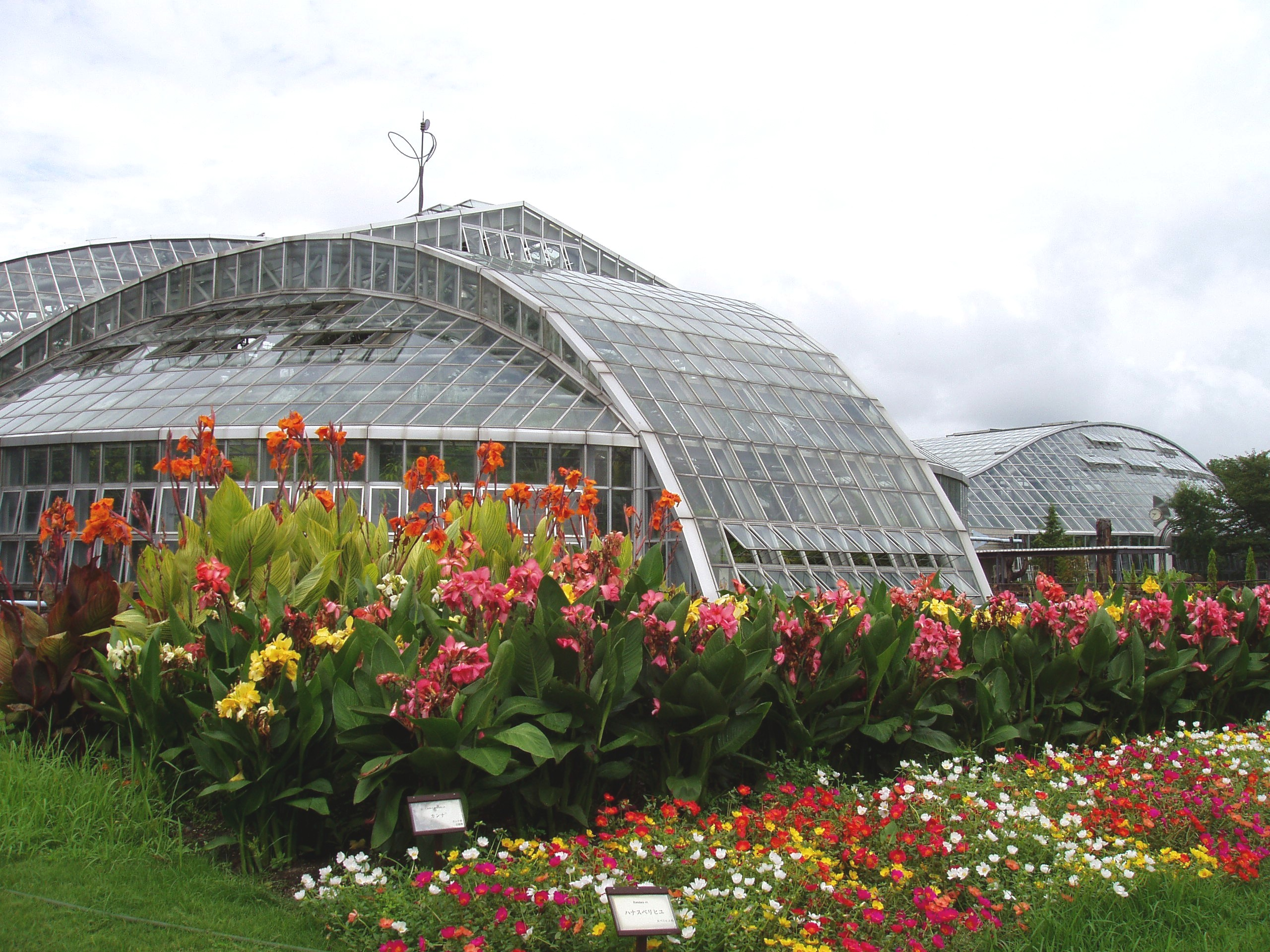
The conservatory of the Kyoto Botanical Garden

The South Korean government maintains the Korea Education Institution (Korean: 교토한국교육원, Japanese: 京都韓国教育院) in Sakyō-ku.

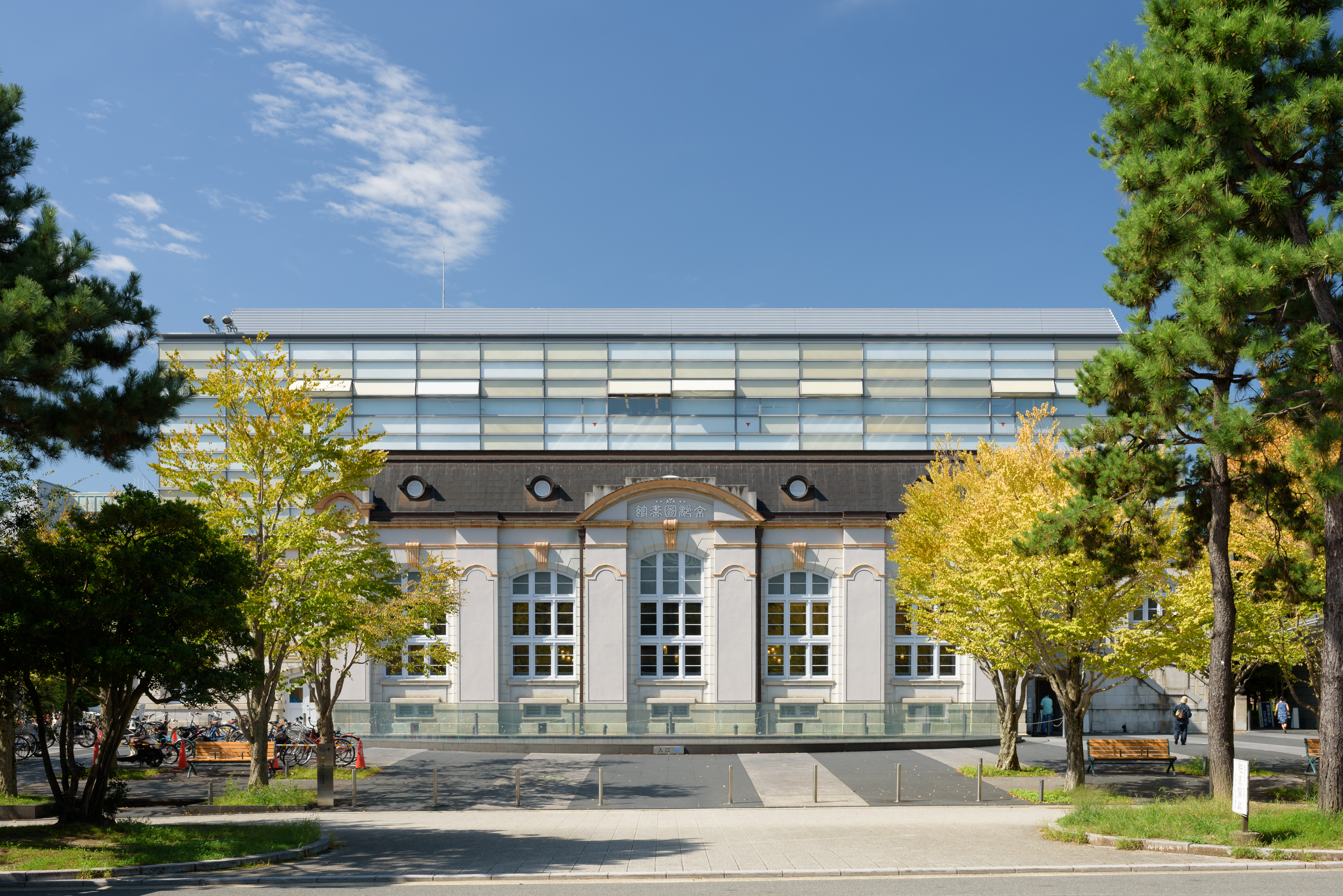
Kyoto Prefectural Library

== Education ==
The ward contains 23 elementary schools (of which 3 are private), 7 public middle schools, and 7 public high schools. It also has 5 private schools that are both middle and high schools.

Several universities are located in the ward, including the prominent Kyoto University.

- Kyoto College of Graduate Studies for Informatics
- Kyoto Institute of Technology
- Kyoto Notre Dame University
- Kyoto Prefectural University
- Kyoto Seika University
- Kyoto University
- Kyoto University of the Arts

The Kyoto Korean Junior High-High School, a North Korean school, is in the ward.
