= Bilevel rail car =

Railroad car with two levels (double decker)

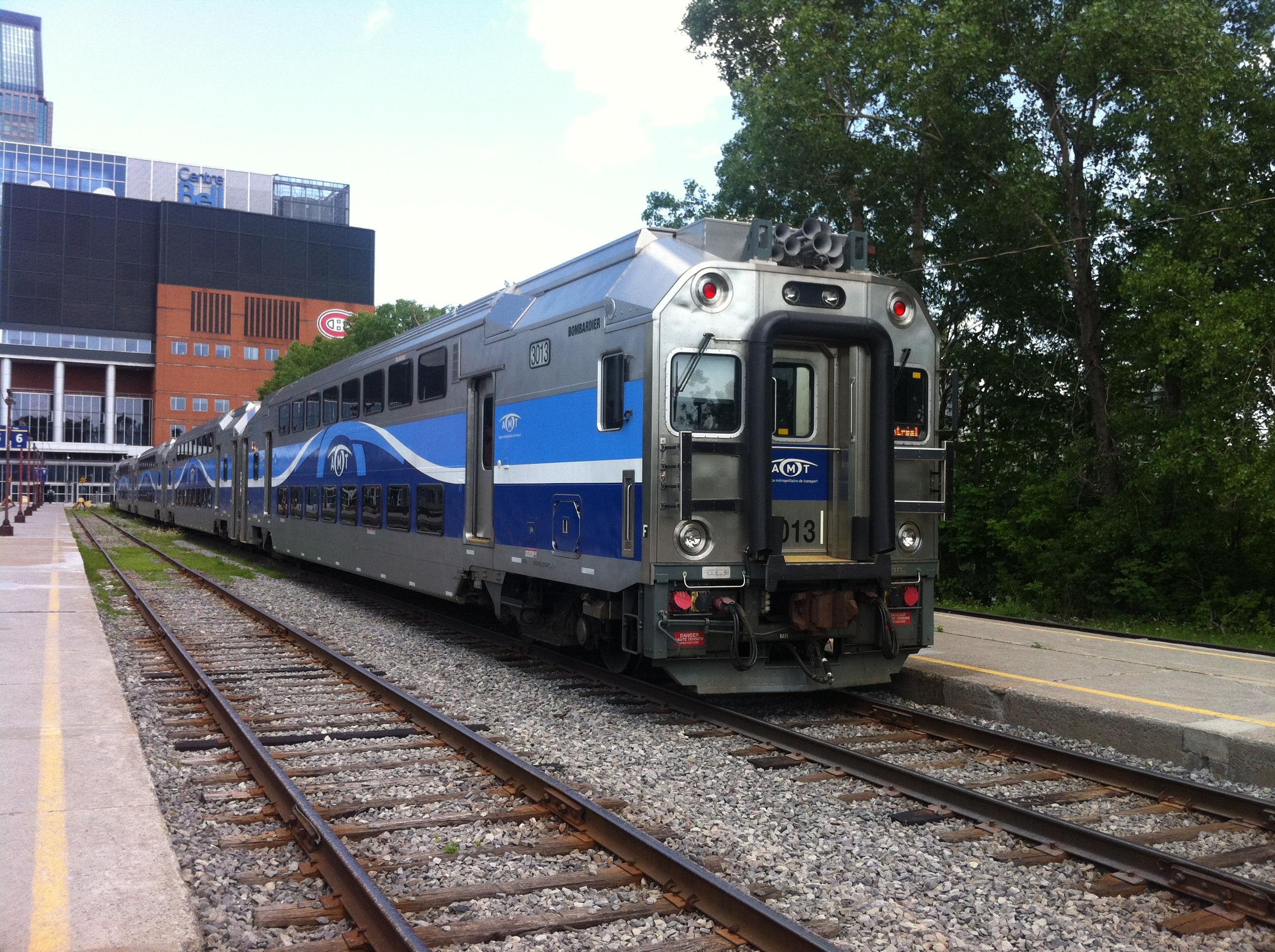
Bombardier MultiLevel Coach double-deck rail car operated by Exo in Montreal, Quebec in Canada. The Lucien-L'Allier station is in the background.

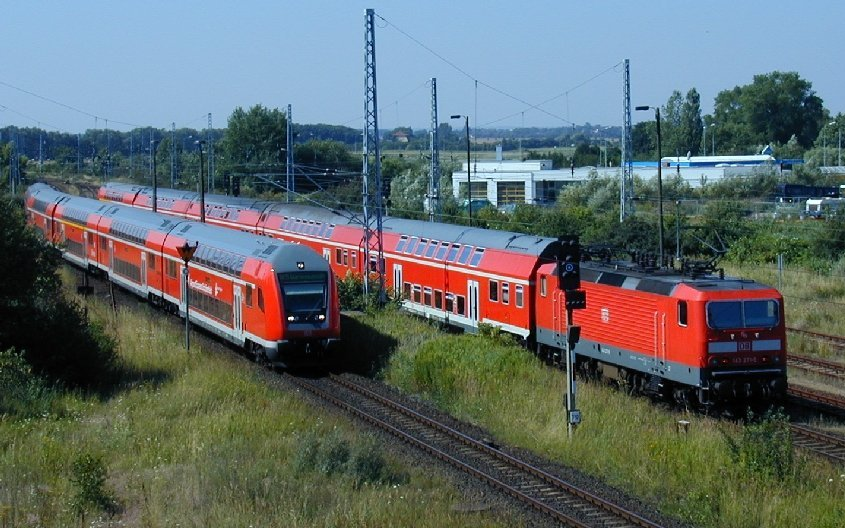
Bombardier Double-deck Coaches in Germany, used extensively on Regional-Express trains (here: Rostock S-Bahn)

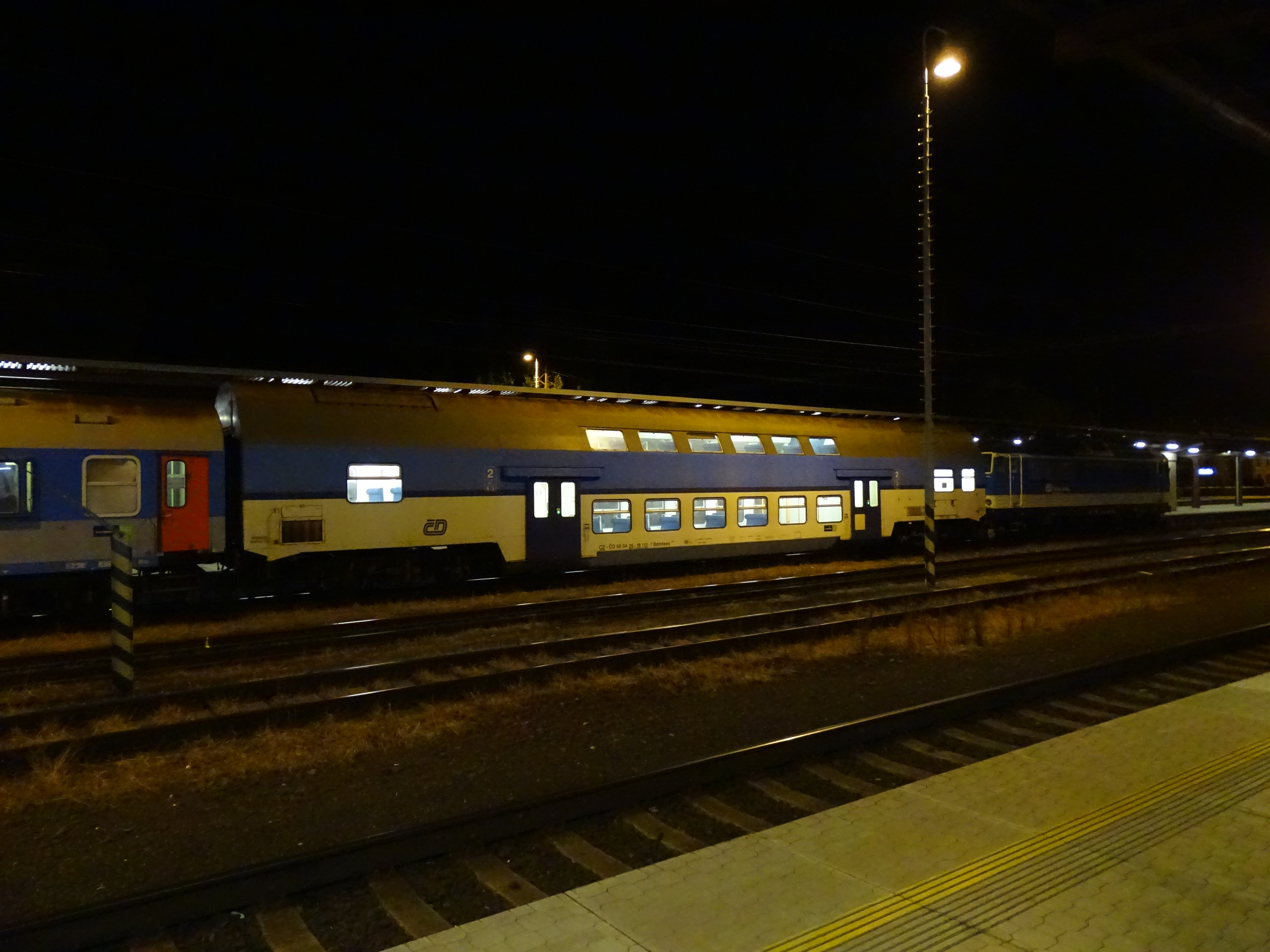
Czech Railways Class Bdmteeo294 in Kolín, Czech Republic.

A bilevel car (American English) or double-decker coach (British English and Canadian English) is a type of rail car that has two levels of passenger accommodation as opposed to one, increasing passenger capacity (up to 57% per car in extreme cases).

The use of double-decker carriages, where feasible, can resolve capacity problems on a railroad, avoiding other options which have an associated infrastructure cost such as longer trains (which require longer station platforms), more trains per hour (which the signalling or safety requirements may not allow) or adding extra tracks besides the existing line.

Double deck trains are claimed to be more energy efficient, and may have a lower operating cost per passenger. A bi-level car may carry up to about twice as many as a normal car, if structure and loading gauges permit, without requiring double the weight to pull or material to build. However, a bi-level train may take longer to exchange passengers at each station, since more people will enter and exit from each car. The increased dwell time makes them most popular on long-distance routes which make fewer stops (and may be popular with passengers for offering a better view).

Double deck cars may not be usable in countries or on older railroad systems with low loading gauge, most notably the majority of the British railway network. In some countries such as the UK new lines are built to a higher than the existing structure gauge to allow the use of double-deck trains in future.

== History ==
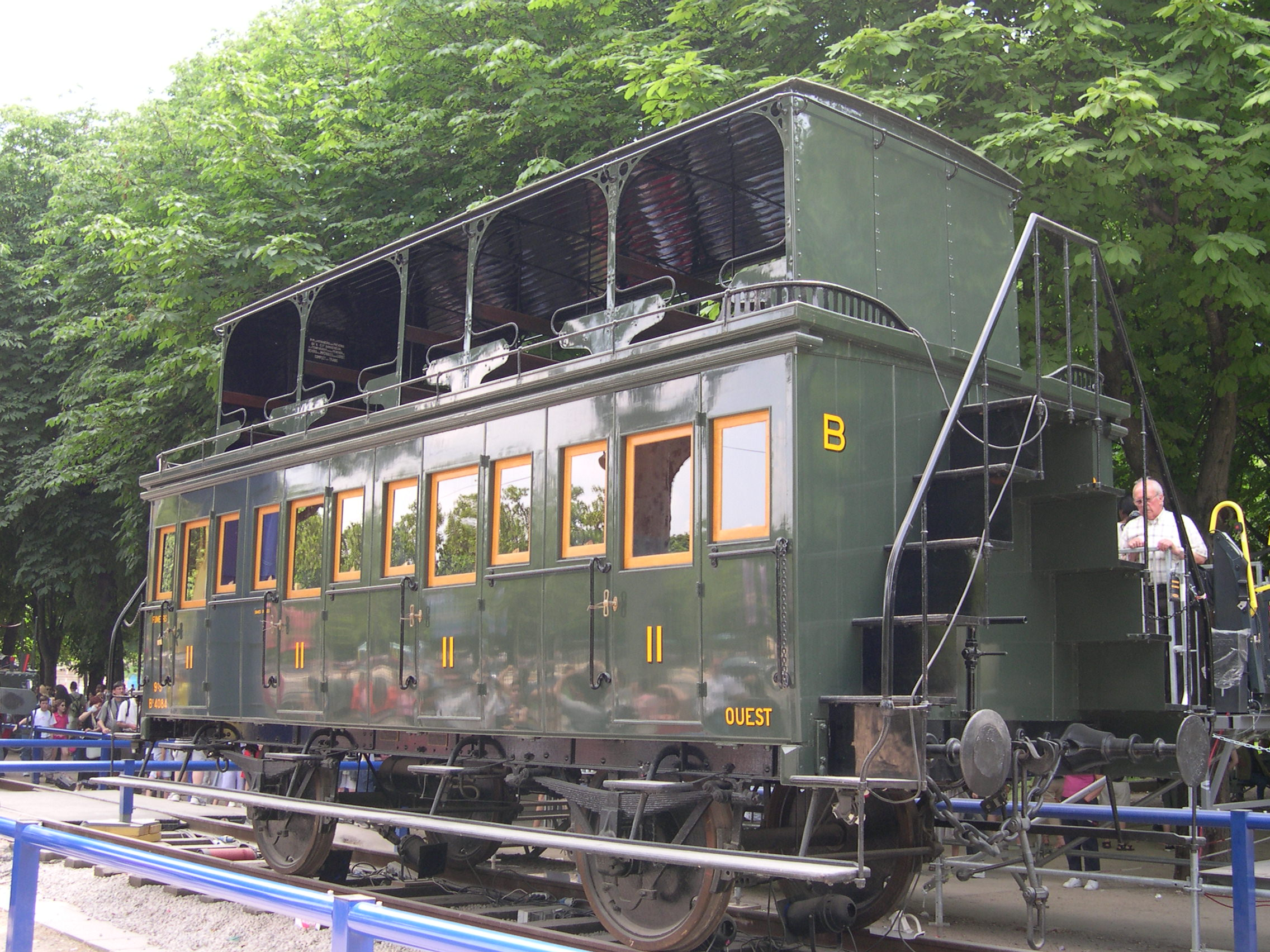
Voiture à impériale

Double deck carriages date to at least as early as the second half of the 19th century. In France several hundred voitures à impériale with seats on the roof were in use by the Chemins de fer de l'Ouest, Chemins de fer de l'Est and Chemins de fer du Nord by 1870, having been in use for over 2 decades; the upper deck was open at the sides with a light roof or awning covering the seats. In the 1860s, M.J.B. Vidard introduced two-storied carriages on the Chemins de fer de l'Est, with a full body, windows, and doors; the same design lowered the floor of the lower storey to keep the center of gravity low. Vidard's carriages had a total height of 13 feet 8 inches (4.17 m) with the head height in the lower part of the carriage only 5 feet 5 inches (1.65 m); the carriages had a capacity of 80 persons (third class) in a 2 axle vehicle of 13 tons fully loaded. The first all-steel Chemins de fer de l'État bilevels are an early example of split-level cars.

The Chicago, Burlington and Quincy Railroad placed bilevel Gallery cars in commuter service in the Chicago area in 1950. These were successful, and led to the Atchison, Topeka and Santa Fe Railway introducing long-distance Hi-Level cars on Chicago–Los Angeles El Capitan streamliner in 1954.

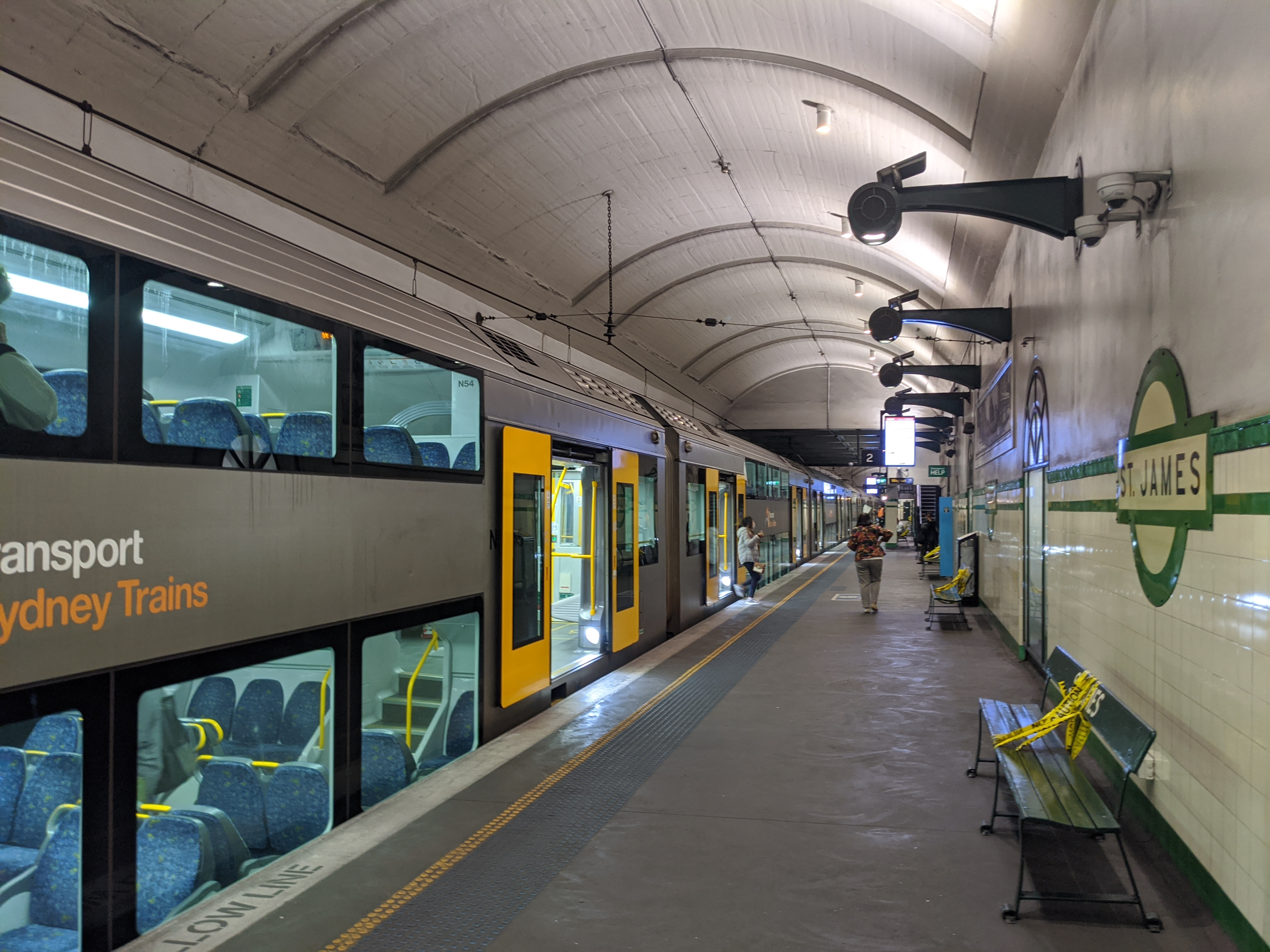
Double Decker train in Sydney

In Sydney, Australia the first 120 double-deck trailer cars entered service in 1964, being incorporated into the usual eight-car configuration used in Sydney, coupled to existing single-deck power cars. In 1968, four experimental double-deck power cars entered service, resulting in the world's first fully double-deck electric multiple unit passenger train.

== Typical design ==
The double-deck design usually includes lowering the bottom floor to below the top level of the wheels, closer to the rails, and then adding an upper floor above. Such a design will fit under more bridges, tunnels and power wires (structure gauge). For cost and safety, this design also minimizes car height (loading gauge) and lowers the centre of gravity.

Depending on train station platform heights, three designs can be used for entry – high platforms require use of a "split level" car design, where the doors are located on a middle level, with access into the upper or lower level branching off – with stairs or ramps going both up and down (sometimes this configuration includes a section of seating at the middle level in the entry section, with double levels only in part of the lengths of the car). For low train station platforms, a "two-floor" design with level entry onto the lower floor is used. Occasionally a third, very tall "two floors over-wheel" design is used. This is a traditional single floor car "with a second story" design which, when using a low platform, requires steps up to a traditional floor height and then internal stairs up to the upper floor.

== Platform height and floor height issues ==
There are four important height measurements above the railhead: platform height, traditional floor height, downstairs floor height and upstairs floor height. Platform height determines the level entry height for wheeled objects, such as luggage, strollers, wheelchairs and bicycles. Platform height is ideally standardized across all stations the train serves. Traditional rail car floor height matters for end doors connecting to existing single floor rail cars. Downstairs or lowest floor height is primarily determined by the thickness of the beams connecting the span between the wheels and bogies (trucks) of a rail car. The upstairs floor or highest floor height is above the lowest floor and must fit under bridges and tunnels. Level entry floor height must match the platform height. Hopefully either the traditional or downstairs floor height already matches the platform height. Despite the name "bilevel" or "double-decker", for maximum compatibility the rail car will have up to four different floor heights. High platform design (Using outside steps to avoid having a level entry from the platform) is troublesome.

=== Common low-platform design ===
Most low-platform double-decker trains have level entry onto the lower level of the car, allowing wheelchair access. There are two-floor heights (upstairs and downstairs) in these "bilevel" cars. There is a staircase between floors inside the car. Connecting doors between cars are either at the (higher) upper floor or at an intermediate level over the bogies. In the former case, connecting directly to a single level car causes drag and connecting door problems.

In the western USA, cars are of the upper-level-connection type. They use low-platform stations, because the traditional single floor trains all had exterior entry steps to maximize flexibility (emergency and temporary stops) and minimize infrastructure costs. There are no examples of two-floor platforms, so there are no platform doors on the upper floor. Car roof lines lengthwise are flat for connecting doors to the upstairs of bi-level cars. A Pullman-Standard / Bombardier Amtrak Superliner car is 16 feet 2 inches (4,928 mm) tall.

=== Uncommon very tall design ===
There are several very tall bilevel cars (e.g. the Colorado Railcar DMU is 19 feet 9 1/2 inches (6.033 m) tall). They typically are described as a traditional rail car with a second story. Most of these cars serve low platforms so they have exterior steps up to the traditional "over-wheel" floor height e.g. US 51 in (1,295 mm). End doors connect at the traditional height of existing rolling stock. Some cars have upstairs end doors as well. Many of these cars also include outside balconies on either the upper or lower level. Upstairs and downstairs connect by interior stairs. These cars can fit most able people, but lack level entry. On almost all these cars the upper level consists of a full-length glass dome. Some cars are self-propelled multiple units so using traditional floor heights appears fixed. In towed cars, it is possible to lower the downstairs floor between the wheels/bogies so that level entry is possible with more than 500 mm (19 5/8 in) of added headroom and interior steps from that floor to the traditional floor.

== Operators ==
=== Argentina ===
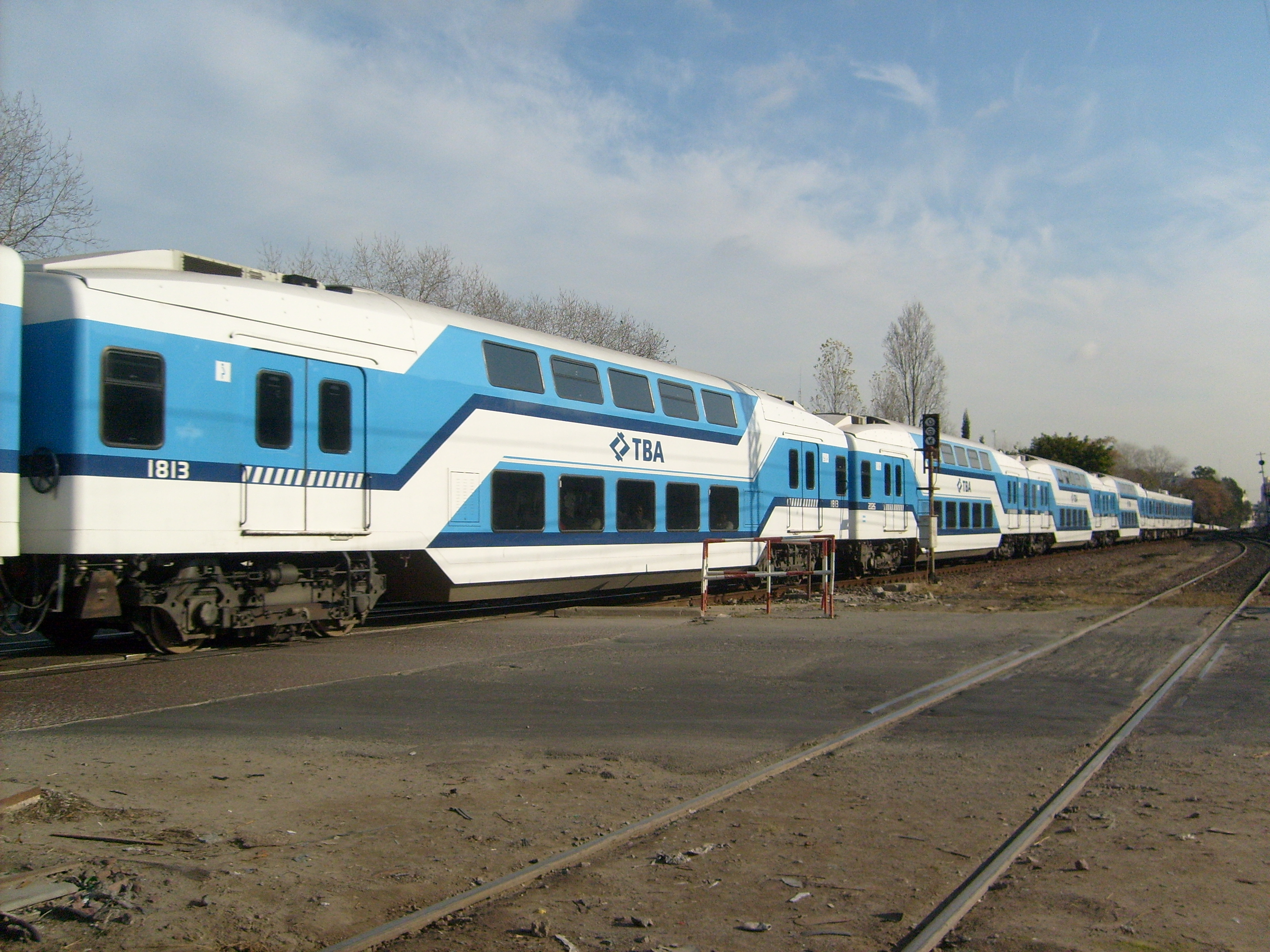
Argentine double-decker electric coaches.

In 2005, Emprendimientos Ferroviarios (Emfer), Trenes de Buenos Aires (TBA (Trains of Buenos Aires)), National Institute of Industrial Technology and the Argentine National Government subscribed to a framework agreement to start the national designing and construction of bi-level electric trains. This was decided due to the overwhelming and increasing number of passengers using the 1,676 mm (5 ft 6 in) gauge urban Sarmiento Line, serving the centre and east of Greater Buenos Aires. The first prototype was released in 2005, but mass-production only started in mid 2008. In 2013, these coaches were retired from the line and replaced with new CSR Electric Multiple Units, though it remains unclear if the Emfer trains will be moved elsewhere in the country.

In 2010, Emprendimientos Ferroviarios and Trenes de Buenos Aires presented non-engined double-decker coaches for a 100 km (62 mi) diesel interurban link between Buenos Aires and Mercedes city. Attending to different technical needs, the new coaches have only two simple non-automatic doors in the ends (instead of the two electric double doors in the middle) and were designed for low platforms.

For 2020, a public tender was launched by Trenes Argentinos to recover these double-decker coaches, for inter-urban and long-distance services, equipping them with reclining seats, USB inputs and other amenities.

=== Australia ===
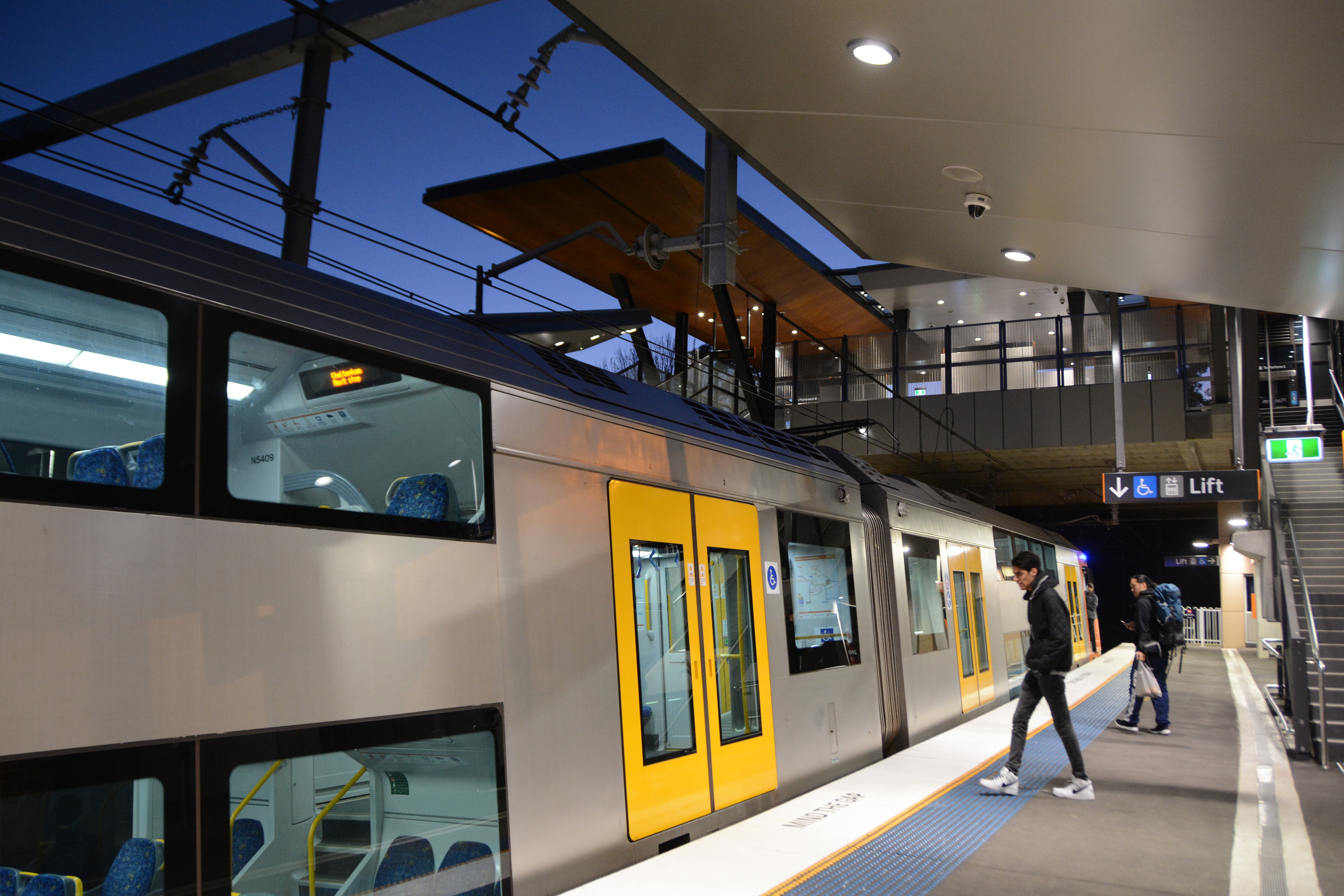
Sydney Trains A set

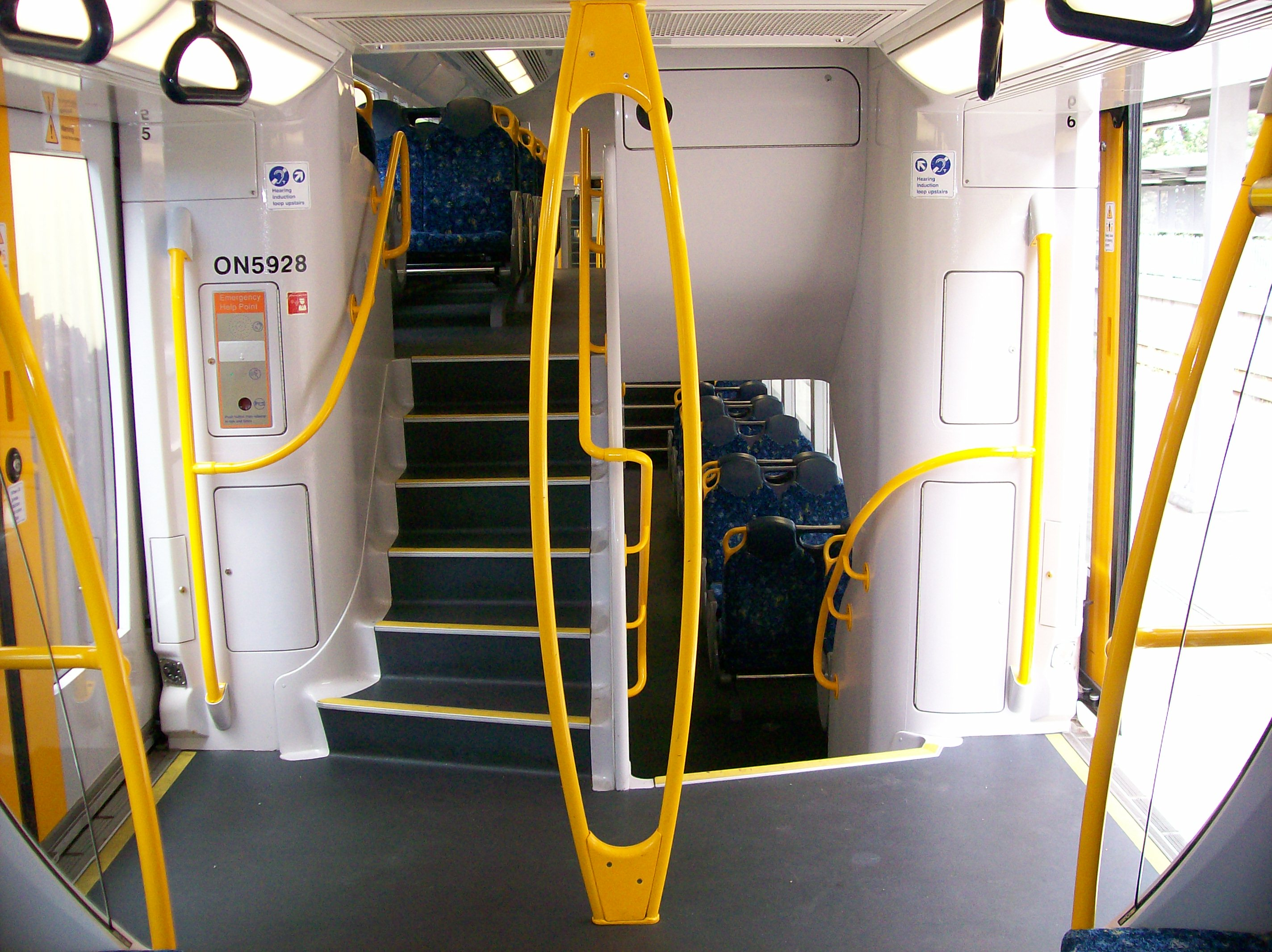
Interior of a NSW TrainLink H set carriage in Sydney

In 1964, Tulloch Limited built the first double-decker trailer cars for use in Sydney. They ran with single deck electric motor cars. After the success of the trailers, Tulloch built four experimental double decker power cars in 1968.

From 1972, more double decker multiple units were constructed by Comeng and Goninan. These are now known as the S sets. All electric suburban and interurban trains in Greater Sydney are now double deck, though the Sydney Metro uses single deck carriages. All double deck carriages have two doors per side per carriage, with a vestibule at each end at platform height. The Sydney double deck commuter trains are 14 ft 4 1/2 in (4,382 mm) high.

The Public Transport Corporation in Melbourne ordered a prototype Double Deck Development and Demonstration train in 1991, a modification of the Tangara design used in Sydney. It suffered frequent breakdowns and spent long periods out of use. It was withdrawn in 2002 and scrapped in 2006.

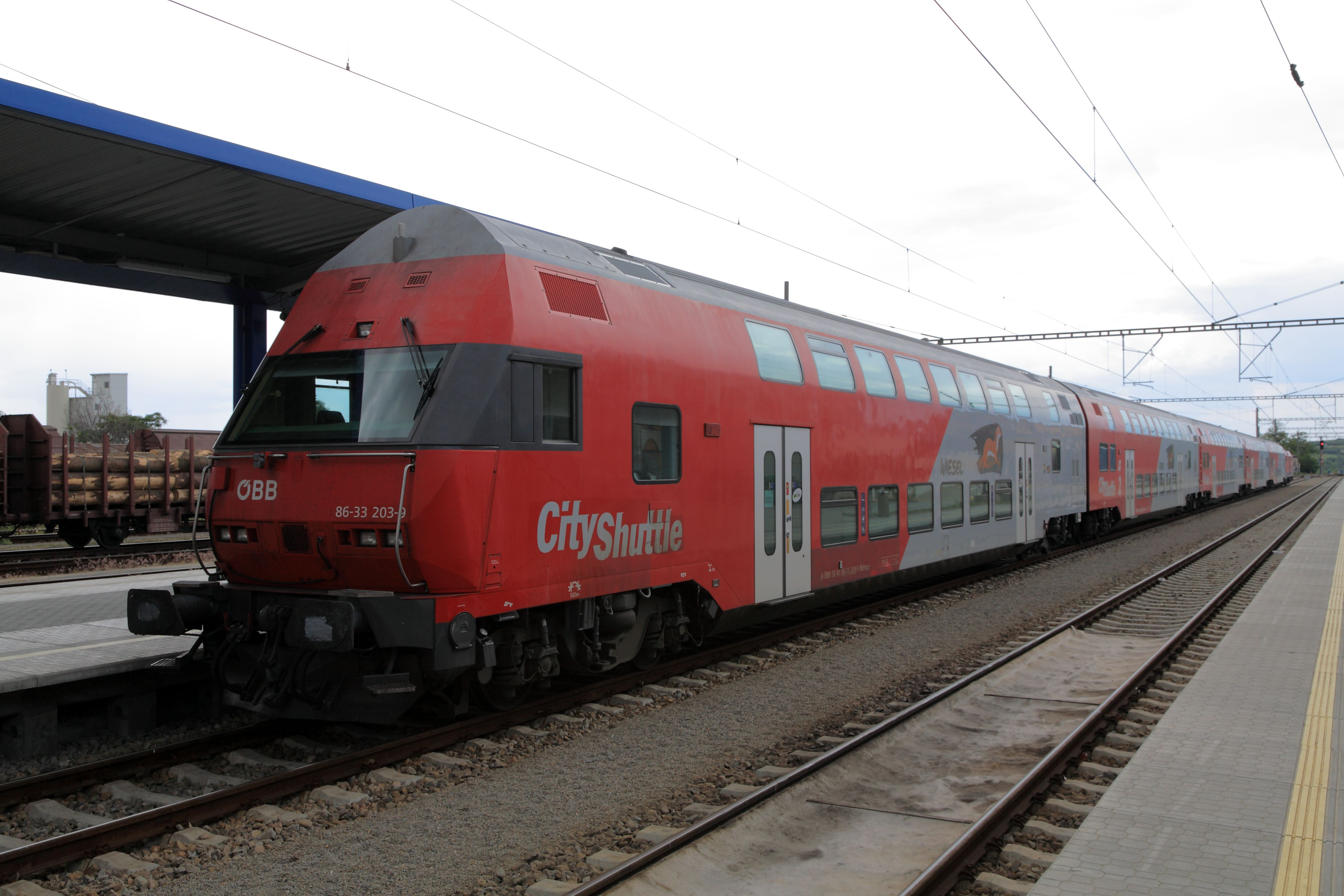
ÖBB bilevel car train

=== Austria ===
Historically, bilevel cars were implemented in 1873 and were in use until World War I. In 1993, the railway company Graz-Köflacher Bahn started to use 15 cars for suburban transport around the city of Graz. In 1997, the national railway company ÖBB ordered 120 bilevel cars for the use in Eastern Austria and Vienna metropolitan area.

=== Canada ===
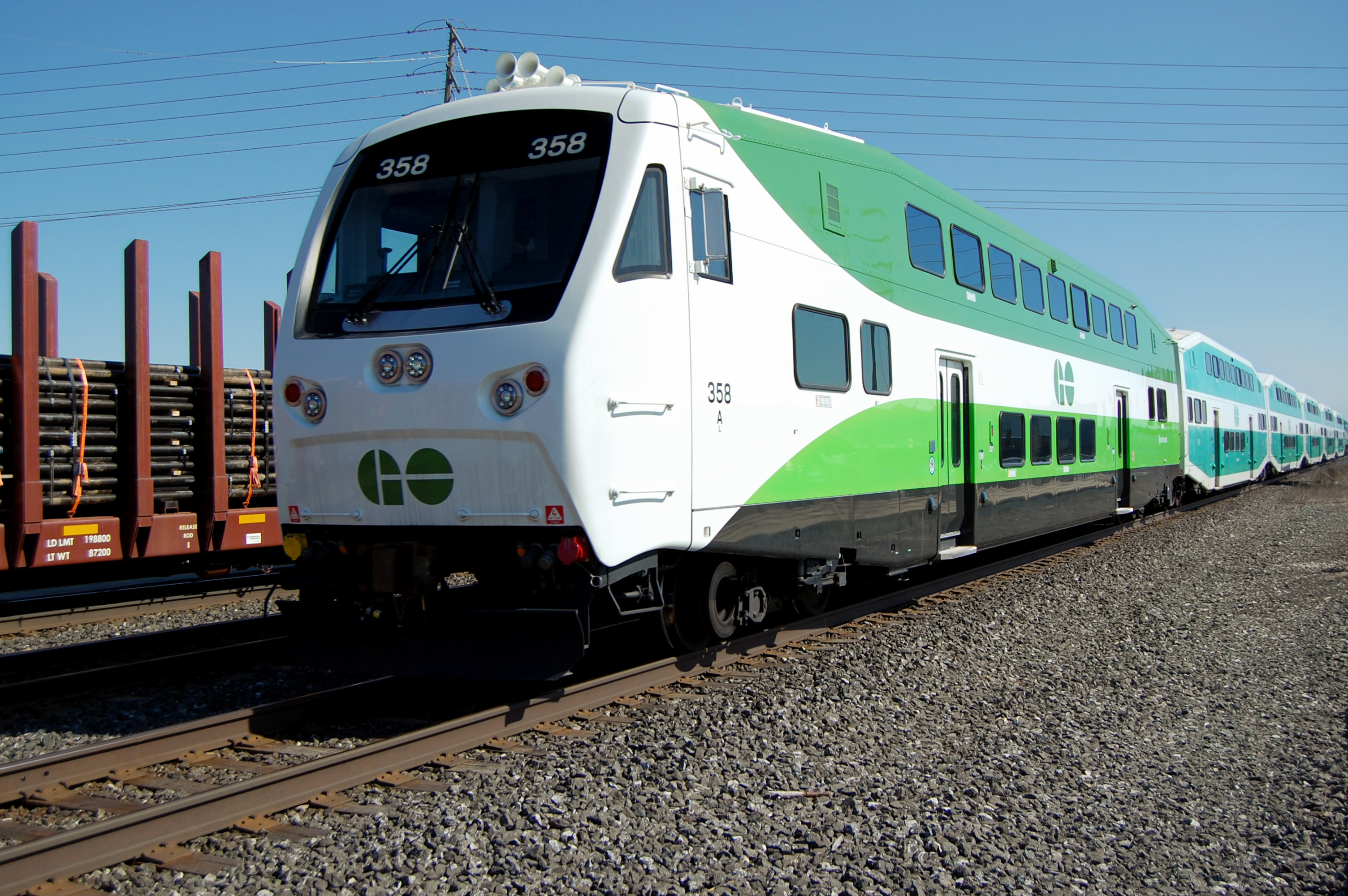
All GO Transit trains use Bombardier BiLevel coaches

Canada's national passenger railway company, Via Rail, does not currently operate any bilevel coaches in its fleet, apart from the dome cars used on some long-distance services. These coaches include two levels over part of the length of the vehicle.

The Ontario Northland Railway operates a bilevel dome car on its Polar Bear Express service with two levels along the entire length of the vehicle.

The Bombardier BiLevel Coach was originally designed by Hawker-Siddeley Canada for the GO Transit commuter rail network in southern Ontario. It is now used by 14 different railway operators across North America, including all three of Canada's commuter rail systems. All train services operated by GO Transit and West Coast Express use Bombardier BiLevel coaches, while Montreal's Exo trains use a mix of Bombardier Bilevel, Bombardier MultiLevel and various single-level coaches.

The private rail tour company Rocky Mountaineer uses bilevel full-length dome cars built by Colorado Railcar.

=== China ===
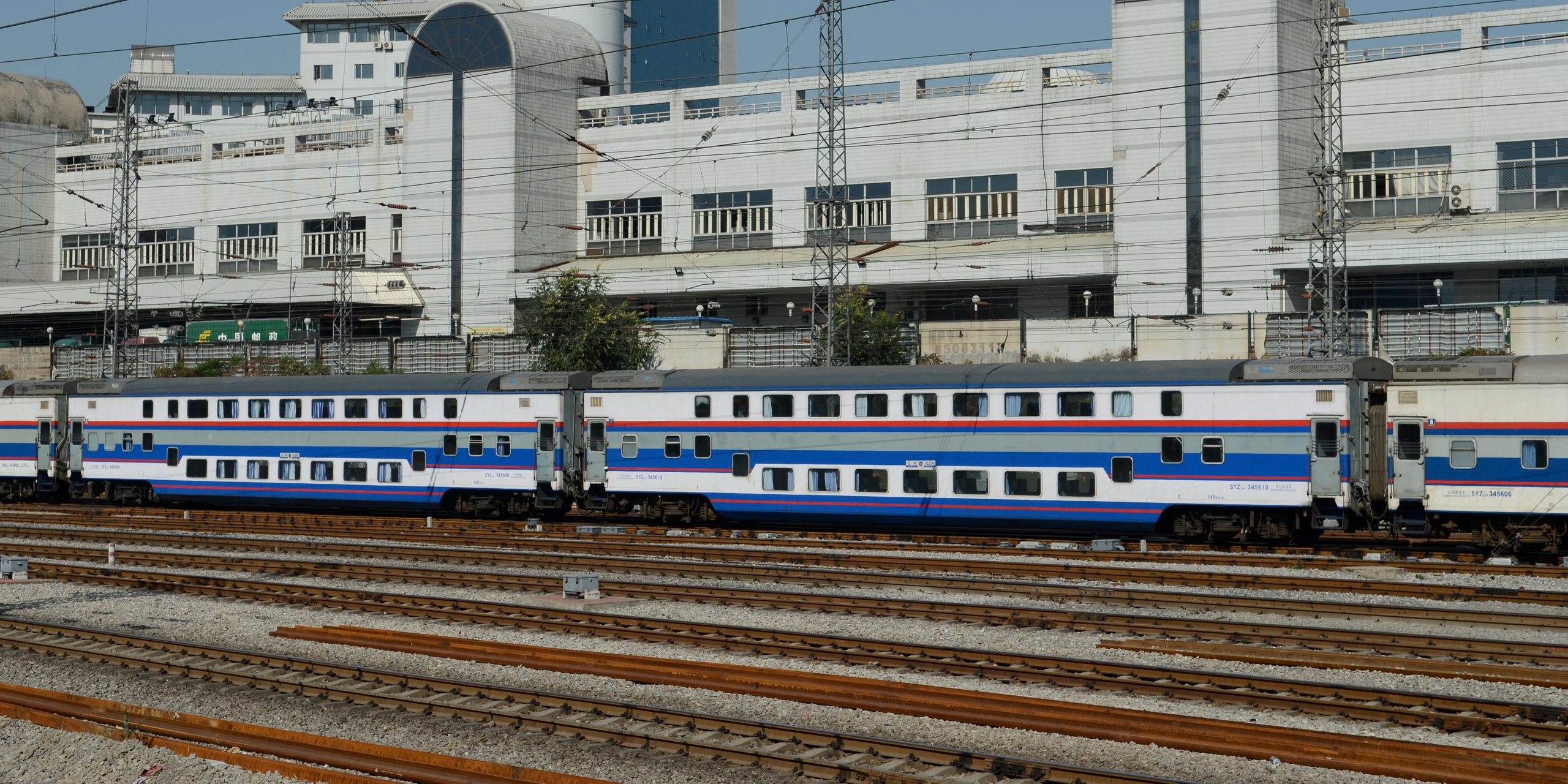
The SRZ1_{25K} double-decker car

The first bilevel train for China Railways was built by Sifang in 1958 as the Dongfeng diesel multiple unit, consisting of two diesel power cars and four bilevel coaches. After withdrawing Dongfeng DMU from use in 1982, China Railways redeveloped double-decker trains, the first of which rolled out from Nanjing Puzhen Rolling Stock Works in 1987 as locomotive-hauled coaches SYZ25 and SRZ25.

The carriage designations of bilevel cars in China start with "S", abbreviating "double-decker" (双层; shuāngcéng) in Chinese. Current models of double decker trains include the 25B series, 25Z series and 25K series. Most bilevel cars in China were built by Nanjing Puzhen Rolling Stock Works, while some bilevel coaches were built by Changchun Railway Vehicles. The types of bilevel cars including bilevel hard seat (SYZ), bilevel soft seat (SRZ), bilevel hard sleeper (SYW), bilevel soft sleeper (SRW), Bilevel dining car (SCA) and bilevel soft seat-baggage combine car (SRZXL).

Bilevel coaches are mainly used for regional services in China, like Kunming–Dali–Lijiang intercity trains in Yunnan and Shijiazhuang–Qinhuangdao express train in Hebei. Additionally, a cross-railway bureau double-deck train service is provided between Tianjin and Baoji (via Beijing West railway station).

=== Czech Republic ===
České dráhy operates 83 electric multiple units of Class 471 manufactured by Škoda Vagonka, which was a subsidiary of Škoda Transportation and locomotive-hauled trains which was also used on the non-electrified routes around Prague.

=== Denmark ===
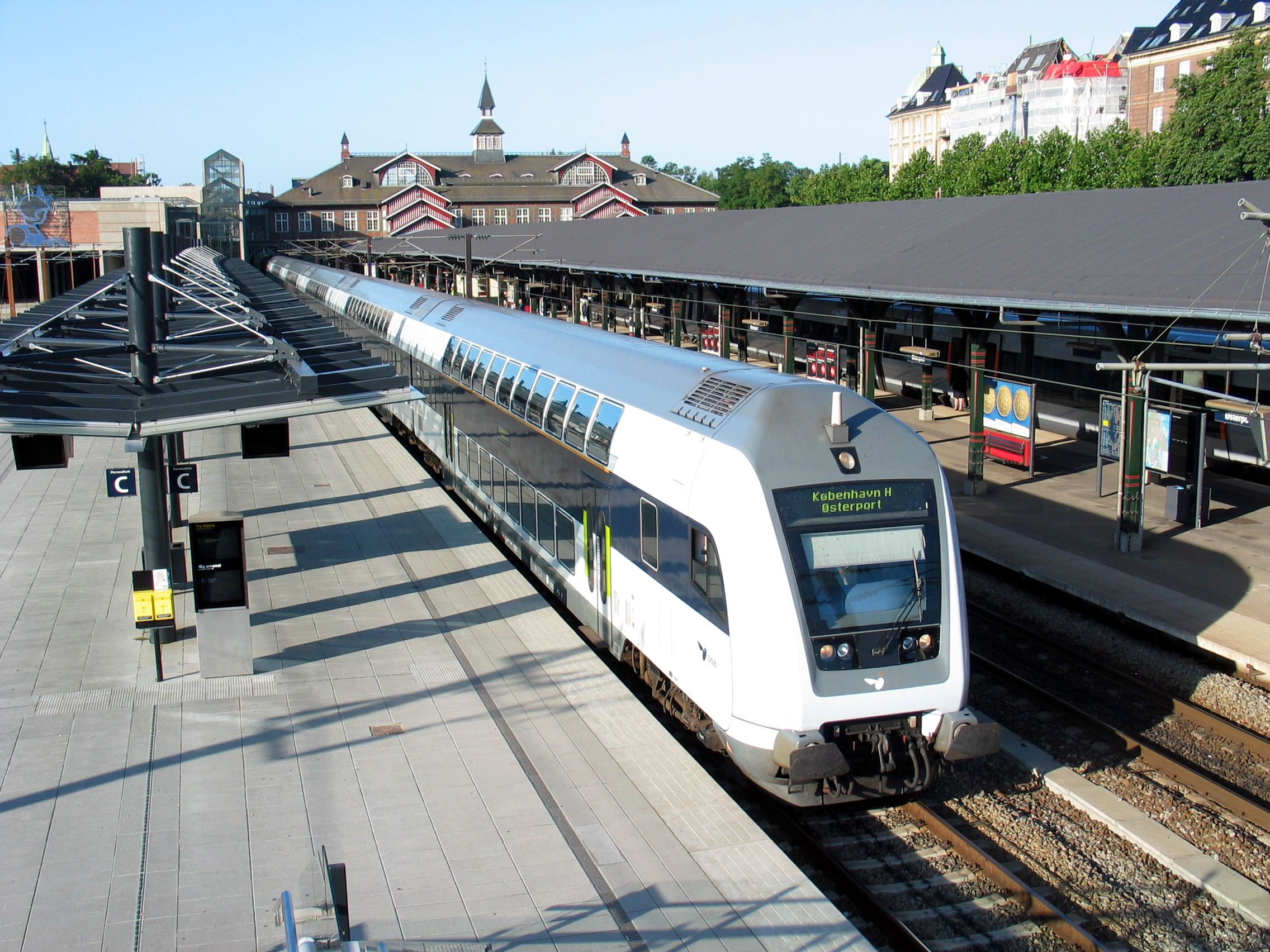
In use by Danske Statsbaner

In Denmark, DSB began running Bombardier Double-deck Coaches in 2002. The coaches are used on Regional services on Zealand.

=== Finland ===
In Finland, VR began operating double-deck day cars in 1998. They are Finnish-designed and manufactured by Transtech in Kajaani. Each car has two entrances on the lower level of the middle section, allowing level entry from station platforms at the modern Finnish standard height of 550 mm (21.7 in). The end sections of each car – and the inter-car connections – are at mid-level.

VR introduced its first double-deck sleeping cars on 1 February 2006. The two-bed cabins on the upper deck have toilets and showers while cabins on the lower deck use shared ones. Double-deck driving-trailers were introduced during late 2013 and restaurant cars in early 2014.

The double-deck cars are designed for running at higher speeds than ordinary passenger cars – up to 200 km/h (124 mph), although the upper limit was later reduced for trains entering tunnels. The cars are frequently operated in all-double-deck InterCity trains (known as IC^{2}) with at-seat power supply for laptops and wireless LAN internet connection.

=== France ===
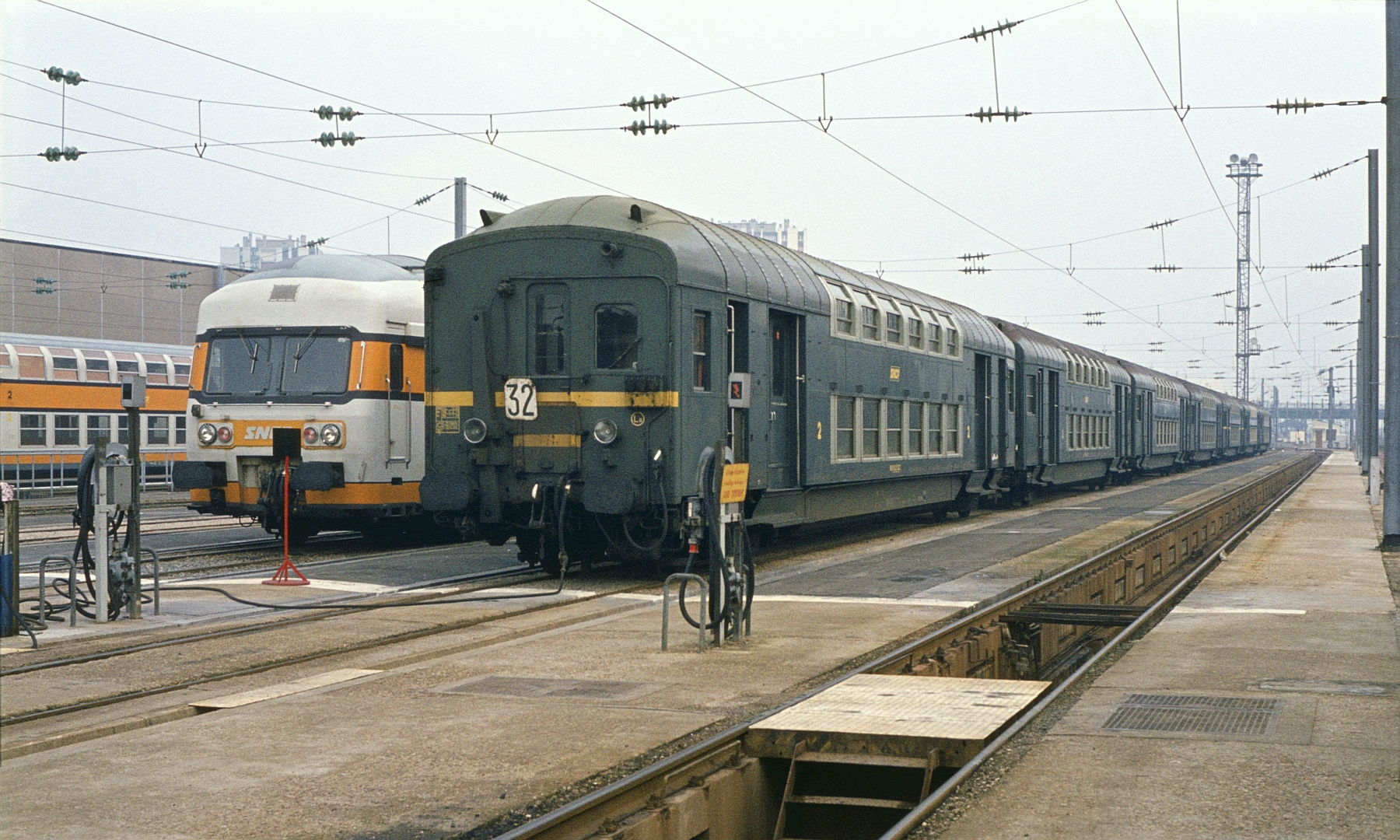
A rake of 1933 État coaches alongside newer VB2N

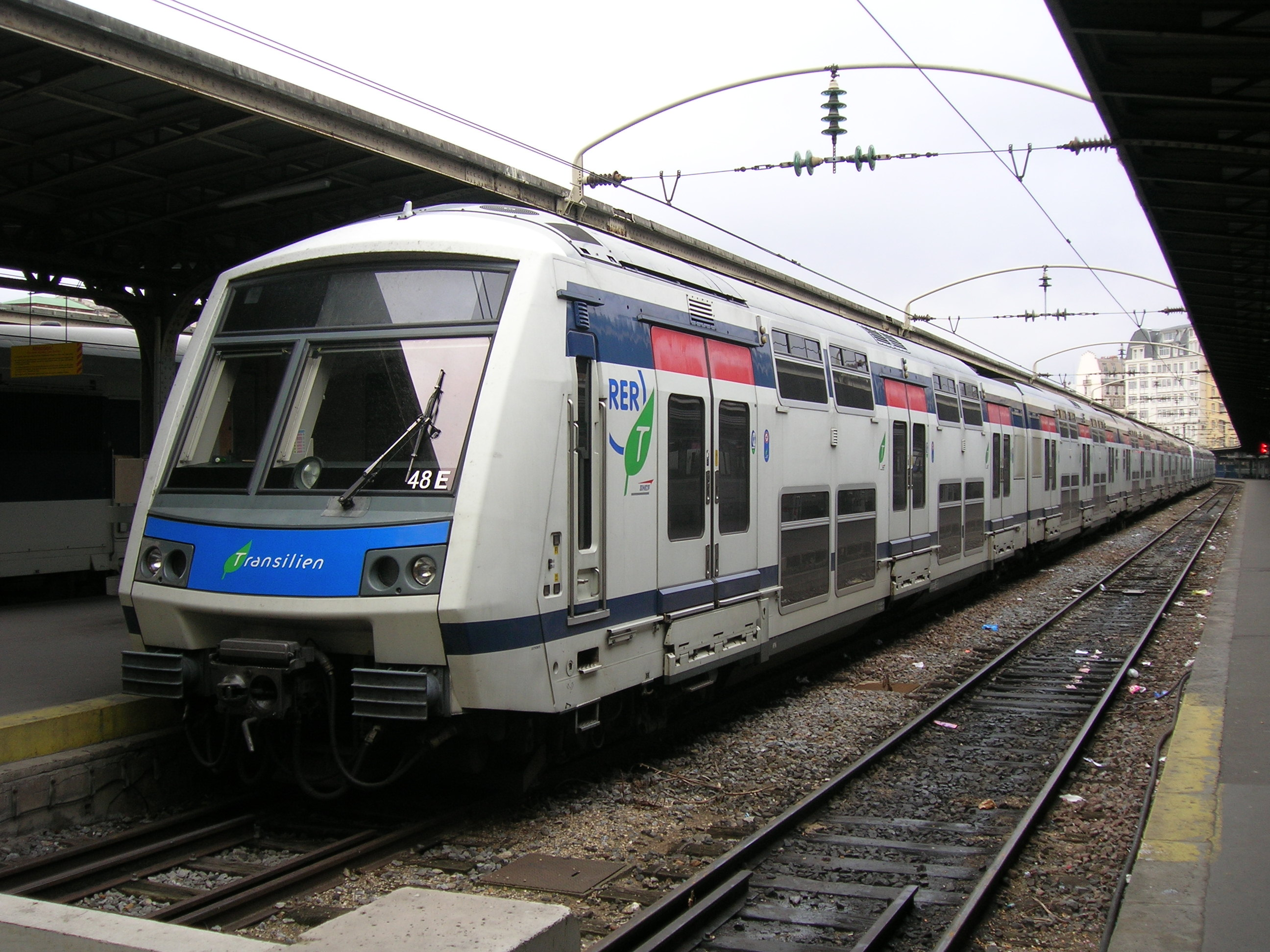
French suburban double-deck multiple unit

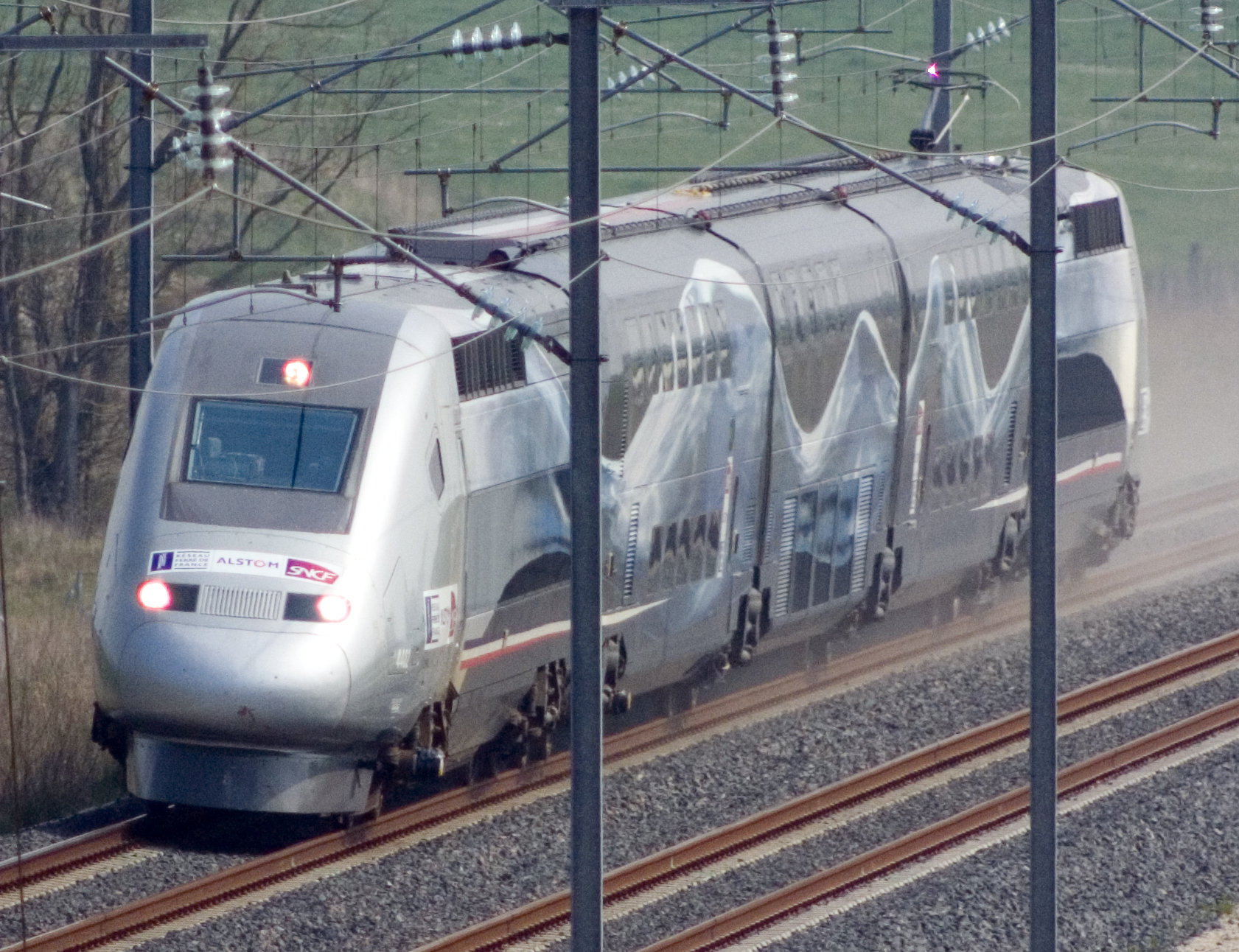
TGV 4402 (operation V150) reaching 574.8 km/h (357 mph)

The Chemins de fer de l'État in France ran voitures à 2 étages split level double-deck suburban coaches from 1933. Its successor, the SNCF, has been running VB2N double-decker coaches since 1975; VB2N were introduced from 1975 as a replacement of the État cars.

SNCF began running double-deck RER trains in 1982, followed by RATP in 1995. And since 1996, SNCF runs double-deck TGV cars on heavily used high-speed services, such as on the Paris-Lyon-Marseille line. Many suburban rail, regional rail and high-speed services are operated by double-deck DMUs, EMUs, coaches and TGV. The TGV Duplex are the fastest double-decker trains in the world with a commercial top speed of 320 km/h. Specially tuned trainset 4402 also holds the world speed record for conventional trains, reaching 574.8 km/h in 2007. The French loading gauge dictates that the double-deck cars have a maximum height of 4.32 m (14 ft 2 1/8 in).

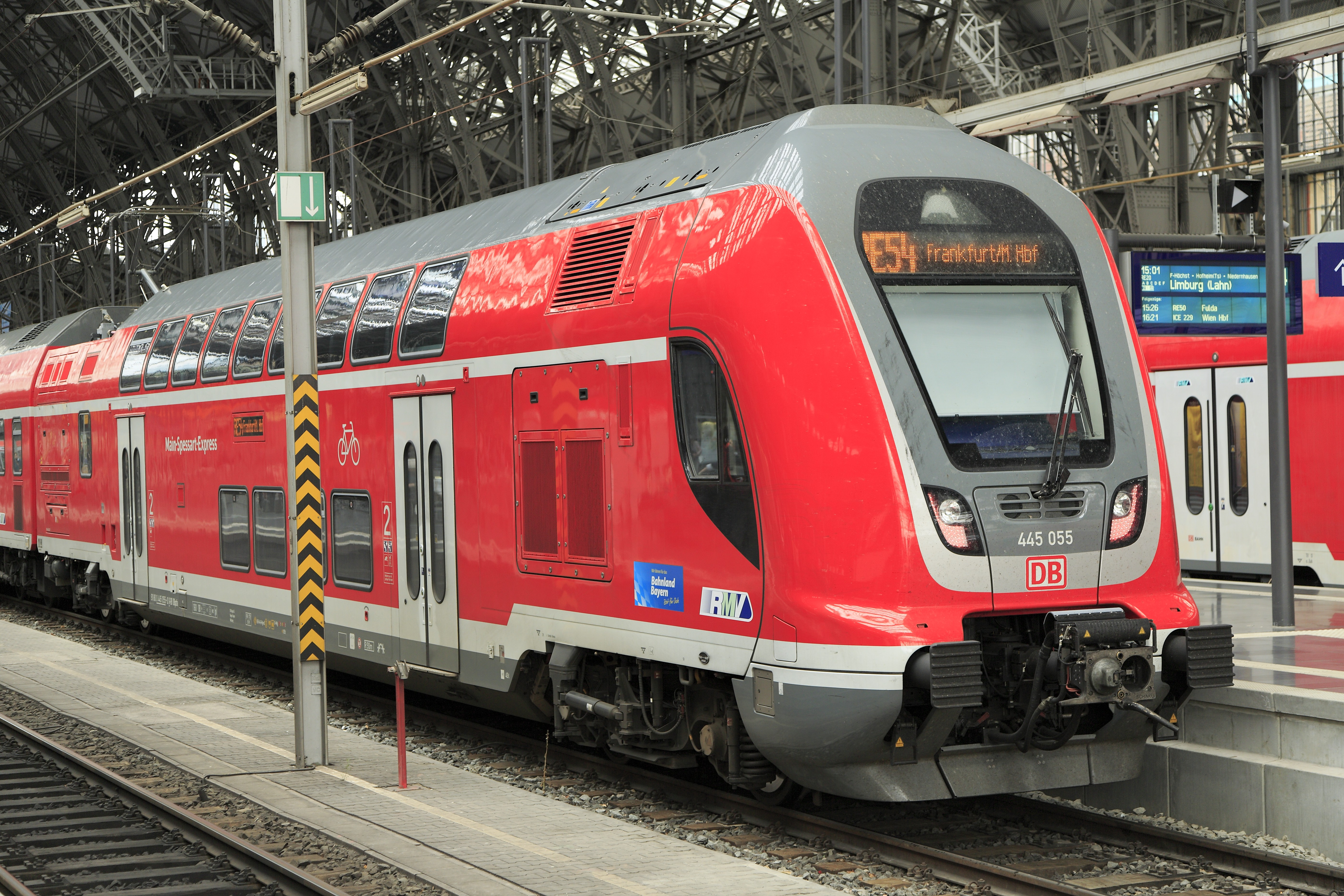
Doppelstocktriebwagen of the Deutsche Bahn

=== Germany ===
The East German railway company Deutsche Reichsbahn (DR) implemented the first bilevel cars in 1974 for interurban lines. After the revolutions in Eastern Europe, the German reunification the new founded national railway company Deutsche Bahn took over the DR bilevel cars and started to order high numbers of bilevel cars for regional and interurban traffic.

=== Hong Kong ===
MTRCL and formerly KCRC operate double-decker carriages with the KTT train sets on its cross-boundary route between Kowloon and Guangzhou. These cars were manufactured in Japan by Kinki Sharyo. The "Ktt" cars were used to serve between the Hung Hom and Lo Wu stations from January to May 1998, before the electrification of Guangzhou–Shenzhen railway. The "Ktt" cars have lower bottom floor than the ordinary single-deck cars serving on the same pair of tracks.

=== India ===
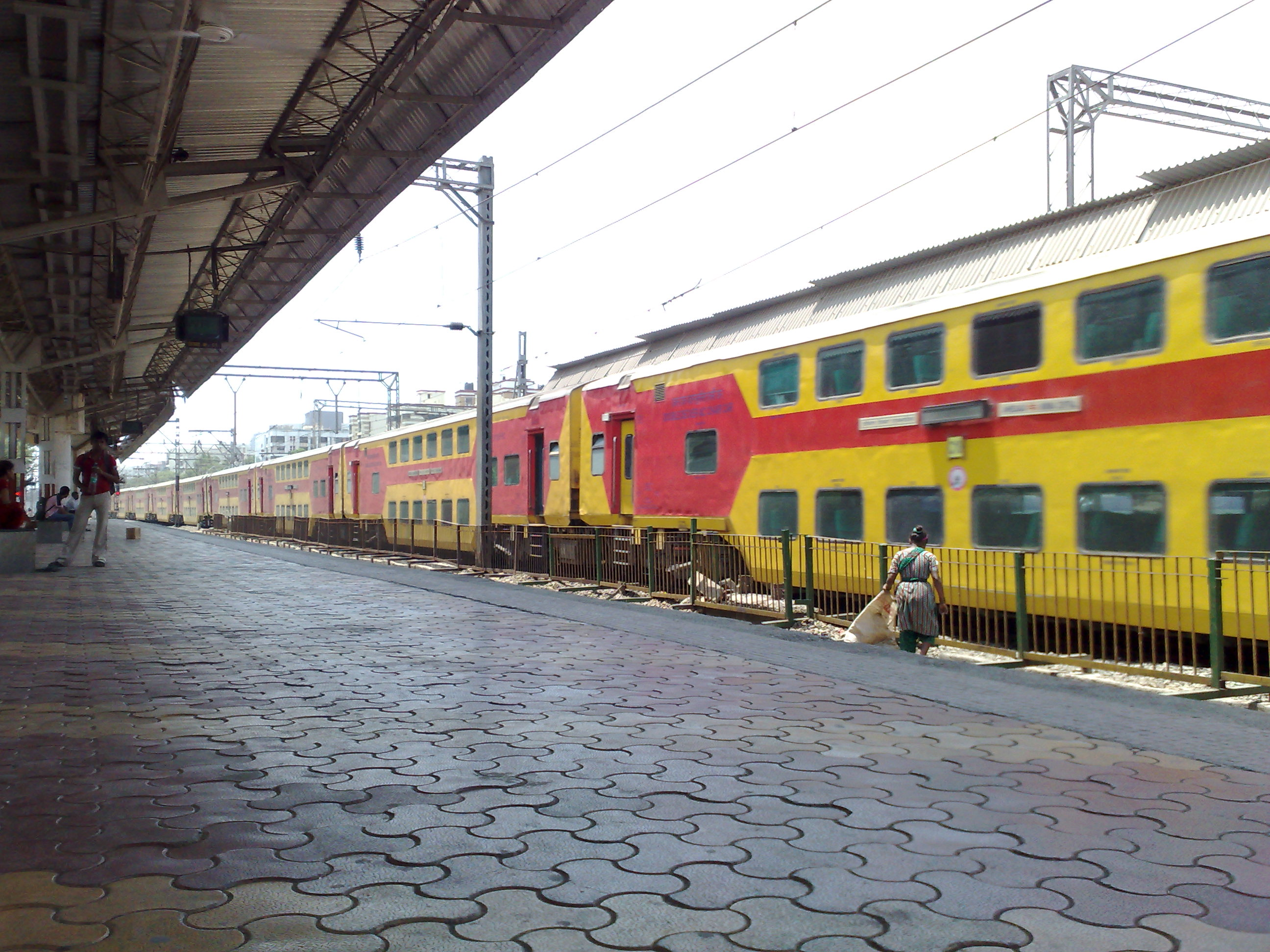
12931 Mumbai – Ahmedabad Double Decker at Borivali station

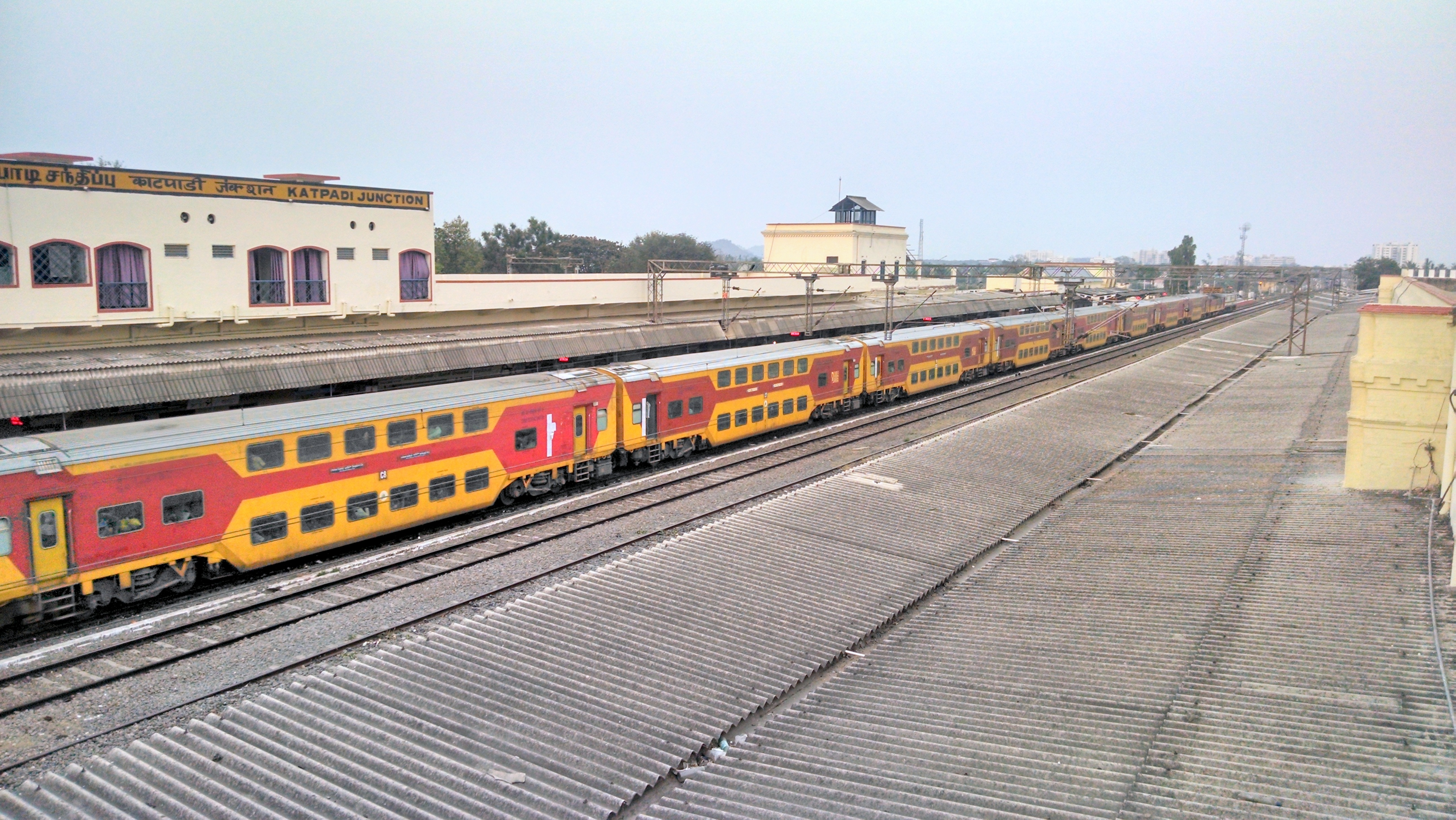
Chennai–Bangalore Double Decker Express

In India, the Sinhagad Express was the first train to operate with double-decker carriages, followed by other trains on the Mumbai-Pune route like the Deccan Queen and the Deccan Express, although double-decker service on these routes was later discontinued. In 1979, the Flying Ranee, a passenger train between Surat and Mumbai Central on the Western Railway became the first superfast train to use double-deck cars. The first air-conditioned double-decker service was introduced in 2011 on the Howrah–Dhanbad Double Decker Express between Howrah station in West Bengal and Dhanbad Junction in Jharkhand which was subsequently followed by Delhi Sarai Rohilla – Jaipur, Ahmedabad–Mumbai Central, Chennai Central – Bangalore, Anand Vihar (New Delhi) – Lucknow, Visakhapatnam–Vijayawada, Visakhapatnam–Tirupati and Mumbai Lokmanya Tilak Terminus – Madgaon double decker expresses.

=== Israel ===
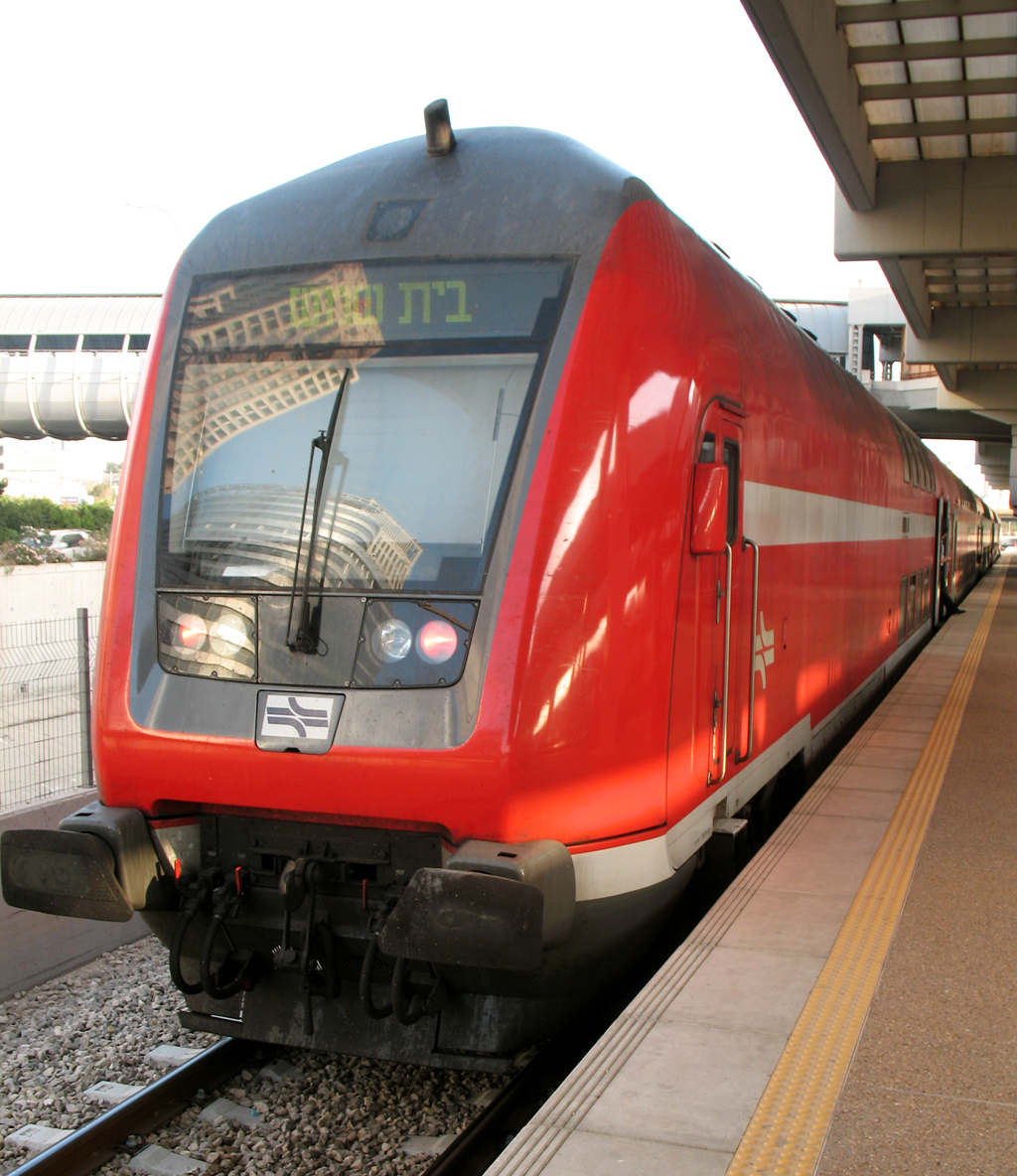
In use by Israel Railways

Israel Railways began running Bombardier Double-deck Coaches in 2001. The coaches were manufactured in Görlitz, Germany, and form the vast majority of its passenger fleet as of 2021.

Later, a Desiro HC by Siemens has been introduced to Israel Railways. Desiro HC has 2-floor coaches in the middle of the train, while the first and the last coaches are single-floor. The train operates mainly on the Herzlia–Jerusalem electrified line (via Tel Aviv) as of 2022.

=== Italy ===
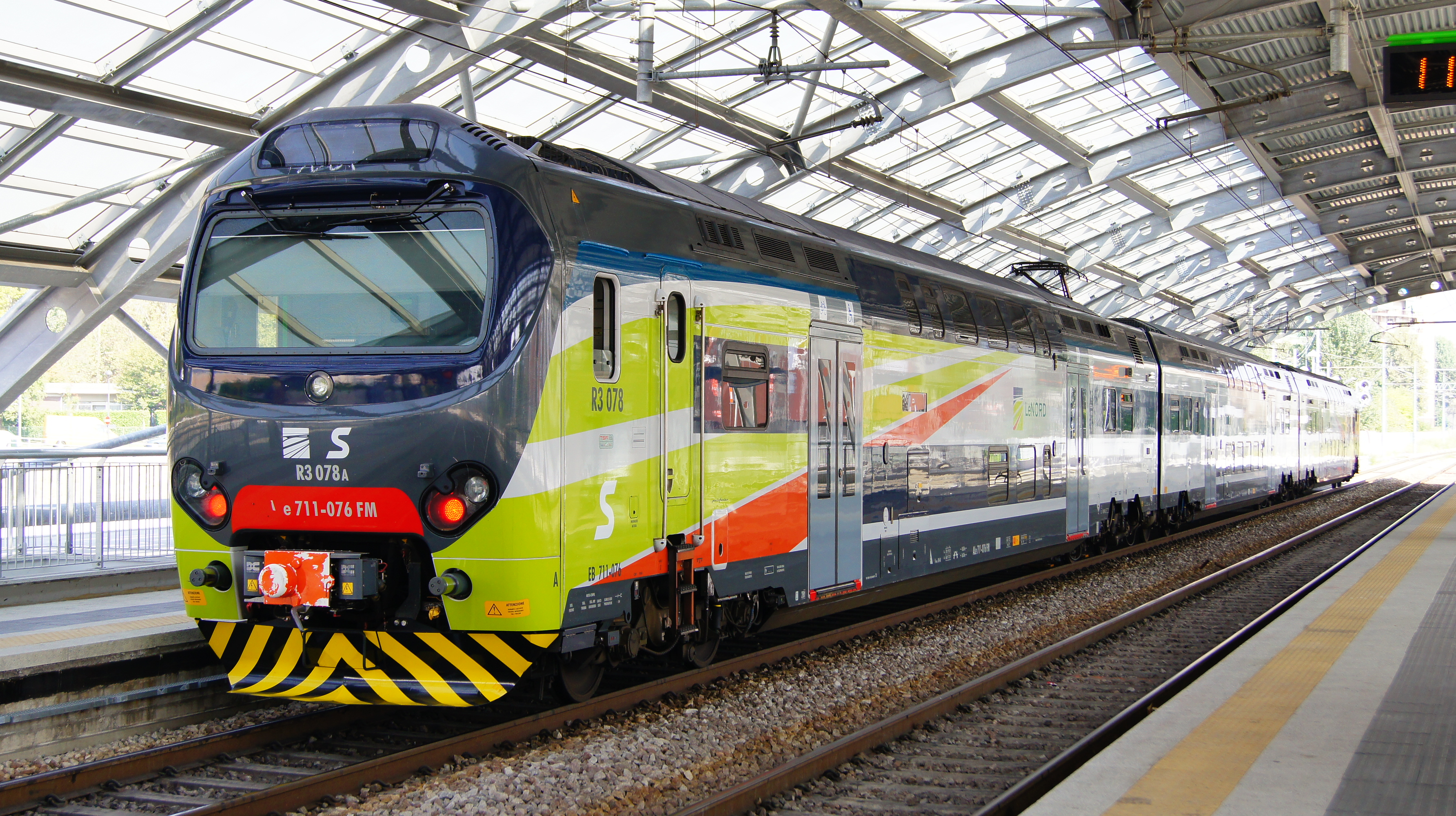
FNM bilevel train TSR at Milano Affori railway station

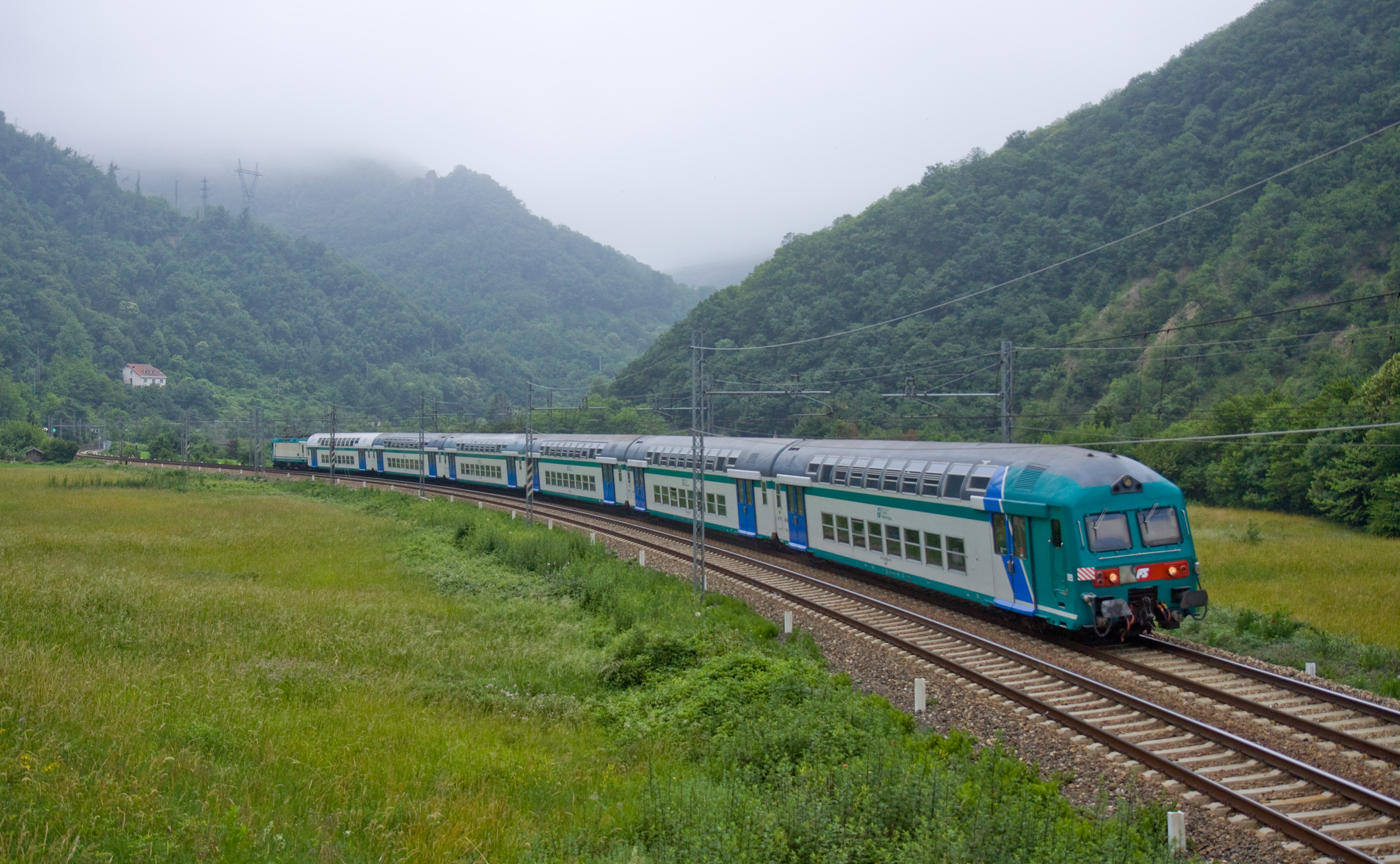
Trenitalia bilevel train with "Casaralta" Carrozza Due Piani coaches near Isola del Cantone

In the 1970s, with the rise of mass commuting to the big cities the Ferrovie dello Stato have found themselves having to quickly increase the capacity of their services with Carrozze Due Piani Tipo 1979 based on French VB2N (see it:Carrozza Due Piani). Today, double-decker coaches are also operated by two private railway companies, Ferrovie Nord Milano and Ferrovie del Sud Est. The types of double-decker train operating in Italy are Rock (Caravaggio), Vivalto, TAF, and TSR.

=== Japan ===
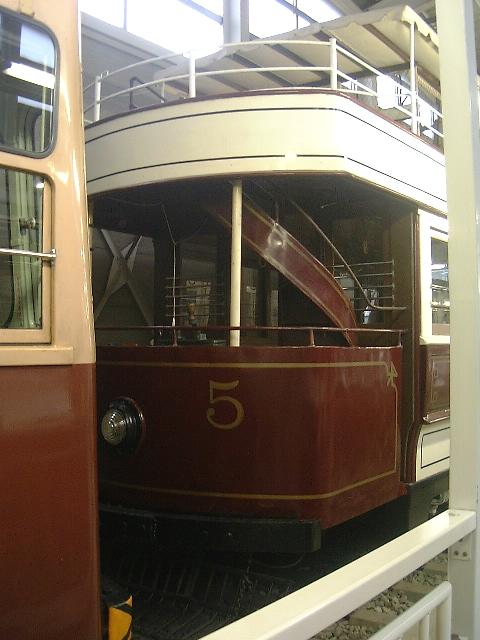
Osaka City Tram Type 5

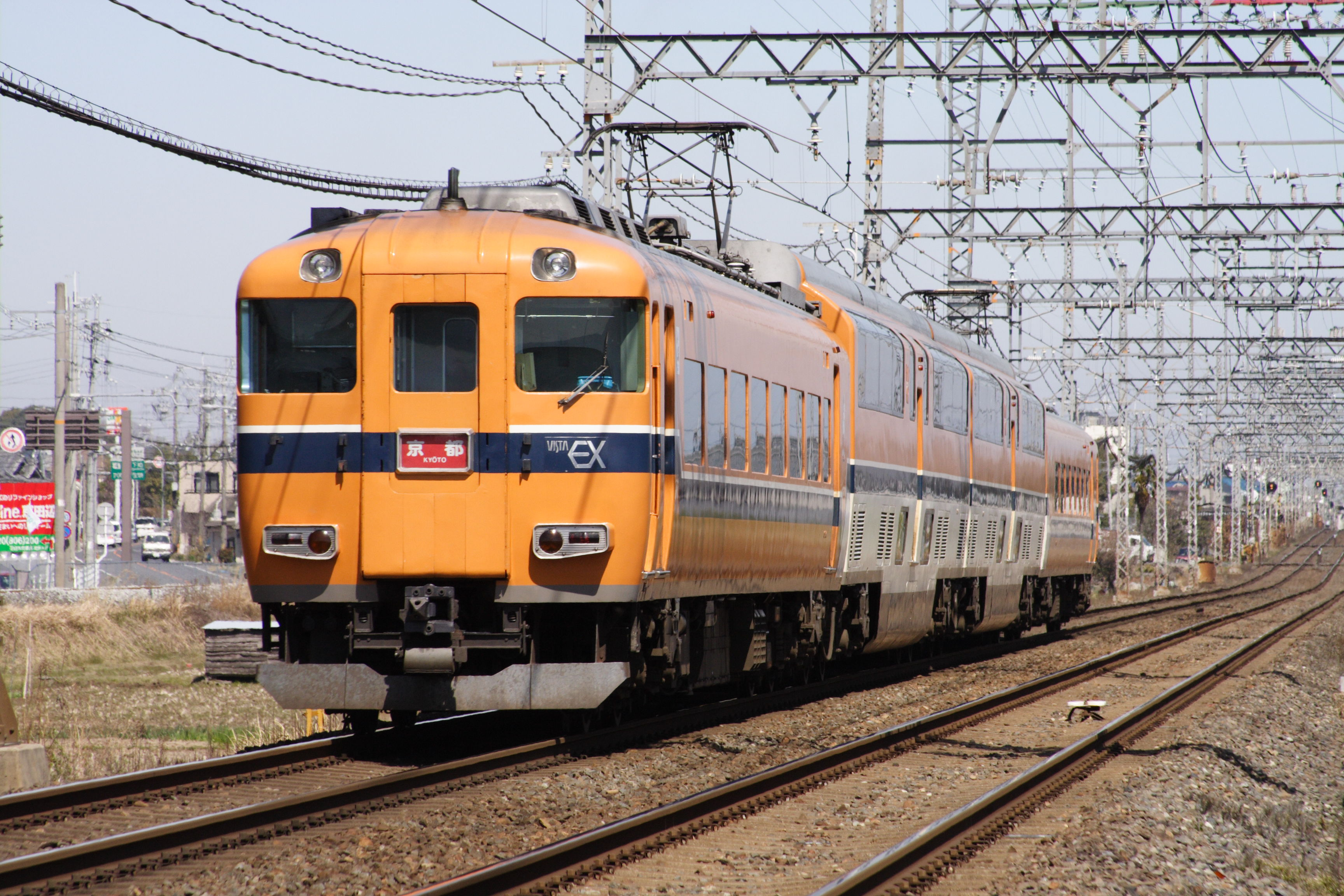
Kintetsu 30000 series Vista Car introduced in 1978

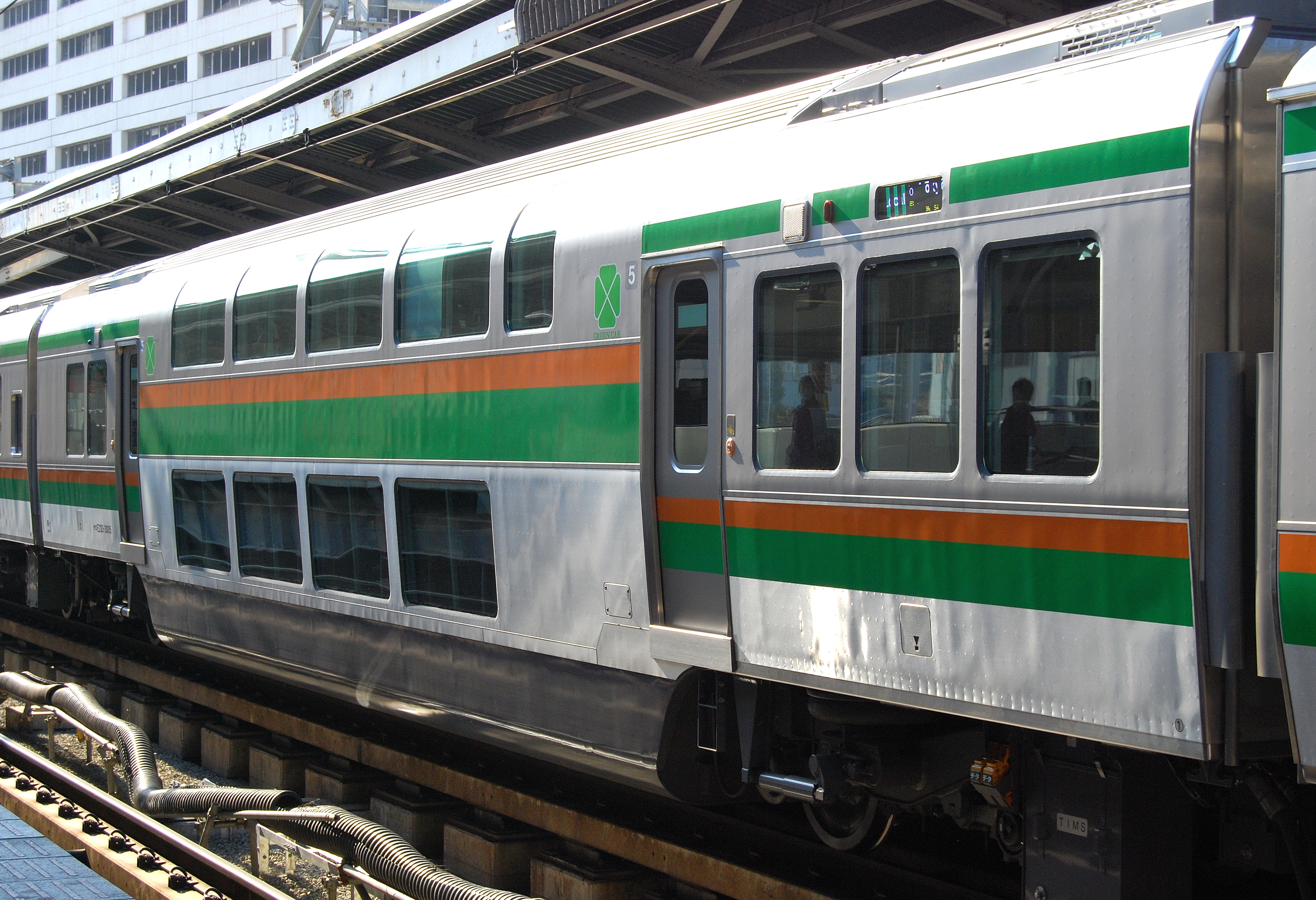
JR East E233-3000 series bilevel Green Car

In Japan, double-decker trains are used either to show better scenery, or to increase seat capacity. In Tokyo area commuter trains, double-decker cars are generally used as Green Cars, the cars with better accommodations than the regular commuter cars.

The first Japanese double-decker train appeared in 1904. It was Type 5 train of Osaka City Tram. The Kintetsu Railway 20100 Series EMUs were built in 1962 and designed for school excursion. Sightseeing trains that feature double-decker carriages include the JR Shikoku 5000 series, Keihan 8000 series, JR Central 371 series, and Odakyu 20000 series RSE. The first JNR/JR double-decker trains were 200 series Shinkansen and 100 series Shinkansen, for Shinkansen lines.

JR East introduced the 215 series double-deck EMUs for Home Liner services in 1992. JR East also introduced E1 Series Shinkansen and E4 Series Shinkansen for its Shinkansen Lines; the trains are doubled decked to increase their capacities. This includes JR West 285 series EMUs for Sunrise Izumo/Sunrise Seto and JR East E26 series cars for Cassiopeia services.

=== Russia ===
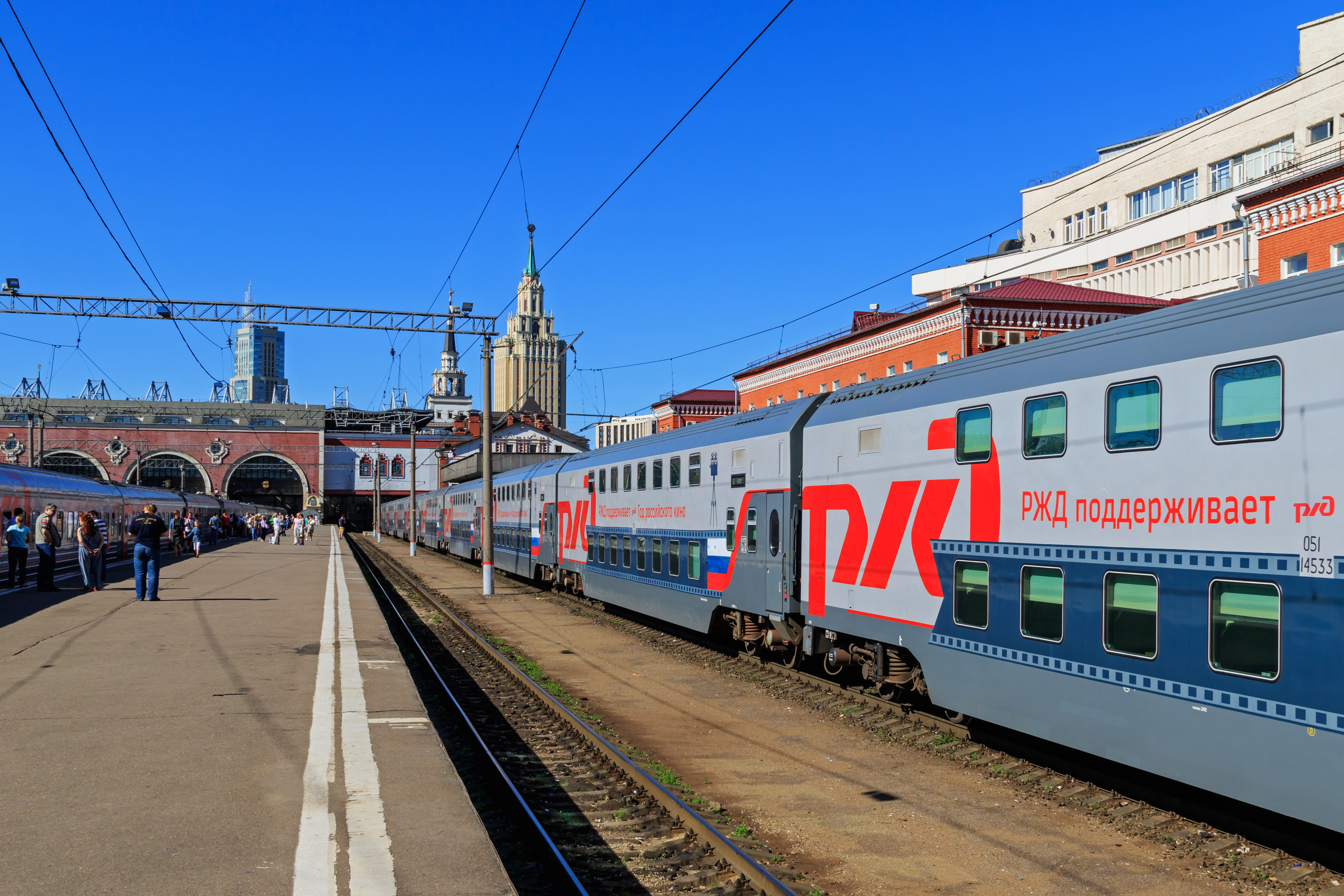
TVZ double-decker train

In 2012, a prototype double-decker rail carriage was made at the TVZ Tver Carriage Building Factory for the RZD Russian Railways company. This prototype carriage is a sleeping car with four-berth compartments and a total capacity of 64 passengers.

Russian Railways ordered double-decker sleeper carriages from Transmashholding for the Adler-Moscow train service. As of August 2012 they were expected to be delivered in time for the 2014 winter Olympics in Sochi. RZD offers low platforms for Moscow-Adler route.

Train number	Route	Start date	Class	Pairs of trains per day
No. 103/104	Adler–Moscow	30 October 2013	Coupe, Sv	1
No. 5/6, No. 7/8	St. Petersburg – Moscow	1 February 2015, 1 Feb 2016	Coupe	2
No. 23/24	Moscow–Kazan	1 June 2015	Coupe, SV	1
No. 45/46, No. 69/70 (summer 2016)	Moscow–Voronezh	31 July 2015	Sessile	1 (2 from summer 2016)
No. 49/50	Moscow–Samara	3 December 2015[13]	Coupe, SV	1
No. 35/36	St. Petersburg – Adler	See below?	?	?

Date	Event	Route	Details
28 May 2016	Departed	Adler for St. Petersburg	Seventh double-decker train
2 August 2017	Departed	Kislovodsk for Moscow	Eighth double-decker train
14 September 2017	Departed	Rostov-on-Don for Adler	Ninth double-decker
9 December 2018	Deparetd	Izhevsk for Moscow	Tenth double-decker train
3 December 2019	Updated	Petrozavodsk–Moscow–Petrozavodsk	Karelia branded train
9 December 2019	Updated	Penza–Moscow–Penza	Sura branded train
25 December 2019	Received	Moscow–Simferopol	No. 28 "Tavria"
25 December 2019	Updated	Moscow–Bryansk	No. 737-742
12 October 2020	Updated	Murmansk – Saint Petersburg	No. 21/22
16 October 2020	Received	Moscow–Smolensk	No. 743/744

On 27 October 2017, Aeroexpress began operating ESH2 motor-car (locomotive-less) high-speed double-decker trains developed by the Swiss company Stadler on the routes Moscow – Domodedovo Airport and Moscow – Vnukovo Airport. From November 2019, the trains were transferred to the Odintsovo – Sheremetyevo Airport route (Odintsovo – Belorussky railway Station in the MDC mode).

=== Slovakia ===
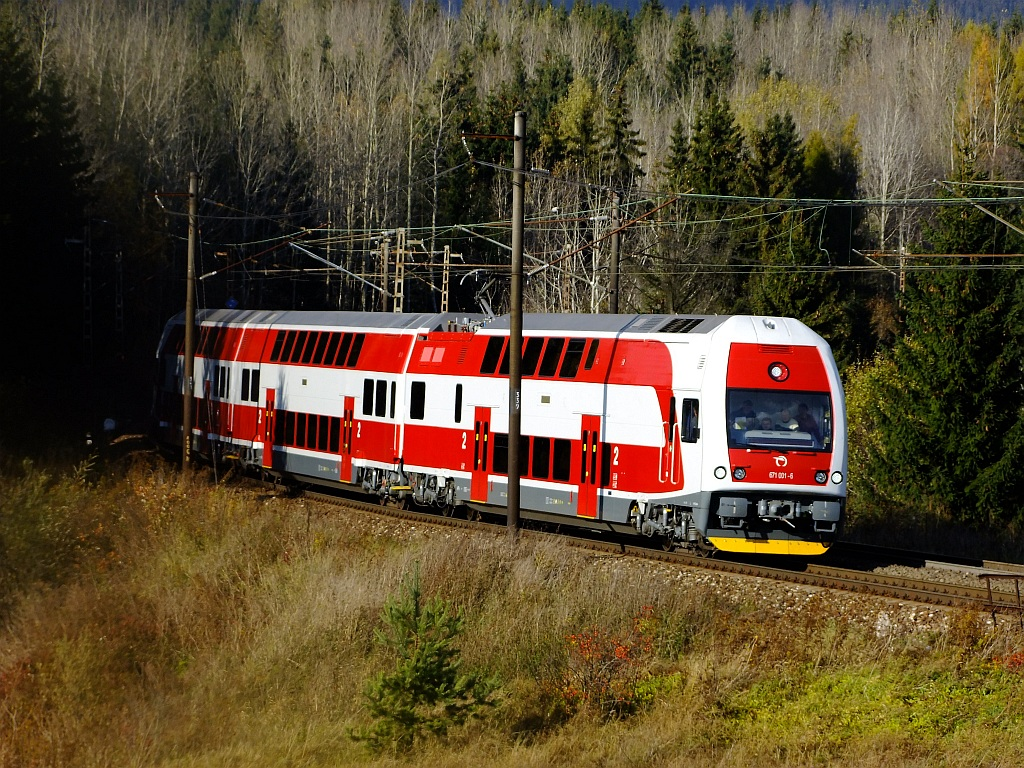
ZSSK Class 671

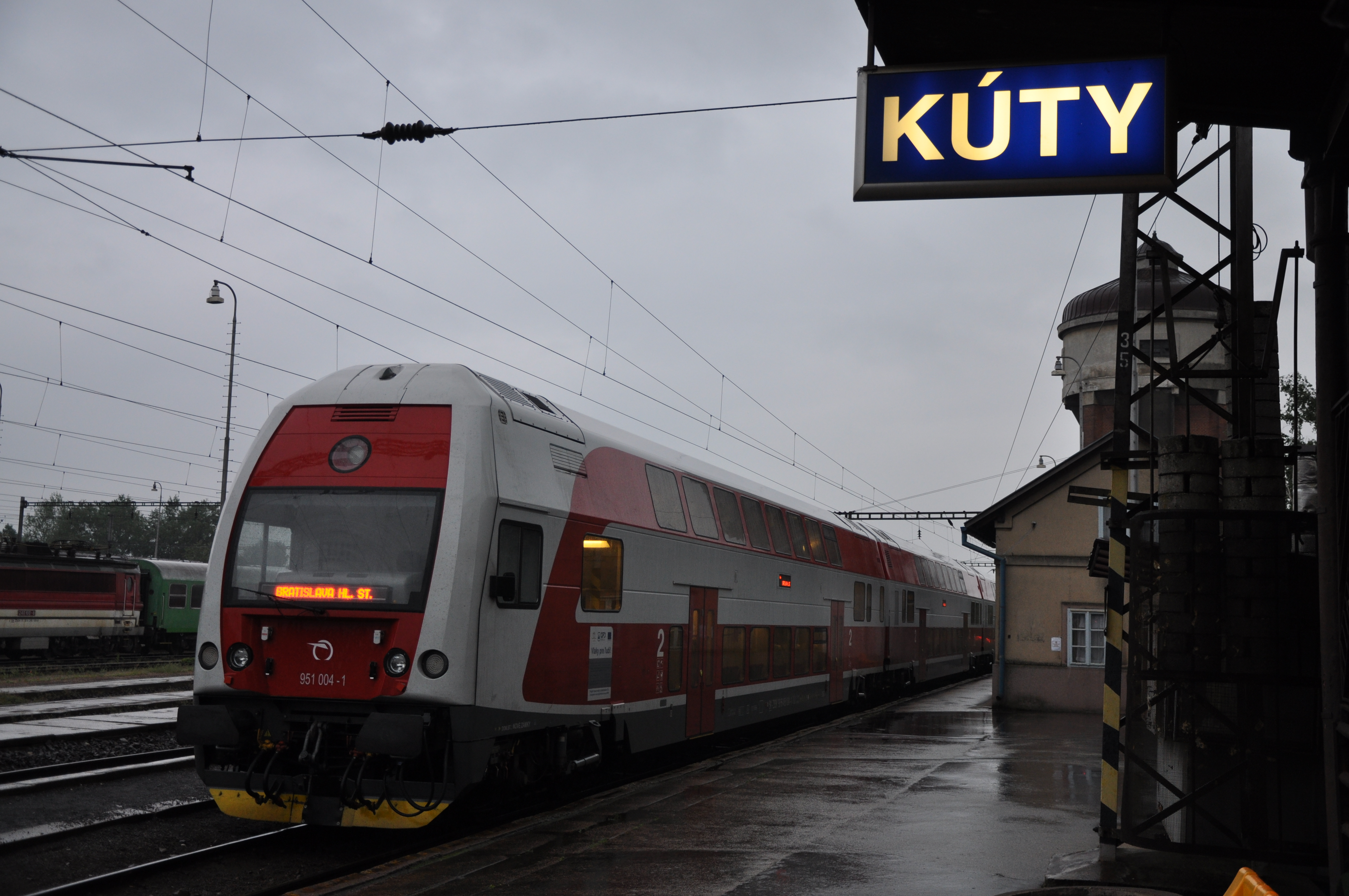
ZSSK Class 951

ZSSK operates 19 electric multiple units of Class 671 and 10 push-pull units of Class 951 manufactured by Škoda Transportation.

These trains mostly operate services between Žilina and Košice (Žilina – Trenčín, Žilina – Košice, Košice – Prešov and some others) and around Bratislava (between Kúty and Trnava).

As of 2016 some of units 951, usually with locomotive of class 350 (Škoda 55E), are used at international train service on Bratislava (SK) – Břeclav (CZ) main line.

=== Spain ===
Since 2021 the Bi-Level SNCF High Speed Trains “Ouigo España” operates. There are also some double-decker commuter trains (Class 450) nicknamed Vessels.

=== Sweden ===
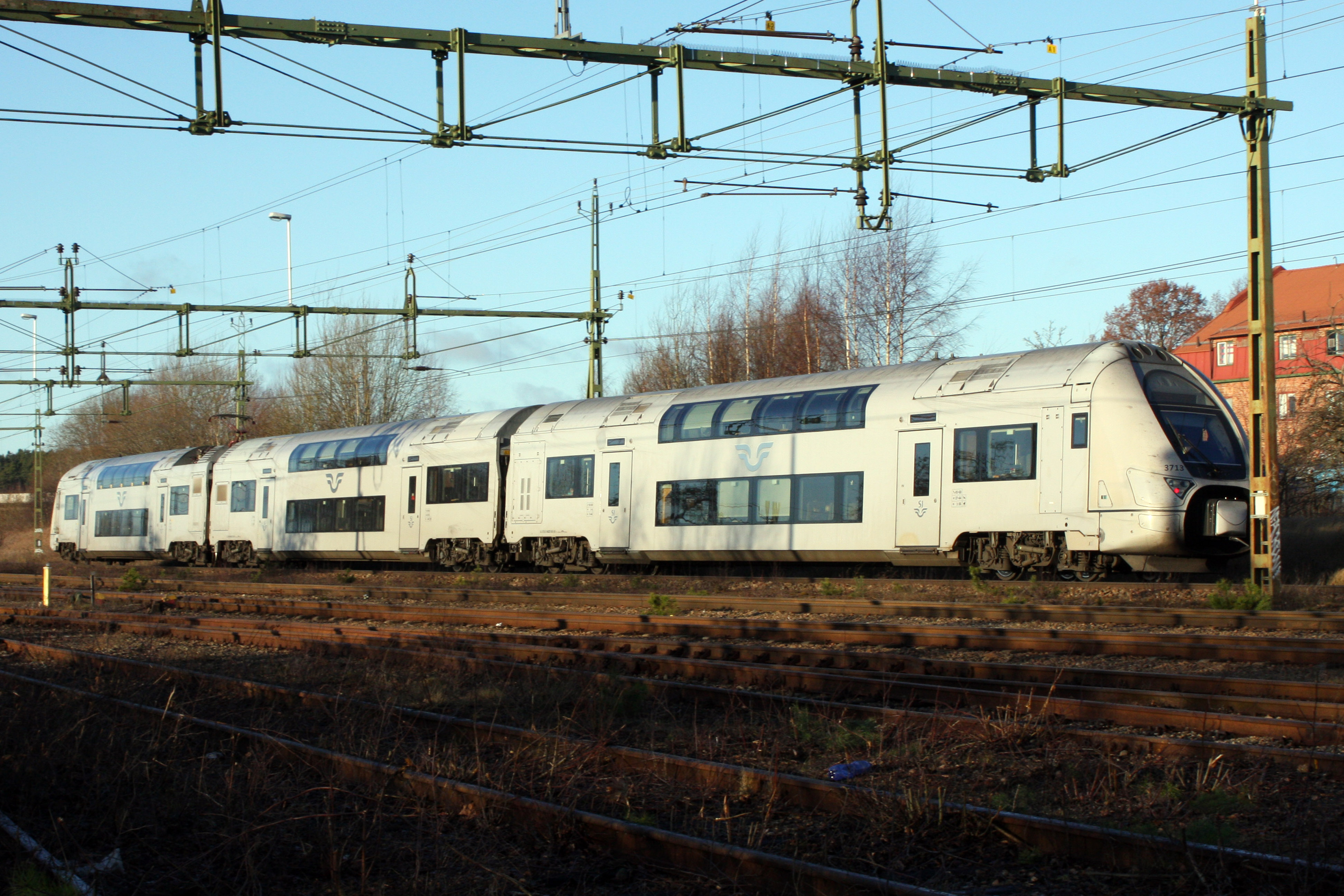
X40 operated by SJ AB

SJ AB operates 43 double-decker EMUs built by Alstom and designated class X40. The EMU comes in a two-coach version and a three-coach version. The trains are mainly used in regional trains in the areas around lake Mälaren and in the trains between Gävle and Linköping. It has a maximum speed of 200 km/h (125 mph) and is equipped with wireless internet.

From 2019 onwards, the bilevel Stadler KISS (known as DOSTO in Sweden) has also been used in the Mälardalen and Uppsala regions of Sweden, and since 2023, Tåg i Bergslagen has operated the same train sets in the Bergslagen region.

Between 1966 and 1990, SJ used DMUs of class Y3 with double-decker end cars and normal cars in between. Due to the distinct humps on the endcars, it was nicknamed "the camel".

=== Switzerland ===
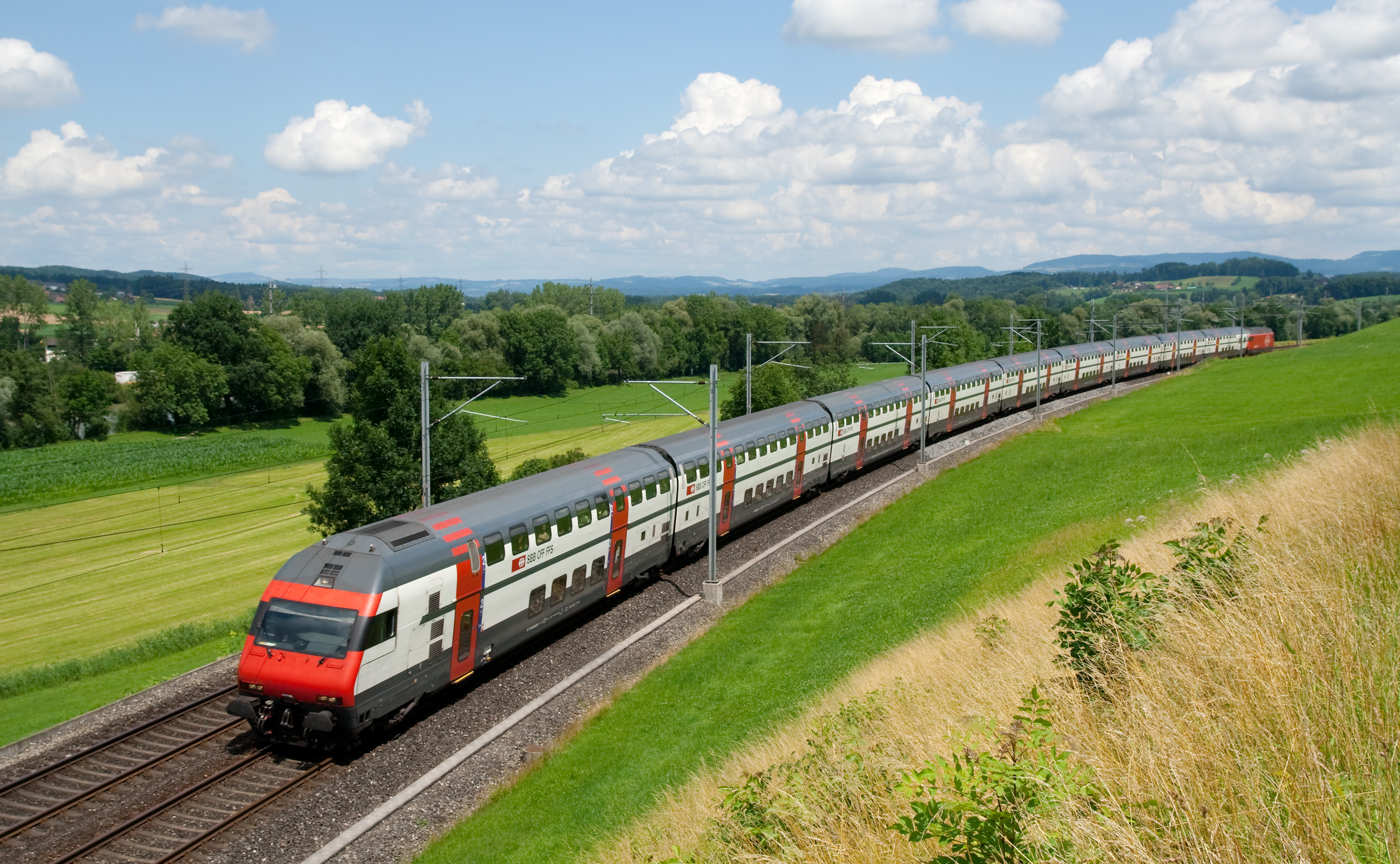
IC 2000 between Zürich and Luzern with the control car leading the train

Double-decker commuter trains are used by the Zürich S-Bahn. Three types of trains are used, an older type consisting of an electric locomotive with double-decker cars, and Electric Multiple Units where the motors are on board the car. From 2010 onwards, a third type – the Stadler KISS – has entered service.

The Swiss Federal Railways also operate the IC 2000 double-decker passenger coaches in most of Switzerland for high speed InterCity and InterRegio services. After massive delays, they are introducing the Bombardier TWINDEXX from 2019 on.

Both these high speed trains feature passages on the upper level only, which makes them incompatible with single level coaches, IC2000 are however still used in combination with single level coaches during rush hours.

=== Ukraine ===
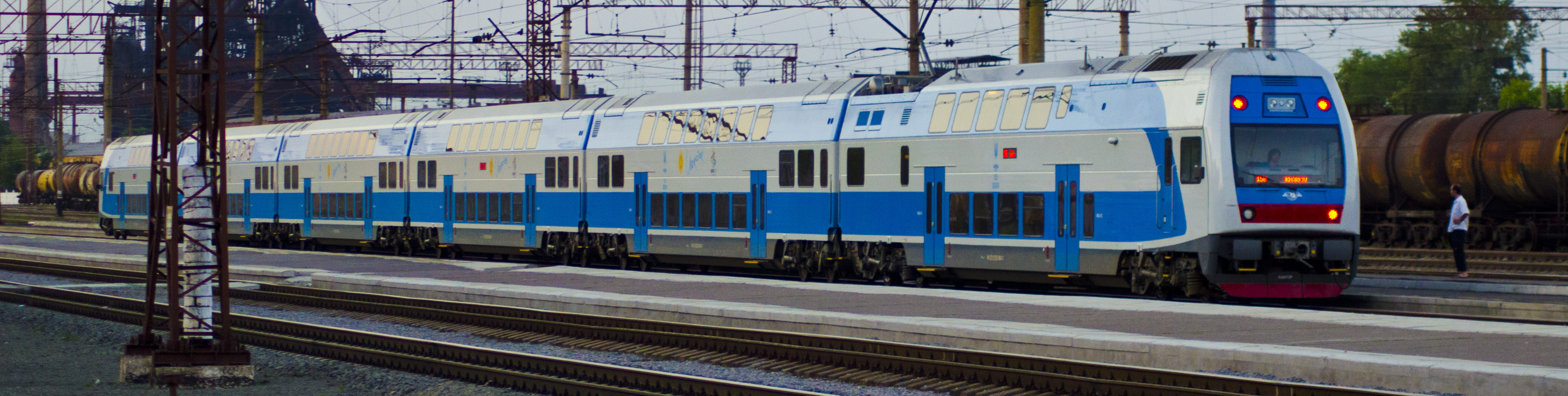
One of two EJ675 EMUs operated by Ukrainian Railways

In 2012, as part of preparation for UEFA Euro 2012, Ukrainian Railways bought two EJ675 EMUs manufactured by Škoda Transportation. These trains are used on inter-regional services. They were discontinued for modernization and redesigning in 2019. The two units were brought back to service in 2022 and currently run on the Kyiv–Lutsk line.

=== United Kingdom ===
In the United Kingdom, due to the small loading gauge, the railway system cannot easily accommodate double-deck trains. A modest attempt at double decking was made in 1948 on the Southern Railway with the two trains of the Bulleid 4DD class. Although innovative, with stepped compartments where the bottoms of the upper seats are above the heads of the people on the lower level but the feet of the people above are not, the loading gauge severely restricted their use and they were removed from service in 1971. Research by DCA concluded that double-decker trains were practical within the UK loading gauge and proposed a design for Crossrail in 2006, however the design was not taken forwards.

Double-decker trams, taller than the railway loading gauge, were common in British cities. When trams were replaced between the 1930s–1960s, their replacement would be double-decker buses.

=== United States ===
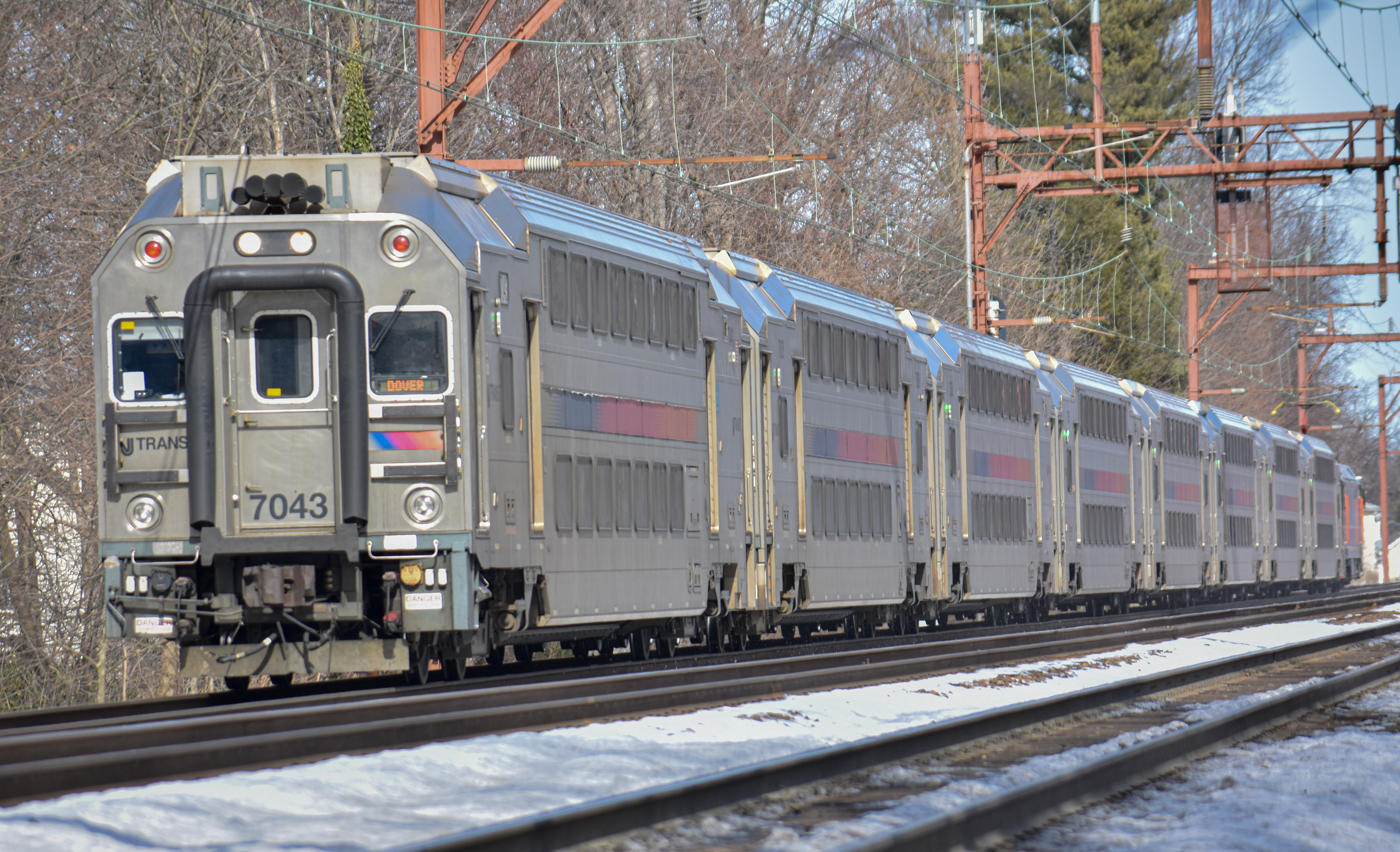
Bi-level New Jersey Transit train led by a cab car with quarter-point and end doors. Note how the cab car makes the train less aerodynamic in push operation.

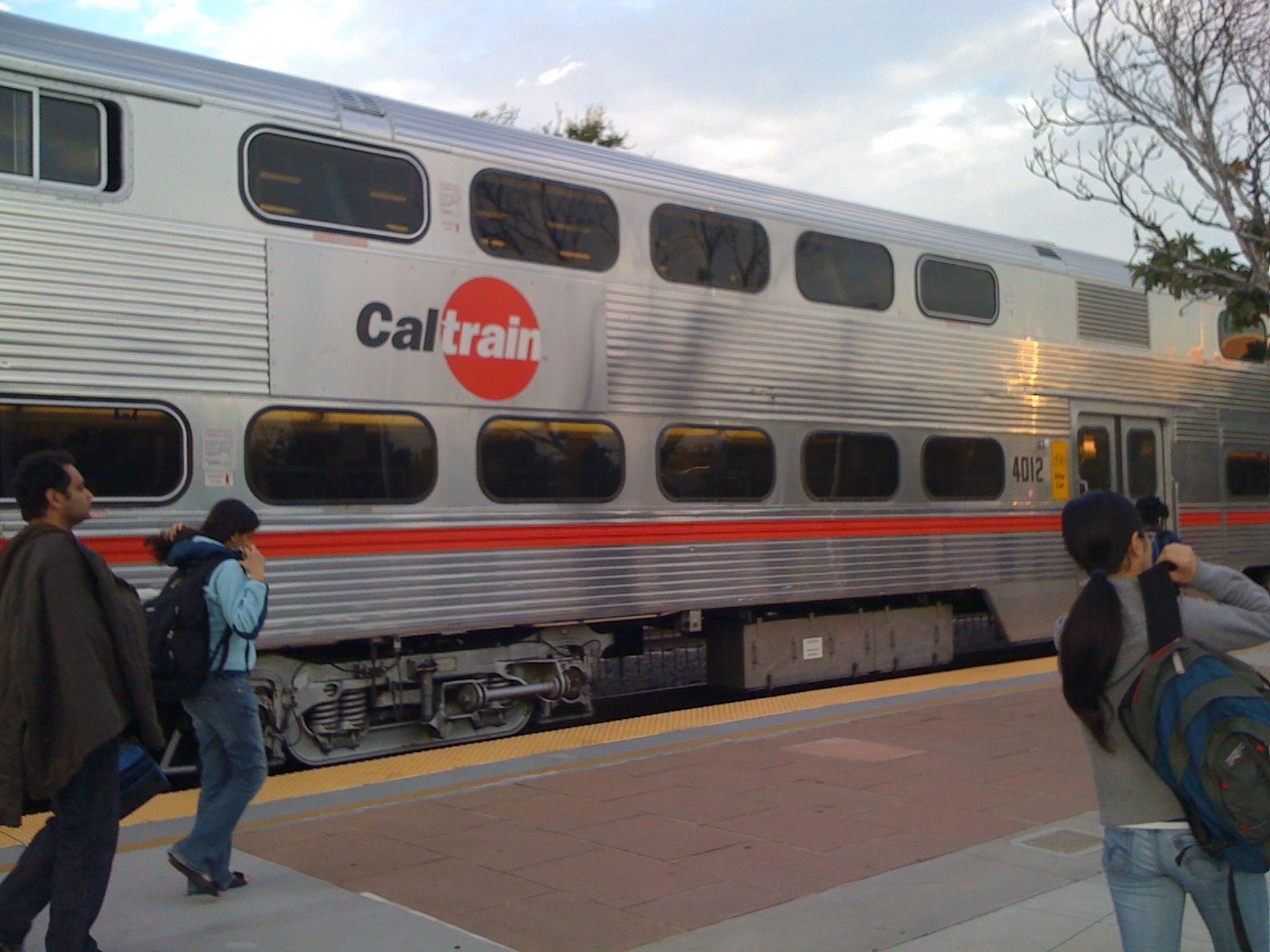
Nippon Sharyo gallery car used on Caltrain service

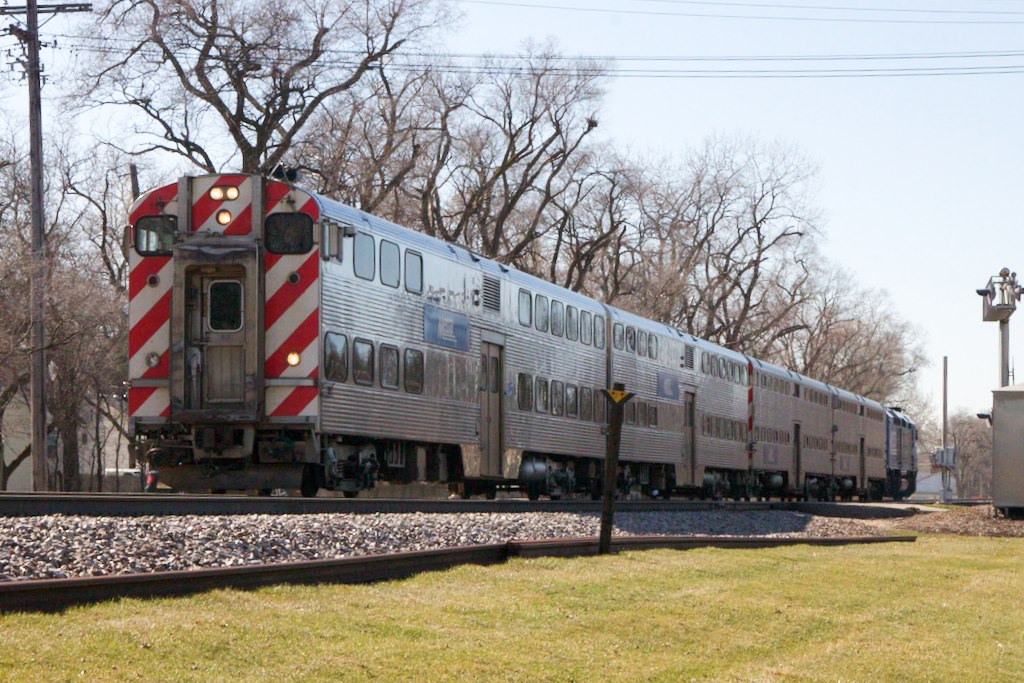
Nippon Sharyo Gallery Cab car used on Metra service leading an Amerail coach and two Budd cabs ahead of the locomotive

Bilevel passenger rail cars used in the United States are manufactured by Bombardier (now Alstom), Kawasaki, Colorado Railcar (today US Railcar), and several others, with the former two having produced the majority of the high platform "split level" commuter rail cars in use in the northeastern states.

Colorado Railcar produced bilevel DMUs and Ultra Dome passenger cars. Colorado Railcar cars measure 19 ft 9 1/2 in (6,033 mm) in height and have steps that enter to a lower deck that is 51 in (1,295 mm) above the rail.

Other designs, including rolling stock made by Colorado Railcar, Budd, Pullman-Standard, Bombardier and others have an entrance on the lower deck rather than an intermediate level. Amtrak Superliners are double-decker cars of this variety, with the entrance a step or so up from the lowest station platform level, or at the level of slightly higher platforms, and allow passage from car to car on the upper level.

Some operators in the United States use a specific design of bi-level car known as a "gallery car" (see below).

==== Long-distance trains ====
Most of Amtrak's intercity passenger trains operating to points west of Chicago use Superliners, as do select trains east of Chicago, like the Capitol Limited and Auto Train. In addition, Alaska Railroad operates passenger trains with a mix of traditional passenger equipment and large fleets of Colorado Railcar Ultra Domes (sometimes as many as 15 in one train) owned by several major cruise ship lines.

==== Northeastern United States ====
Most passenger rail lines in the Northeast have a loading gauge that can only accommodate cars 14 ft 6 in (4,420 mm) or less in height. This is due to structure gauge restrictions such as bridges and tunnels that are too low, and may also have electrified lines overhead.

Nevertheless, commuter railroads such as the Long Island Rail Road, New Jersey Transit, MARC, and MBTA all use bilevel railcars built to unique designs to clear specific structure gauge problems on those systems. The bilevels used on LIRR were built by Kawasaki Rail Car, Inc., while the bilevel cars used by NJ Transit were built by Bombardier. MARC uses bilevel cars from both Kawasaki and Bombardier, while the MBTA uses bilevel cars from Kawasaki and Hyundai Rotem.

In each of these agencies' bilevel cars, two levels are present between the trucks of the car. At each end, stairs lead from both levels to a common floor which is located at standard height over the trucks. All LIRR bilevel passenger rail cars have two wide quarter-point doors on each side, for high level platforms only. The bilevel cars used by NJ Transit and Exo have four doors on each side, two quarter-point doors at high level platform height and one at each end vestibule, with traps used to reach low level platforms. The bilevel cars used by MBTA have side doors with traps at each end vestibule. MARC operates both of the latter two types of cars.

The Superliners used for many Amtrak intercity services do not fit in these systems. Single-deck Viewliners and Amfleet IIs are used instead.

==== California ====
Due to the typically-generous clearances on California railroads due to freight railroads expanding clearances to accommodate double-stacked containers, bilevel cars are common in the state. Caltrans owns 88 California Cars, which are based on the Superliner body shell, but with high-density interiors suitable for corridor trains. These cars, along with 39 owned directly by Amtrak, are dedicated to state-subsidized Amtrak California routes including the Gold Runner, Capitol Corridor and Pacific Surfliner routes. The Surfliner also serves Amtrak's California lines.

Metrolink, which serves Southern California, has 137 active Bombardier BiLevel Coaches (Sentinel Fleet) and 137 Hyundai Rotem bi-level cars (Guardian Fleet).

Caltrain in the Bay Area uses both Bombardier BiLevels and Nippon Sharyo gallery cars. From 2024, bilevel Stadler KISS electric multiple units operate on the newly electrified network.

==== Florida ====
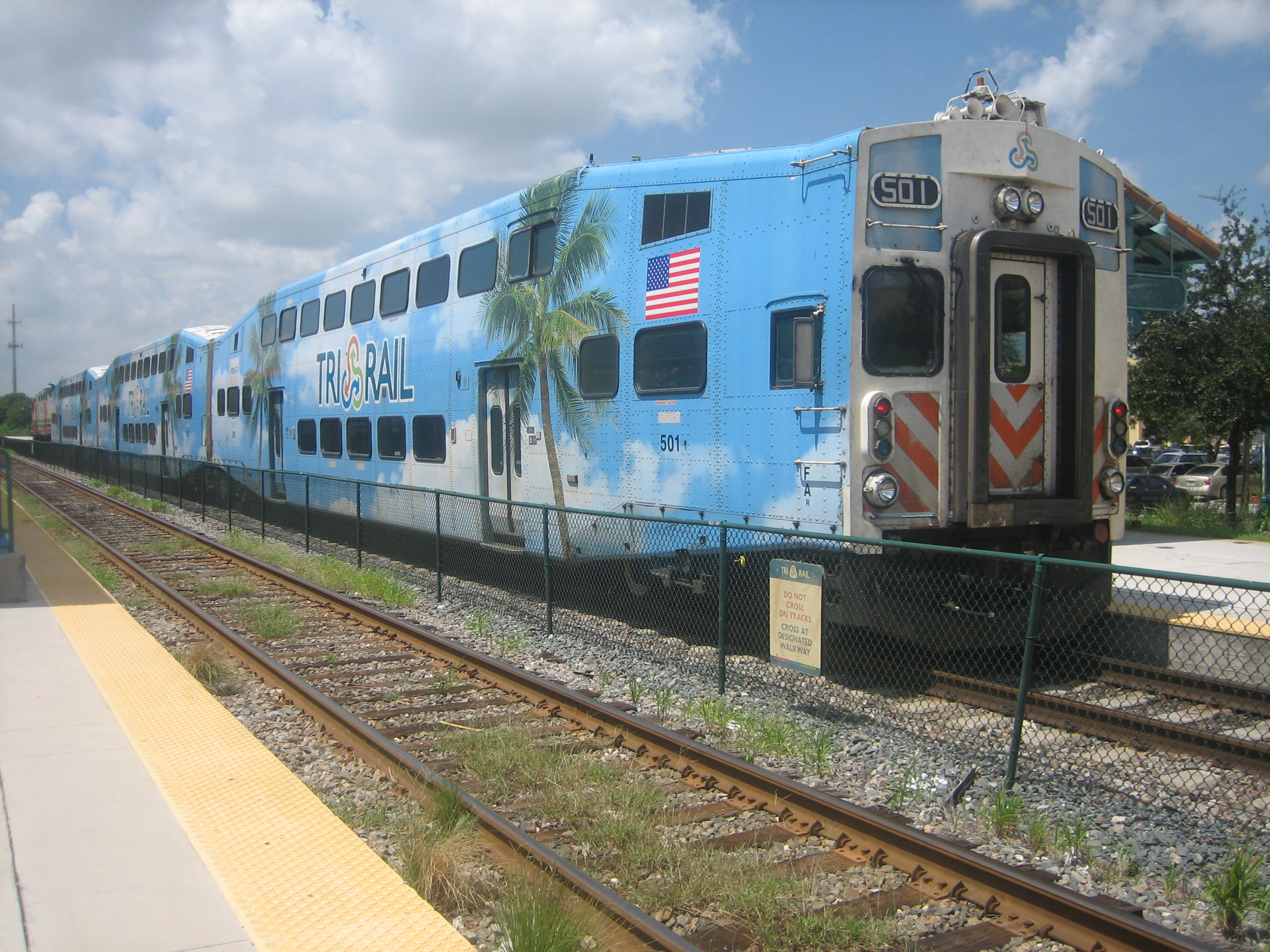
UTDC BiLevel Coach in old Tri-Rail livery at the Deerfield Beach Tri-Rail station

Southeast Florida's Tri-Rail commuter service between Miami and West Palm Beach uses the Bombardier BiLevel Coach and Rotem Commuter Cars. SunRail, which serves the Greater Orlando area, also uses Bombardier BiLevel coaches.

==== Illinois ====
Metra has a large fleet of gallery cars, and Highliner II gallery electric multiple units (EMUs). The NICTD South Shore Line fleet also includes very similar gallery EMUs. Chicago does not have the loading gauge problems that affect passenger rail lines in most northeastern states because it has very few railroad tunnels for the lines of these passenger trains except for a brief distance in the city.

In January 2021, the Metra board approved the purchase of 200 of a new design of multilevel car from Alstom, with options for up to 300 more.

Former Metra coaches were operated by a number of other agencies in the first two decades of the twenty-first century; as of 2021, they are still used for Nashville's WeGo Star (formerly branded as the Music City Star).

==== Massachusetts ====
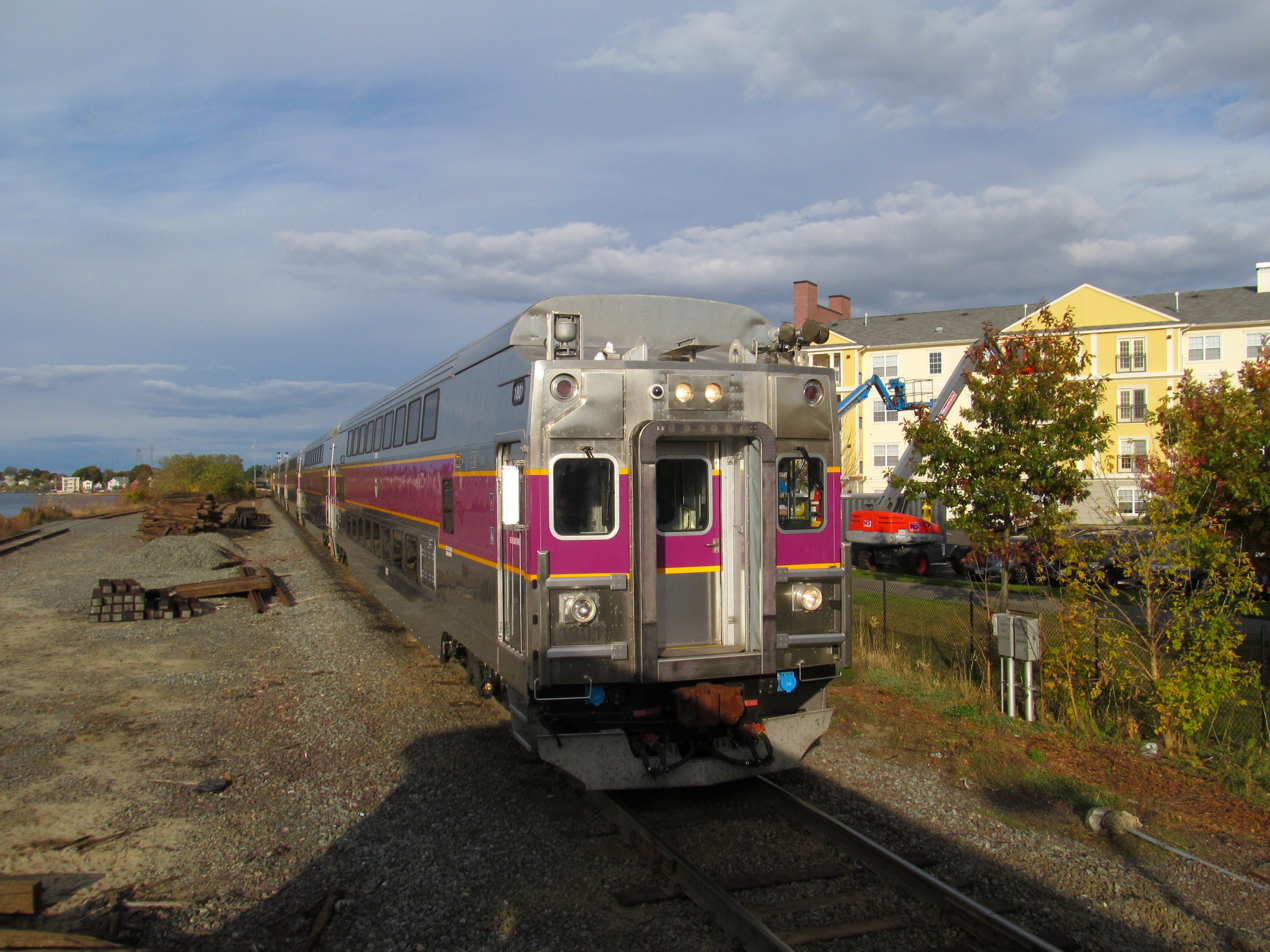
Hyundai Rotem bilevel car approaching Salem, Massachusetts

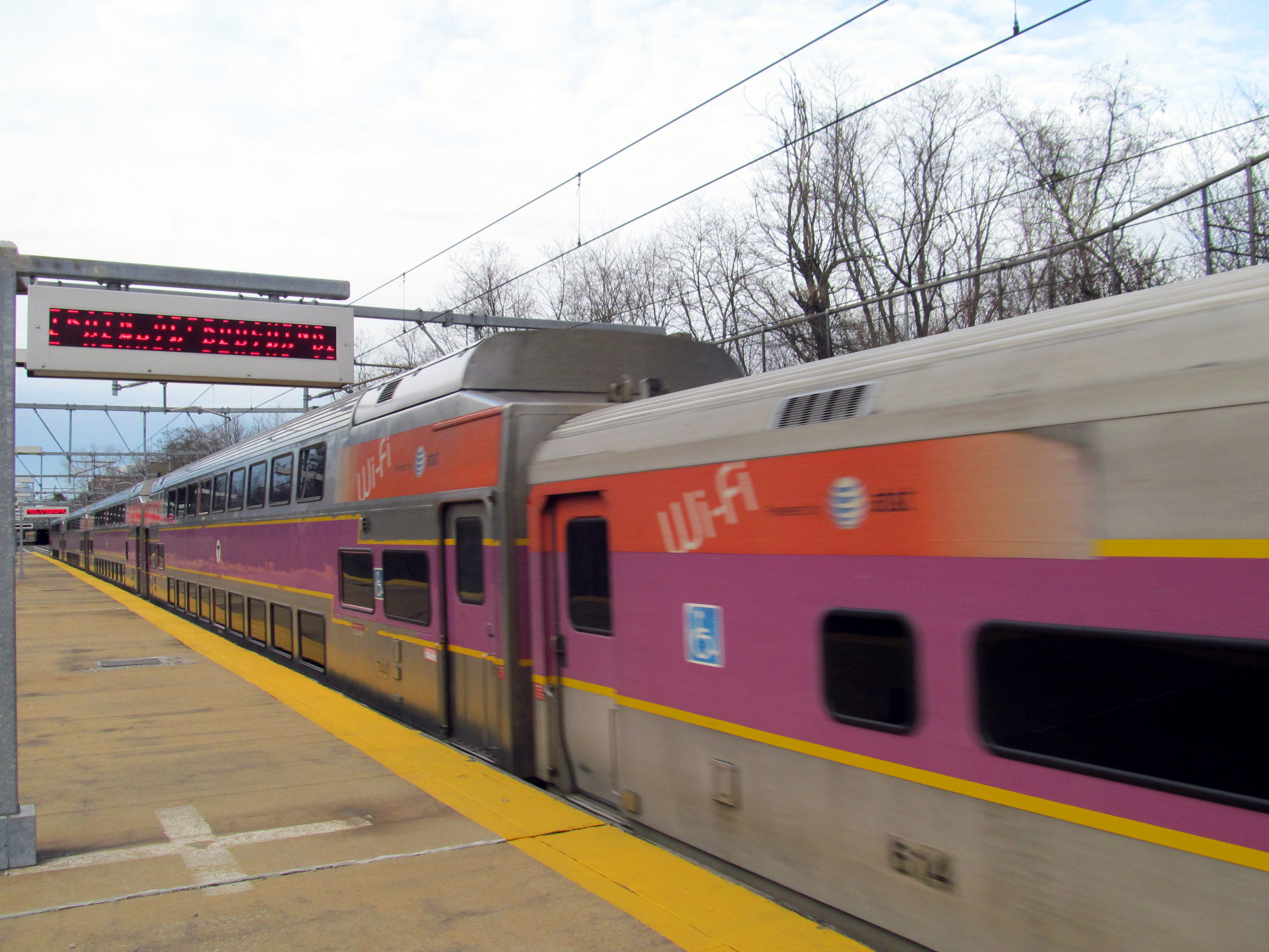
The MBTA utilizes both bilevel and single level railcars. Unlike some bi-levels, MBTA's may be used with single-level cars.

The MBTA is the public agency responsible for operating most public transport services in Greater Boston. Its MBTA Commuter Rail system currently uses 277 bilevel passenger cars made by Kawasaki and Hyundai Rotem.

==== New Mexico ====
The New Mexico Rail Runner Express utilizes Bombardier BiLevel cars on its route from Santa Fe, New Mexico to Belen, New Mexico.

==== Virginia ====
Virginia Railway Express operated 13 Kawasaki bi-level cars between 1999 and 2008, after which they were sold to MARC (these cars were originally procured as an option on MARC's larger order). From 2001, VRE also operated a number of ex-Metra Pullman-Standard gallery cars. These were all gradually replaced by new Sumitomo/Nippon Sharyo gallery cars between 2006 and 2018.

==== Utah ====
FrontRunner commuter rail, operated by the Utah Transit Authority to connect multiple cities along the Wasatch Front, utilizes Bombardier BiLevel Coaches.

=== Other countries ===
==== Asia ====
In Iran, the Tehran-Hashtgerd suburban commuter line is served with electric push-pull hauled trainsets with double-decker carriages manufactured by Wagon Pars in Iran.

In the Philippines, bilevel trams ran on the Tranvias of Manila. These were push–pull trains carried by lightweight steam locomotives. There were also double-deck sleeping cars used on the Bicol Express until 2014.

In South Korea, ITX-Cheongchun, the express train of Korail uses double-decker cars along with single-decker ones.

In Vietnam, the train operated by Vietnam Railways between Saigon and Phan Thiet occasionally carries double deck carriages to fulfil extra demand.

==== Europe ====
In Germany, Bombardier's double-deck rail cars are also used extensively on suburban trains by the DB. The same rail cars serve some of the routes on the Israel Railways network, hauled by diesel locomotives and include electric generators housed in the control car. Belgian latest models (M6 and M7 cars) also belong to the Bombardier double deck family while the older M5 are based on the French VB2N.

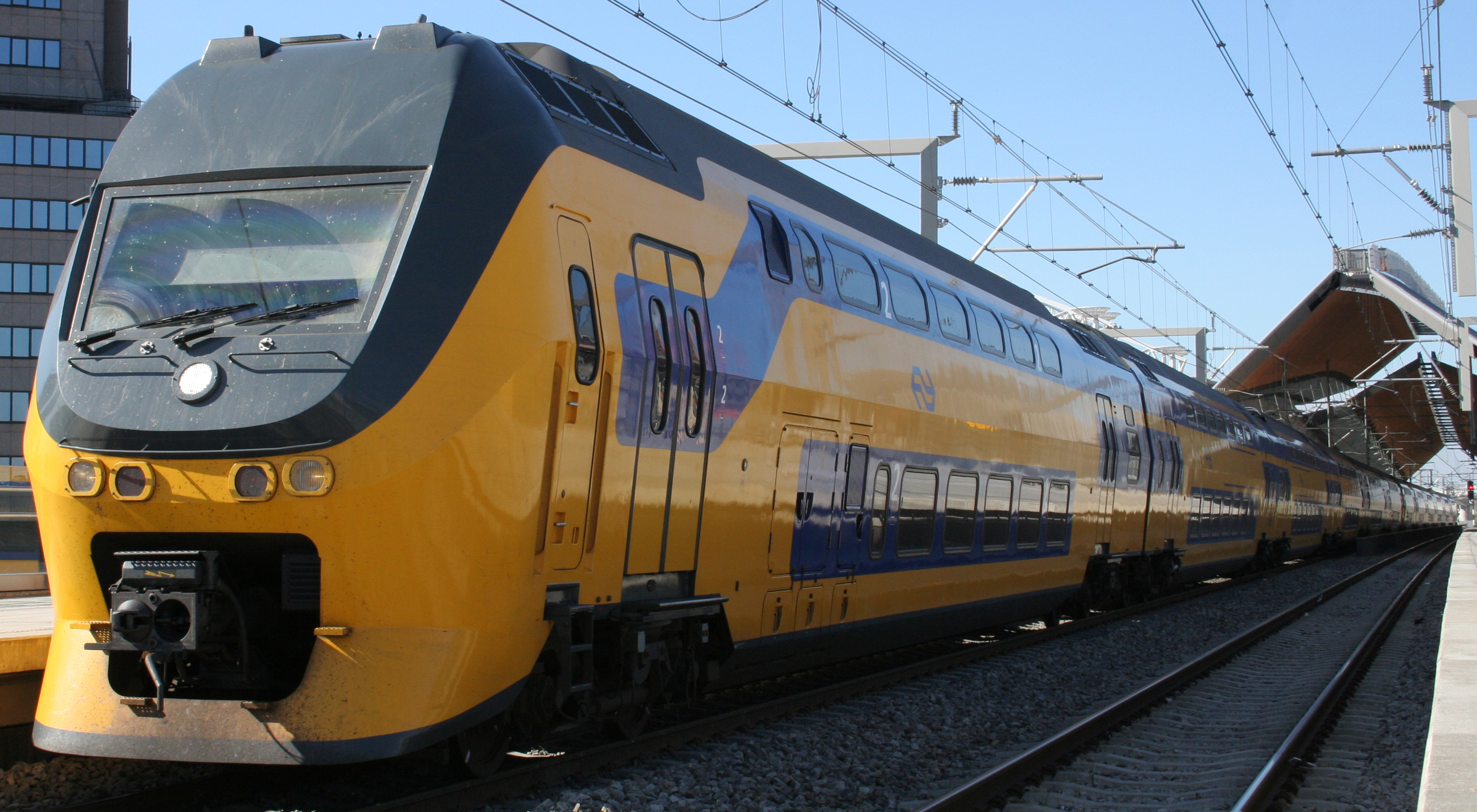
Dutch NS VIRM bilevel train at station Amsterdam Bijlmer ArenA

In the Netherlands, there are two types of double-deck trains in use, the VIRM and the DDZ. The VIRM, is an example from the Netherlands, of High platform (split level) double-decker multiple units. It is one step up from the station platform to the entrance, and from there seven steps upstairs or four steps downstairs. There are two retired types of double-deck trains, the DDM-1 and the DD-AR who were retired from regular service on 15 December 2019. DDZ trainsets are made of refurbished DD-AR coaches with a six-axle MDDM power car.

In Portugal, CP Urban Services and Fertagus use double-deck trains around Lisbon in commuter rail services.

In Spain, several lines of Cercanías (Renfe's commuter rail service) use double-deck trainsets.

In Romania, some regional trains use bilevel cars. Over 200 bi-level cars were imported from Waggonbau Görlitz starting with the early 1980s.

== Gallery cars ==
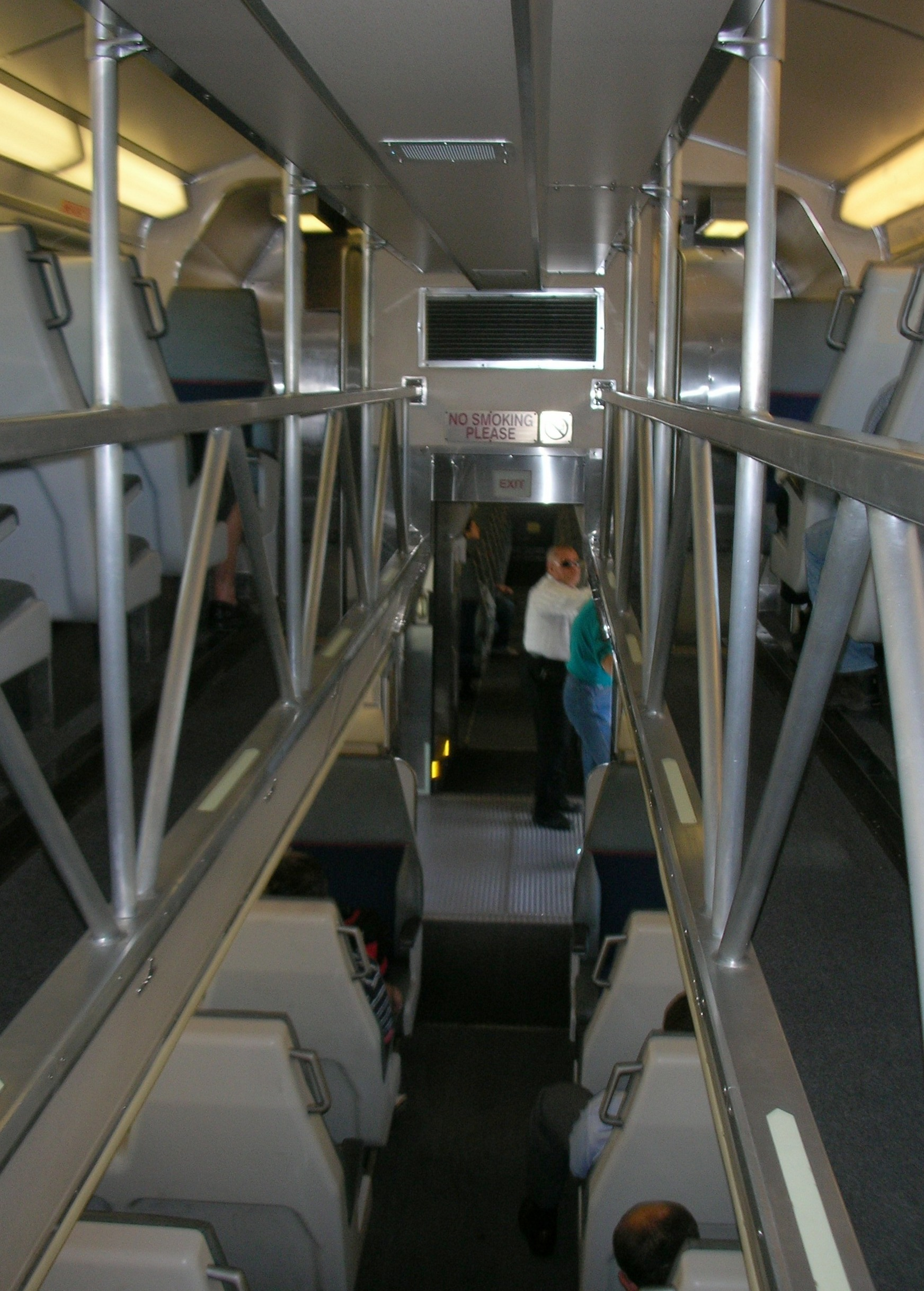
A Nippon Sharyo bi-level passenger car operated by Caltrain

=== Design ===
Because the two levels are separate on most bi-level cars, there is a physical limitation on a single conductor, as it can be difficult for them to check and sell tickets to passengers on the two levels. Gallery cars feature upper levels, which are "mezzanines" or "balconies" running along both sides of the car, with an open area between them. The split balcony enables conductors walking along on the lower level to easily reach up and punch or validate tickets of the passengers seated on the mezzanine level. Passengers can place their tickets in clips along a lengthwise panel, located slightly above the conductor's head and within easy reach. The conductor can then check all tickets and move to the next car.

Most gallery cars have four separate galleries with four separate stairwells to the main level (one gallery on each side, split in the middle by the central vestibule). These stairwells are adjacent to the central vestibule where the exterior doors are situated. There is typically a low first step at the vestibule entrance to the car, which is 14 5/8 inches (371 mm) above the head of the rail. However, Metra Electric Highliner (now retired) and Highliner II have high-level entrances for the high-level platforms on that line. NICTD South Shore Line Bi-Levels are similar to the Metra Highliner IIs but have entrances at the end of the rail car opposite the cab with a stairwell and trap doors for low-level platforms.

=== Manufacturers and operators ===
The Chicago, Burlington and Quincy was the first railroad to receive gallery cars, built by the Budd Company in 1950. In total, 141 cars of this design were delivered to the CB&Q (and its successors) between 1950 and 1978. The Milwaukee Road ordered a revised design of gallery car from Budd in 1961, and production ran until 1980. Over 250 of this design were produced, including a small batch for the Rock Island Line. Most of these Budd gallery cars are still in service with Metra. The design was also licensed to Canadian Vickers, who built 9 cars for Canadian Pacific in 1970 for commuter service in Montreal.

In 1955, the Chicago and North Western ordered 16 gallery cars from the St. Louis Car Company. Unlike the stainless steel Budd cars, these cars have smooth, painted steel bodyshells. Further orders were built by Pullman-Standard between 1956 and 1970, with minor revisions to the design, including a cab car variant from 1960 onwards. Over 250 were built for the C&NW, Rock Island Line and their successors, a small number of which remain in service. After initial retirement from Metra in the late 1990s, many of these cars were acquired by other commuter rail agencies across the United States, including (among others) UTA FrontRunner, MARC, WeGo Star and Virginia Railway Express. Southern Pacific also acquired 46 Pullman-Standard gallery cars for the Peninsula Commute service in San Francisco in three orders: 1955, 1957 (built by American Car and Foundry to Pullman-Standard designs) and 1968.

To replace the Southern Pacific gallery cars, Caltrain acquired new gallery cars from Nippon Sharyo in 1985. A second batch followed in 1999-2000. Further orders for this design were placed by Metra and Virginia Railway Express between 2002 and 2008. Follow-on contracts included options for additional cars, the last of which were delivered in 2020. Morrison-Knudsen/Amerail had also built similar gallery cars for Metra between 1992 and 1998, using bodyshells provided by Nippon Sharyo.

=== Highliner electric multiple unit ===
The Highliner and Highliner II, along with similar vehicles in the NICTD South Shore Line fleet, are electric multiple units formed of gallery cars. The Highliner I was built by the St. Louis Car Company in 1971 for the Illinois Central, with additional cars built by Bombardier in 1978-1979. These were replaced by Highliner II EMUs built by Nippon Sharyo in 2005.

== See also ==
- Autorack
  - Double-stack rail transport
  - Piggyback (transportation)
- Double-decker bus
- Double-decker tram
- Super Dome (railcar)
