= Keihan 3000 series (1971) =

Japanese train type

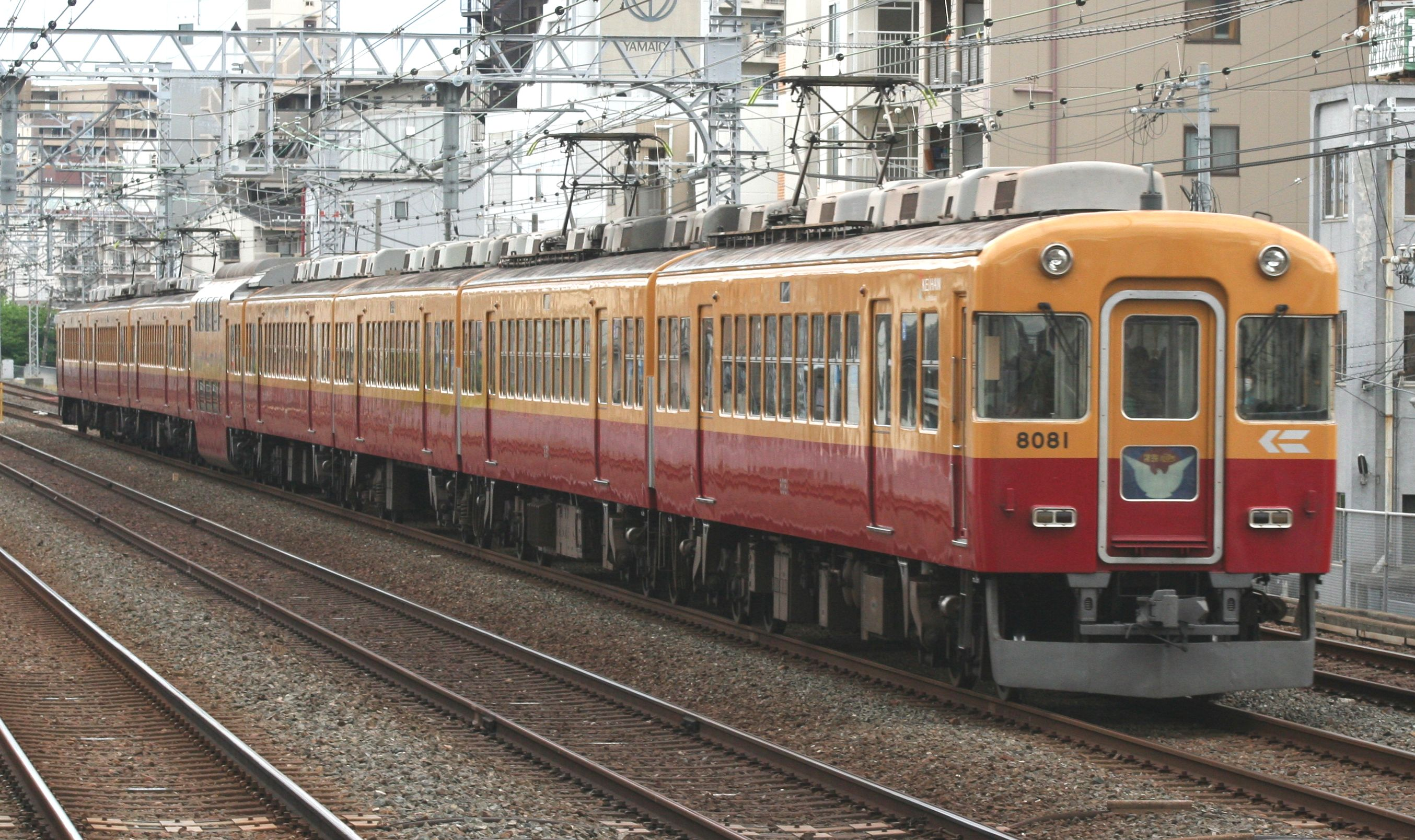
- A 3000 series train, then classified as 8000-30 series, in May 2012
- In service: 1971–2013
- Manufacturer: Kawasaki Heavy Industries
- Family name: TV Car
- Constructed: 1971–1973
- Entered service: 1 July 1971
- Number built: 58 vehicles
- Number preserved: 1 vehicle
- Operators: Keihan Electric Railway; Toyama Chihō Railway (as 10030 series); Ōigawa Railway (as 3000 series)

Specifications
- Doors: Two doors per side (per car)
- Maximum speed: 110 km/h (68 mph)
- Power output: 175 kW (235 hp) per motor
- Electric system: 1,500 V DC overhead lines
- Current collection: Pantograph
- Bogies: FS381 / FS381B; KS-132A
- Track gauge: 1,435 mm (4 ft 8 1/2 in)

The Keihan 3000 series (京阪3000系, Keihan 3000-kei) was an electric multiple unit (EMU) train type operated by the private railway operator Keihan Electric Railway in Japan from 1971 until 2013. From 2008 on, the 3000 series was designated as 8000-30 series (8000系30番台).

== History ==
Construction began in 1971 and resumed until 1973. Internally, the trains were fitted with color TVs. With the introduction of the Keihan 8000 series from 1989, the 3000 series trains were gradually replaced. A bi-level car was added to a 3000 series set in 1995. After the introduction of the new Keihan 3000 series in 2008, the old 3000 series was redesignated as 8000-30 series. The 3000 series was withdrawn from services by Keihan in March 2013.

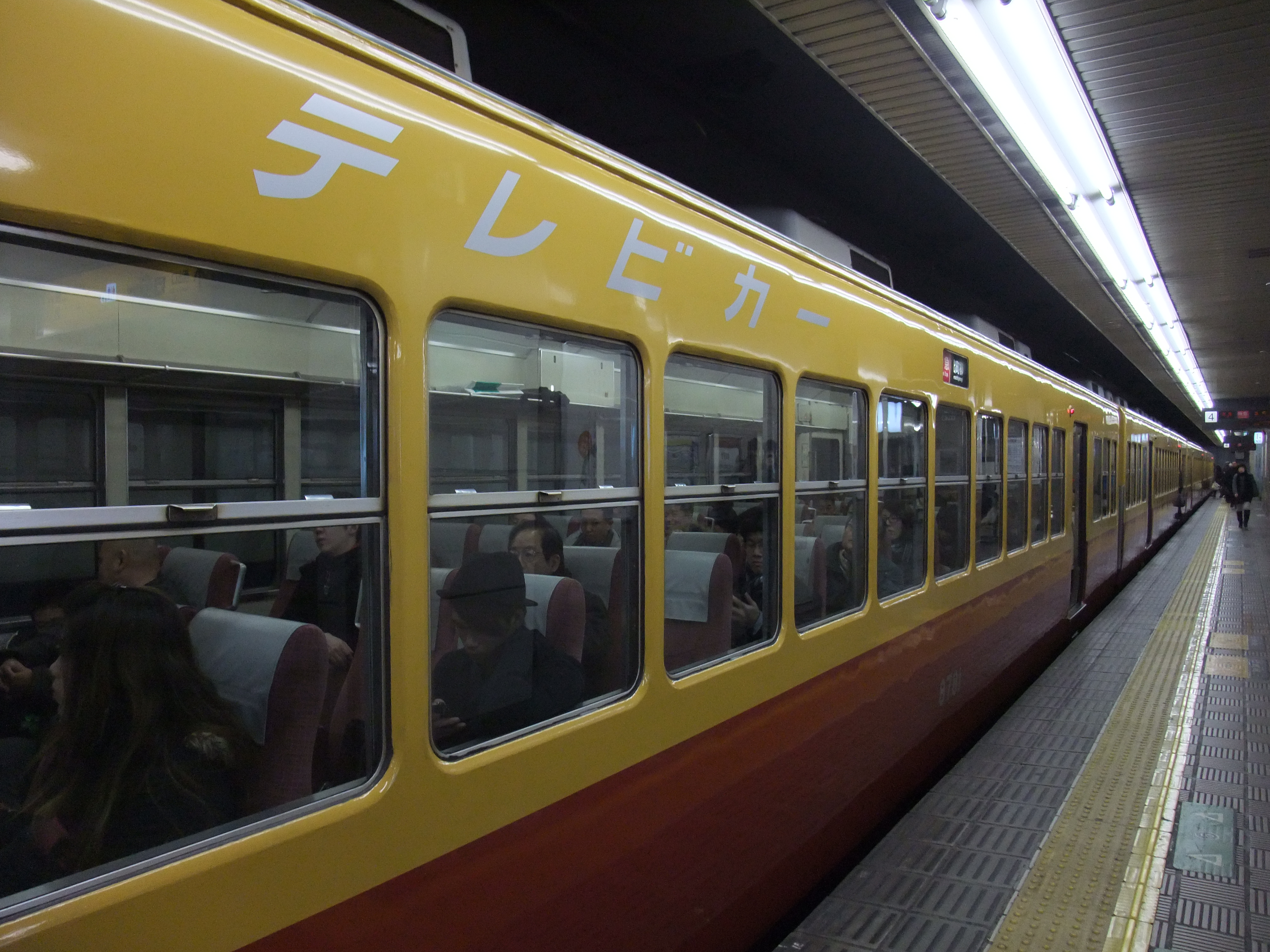
Car of 8781 "TV Car"

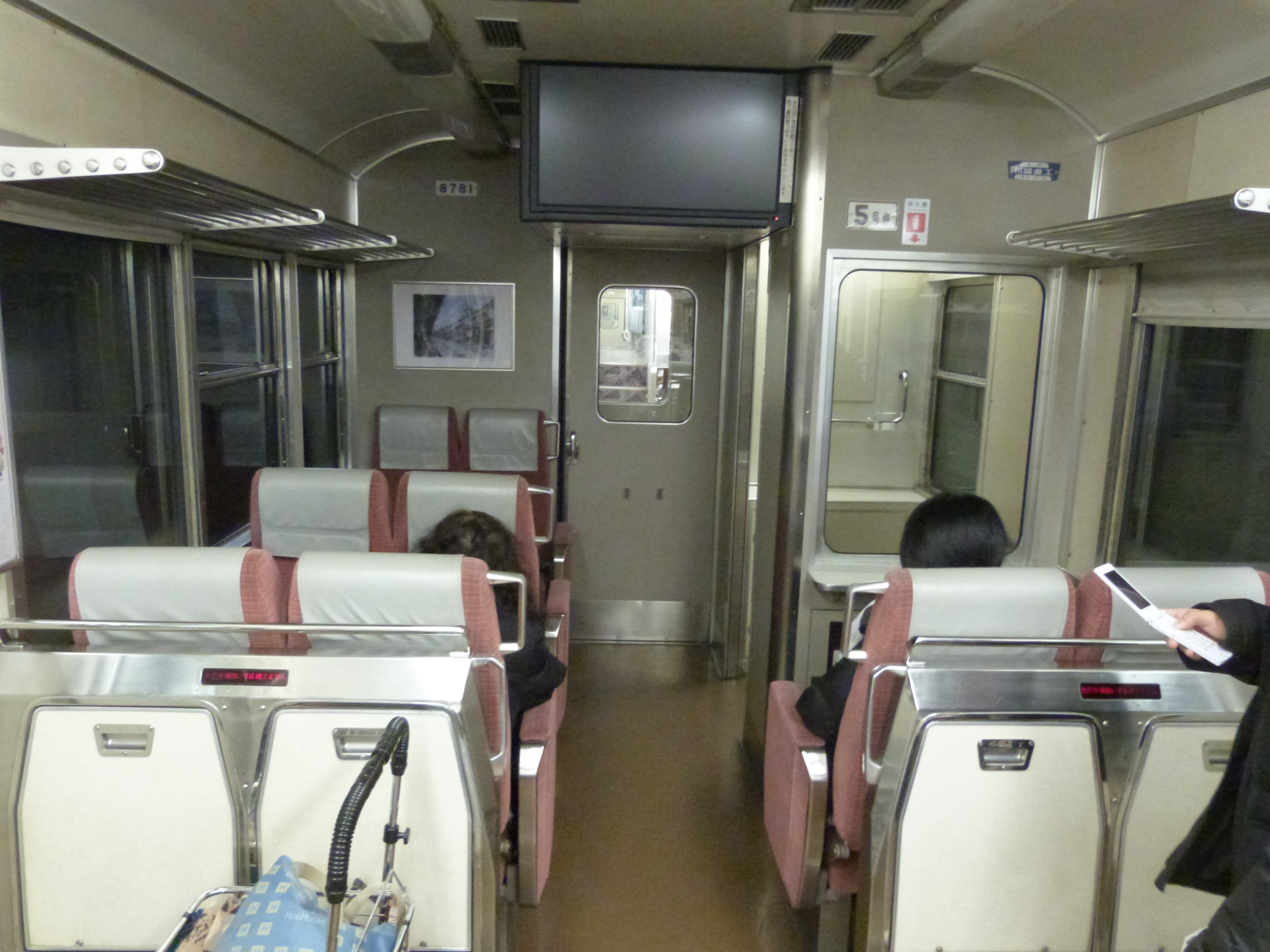
Interior of a car with ceiling-mounted TV

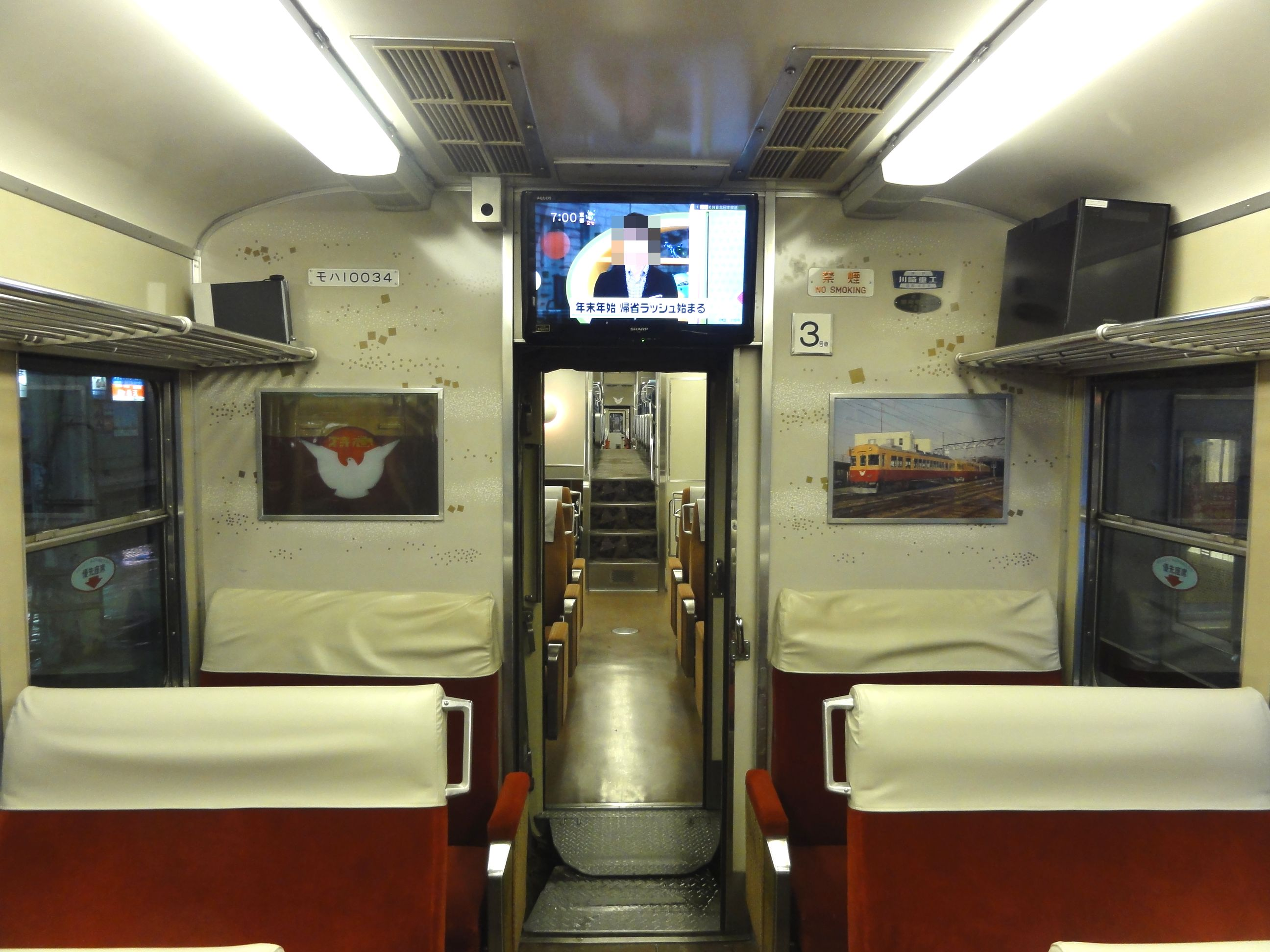
Toyama Chiho Railway car with ceiling-mounted TV

== Other operators ==
=== Toyama Chihō Railway ===
Between 1990 and 1993, Toyama Chihō Railway received 16 former Keihan 3000 series cars, and classified them as 10030 series (10030形). A bi-level car was transferred from Keihan to Toyama Chihō Railway in 2013.

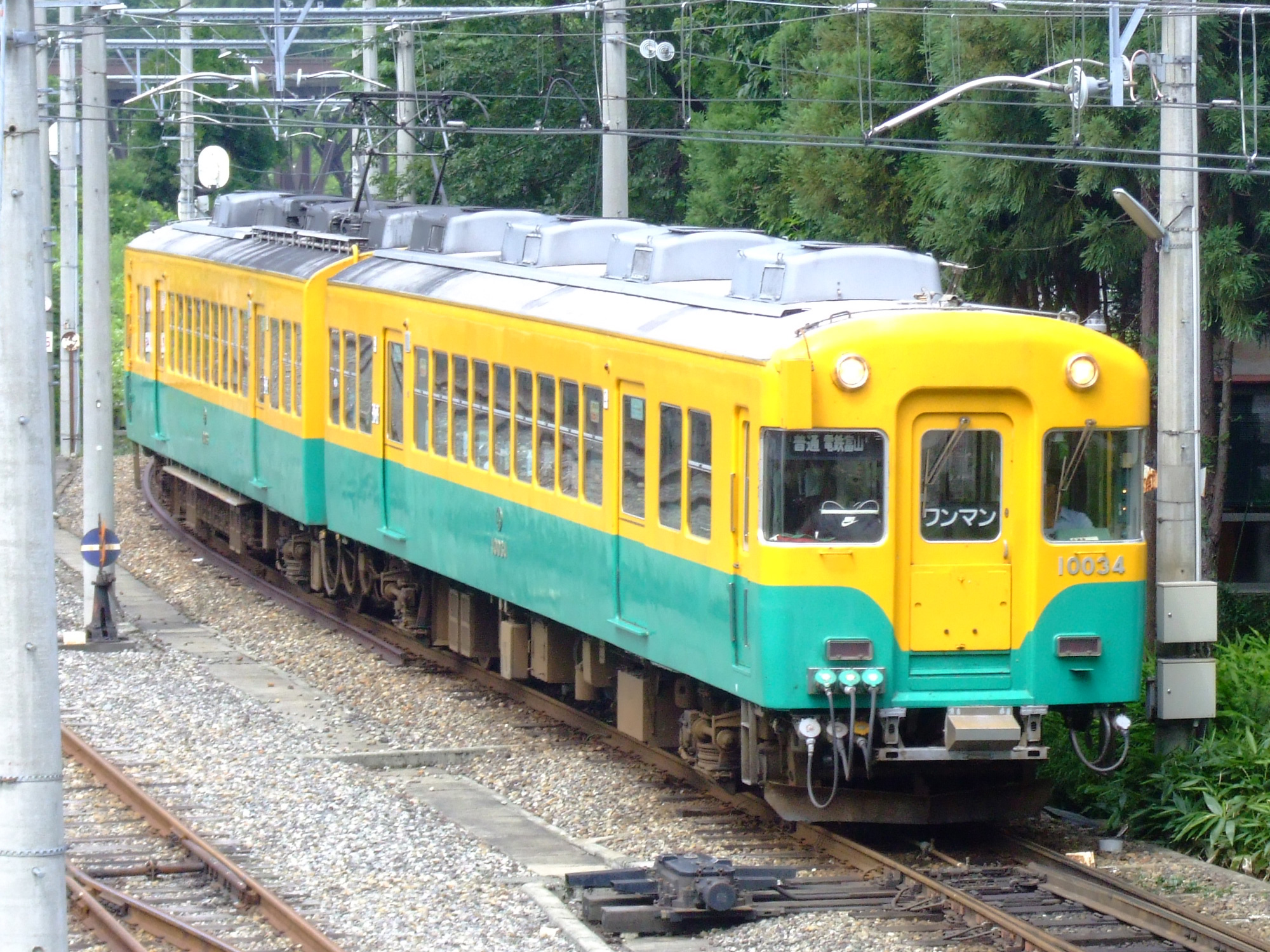
Toyama Chihō Railway 10030 series

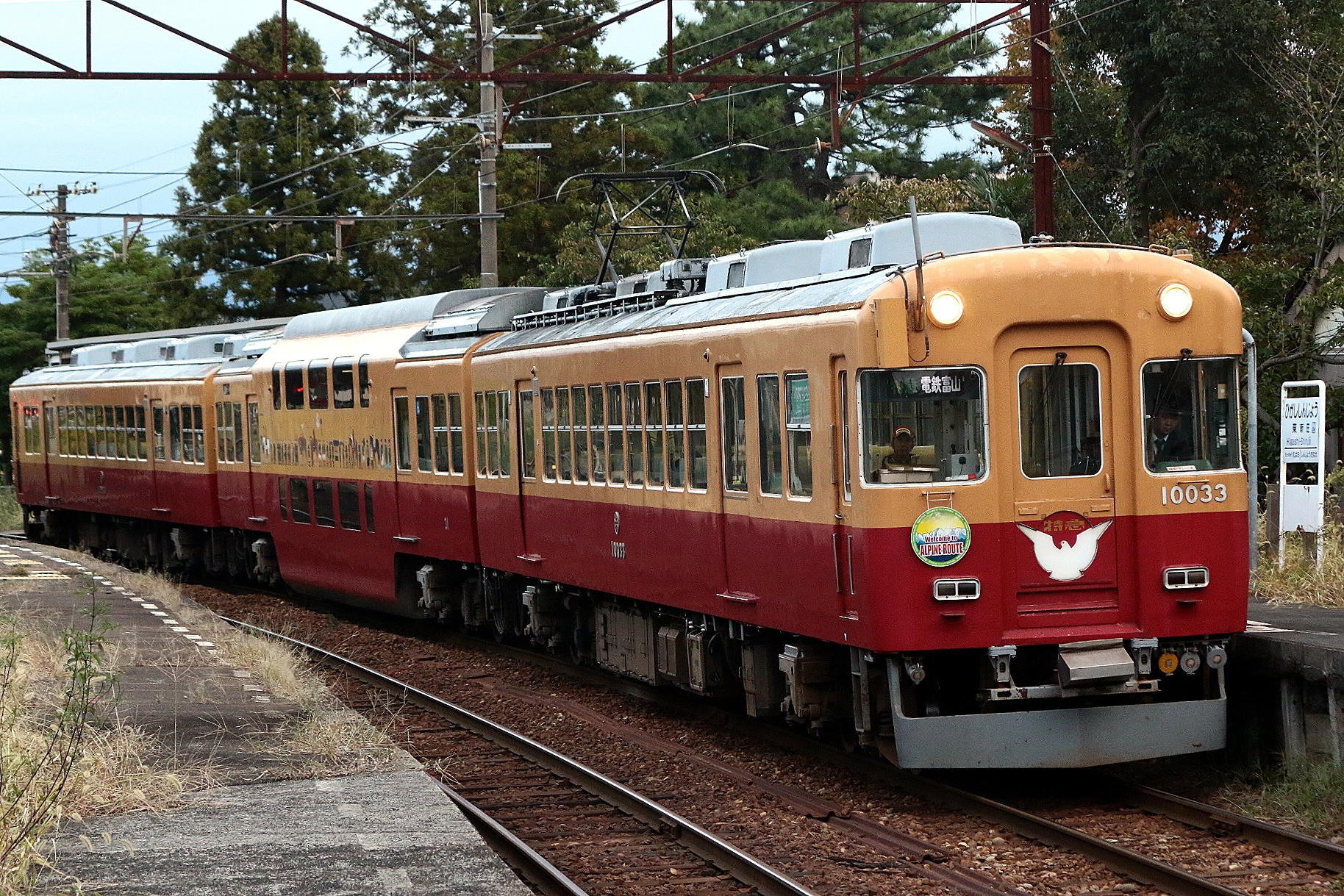
10030 series with bi-level car

=== Ōigawa Railway ===
Until 2014, Ōigawa Railway also operated a former Keihan 3000 series train.

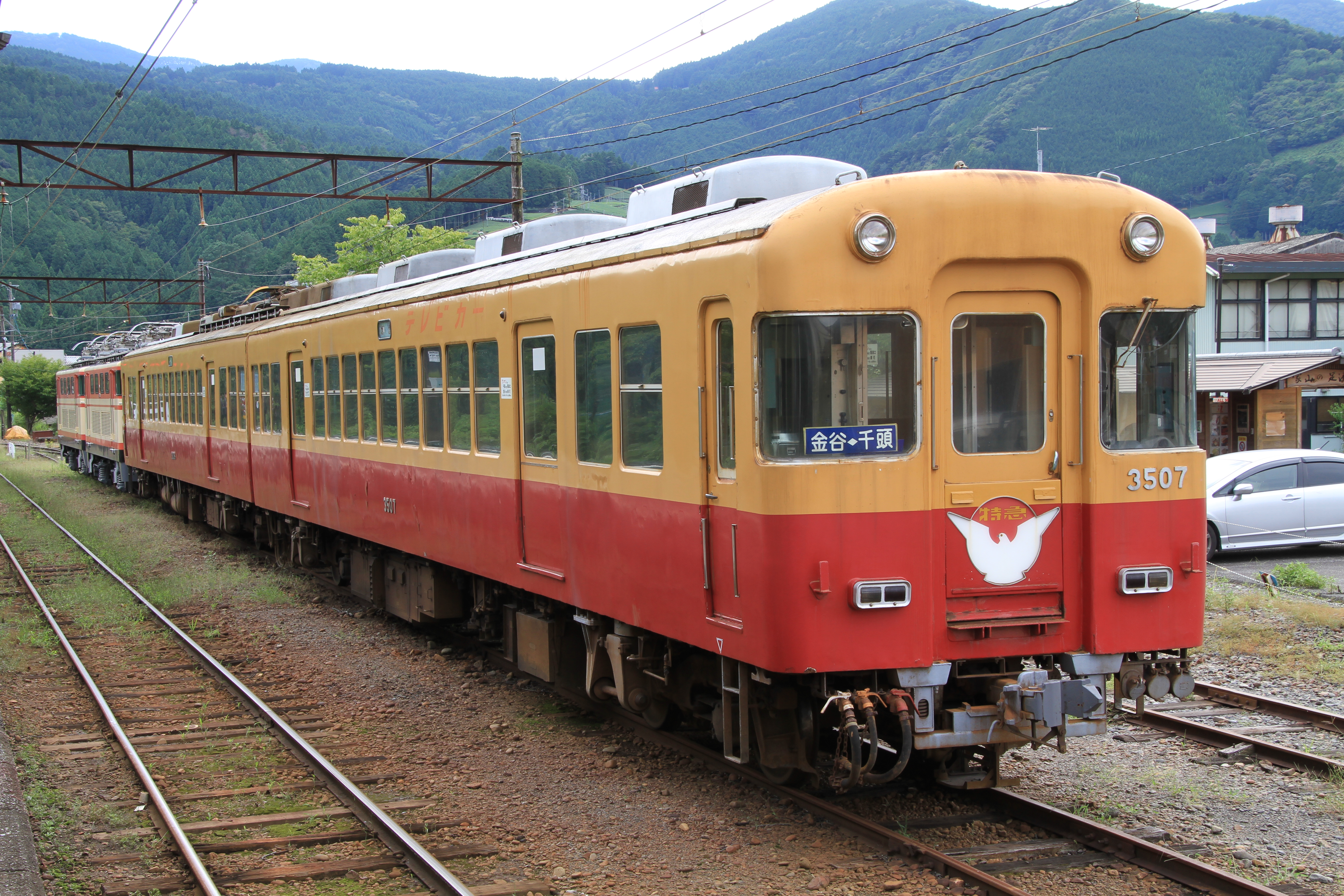
Ōigawa Railway 3000 series

== Preserved examples ==
- One car is preserved at Kuzuha Mall.
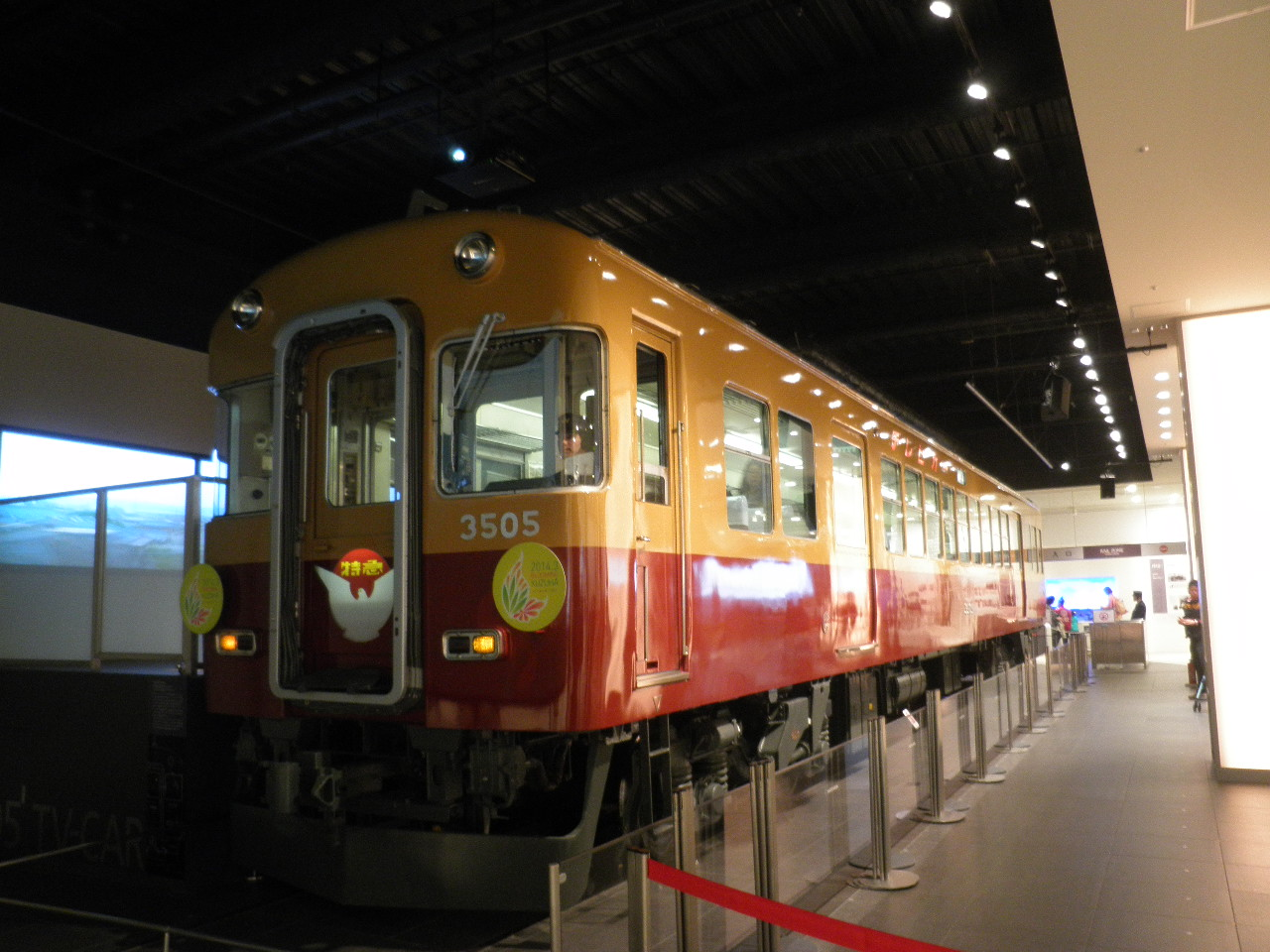
3505 in March 2014
