= Keihan 13000 series =

Japanese commuter train

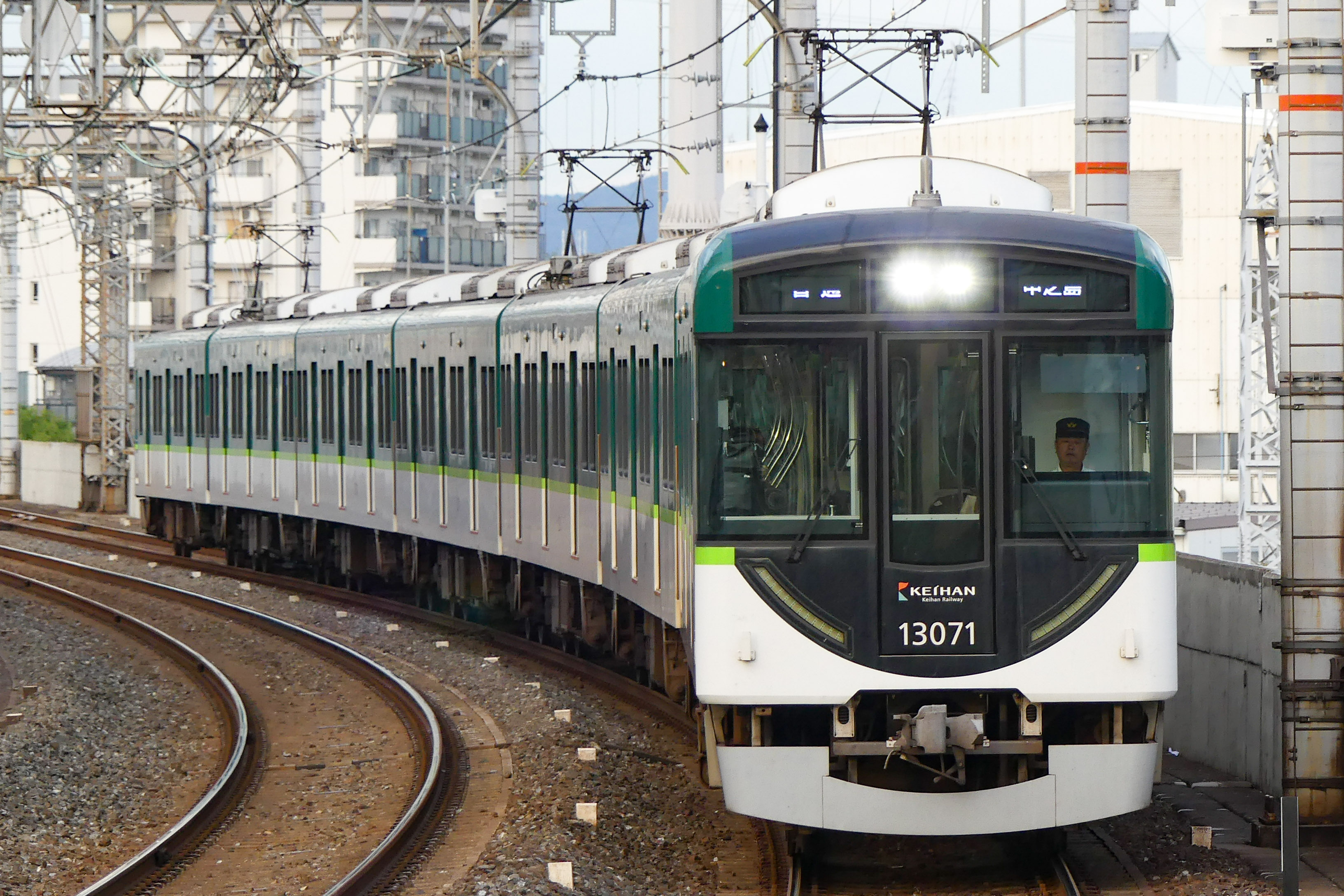
- 7-car set 13021 in September 2018
- In service: 2012–present
- Manufacturer: Kawasaki Heavy Industries
- Built at: Kobe
- Family name: City commuter
- Replaced: 2600 series; 5000 series
- Constructed: 2012–
- Entered service: 14 April 2012
- Number built: 119 vehicles (as of October 2024)
- Number in service: 65 vehicles (12 sets) (2 vehicles transferred from 3000 series)
- Formation: 4/7 cars per trainset
- Fleet numbers: 13001– (4-car sets); 13021– (7-car sets)
- Capacity: 530 (4-car sets)
- Operator: Keihan Electric Railway
- Lines served: 4-car sets; Keihan Katano Line; Keihan Uji Line; 7-car sets; Keihan Main Line; Keihan Nakanoshima Line; Keihan Ōtō Line

Specifications
- Car body construction: Aluminium alloy
- Car length: 18,900 mm (62 ft 0 in) (end cars); 18,700 mm (61 ft 4 in) (intermediate cars)
- Width: 2,792 mm (9 ft 1.9 in)
- Doors: 3 pairs per side
- Maximum speed: 110 km/h (68 mph)
- Traction system: Variable-frequency (IGBT/SiC-MOSFET)
- Acceleration: 2.8 km/(h⋅s) (1.7 mph/s)
- Deceleration: 4.0 km/(h⋅s) (2.5 mph/s) (service); 4.3 km/(h⋅s) (2.7 mph/s) (emergency)
- Electric systems: 1,500 V DC (overhead wire)
- Current collection: Pantograph
- Bogies: KW-77D (motored), FS577 (trailer)
- Safety system: Keihan ATS
- Track gauge: 1,435 mm (4 ft 8 1/2 in)

The Keihan 13000 series (京阪13000系, Keihan 13000-kei) is an electric multiple unit (EMU) commuter train type operated by the private railway operator Keihan Electric Railway on the Keihan Uji Line and other lines in Kyoto, Japan, since April 2012. The initial order consisted of five 4-car sets, intended to replace 20 life-expired 2600 series vehicles, and as of 1 April 2017, the fleet consists of seven four-car sets and five seven-car sets.

== Design ==
The overall design concept draws on the design of the 3000 series EMU trains introduced from 2008.

The new trains included energy-saving and environmentally friendly features. The 13000 series trains used 35% less power than the 2600 series they replaced, and produce less environmental noise in service. The cars feature aluminium alloy bodies with a semi-double skin construction, and incorporate increased crash resistance.

The end cars are each equipped with one PT-4805-A scissors-type pantograph recycled from withdrawn rolling stock.

== Interior ==
Internally, LCD passenger information screens are provided above doorways.

Longitudinal bench seating use contoured "bucket seats" with a width of 470 mm (19 in) per passenger.

Luggage racks are lowered by 2 cm (0.79 in) to a height of 175 cm (69 in) for accessibility, with the racks above priority seating lowered 5 cm (2.0 in) to a height of 172 cm (68 in).

The interior flooring design is intended to evoke an image of Kyoto's traditional stone-paved streets.

The 2nd-batch sets, 13006 onward, use LED lighting.

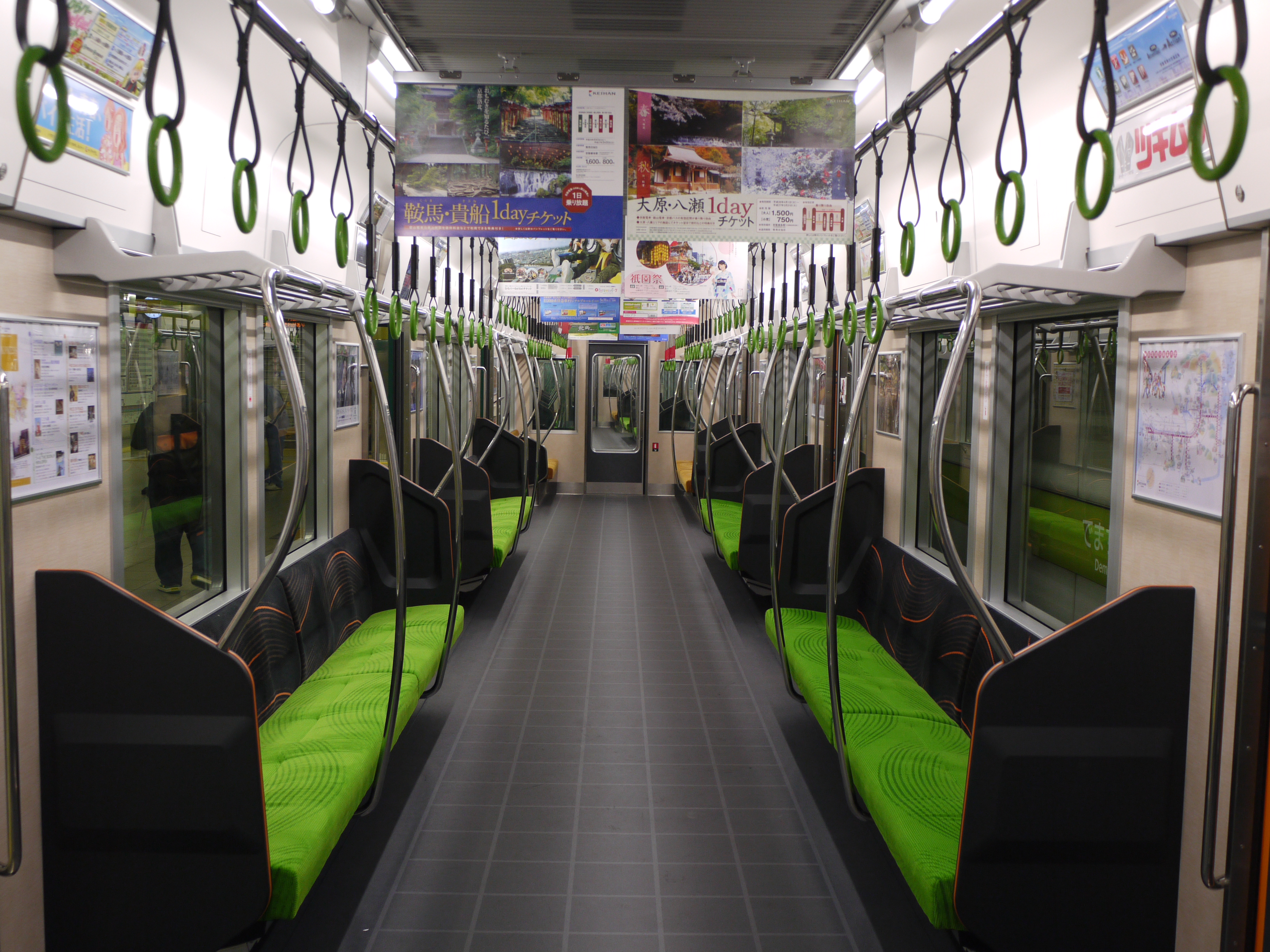
Interior of a 13020 series set, June 2014

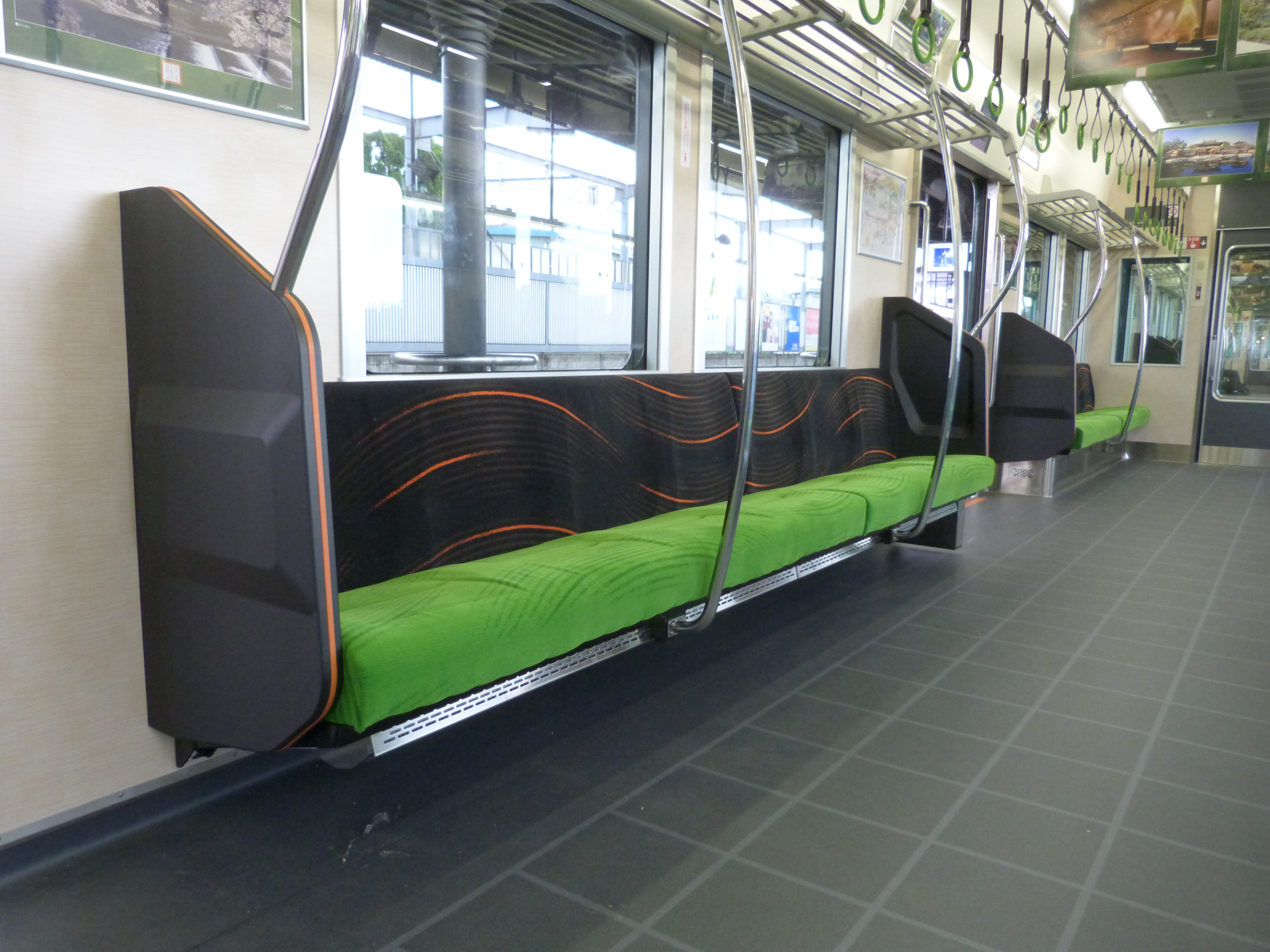
7-person bench seat

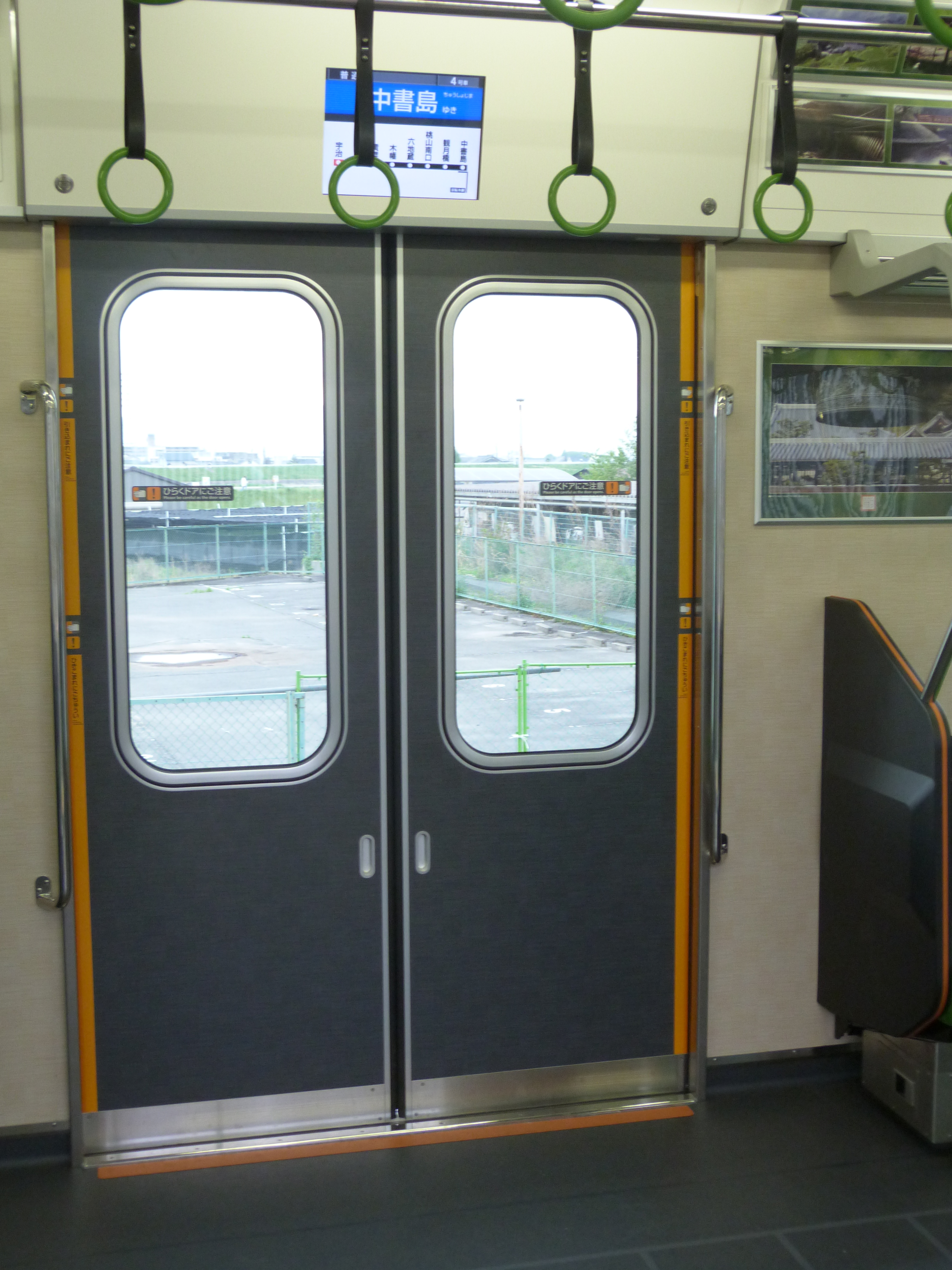
Sliding doors and LCD passenger information screen

== Formations ==
As of 1 April 2017, the fleet consists of seven four-car sets (13001 to 13007) and five seven-car sets (13021 to 13025), formed as follows, with the Mc1/Mc3 cars at the Kyoto/Uji end.

=== 4-car sets ===
==== Odd-numbered sets ====
| Designation | Mc1 | T0 | T1 | Mc4 |
| Numbering | 13000 | 13500 | 13650 | 13050 |
| Weight (t) | 36.0 | 28.5 | 26.0 | 36.5 |
| Capacity (total/seated) | 128/43 | 137/49 | 137/49 | 128/43 |

==== Even-numbered sets ====
| Designation | Mc3 | T0 | T1 | Mc2 |
| Numbering | 13000 | 13500 | 13650 | 13050 |
| Weight (t) | 36.5 | 28.5 | 26.0 | 36.0 |
| Capacity (total/seated) | 128/43 | 137/49 | 137/49 | 128/43 |

- "Mc" cars are motored driving cars (with driving cabs).
- "T" cars are unpowered trailer cars.
- The Mc cars each have one PT-4805-A scissors-type pantograph.
- The Kyoto/Uji end Mc3 cars of even-numbered sets are fitted with gangway connections, enabling coupling to the Nakanoshima end Mc4 cars of odd-numbered sets.
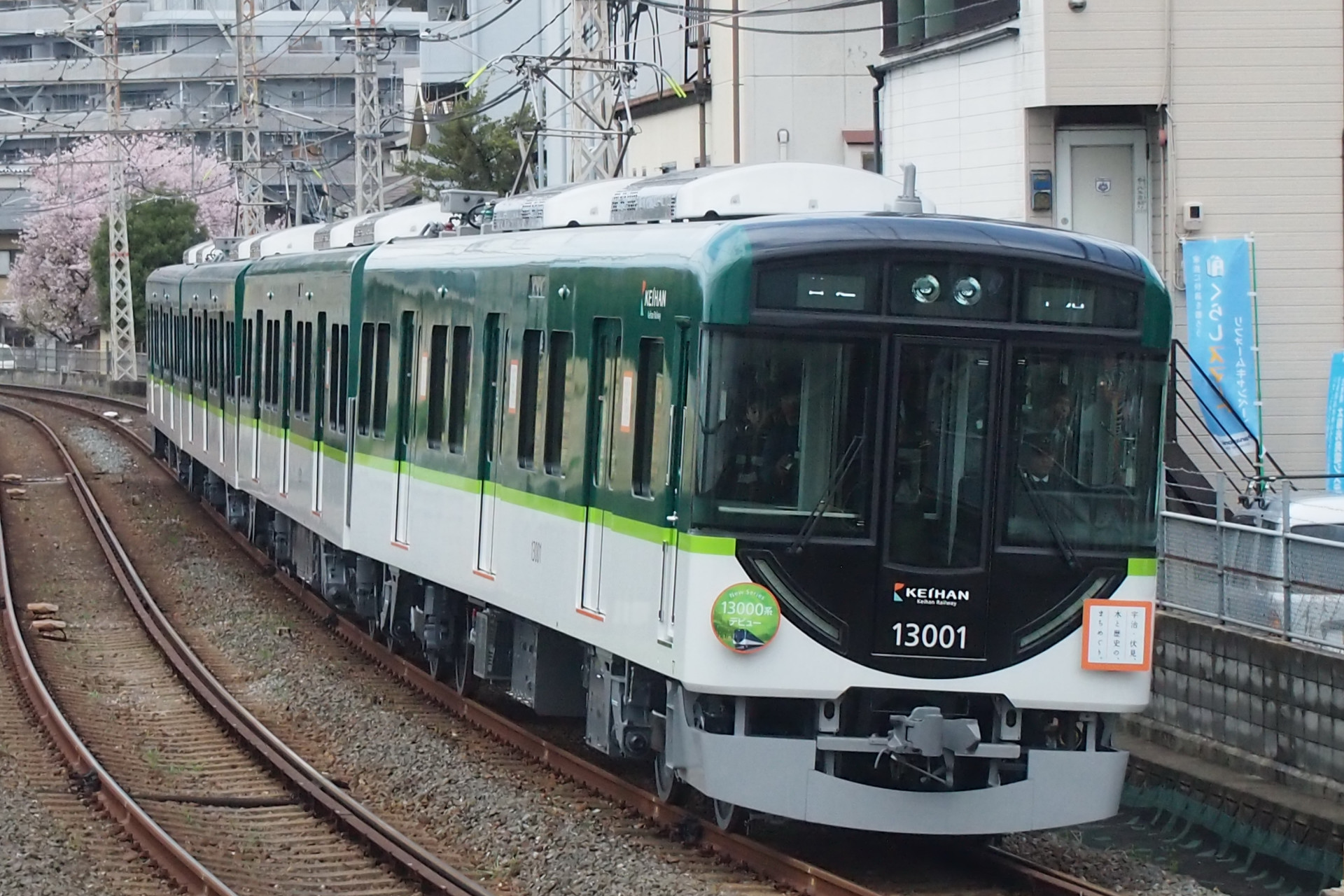
4-car set 13001 in April 2012

=== 7-car sets ===
| Designation | Mc1 | T0 | T2 | M1 | T3 | T4 | Mc2 |
| Numbering | 13020 | 13520 | 13720 | 13170 | 13570 | 13770 | 13070 |

The three motored cars (Mc1, M1, and Mc2 cars) each have one scissors-type pantograph. The "T0" car is designated as a "mildly air conditioned" car.

On sets with former 3000 series, the T4 position uses a different numbering, 13870, which corresponds to the former typing.

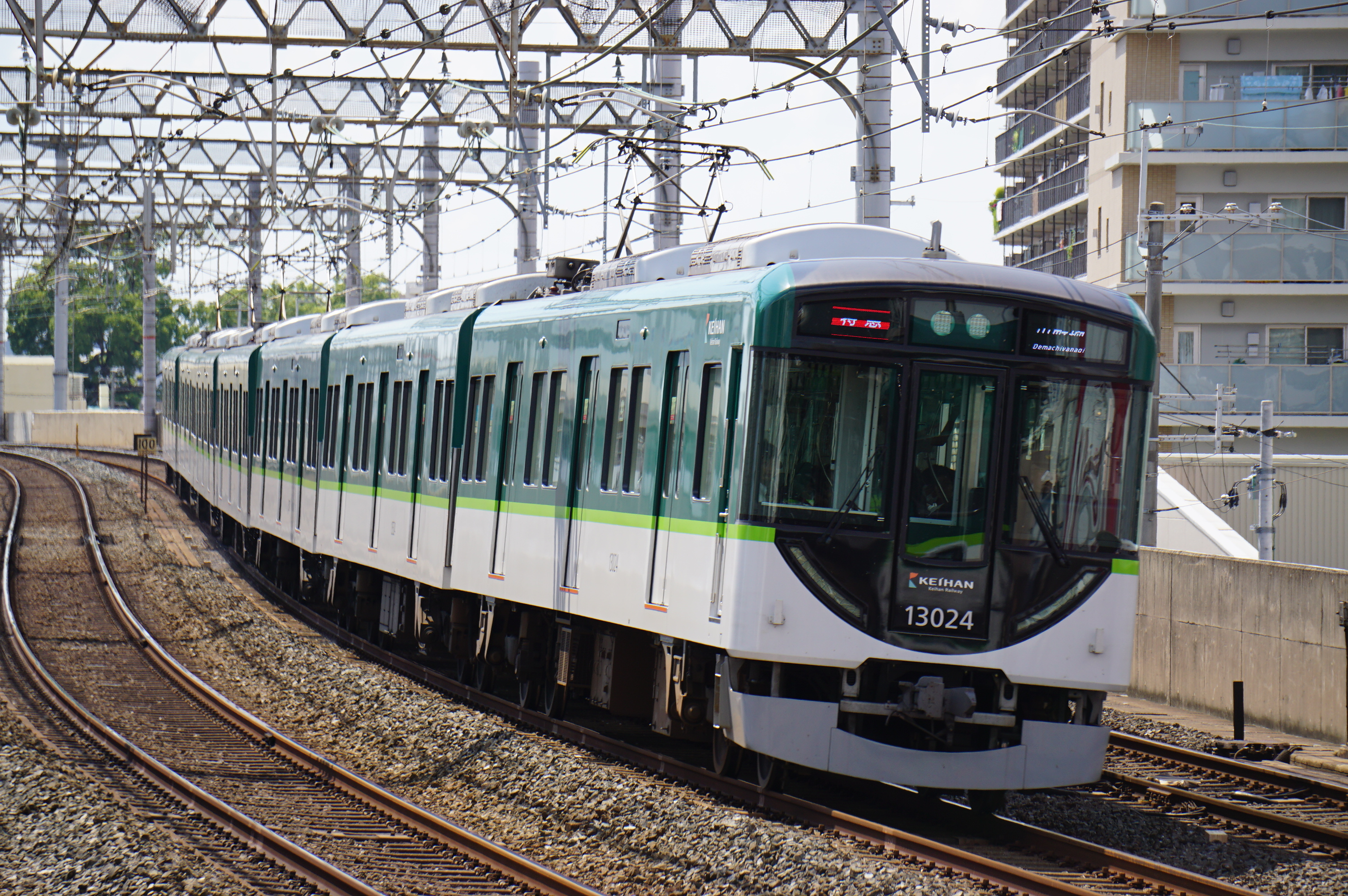
7-car set 13024

== History ==
The first set, 13001, was delivered from the Kawasaki Heavy Industries factory in Kobe to Keihan's Neyagawa Depot in March 2012. It entered service on 14 April 2012. The second set, 13002, entered revenue service on 30 May 2012.

From 9 June 2012, 13000 series sets were also introduced on the Keihan Katano Line.

The first second-batch set, 13006, entered service on 7 April 2014, followed by two 7-car sets, 13021 and 13022, which entered service in May 2014.

The fleet began operation on the Keihan Main Line on 30 May 2014.

The third batch of sets was delivered between 2016 and 2017.

Two 7-car sets were delivered in fiscal 2018.

Fifth-batch 6-car sets built in 2021 were introduced to replace the ageing 5000 series fleet. They feature onboard security cameras from new.

In February 2023, set 13024 returned to service fitted with an experimental, silicon carbide-MOSFET-based traction system power module developed by Toyo Denki. It was concluded that when compared to the conventional IGBT power module, the experimental module produced up to 44% less heat, allowing for smaller and lighter cooling apparatus.

Beginning in June 2023, spare 3000 series cars made redundant through the introduction of "Premium cars" were reclassified as 13000 series cars and inserted into existing 13000 sets, replacing an original 13000 series car in the process. As of June 2023, the spare cars retain their longitudinal seating layout. The first set to receive a replacement car was set 13021, followed by 13023 the following month.

In October 2024, Keihan announced plans to procure 67 additional 13000 series cars by fiscal 2026.

== Fleet history ==
The build history for the fleet is as shown below. All sets were manufactured by Kawasaki Heavy Industries.

| Set No. | Date delivered | Remarks |
|---|---|---|
| 13001 | 26 March 2012 | First batch |
| 13002 | 25 May 2012 | First batch |
| 13003 | 8 June 2012 | First batch |
| 13004 | 26 June 2012 | First batch |
| 13005 | 10 July 2012 | First batch |
| 13006 | 19 March 2014 | Second batch |
| 13021 | 23 April 2014 | Second batch |
| 13022 | 24 July 2014 | Second batch |
| 13007 | 2016 | Third batch |
| 13023 | 2016 | Third batch |
| 13024 | 2016 | Third batch |
| 13025 | 2017 | Third batch |
| (14 cars) | 2018 | Fourth batch |
| (36 cars) | 2021 | Fifth batch |
| (18 cars) | Fiscal 2024–2025 (planned) | Sixth batch |
| (49 cars) | Fiscal 2025–2026 (planned) | Seventh batch |
