= Keihan 3000 series =

Japanese electric multiple unit train type

Keihan 3000 series Comfort Saloon
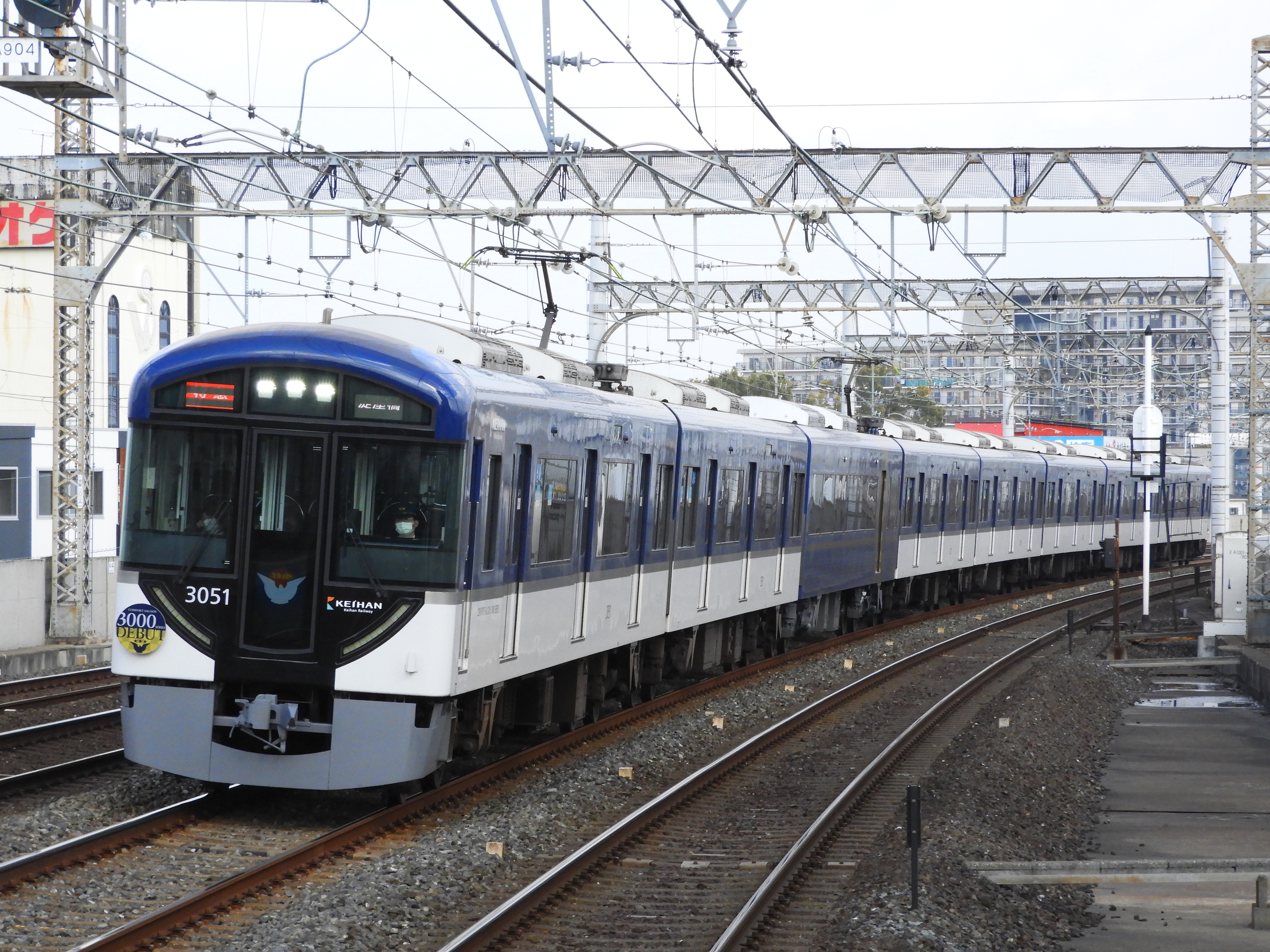
- Set 3001 in February 2021
- In service: 2008–present
- Manufacturer: Kawasaki Heavy Industries
- Built at: Hyōgo
- Constructed: 2008; 2020 (Premium Car)
- Entered service: 19 October 2008; 31 January 2021 (Premium Car)
- Number under construction: 6 vehicles
- Number built: 54 vehicles (6 sets)
- Number in service: 48 vehicles (6 sets) (6 vehicles transferred for 13000 series)
- Formation: 8 cars per trainset
- Fleet numbers: 3001–3006
- Operator: Keihan Electric Railway
- Lines served: Keihan Main Line; Keihan Ōtō Line

Specifications
- Car body construction: Aluminum alloy
- Doors: 3 pairs per side 1 pair per side (Premium Car)
- Maximum speed: 110 km/h (70 mph)
- Traction system: Variable frequency (IGBT)
- Electric systems: 1,500 V DC overhead catenary
- Current collection: Single-arm pantograph
- Bogies: KW-77E (motored); FS577 (trailer)
- Safety system: Keihan ATS
- Track gauge: 1,435 mm (4 ft 8 1/2 in)

The Keihan 3000 series (京阪3000系, Keihan 3000-kei) is an electric multiple unit (EMU) limited express train type operated by the private railway operator Keihan Electric Railway in Japan since 2008.

== Formations ==
As of 1 April 2016, the fleet consists of six eight-car trains (3001 to 3006), formed as follows with three motored ("M") cars and five non-powered trailer ("T") cars.

=== As built (October 2008 – January 2021) ===
	← Sanjō / Demachiyanagi Yodoyabashi →							
Designation	3000 (Mc1)	3500 (T1)	3600 (T2)	3700 (T3)	3150 (M)	3550 (T4)	3750 (T5)	3050 (Mc2)
Numbering	3001 ∥ 3006	3501 ∥ 3506	3601 ∥ 3606	3701 ∥ 3706	3151 ∥ 3156	3551 ∥ 3556	3751 ∥ 3756	3051 ∥ 3056

=== Sets with a Premium Car (January 2021 – present) ===
Sets with a Premium Car are formed as follows.

	← Sanjō / Demachiyanagi Yodoyabashi →							
Designation	3000 (Mc1)	3500 (T1)	3600 (T2)	3700 (T3)	3150 (M)	3850 (T4)	3550 (T5)	3050 (Mc2)
Numbering	3001 ∥ 3006	3501 ∥ 3506	3601 ∥ 3606	3701 ∥ 3706	3151 ∥ 3156	3851 ∥ 3856	3551 ∥ 3556	3051 ∥ 3056

The Mc and M cars are each equipped with one single-arm pantograph.

== Interior ==
=== Standard cars ===
Passenger accommodation consists of 2+1 abreast transverse seating, with longitudinal seating at the car ends. Each car has priority seating and a wheelchair space. LCD information displays are featured above each door.

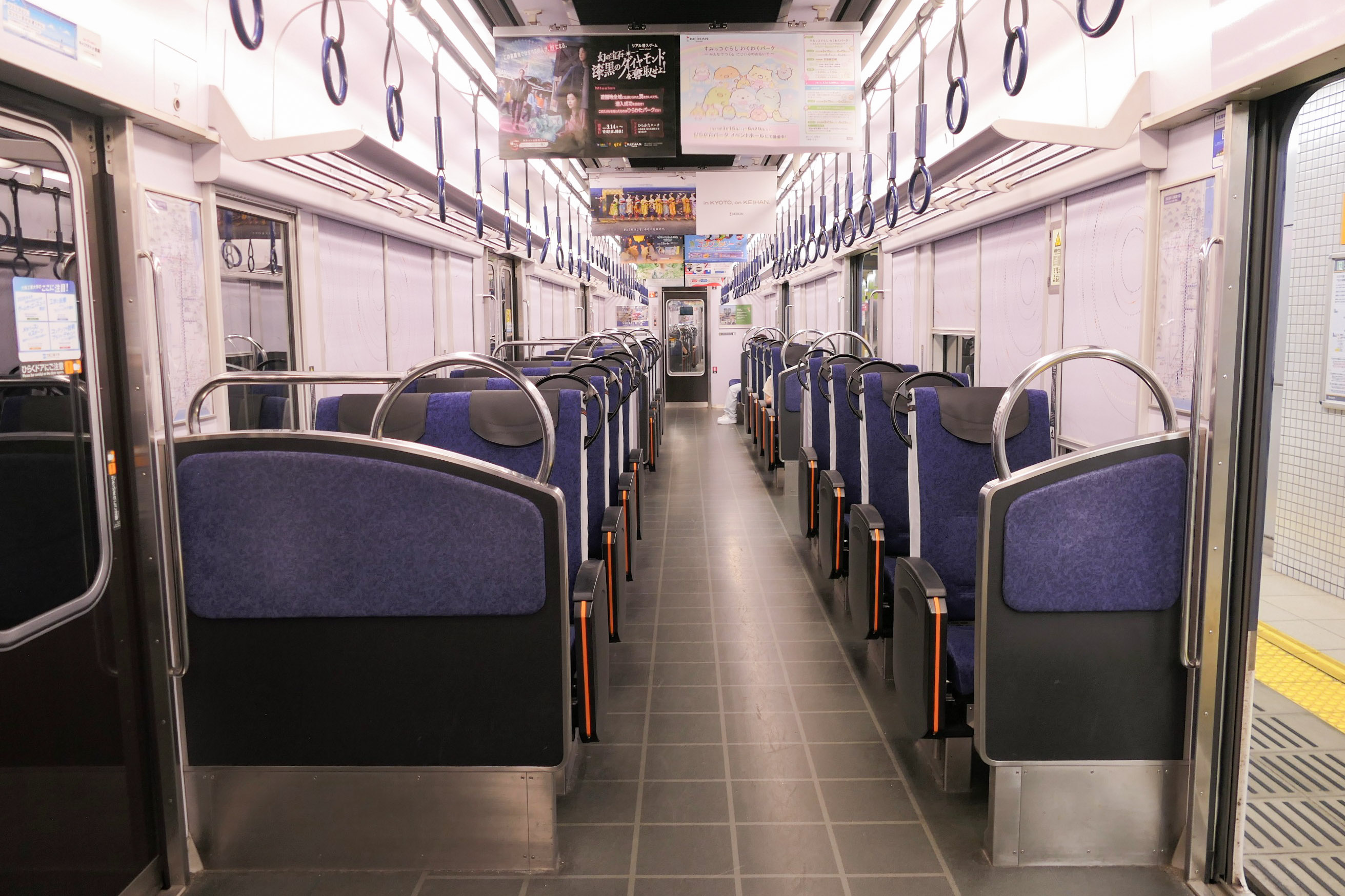
Interior

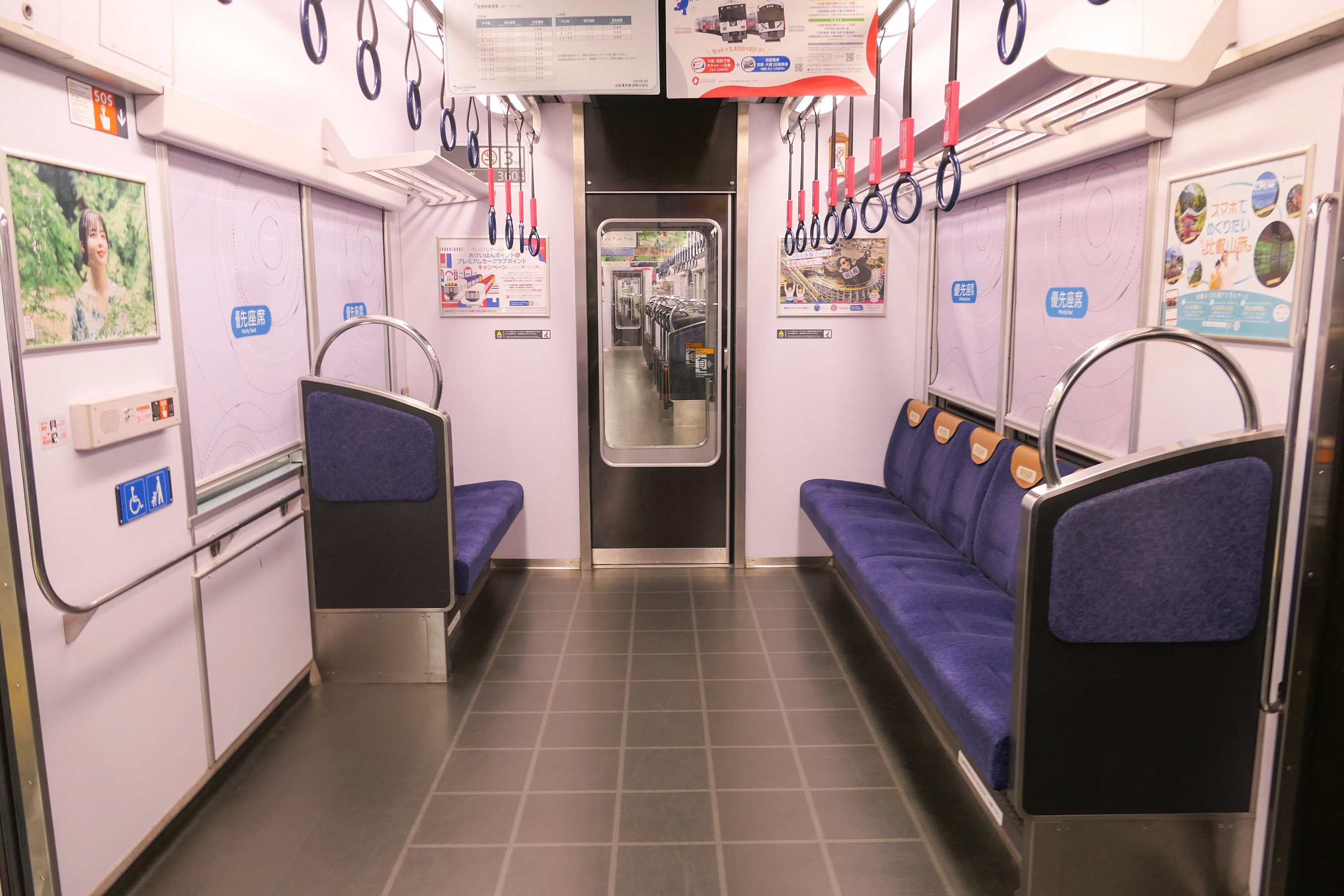
Wheelchair space at left

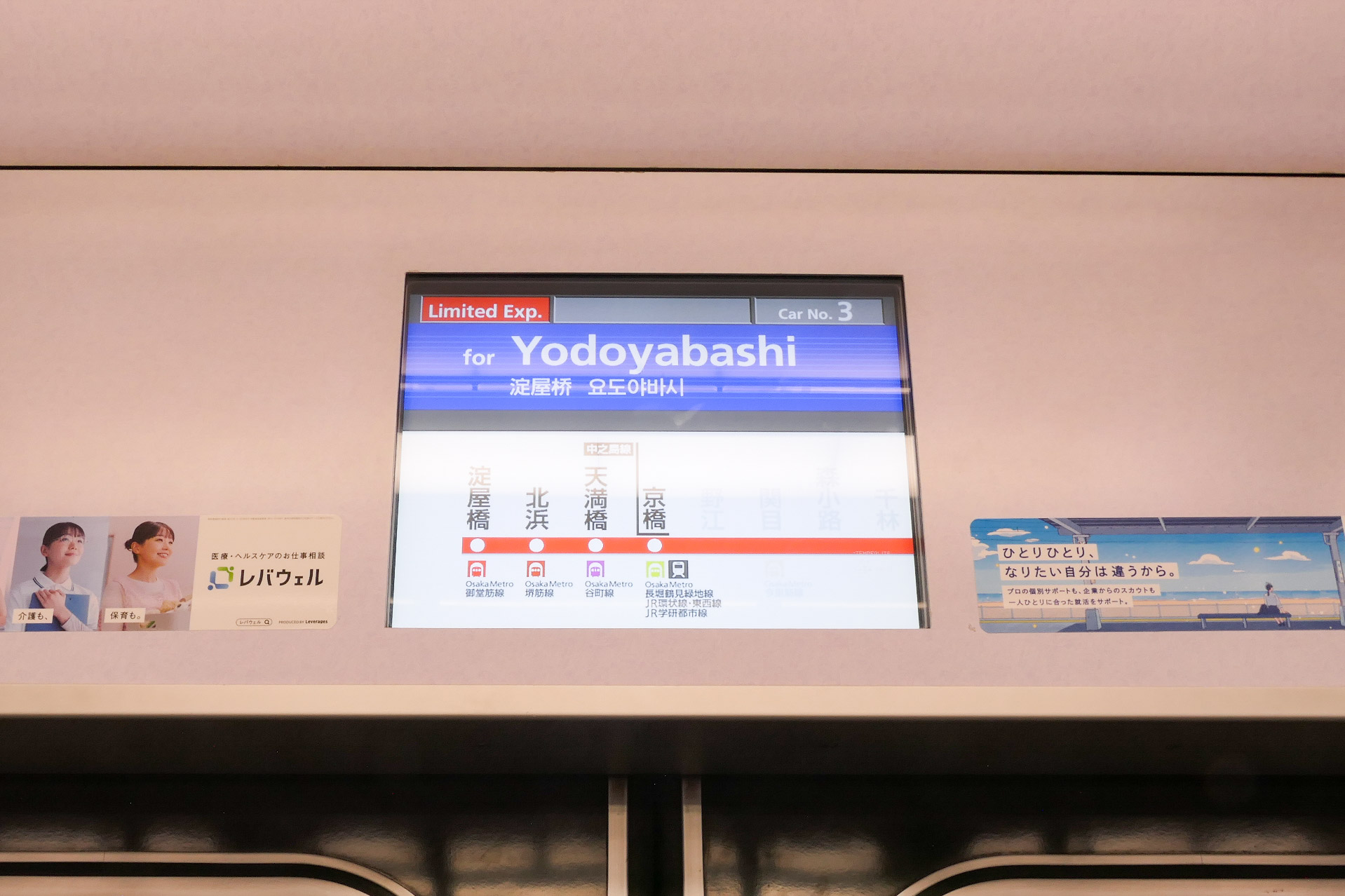
LCD information display

=== Premium Car ===
Passenger accommodation for the Premium Car consists of twelve rows of 2+1 abreast reclining seats, and four additional reclining seats, for a total of 40 seats. Wheelchair accommodation is provided.

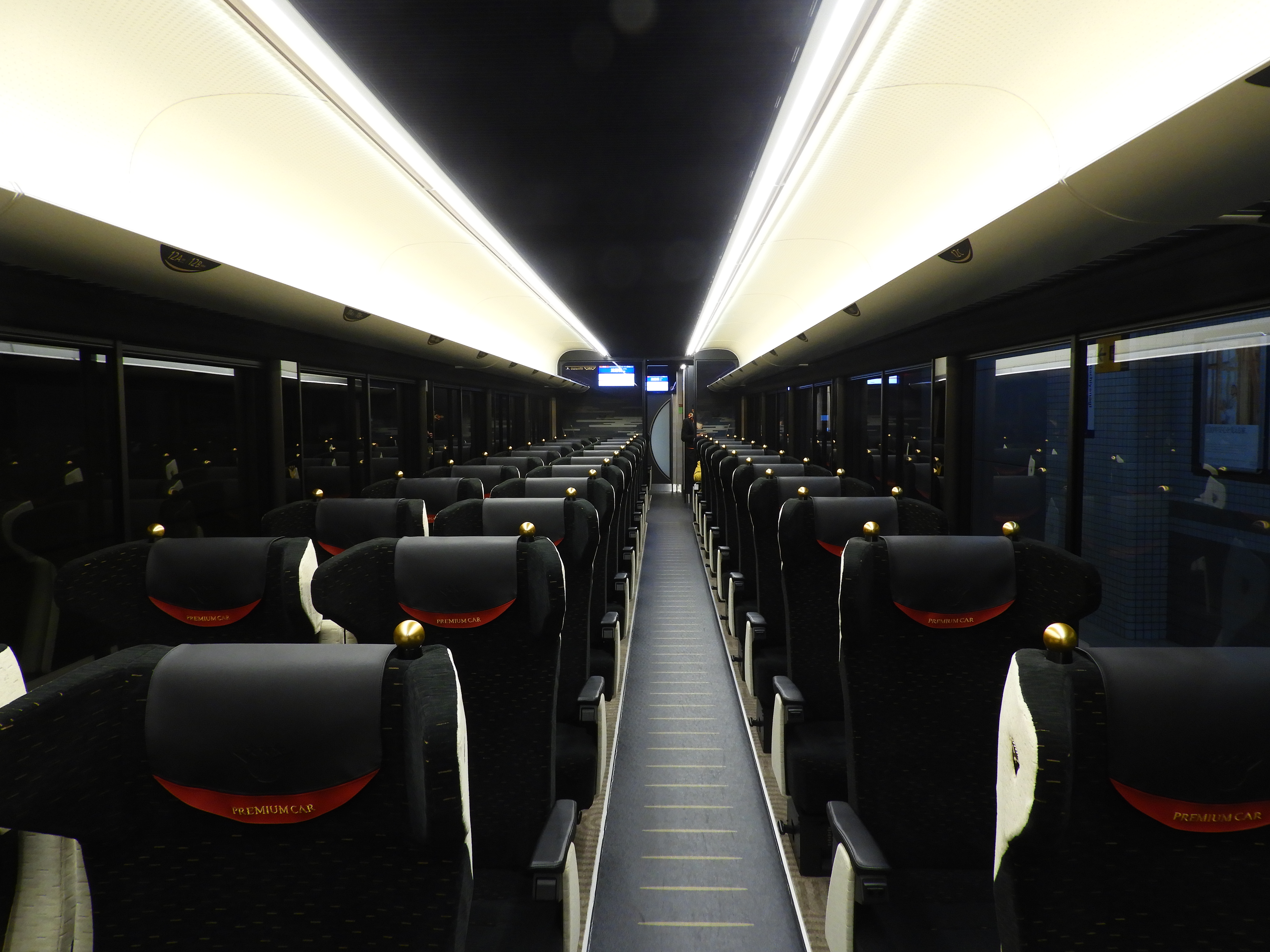
Interior view of a Premium Car

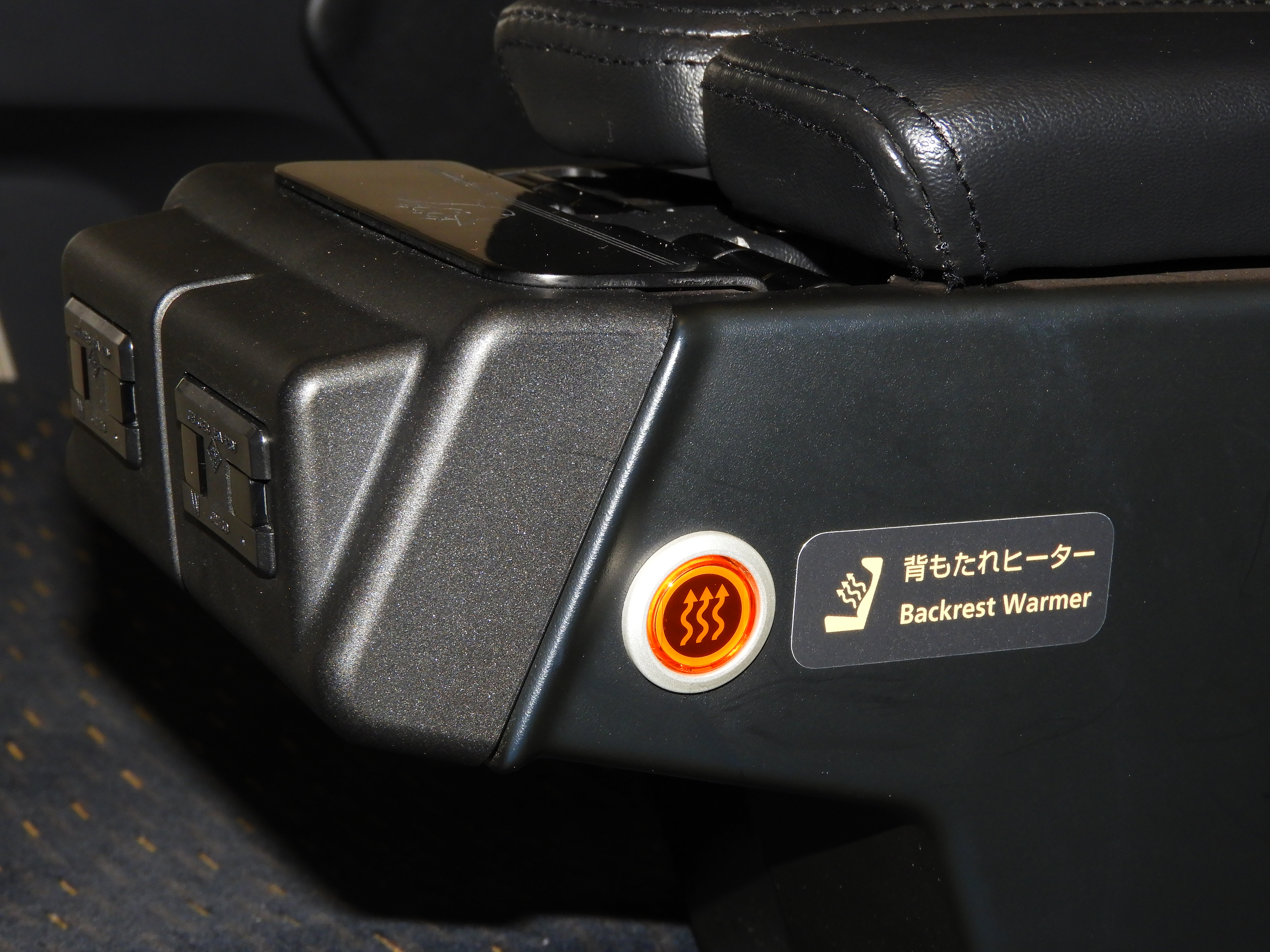
Backrest warmer button

== History ==
The 3000 series trains were introduced into service on 19 October 2008, coinciding with the opening of the Keihan Nakanoshima Line. It was initially used on most service patterns, but later was redeployed on limited express services.

The trains received the Laurel Prize in 2009.

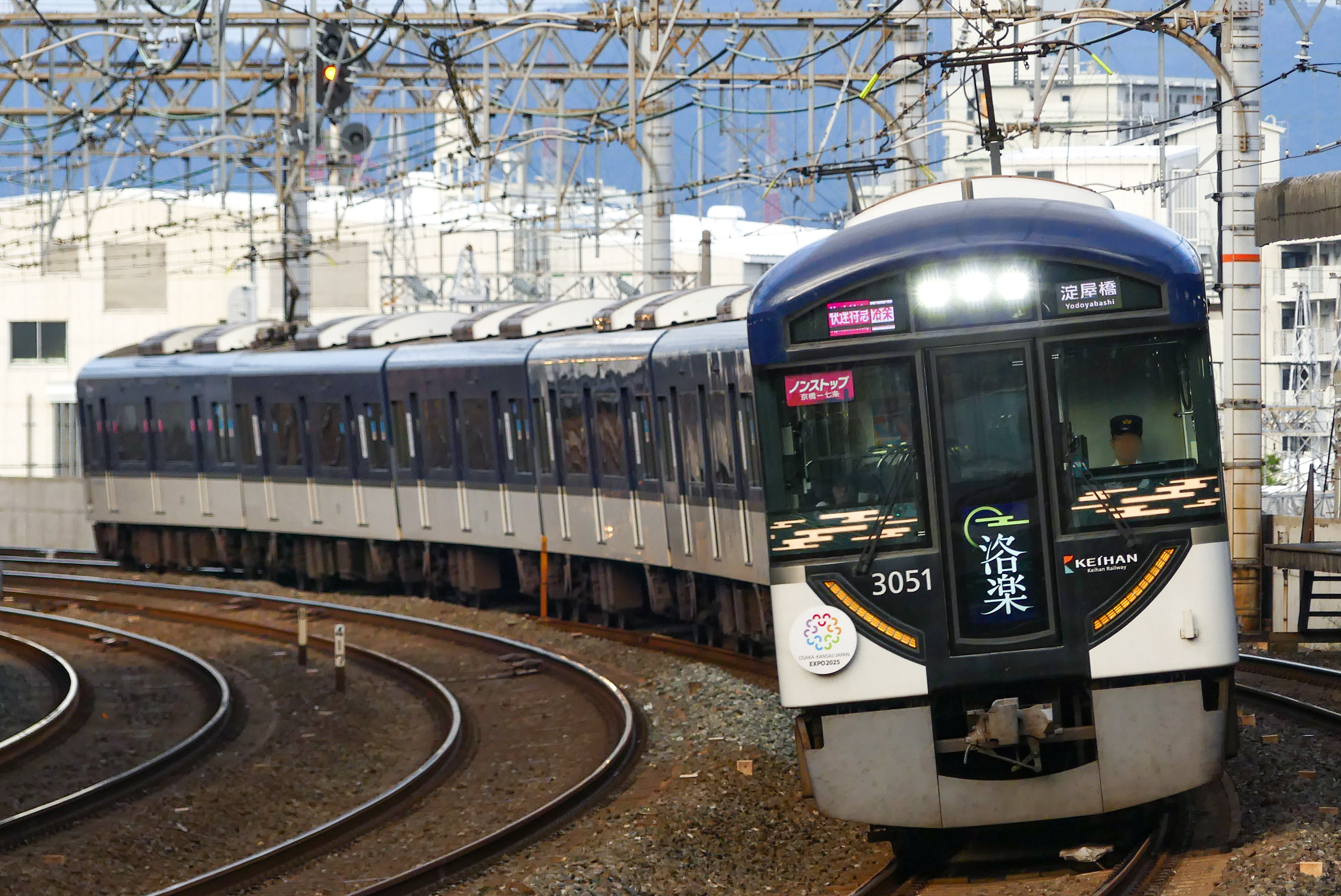
Set 3001 in September 2018

=== Premium Car introduction ===
From 31 January 2021, all sets' sixth cars were replaced in service with newly built Premium Cars at a total cost of ¥1.2 billion (US$10.93 million). The new cars allow premium services to be provided on all daytime express trains. While the outgoing cars' future was undecided at the time, it was confirmed that they will not be scrapped. In June 2023, outgoing car 3751 was renumbered 13871 and inserted into 13000 series set 13021, replacing car 13771 of that set. The following month saw car 3753 renumbered to 13873 and inserted into set 13023.

The 3000 series' Premium Cars share some attributes with those of the 8000 series fleet, such as the golden passenger door on each side and Nanoe X air purifiers. However, they feature a seat pitch of 1,040 millimeters (41 in), a 20-millimeter (4/5 in) increase over those of the 8000 series. They also feature compact "Infoverre Window Series Bar Type" external LCD destination displays.

The introduction of the Premium Cars led to the 3000 series receiving the Laurel Prize again in 2022, with the Japan Railfan Club citing the cars' "high degree of perfection".

On 18 August 2025, Keihan announced its plans to introduce additional Premium Cars across its 3000 series fleet from the start of the revised timetable on 26 October of that year. The new-build cars are planned to replace each set's fifth car.

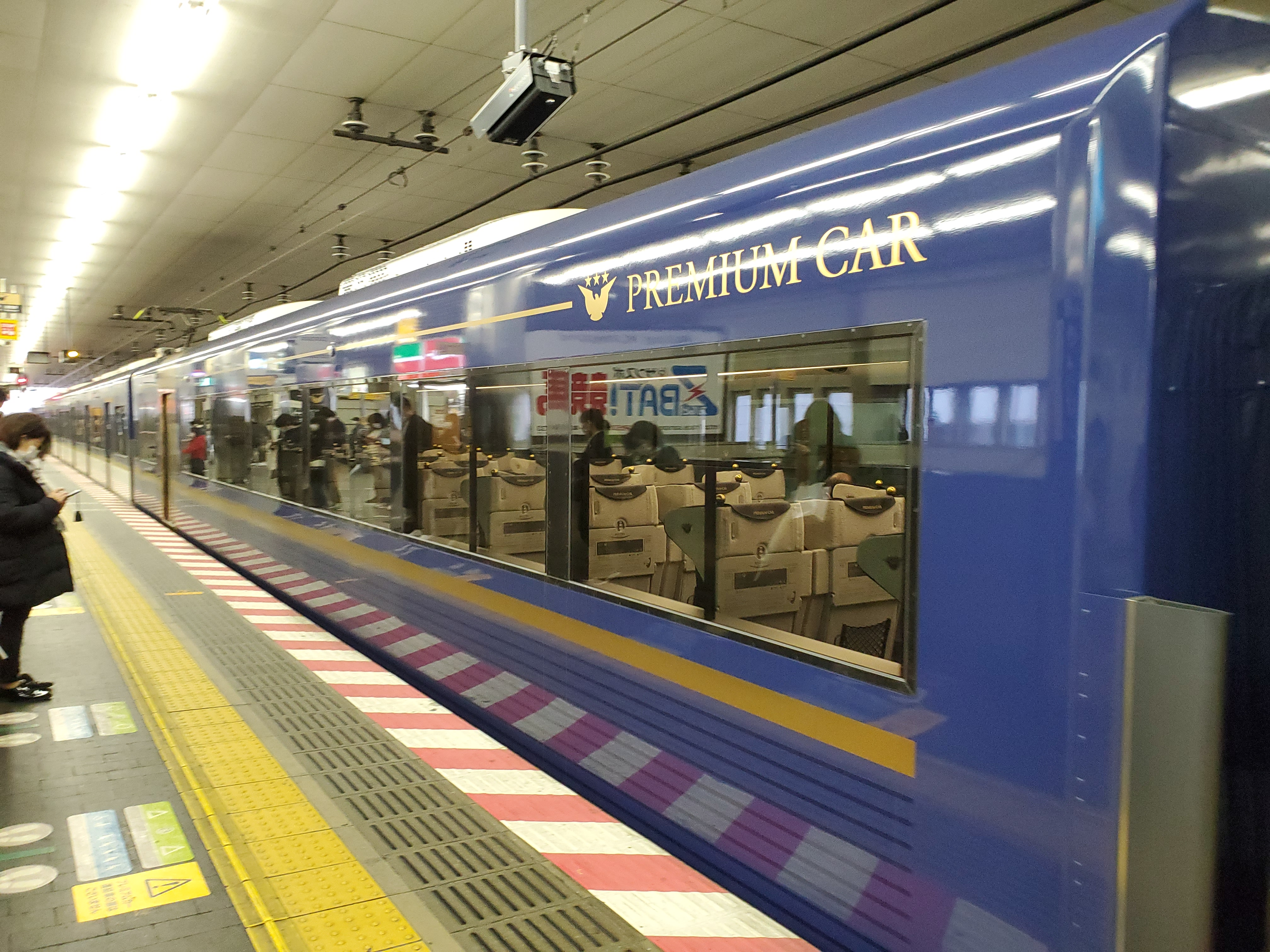
A 3000 series Premium Car, February 2021

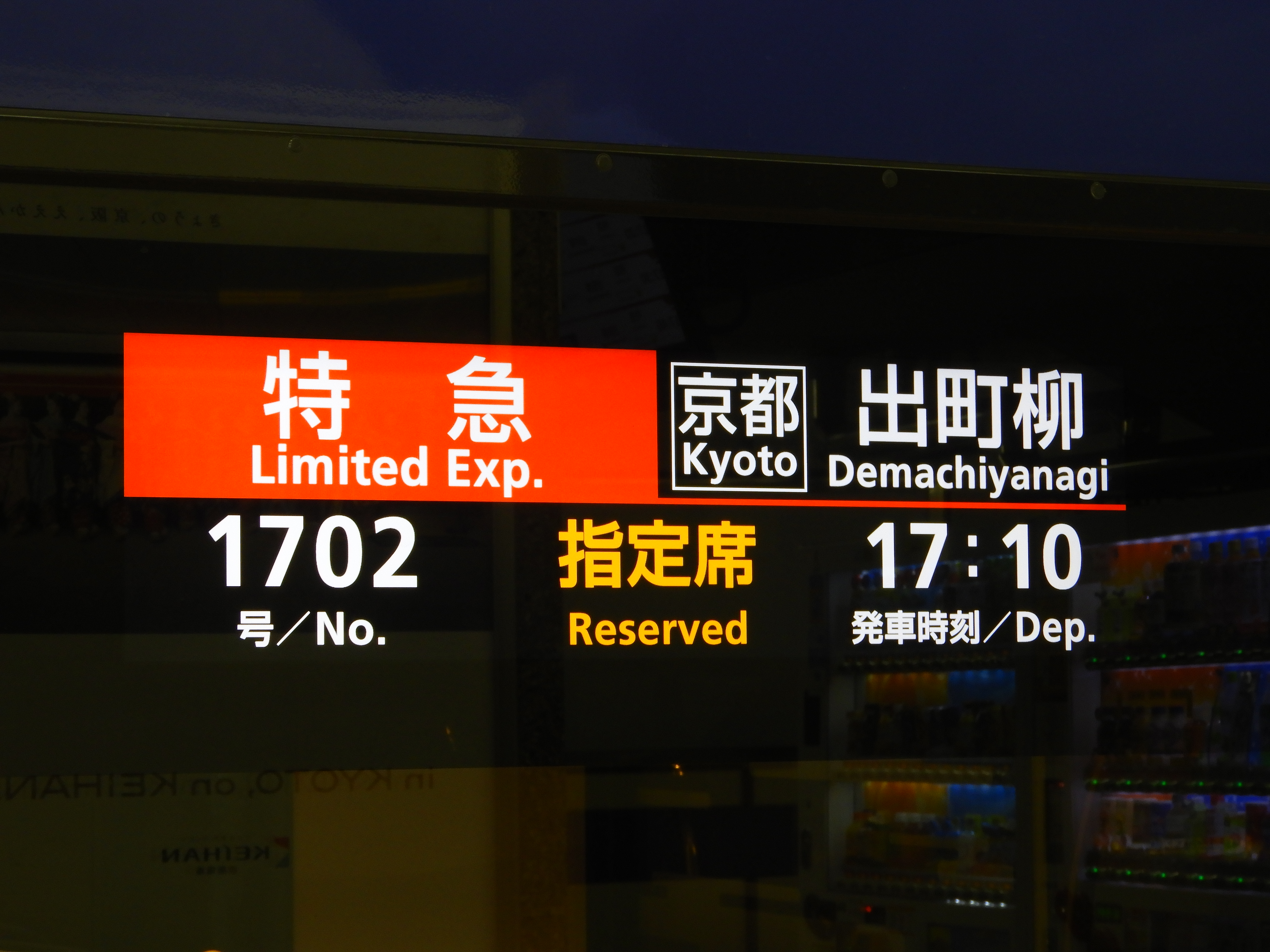
"Infoverre" external destination display
