= Keihan 8000 series =

Japanese electric multiple unit train type

Keihan 8000 series Elegant Saloon
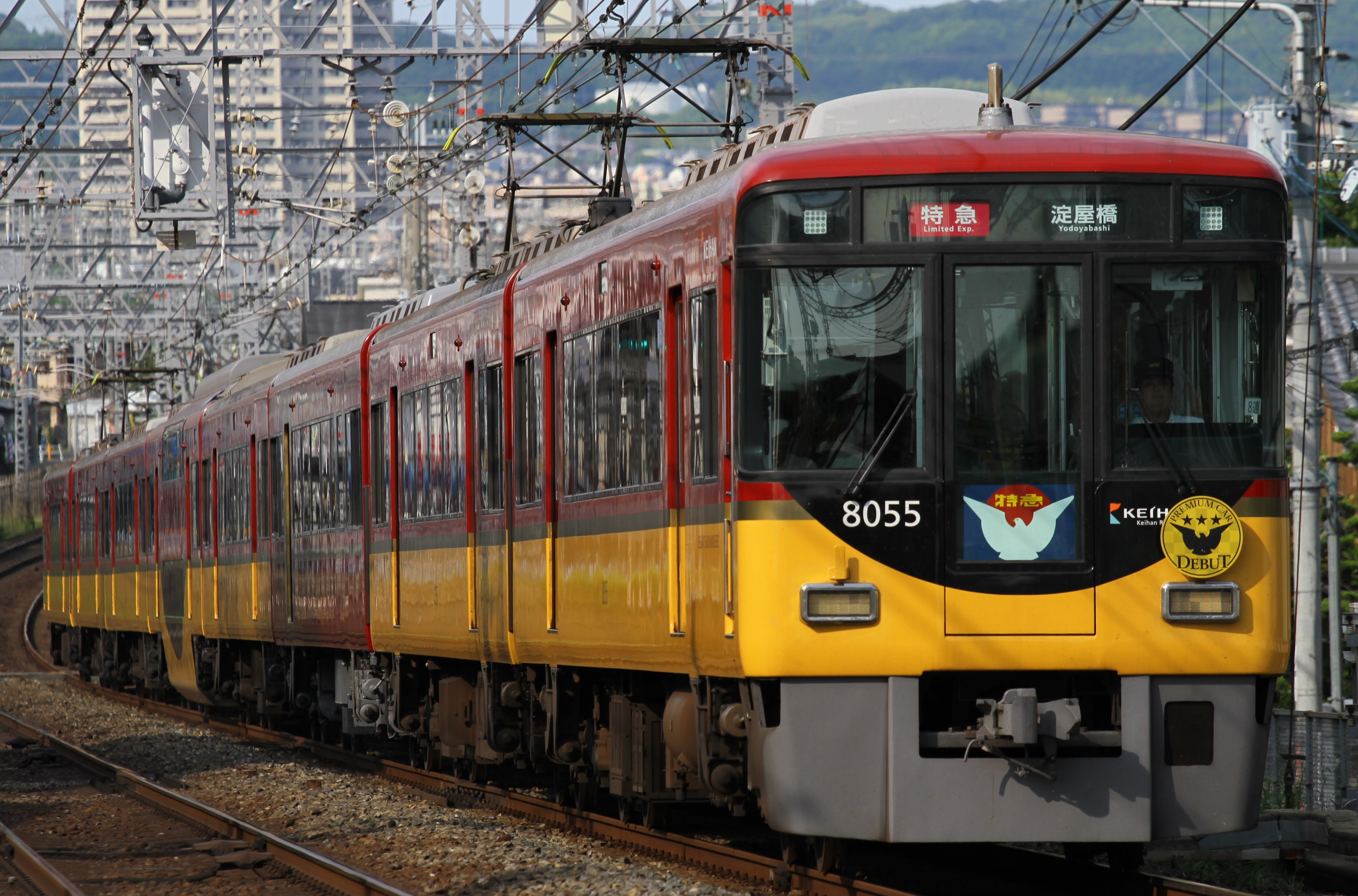
- Set 8005 on the Keihan Main Line in August 2017
- Manufacturer: Kawasaki Heavy Industries
- Built at: Kobe
- Family name: TV Car (1989–2012); Elegant Saloon
- Replaced: 3000 series
- Constructed: 1989–1990
- Entered service: 5 October 1989
- Refurbished: 2010–2012, 2018–
- Number built: 80 vehicles (10 sets)
- Number in service: 80 vehicles (10 sets)
- Formation: 8 cars per trainset
- Fleet numbers: 8001–8010
- Operator: Keihan Electric Railway
- Lines served: Keihan Main Line; Keihan Ōtō Line

Specifications
- Car body construction: Aluminium alloy; Steel (Type 8800 bilevel car)
- Car length: 18 m (59 ft 1 in)
- Height: 4,155 mm (13 ft 7.6 in)
- Doors: 2 per side; 1 per side (Type 8550 "Premium Car")
- Maximum speed: 110 km/h (70 mph)
- Traction system: Field phase control
- Electric systems: 1,500 V DC overhead catenary
- Current collection: Pantograph
- Safety system: Keihan ATS
- Track gauge: 1,435 mm (4 ft 8 1/2 in) Standard Gauge

The Keihan 8000 series (京阪8000系, Keihan 8000-kei) is an electric multiple unit (EMU) limited express train type operated by the private railway operator Keihan Electric Railway in Japan since 1989.

== Formations ==
As of 1 April 2015, the fleet consists of ten eight-car trains, formed as follows with four motored ("M") cars and four non-powered trailer ("T") cars.

Car No.	1	2	3	4	5	6	7	8
Designation	Mc1	M2	T2	TD	T3	T	M1	Mc2
Numbering	8000	8100	8500	8800	8750	8550	8150	8050

- The TD car is a bilevel car.
- The MC1 and M1 cars each have two scissors-type pantographs.

== Interior ==
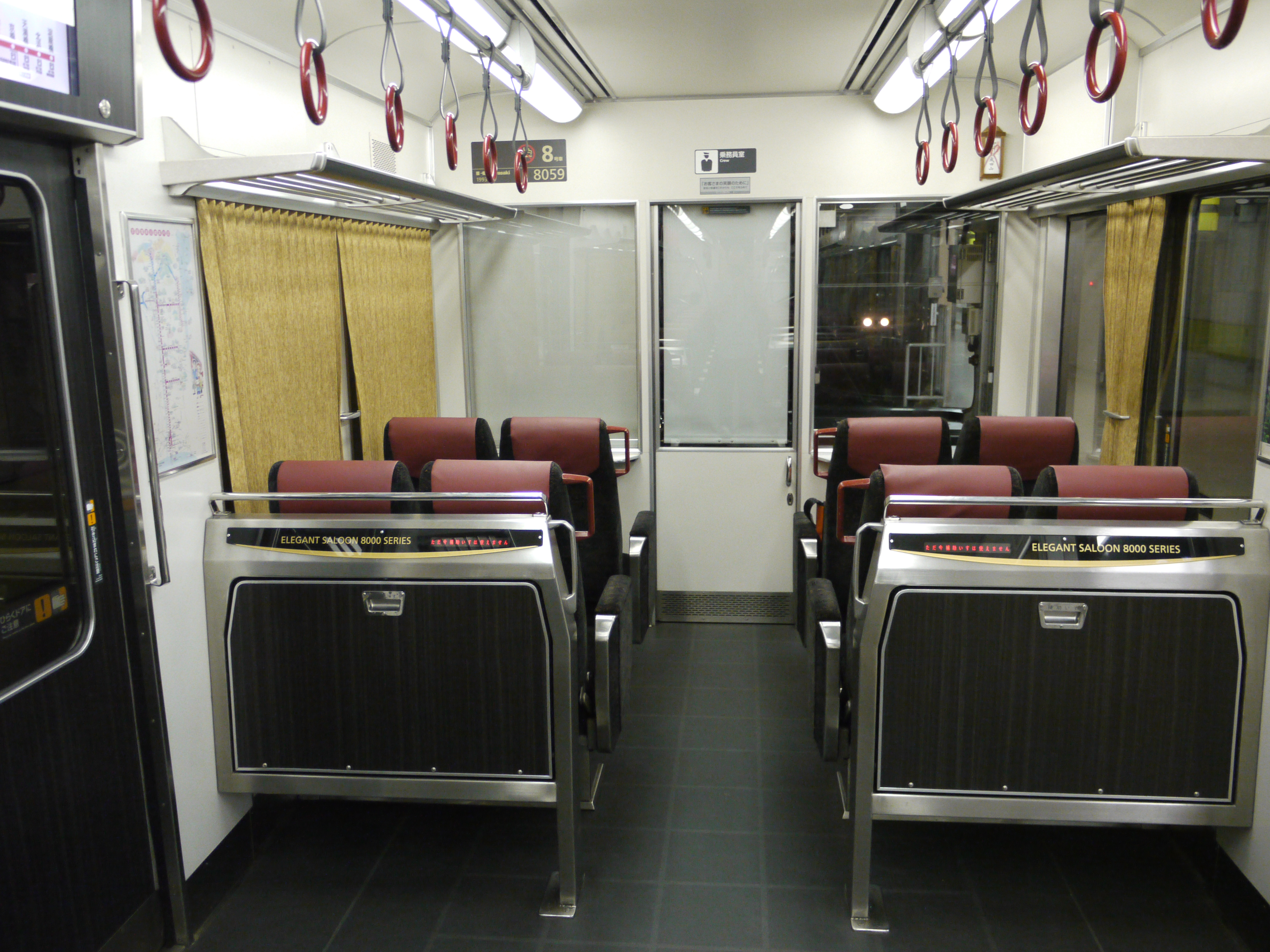
The interior of driving car 8059 in September 2014

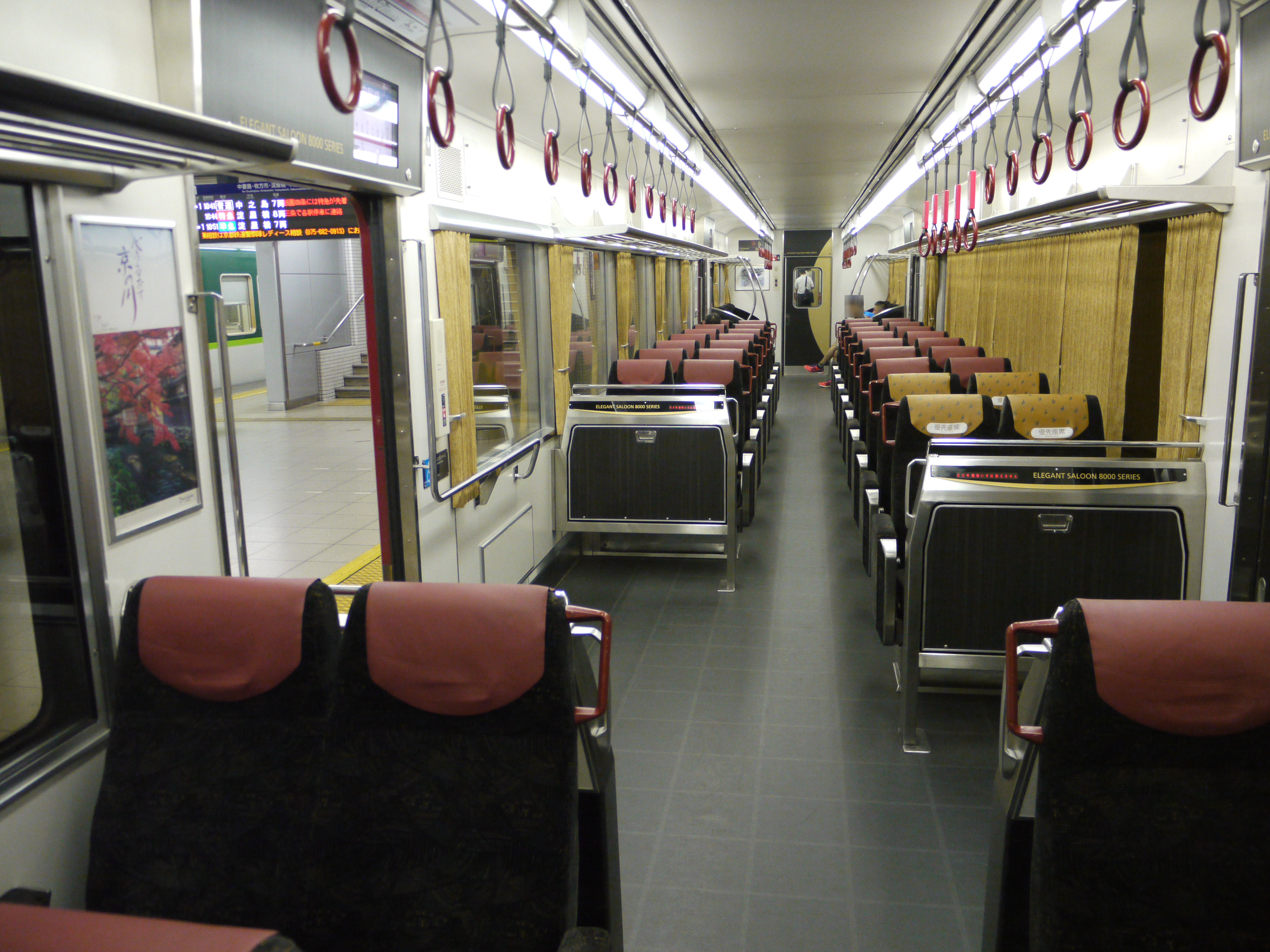
The interior of driving car 8059 in September 2014

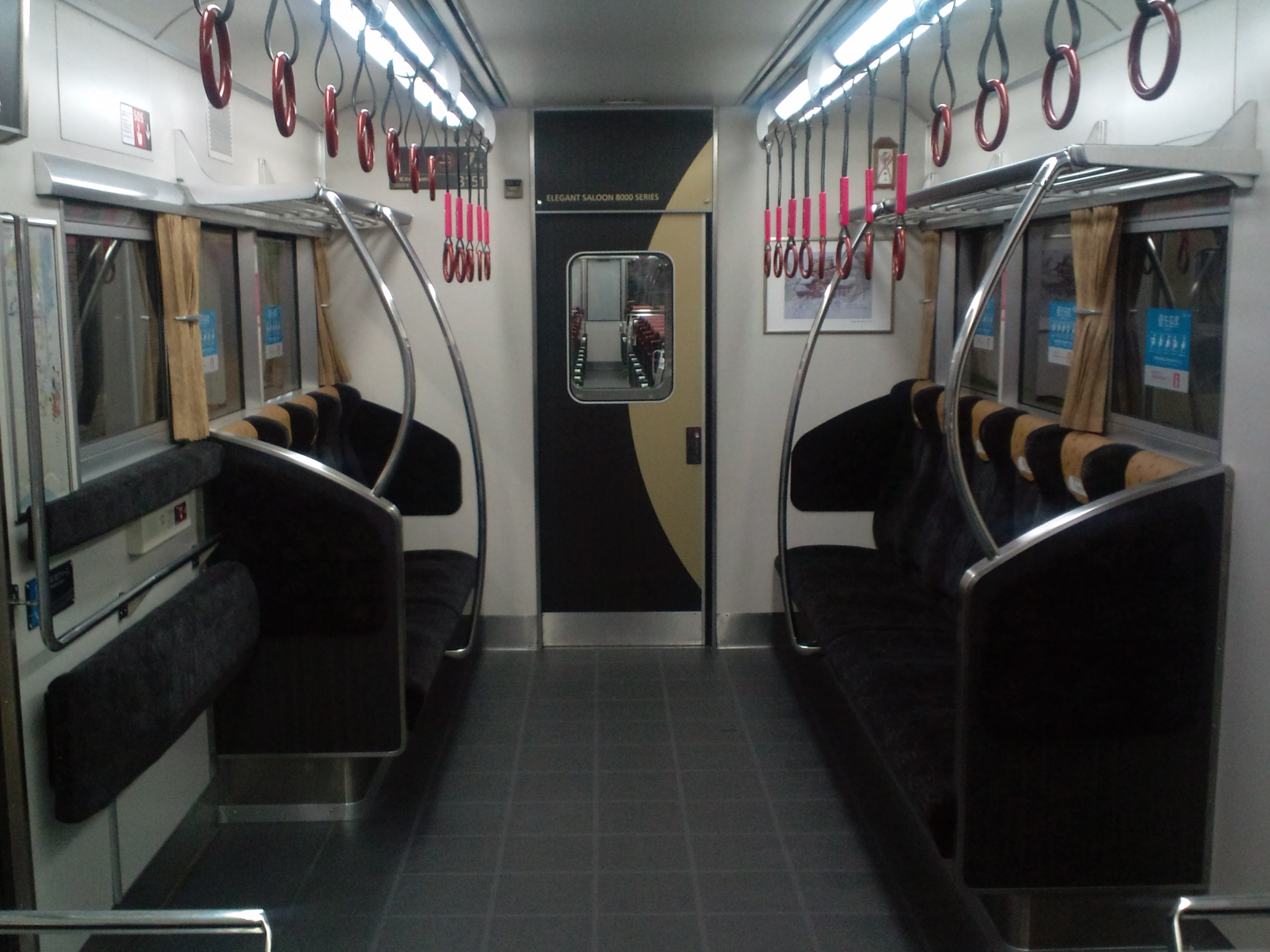
Priority seating and a wheelchair space in car 8151 in March 2011

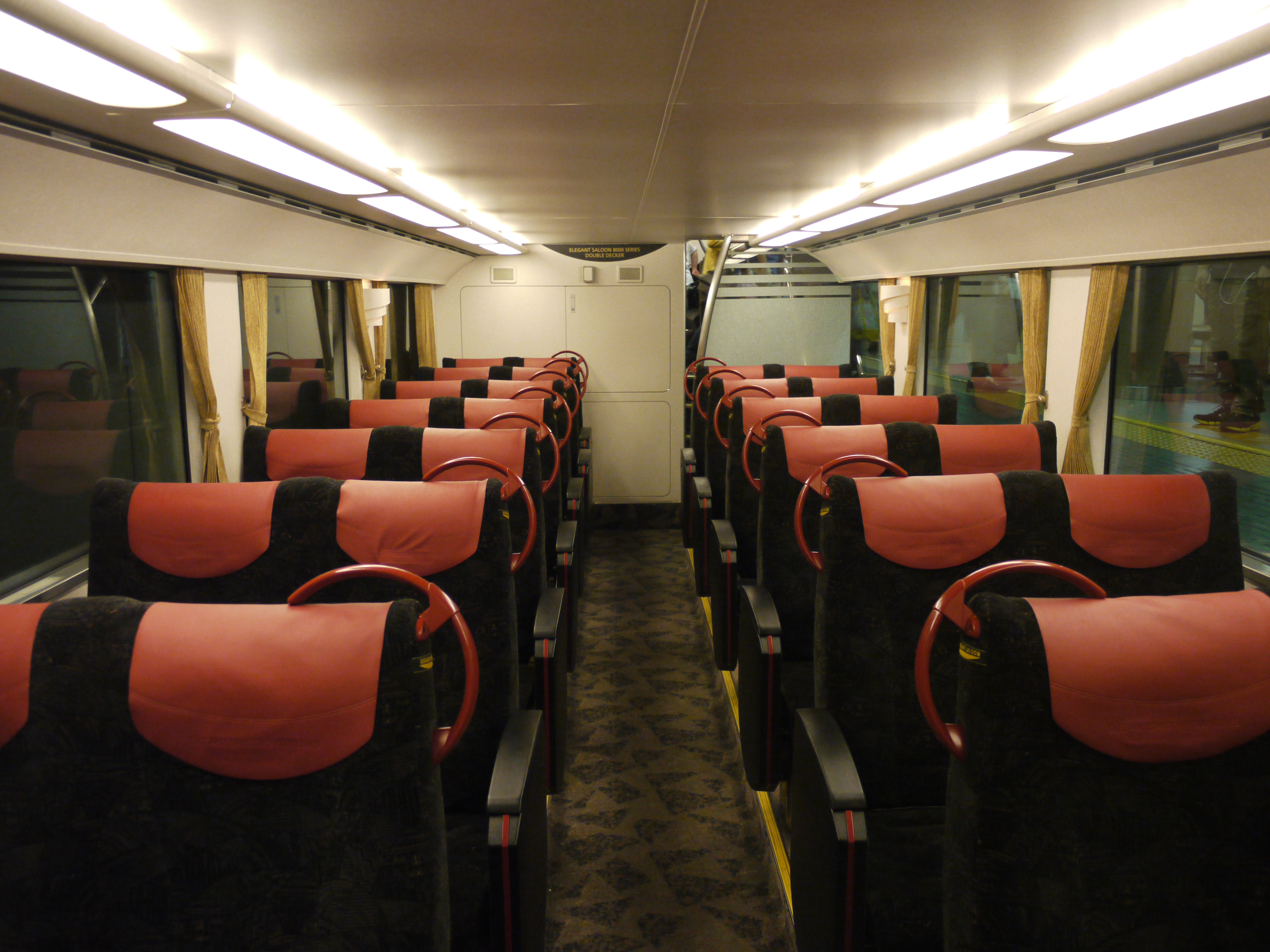
The lower deck of a type 8800 bilevel car in July 2014

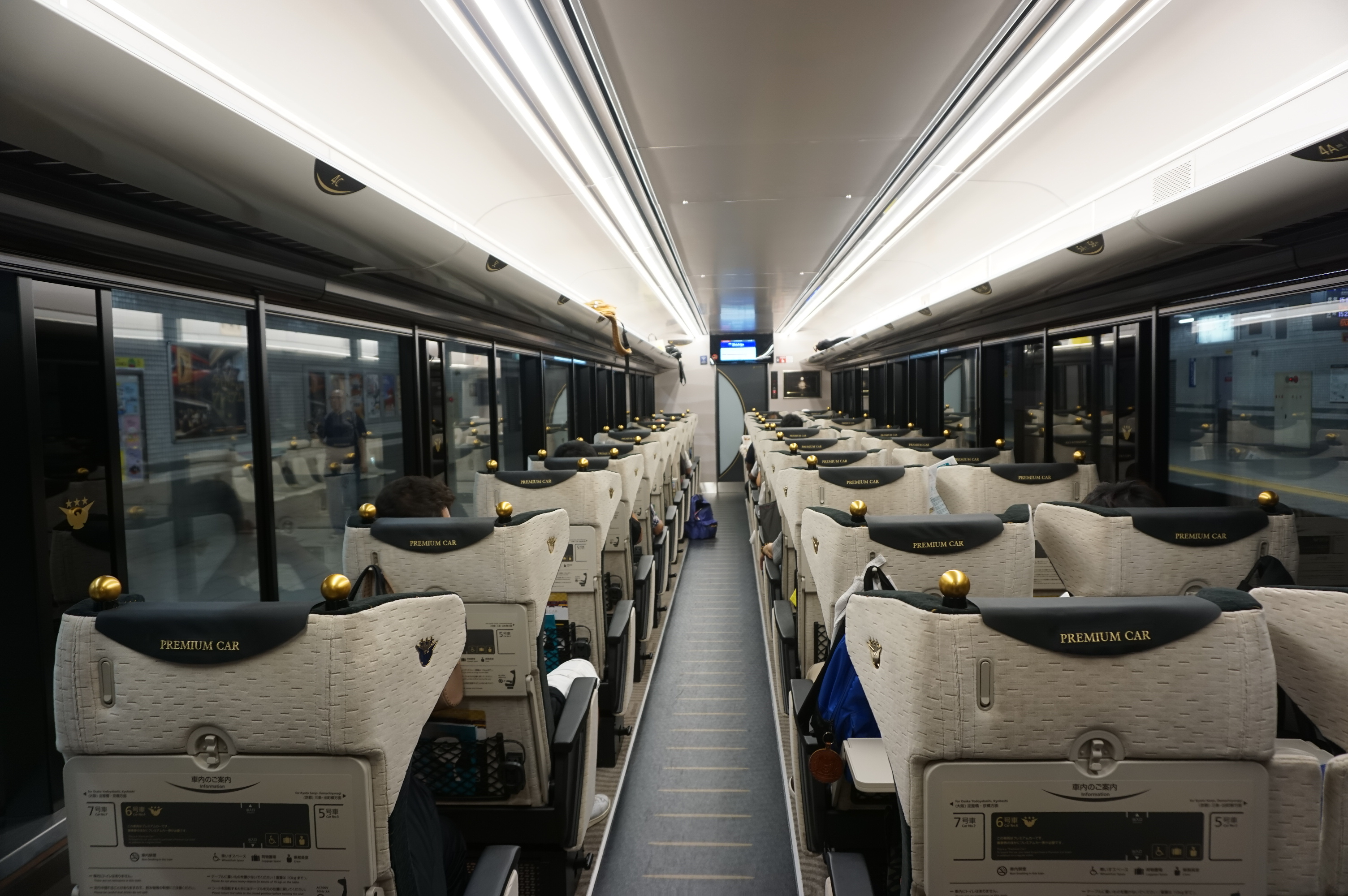
The interior of "Premium Car" 8551 in August 2017

== History ==
The 8000 series trains were introduced between 1989 and 1990, initially operating as seven-car sets. They were lengthened to eight cars per set with the addition of a type 8800 bi-level car from fiscal 1997. Use of the bi-level car does not incur a standalone surcharge.

Between 2008 and 2010, the fleet was repainted into a new livery.

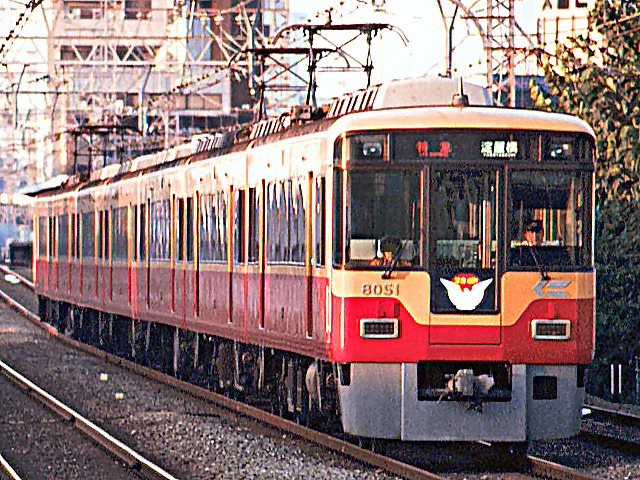
Set 8001 in original seven-car formation in 1990

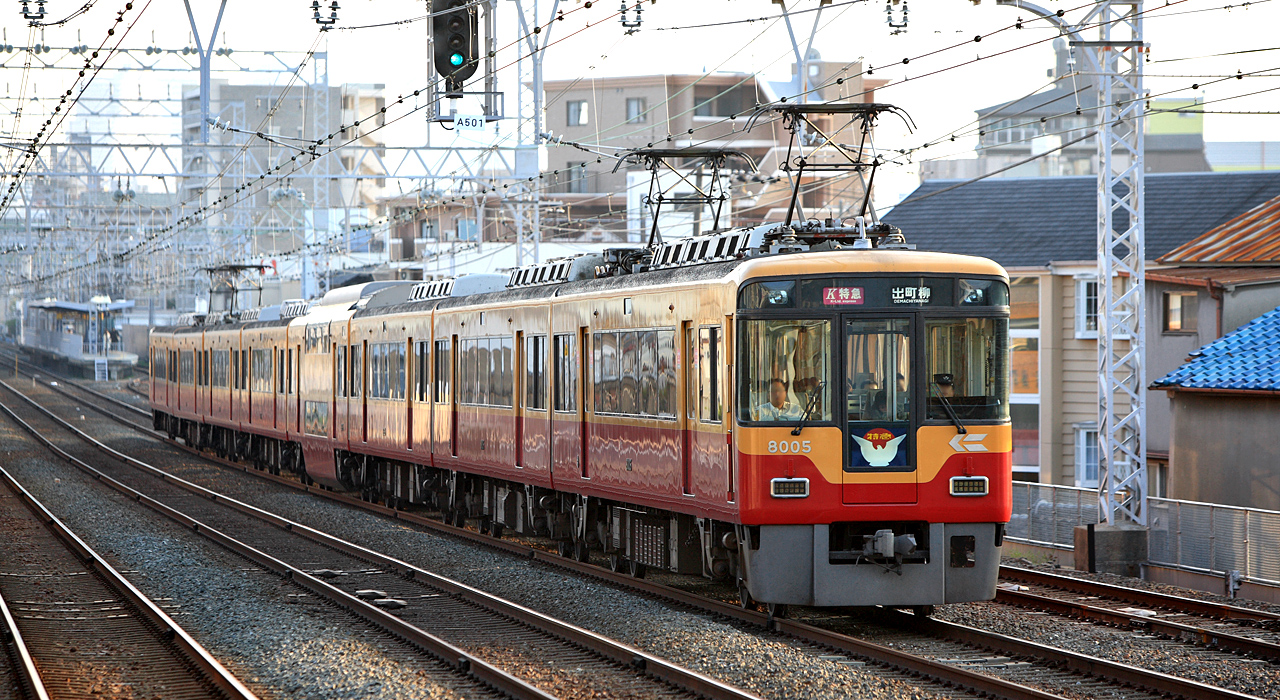
Set 8005 in the original livery in April 2008

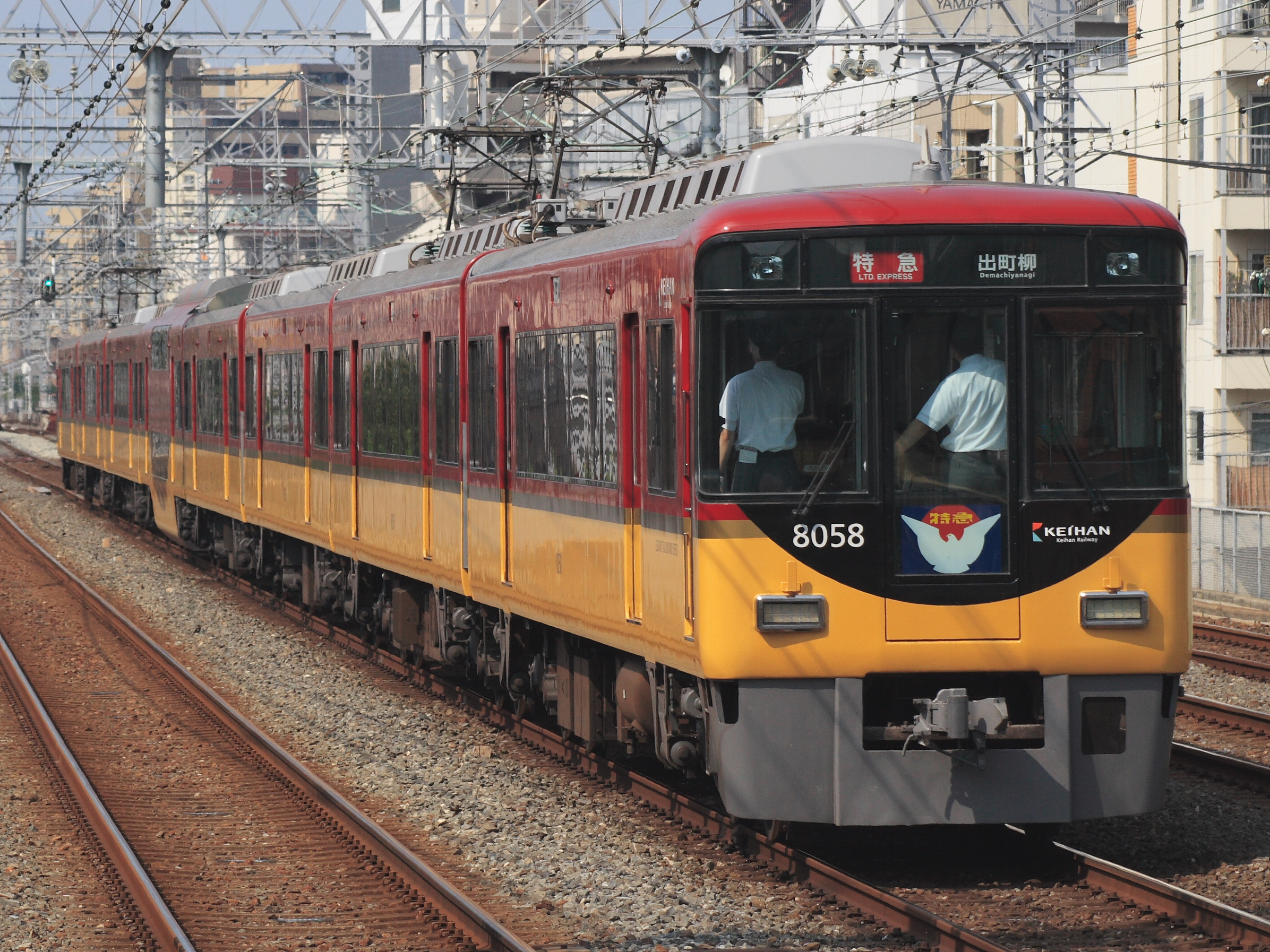
Reliveried set 8008 on the Keihan Main Line in July 2008

=== Refurbishment ===
Between March 2010 and November 2012, the fleet gradually underwent refurbishment, which also included interior changes.

Beginning in 2018, the fleet was retrofitted with LED destination displays and updated interior lighting.

=== Premium Car introduction ===
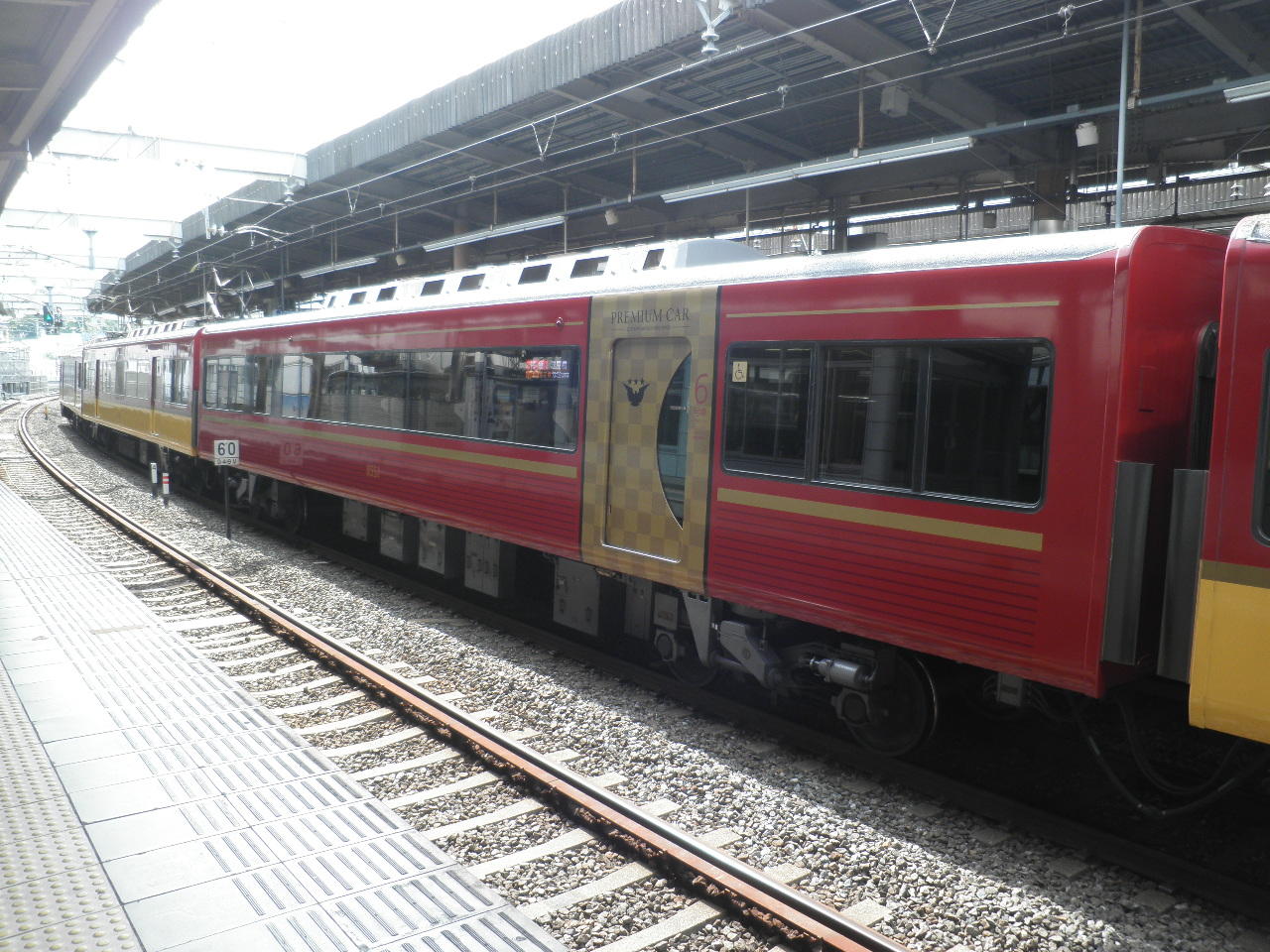
"Premium Car" exterior, September 2017

In 2017, car 6 of each set was modified to become a "Premium Car" with 2+1 abreast reclining seating ahead of the introduction of reserved-seating limited express services on 20 August 2017, which incurs a surcharge. Modifications include the elimination of one doorway on each side. Seating accommodation is provided for 40 passengers with a seat width of 460 mm (18 in) (compared with 430 mm (17 in) for seating in other cars) and seat pitch of 1,020 mm (40 in) (compared with 920 mm (36 in) for seating in other cars). AC power outlets are provided for each seat. To accommodate the cars' modifications, the fleet was provisionally operated as seven-car sets from September 2016.
