= Keihan 5000 series =

Japanese train type

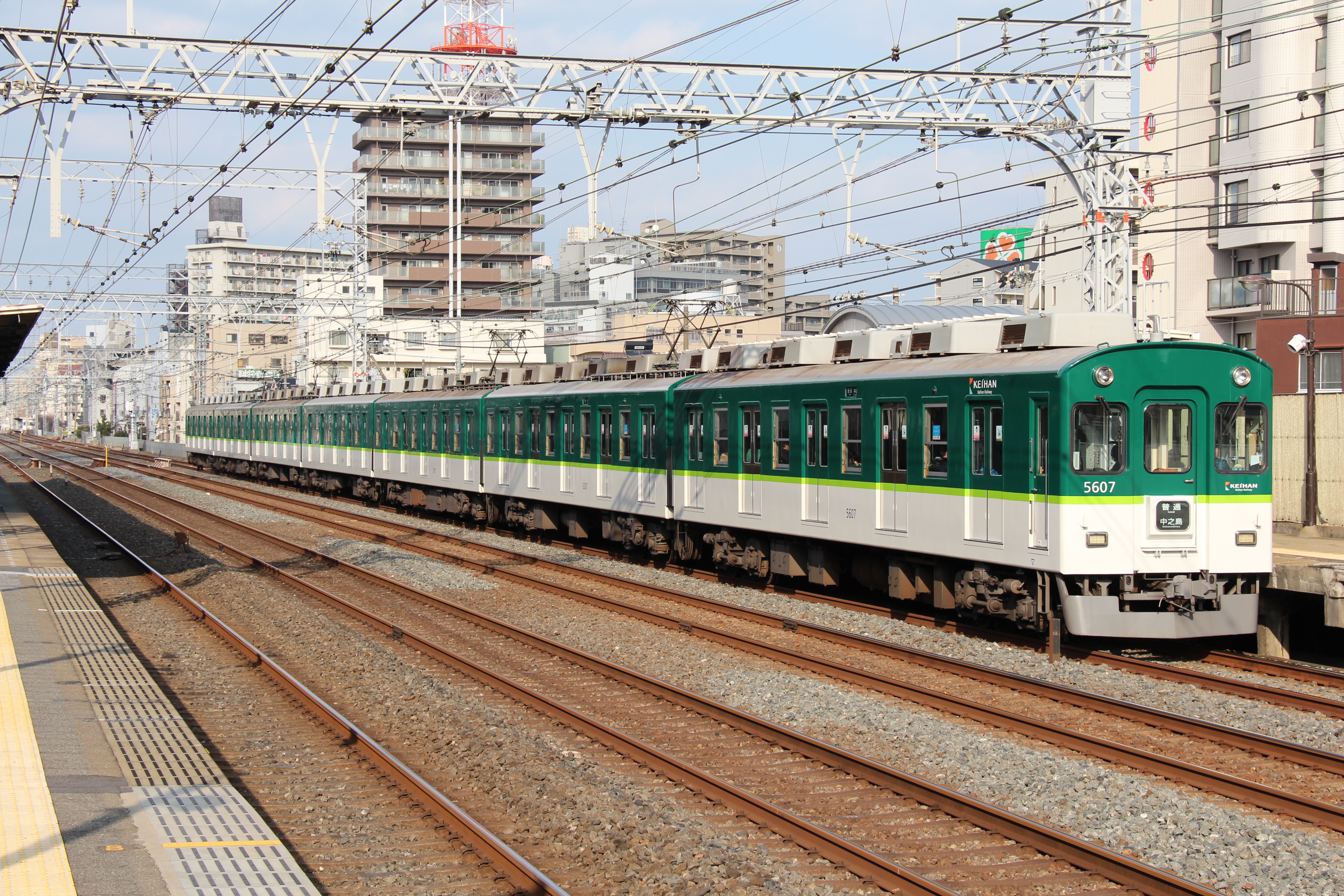
- A 5000 series set in revised livery in February 2013
- In service: 1970-2021
- Manufacturer: Kawasaki Heavy Industries
- Built at: Kobe
- Family name: Mitsugorō; City commuter
- Constructed: 1970–1980
- Entered service: 26 December 1970
- Scrapped: 2017–
- Number built: 50 vehicles
- Number in service: None
- Number preserved: 1 cab end
- Number scrapped: 22 vehicles (3 sets. of which, 1 due to accident damage)
- Formation: 7 cars per trainset
- Fleet numbers: 5551–5557
- Operator: Keihan Electric Railway

Specifications
- Car body construction: Aluminium alloy
- Car length: 18 m (59 ft 1 in)
- Doors: 5 pairs per side
- Maximum speed: 110 km/h (70 mph)
- Traction system: Field excitation control
- Electric system: 1,500 V DC
- Current collection: Overhead wire
- Safety system: Keihan ATS
- Track gauge: 1,435 mm (4 ft 8 1/2 in)

The Keihan 5000 series (京阪5000系, Keihan 5000-kei) was an electric multiple unit (EMU) commuter train type operated by the private railway operator Keihan Electric Railway in Japan from 1970 until September 2021.

== Formations ==
The fleet consisted of seven seven-car sets (5551 to 5557), formed as follows with four motored cars and three non-powered trailer cars.

Designation	TC1	M1	M2	T2	M3	M4	TC2
Numbering	555x	515x	525x	565x	510x	520x	560x

Each of the four motored ("M") cars has one scissors-type pantograph. The "M1" car is designated as a mildly air-conditioned car.

The T2 and M3 cars have a driving compartment at one end for depot shunting use, although driving controls have been removed from the two cars each in sets 5551 and 5552.

== Interior ==
Passenger accommodation consists of longitudinal bench seating throughout.

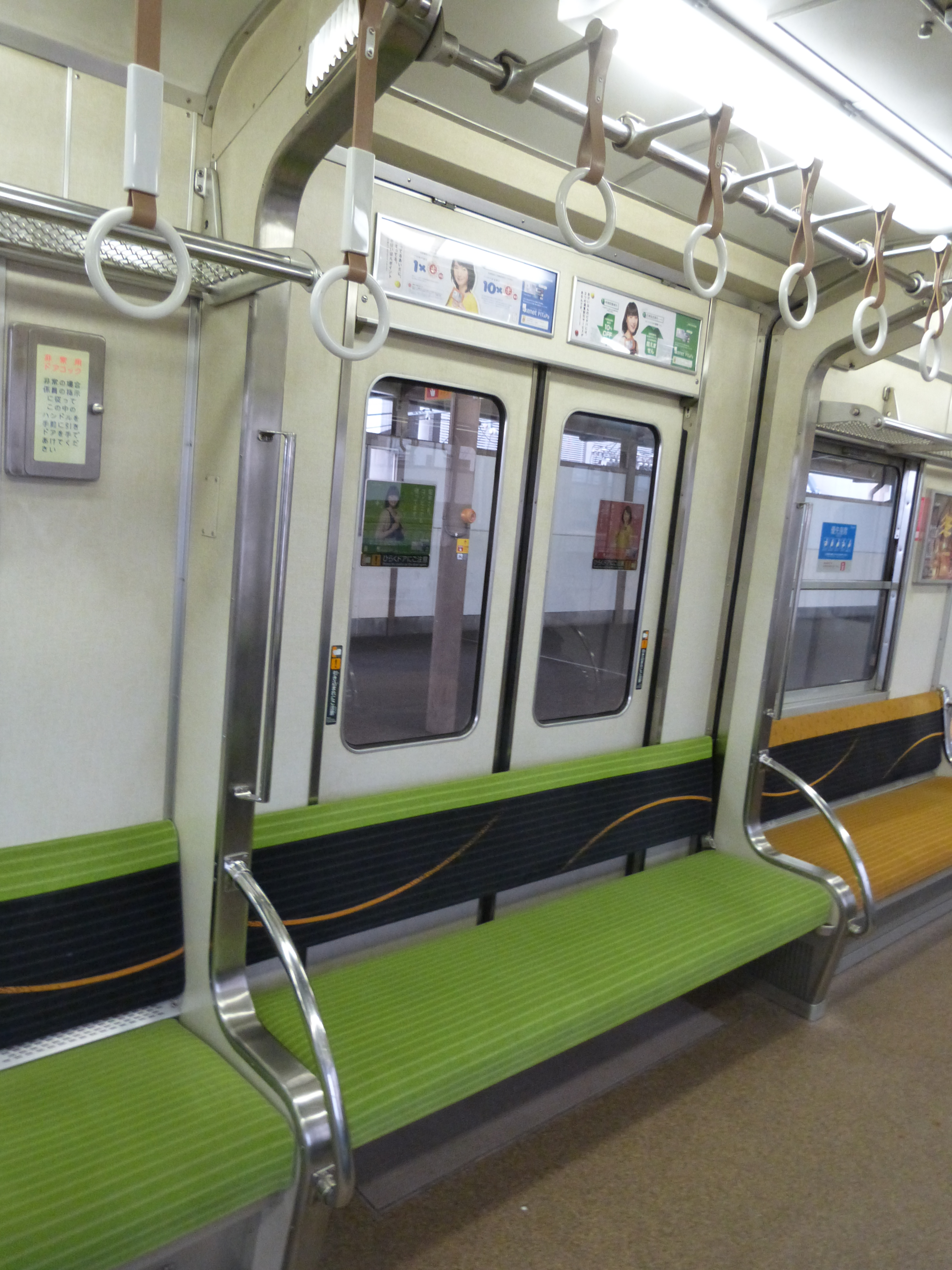
Rush hour only doors in day time

== History ==
First introduced in 1970, a total of 50 vehicles were built by 1980, including one car built in 1980 to replace a car damaged in a level crossing accident.

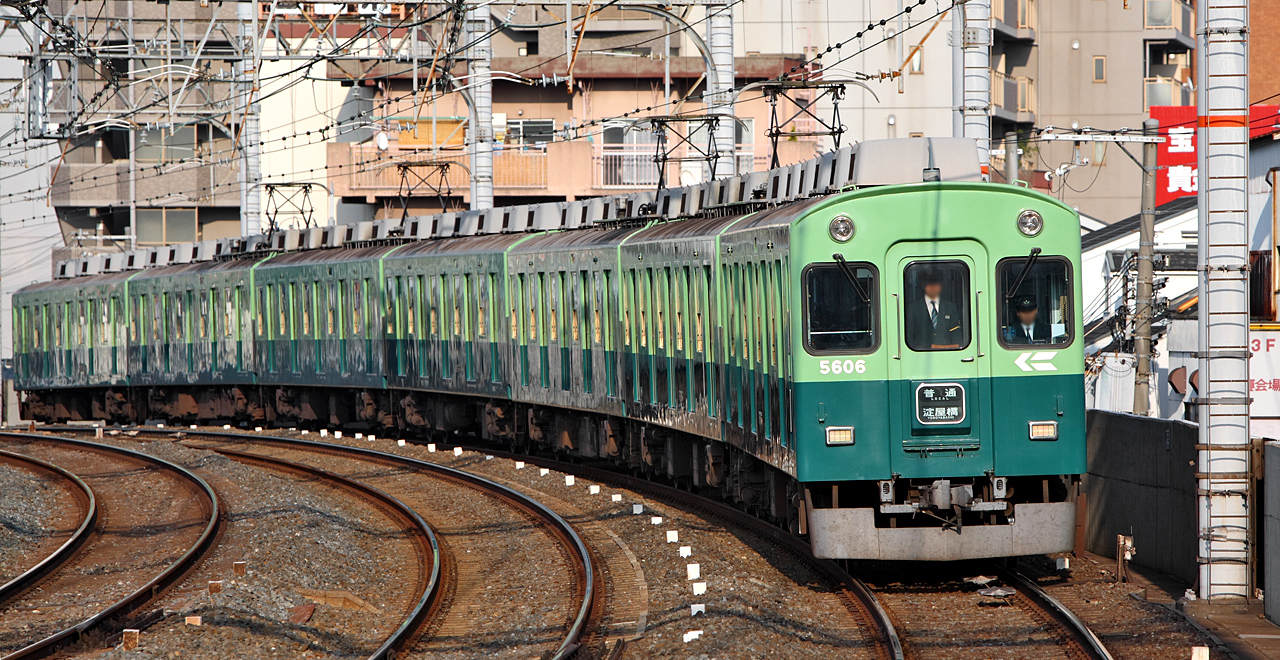
Set 5556 in original livery in April 2008

The last 5000 series train made its final run on September 4, 2021, following a postponement from June 1, 2021, due to a review of train operations.

== Preserved examples ==
- One cab end is preserved at Kuzuha Mall.
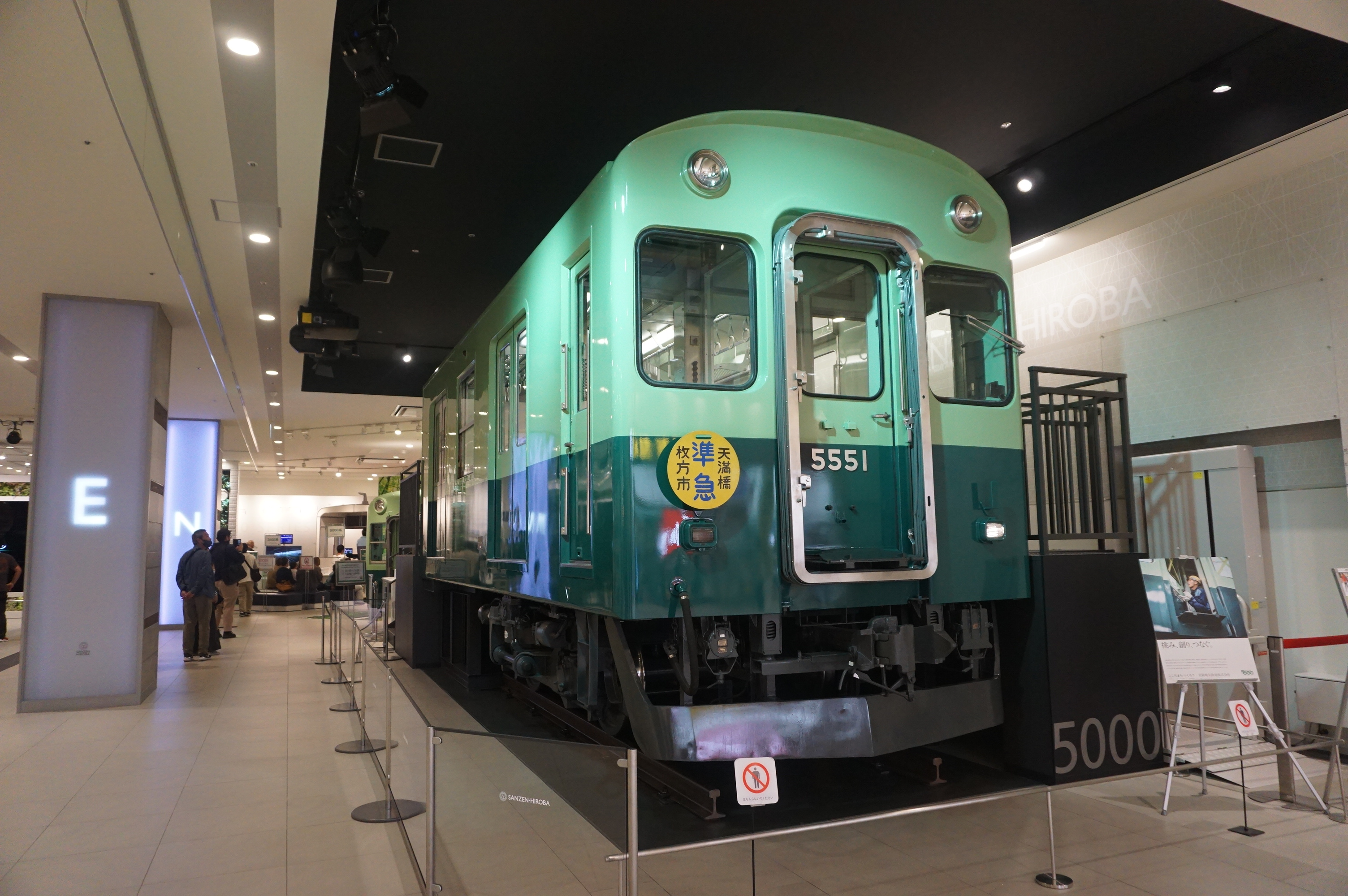
5551 cab end in May 2023
