= Multiple unit =

Self-propelled train

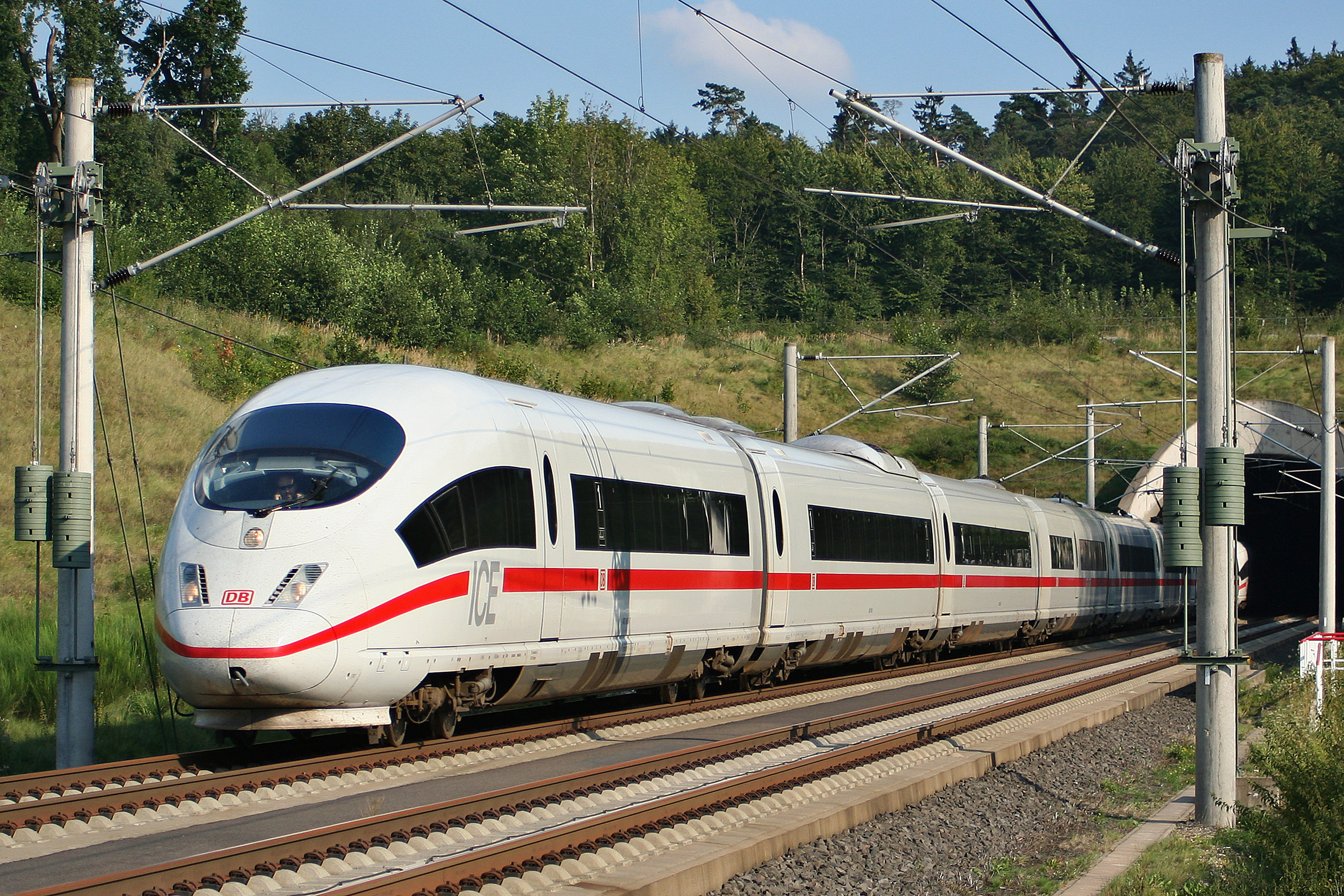
A Deutsche Bahn ICE 3 EMU capable of up to 320 km/h (199 mph) in Rhineland-Palatinate, Germany

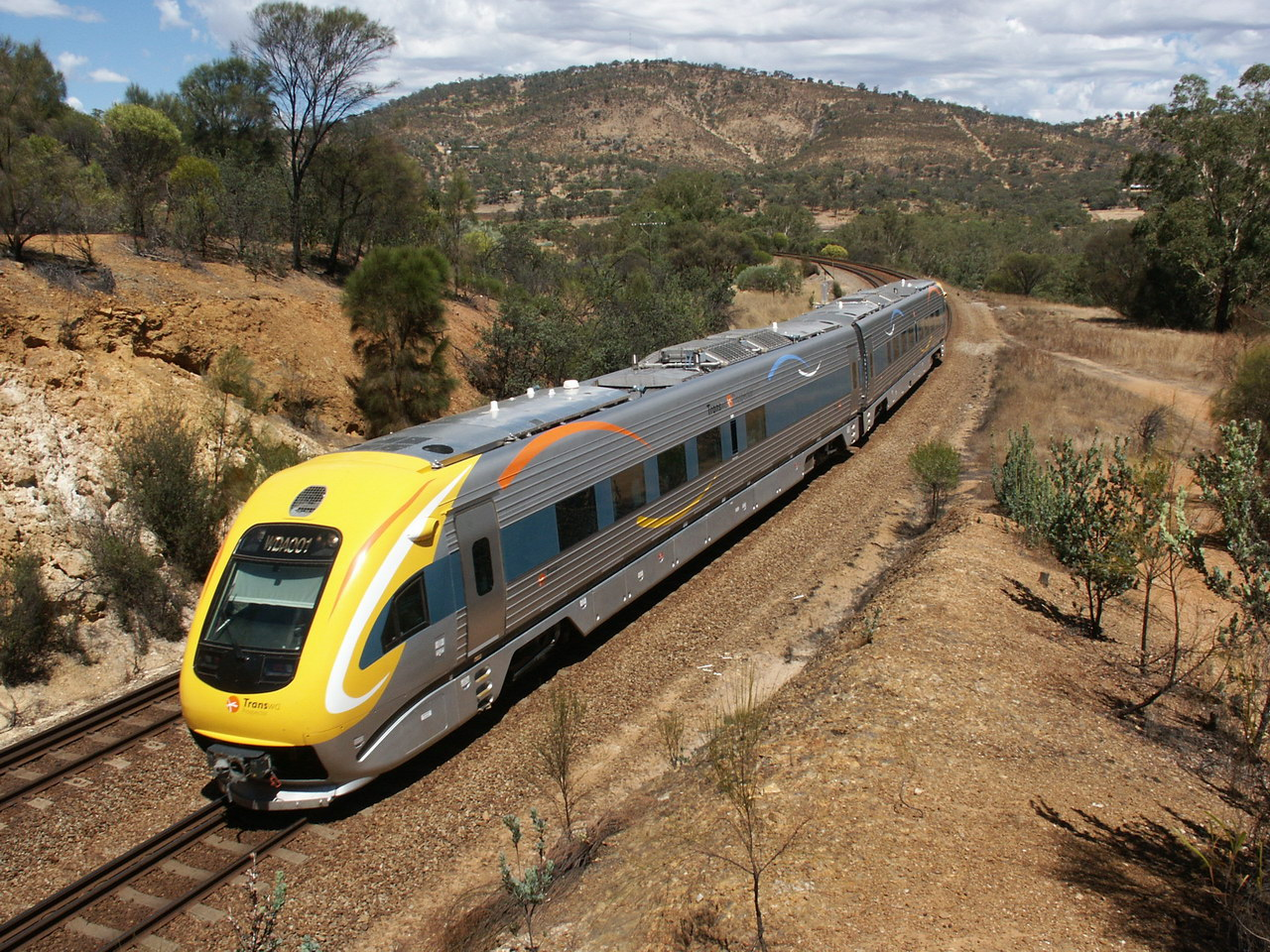
Transwa WDA/WDB/WDC class DMU operate the Prospector in Australia

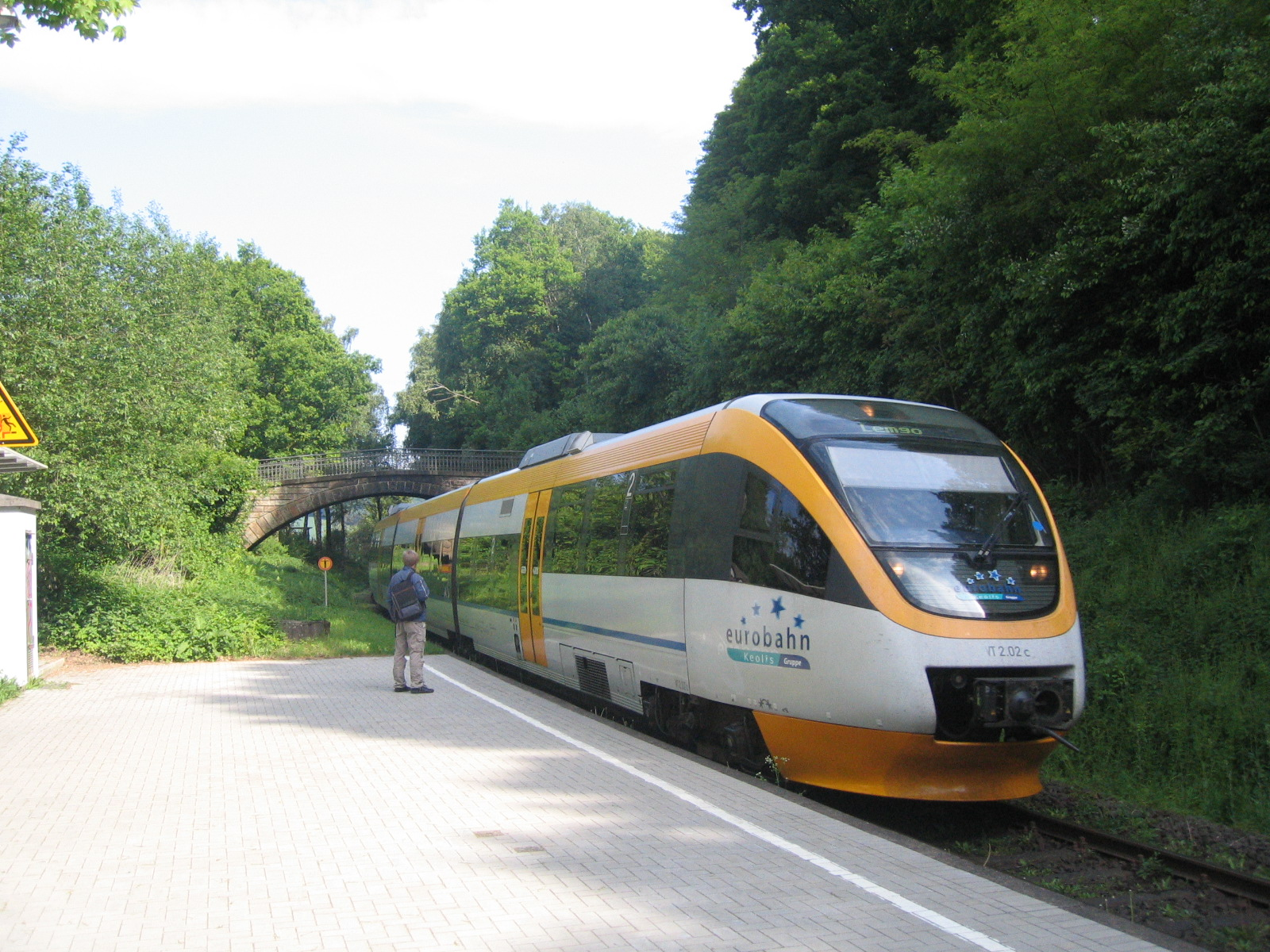
The Bombardier Talent articulated regional railcar

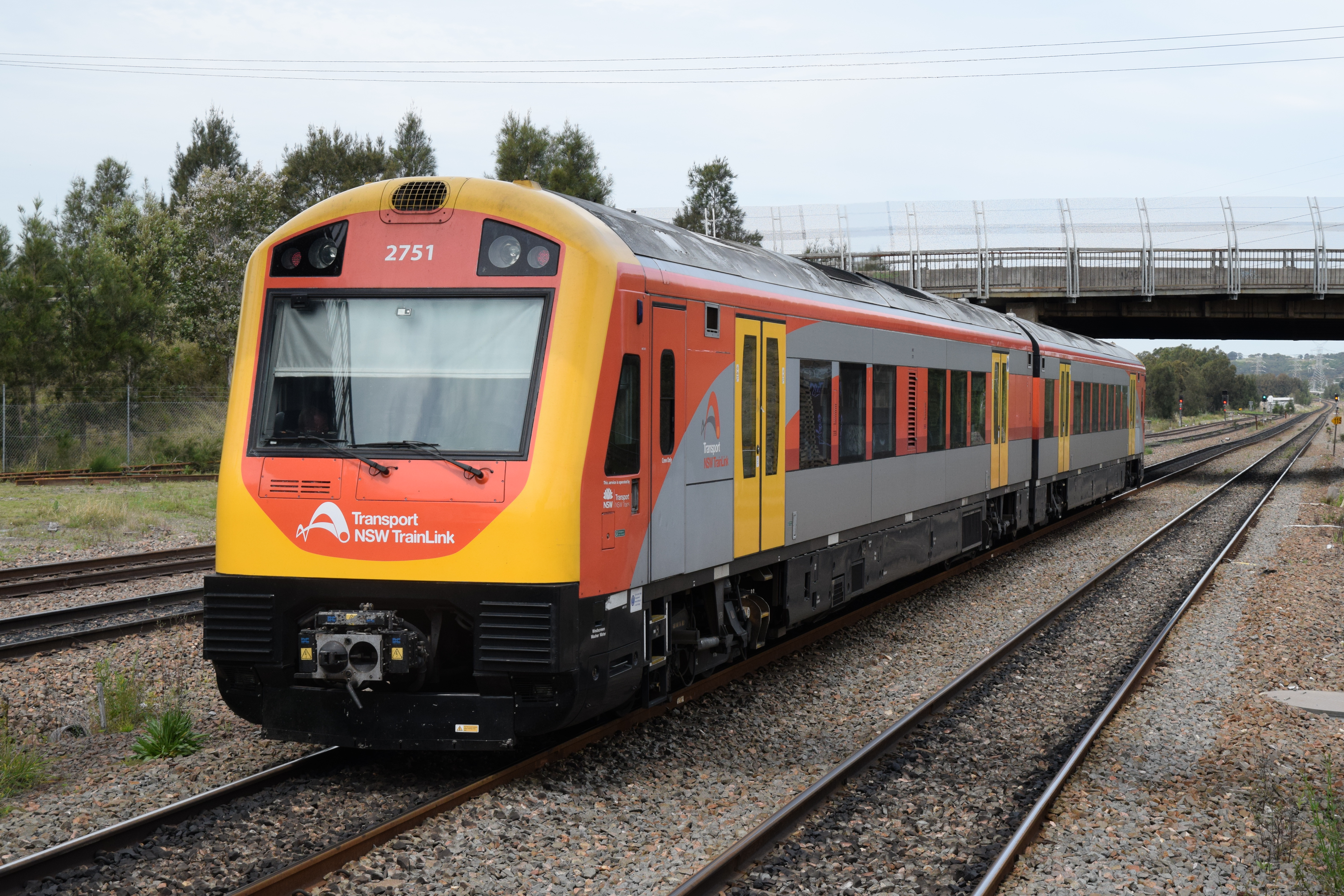
A two-car New South Wales Hunter railcar in Australia

A multiple-unit train (or multiple unit (MU)) is a self-propelled train or trainset composed of one or more carriages joined, and where one or more of the carriages have the means of propulsion built in. By contrast, a locomotive-hauled train has entirely unpowered carriages.

An implication of this is that all powered carriages must be controllable by a single engineer or driver, which falls under the broader concept of multiple-unit train control. In other words, all "multiple units" employ some variation of multiple-unit train control. In the broader context, "unit" means any powered rail vehicle, including locomotives (that do not carry cargo) and powered cargo-carrying carriages. In the context of this article, "unit" refers specifically to the latter only (whether the cargo is passengers or some other cargo).

What follows is that, if coupled to another multiple unit, all MUs can still be controlled by the single driver, with multiple-unit train control.

Although multiple units consist of several carriages, single self-propelled carriages – also called railcars, rail motor coaches or railbuses – are in fact multiple units when two or more of them are working connected through multiple-unit train control (regardless of whether passengers can walk between the units or not).

== History ==
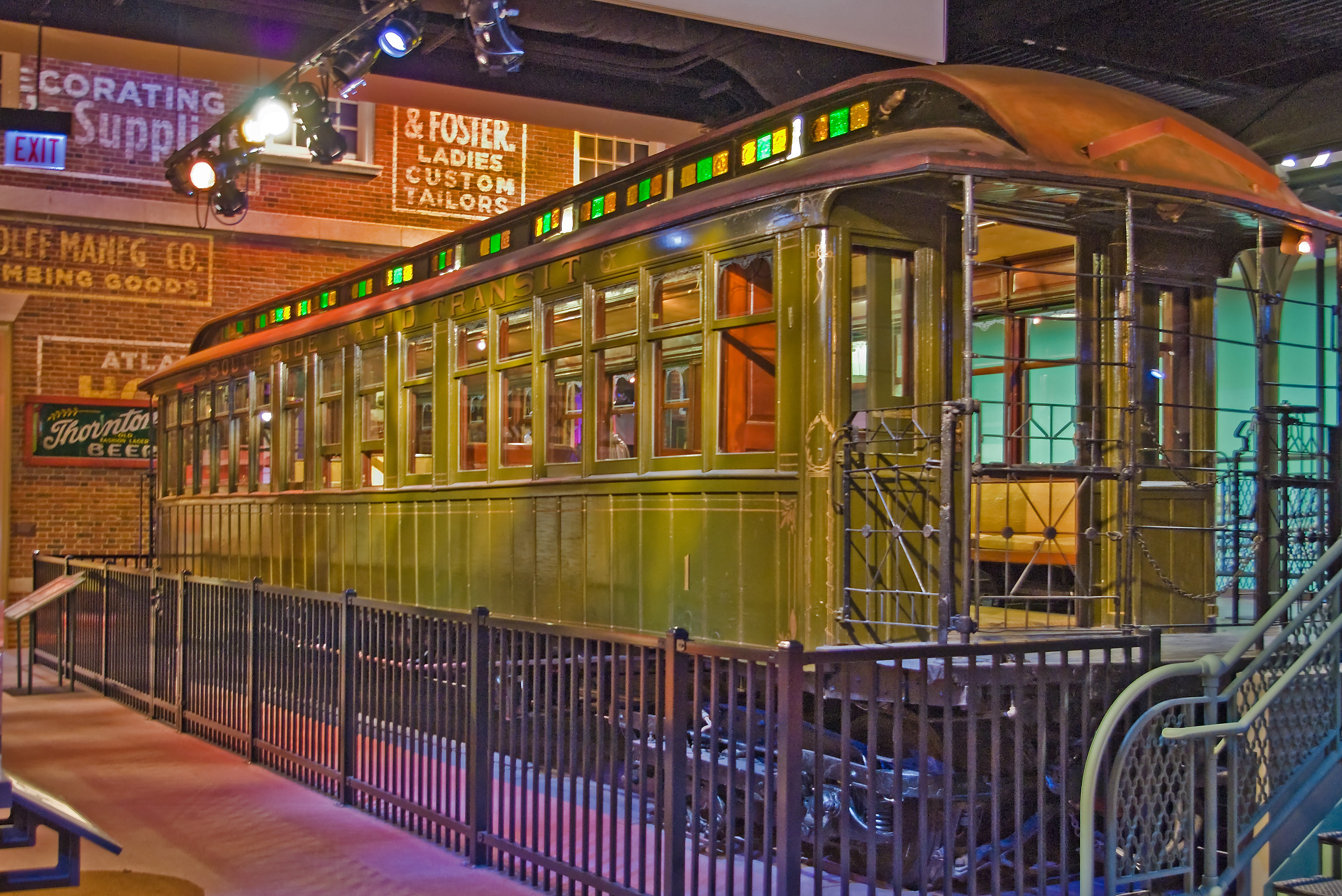
South Side Elevated Railroad car #1—one of the cars that Frank Sprague converted to MU operation in Chicago

Multiple-unit train control was first used in electric multiple units in the 1890s.

The Liverpool Overhead Railway opened in 1893 with two-car electric multiple units, controllers in cabs at both ends directly controlling the traction current to motors on both cars.

The multiple-unit traction control system was developed by Frank Sprague and first applied and tested on the South Side Elevated Railroad (now part of the Chicago 'L') in 1897. In 1895, Frank Sprague, whose company invented and produced direct-current elevator control systems, developed a multiple-unit controller for electric train operation. This accelerated the construction of electric-traction railways and trolley systems worldwide. Each car of the train has its own traction motors. Motor control relays in each car, energized by train-line wires from the front car, control all the traction motors in the train in unison.

== Design ==
Most MUs are powered either by traction motors, receiving their power through a third rail or overhead wire (EMU), or by a diesel engine (DMU) driving a generator producing electricity to drive traction motors.

A MU has the same power and traction components as a locomotive, but instead of the components being concentrated in one car, they are spread throughout the cars that make up the unit. In many cases, these cars can only propel themselves when they are part of the unit, so they are semi-permanently coupled. For example, in a DMU one car might carry the prime mover and traction motors, and another the engine for head-end power generation; an EMU might have one car carry the pantograph and transformer, and another car carry the traction motors.

MU cars can be motor or trailer cars; not all need to be motorized. Trailer cars can carry supplementary equipment such as air compressors and batteries, and may also be fitted with a driving cab.

In most cases, MU trains can only be driven/controlled from dedicated cab cars. However, in some MU trains, every car is equipped with a driving console and other controls necessary to operate the train; every car can be used as a cab car, whether it is motorized or not, at the end of the train. An example of this arrangement is the NJ Transit Arrows.

=== Weight reduction ===
An advantage of multiple-unit trains is that they can be engineered to be lighter than locomotive-hauled trains with separate carriages, using lightweighting techniques to reduce energy use, track wear, and operating costs. The term "light-weight train" was first used in the 1930s, with early designs such as the 1934 M-10000 and Pioneer Zephyr in the United States, and Germany's 1932 Flying Hamburger.

Modern light-weight multiple units typically use fewer bogies and distribute traction equipment across the train, improving efficiency and axle loading. However, they require particular design attention for bridge loading and crosswind safety, and often include noise and vibration mitigation systems.

Examples from the 21st century include the lightweight Talgo sets used in Spain and exported to Germany and Denmark, India's modern Vande Bharat Express units, and the upcoming TELLi fleet for SNCF regional lines in France.

== Passenger multiple units ==
Virtually all rapid-transit rolling stock, such as on the New York City Subway, the London Underground, the Paris Metro, and other subway systems, is multiple-units, usually EMUs. Most trains in the Netherlands and Japan are MUs, being suitable for use in areas of high population density.

Many high-speed rail trains are also multiple-units, such as the Japanese Shinkansen and the German Intercity-Express ICE 3 high-speed trains. A new high-speed MU, the AGV, was unveiled by France's Alstom on 5 February 2008. It has a claimed service speed of 360 km/h (220 mph). India's ICF announced the country's first high-speed engine-less train named 'train 18', which would run at 250 km/h (160 mph) maximum speed.

Passenger multiple units can be divided into articulated trains and non-articulated trains. The first type can be divided again into the TGV/AGV subtype (which uses Jacobs bogies) and the Talgo subtype.

== Freight multiple units ==
Multiple units have occasionally been used for freight traffic, such as carrying containers, or for maintenance trains. The Japanese M250 series train has four front and end carriages that are EMUs, and has been operating since March 2004. The German CargoSprinter has been used in three countries since 2003.

== Comparison to locomotive-hauled trains ==
=== Advantages ===
==== Energy efficiency ====
They are more energy-efficient than locomotive-hauled trains.

==== Gradients ====
They have better adhesion, as more of the train's weight is carried on driven wheels, rather than the locomotive having to haul the dead weight of unpowered coaches.

==== Acceleration ====
They have a higher power-to-weight ratio than a locomotive-hauled train because they don't have a heavy locomotive that carries no passengers and adds to the train's total weight. This is particularly important where train services make frequent stops, since the energy required to accelerate the train increases significantly with weight. Because of the energy efficiency and higher adhesive-weight-to-total-weight ratio values, they generally have higher acceleration ability than locomotive-type trains and are favored in urban trains and metro systems for frequent start/stop routines.

==== Turnaround times ====
Most of them have cabs at both ends, resulting in quicker turnaround times, reduced crewing costs, and enhanced safety. The faster turnaround time and the reduced size (due to higher frequencies) as compared to large locomotive-hauled trains have made the MU a major part of suburban commuter rail services in many countries. Most rapid transit systems also use MUs. However, the need to turn a locomotive is no longer a problem for locomotive-hauled trains due to the increasing use of push-pull trains.

==== Failure ====
Multiple units may usually be quickly made up or separated into sets of varying lengths. Several multiple units may run as a single train, then be broken at a junction point into shorter trains for different destinations. As there are multiple engines/motors, the failure of one engine does not prevent the train from continuing its journey. A locomotive-drawn train typically has only one power unit, and the failure of that unit will shut down the train. However, some locomotive-hauled trains may contain more than one power unit and thus be able to continue at reduced speed after the failure of one power unit.

==== Axle loads ====
They have lighter axle loads, allowing operation on lighter tracks, where locomotives may be banned. Another side effect of this is reduced track wear, as traction forces can be distributed across many axles rather than just the four or six of a locomotive. They generally have rigid couplers rather than the flexible ones commonly used on locomotive-hauled trains. That means brakes/throttle can be applied more quickly without the excessive jerk experienced in passenger coaches. In a locomotive-hauled train, adjusting the number of cars to meet demand will also affect acceleration and braking performance. This calls for performance calculations to be done, taking the heaviest train composition into account. This may sometimes cause some trains during off-peak periods to be overpowered relative to the required performance. When 2 or more multiple units are coupled, train performance remains almost unchanged. However, in locomotive-hauled train compositions, using more powerful locomotives for longer trains can solve this problem.

=== Disadvantages ===
==== Maintenance ====
It may be easier to maintain one locomotive than many self-propelled cars. In the past, it was often safer to locate the train's power systems away from passengers. This was particularly the case for steam locomotives, but still has some relevance for casualties than one with a locomotive (where the heavy locomotive would act as a "crumple zone").

==== Failure ====
If a locomotive fails, it can be easily replaced with minimal shunting movements. There would be no need for passengers to evacuate the train. Failure of a multiple-unit train will often require a whole new train and time-consuming switching operations; passengers would also be asked to evacuate the failed train and board another. However, if the train consists of more than one multiple unit, they are often designed so that, in the event of a failure of one unit, the others in the train can tow it in neutral if the brakes and other safety systems are operational.

==== Idle trains ====
Idle trains do not waste expensive motive power resources. Separate locomotives mean that costly motive power assets can be moved around as needed and used to haul freight trains. A multiple-unit arrangement would limit the use of these costly motive power resources to passenger transportation.

==== Passage between units ====
It is difficult to have gangway connections between coupled units while retaining an aerodynamic leading front end. Because of this, there is usually no passage between high-speed coupled units, though lower-speed coupled units frequently have connections between coupled units. This may require more crew members, so that ticket inspectors, for example, can be present in all of them. This leads to higher operating costs and lower use of crew resources. In a locomotive-hauled train, one crew can serve the train regardless of the number of cars in the train, provided the limits of individual workload are not exceeded. Likewise, in such instances, buffet cars and other shared passenger facilities may need to be duplicated in each unit, reducing efficiency.

==== Flexibility ====
Large locomotives can be used instead of small locomotives where more power is needed. Also, different types of passenger cars (such as reclining-seats, compartment cars, couchettes, sleepers, restaurant cars, buffet cars, etc.) can be easily added to or removed from a locomotive-drawn train. This is not so easy for a multiple-unit system, since individual cars can be attached or detached only in a maintenance facility. This also allows a loco-hauled train to be flexible in terms of the number of cars. Cars can be added or removed one by one, but on multiple units, two or more units must be coupled. This is not so flexible.

==== Noise ====
The passenger environment in a multiple unit is often noticeably noisier than in a locomotive-hauled train, due to the presence of underfloor machinery. The same applies to vibration. This is a particular problem with DMUs.

==== Obsolescence ====
Separating the motive power from the payload-carrying cars means that either can be replaced when obsolete without affecting the other.

== By country ==
=== Africa ===
==== Algeria ====
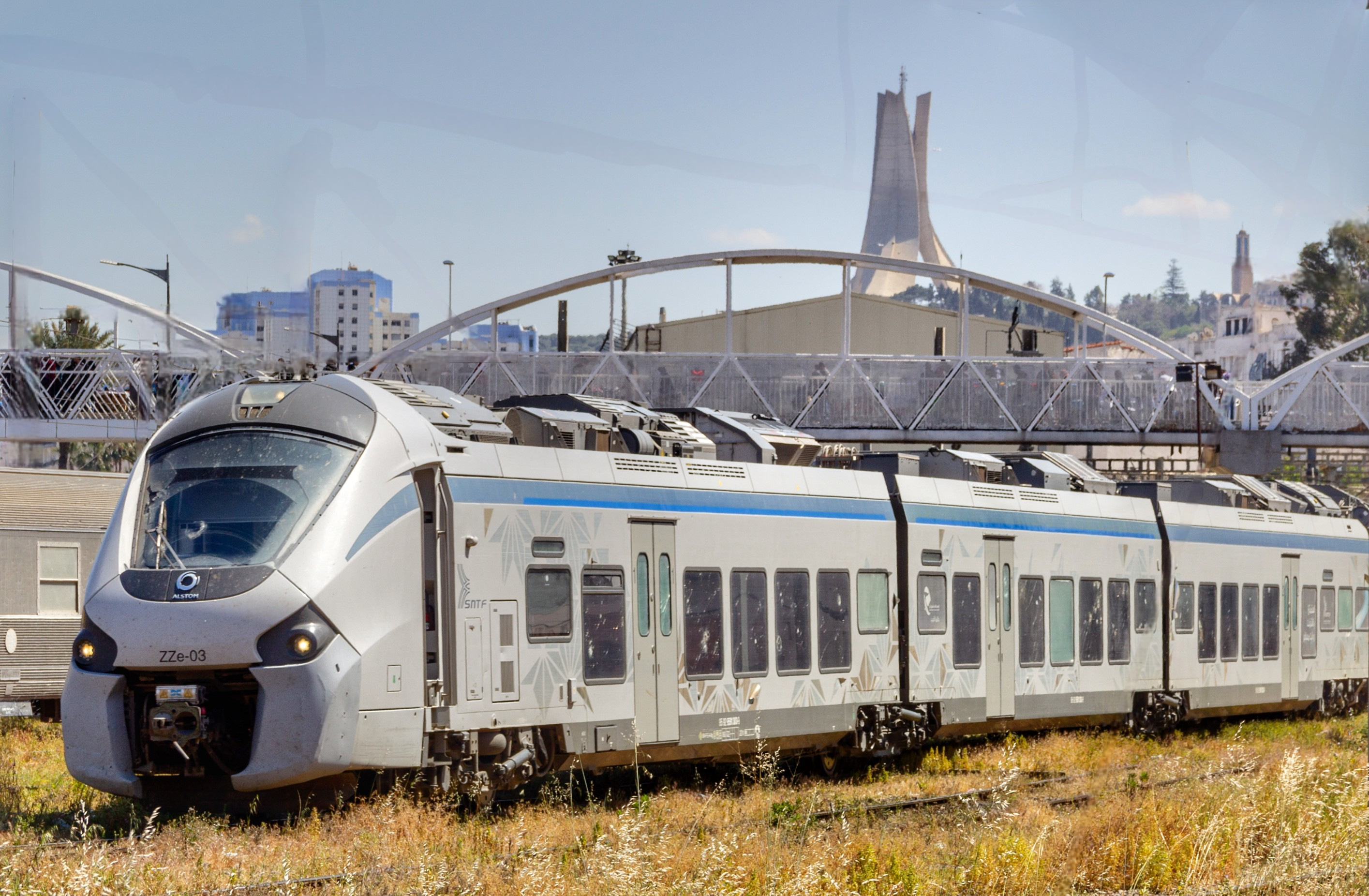
A Coradia ZZe trainset from SNTF at Agha Station

Algeria possesses 17 units of the Coradia El Djazaïr, a multiple-unit train produced by Alstom. These units are similar to the French version of Régiolis, which is part of the Coradia family.

==== South Africa ====
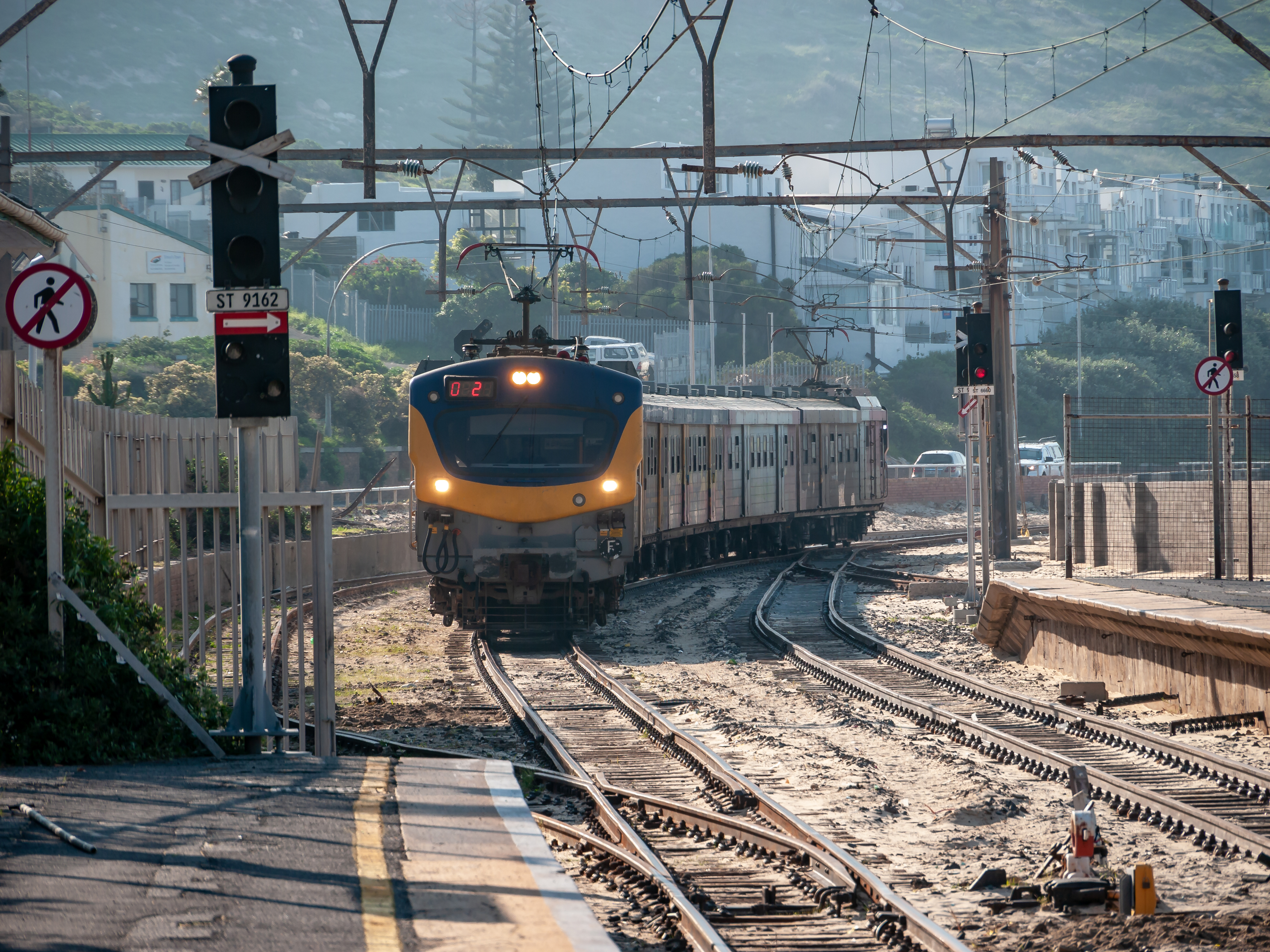
Metrorail 10M5 approaching Simon's Town station, Cape Town

Metrorail, which provides commuter rail service in major urban areas of South Africa, operates most of its services with electric multiple-unit train sets of the 5M2A type. These trains are being gradually refurbished and subsequently designated as 10M3 (Cape Town), 10M4 (Gauteng), or 10M5 (Durban). Metrorail services are split into four regions: Gauteng, KwaZulu-Natal, Eastern Cape, and Western Cape.

Gautrain, a commuter rail system in Johannesburg, operates with Bombardier Electrostar electric multiple units.

=== East Asia ===
==== China ====
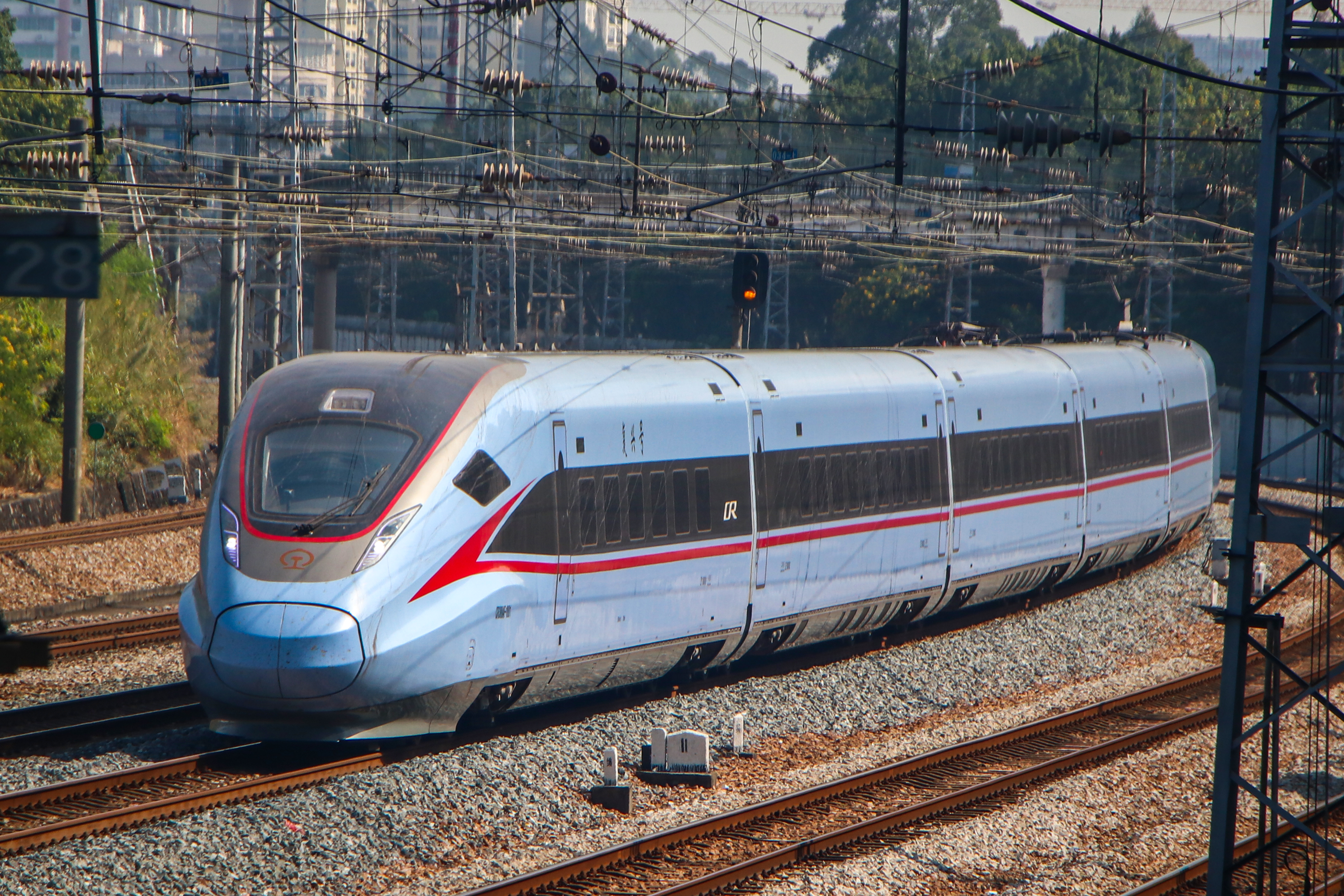
A China Railway High-speed EMU named CR300AF heading towards Guangzhou

The concept of multiple units has entered the public eye in China since the 6th Speed-up Campaign of China Railway in 2007. With the upgrade of Jinghu Railway, North Jingguang Railway, Jingha Railway and Hukun Railway, and the construction of new Passenger Dedicated Lines (or Passenger Railways) completed, CRH (China Railway High-speed) trains have been put into service, mainly in North and Northeast China, and East China. All these CRH trains are electric multiple units. This was the beginning of the general service of multiple-unit trains in China's national railway system.

Long before the introduction of the CRH brand, multiple-unit trains had been running on metro lines in all major cities in China.

==== Japan ====
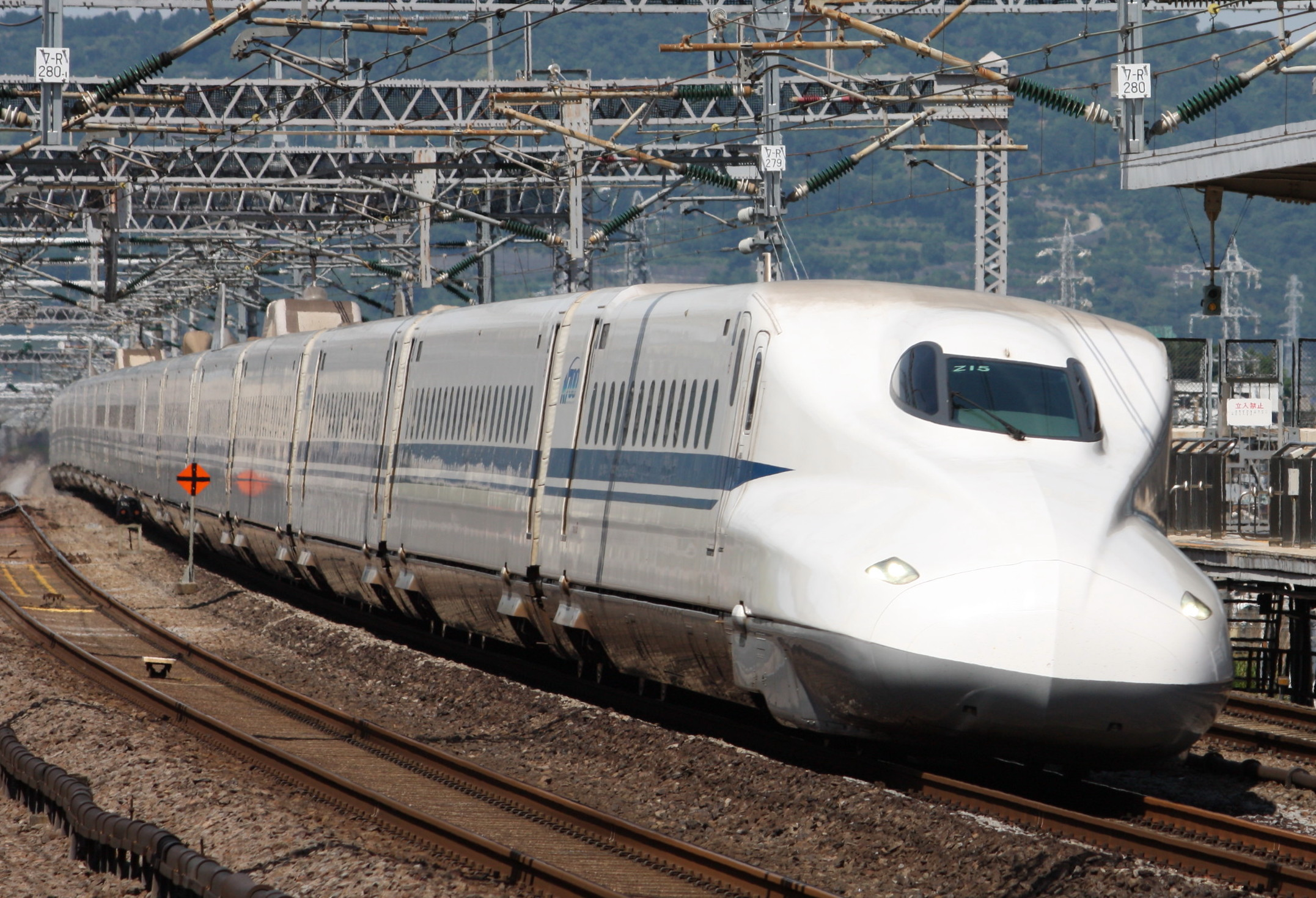
A N700 Series Shinkansen set

In Japan, almost all passenger trains, including the high-speed Shinkansen, are multiple-unit (MU) trains, with most locomotives now used solely for freight operations. Of the locomotive-hauled passenger services still in operation, the majority are tourist-oriented, including numerous steam-hauled trains operated seasonally on scenic lines throughout the country, as well as some luxury cruise trains.

Japan is a country of high population density with a large number of railway passengers in relatively small urban areas, and frequent operation of short-distance trains has been required. Therefore, the high acceleration ability and quick turnaround times of MUs have advantages, encouraging their development in this country. Additionally, the mountainous terrain gives the MUs an advantage on grades steeper than those found in most countries, particularly on small private lines, many of which run from coastal cities to small mountain towns.

Locomotives operated most long-distance trains in Japan until the 1950s. Still, by utilizing and enhancing short-distance urban MU train technology, long-distance express MU-type vehicles were developed and widely introduced starting in the mid-1950s. This work led to the original Shinkansen development, which optimized the EMU's efficiency to maximize speed. It was introduced upon completion of the Tokaido Shinkansen (literally "new trunk line") in 1964. By the 1970s, locomotive traction was regarded as slow and inefficient, and its use is now mostly limited to freight trains.

From 1999, there have been development efforts in freight EMU technology. Still, it is currently used only for an express freight service on the Tokaido Main Line between Tokyo and Osaka. The government has been pushing for the adoption of freight EMU technology on energy-efficiency grounds, in the hope that widespread adoption could help meet CO_{2} emissions targets. The effort has been principally targeted at express package shipping that would otherwise travel by road.

==== South Korea ====
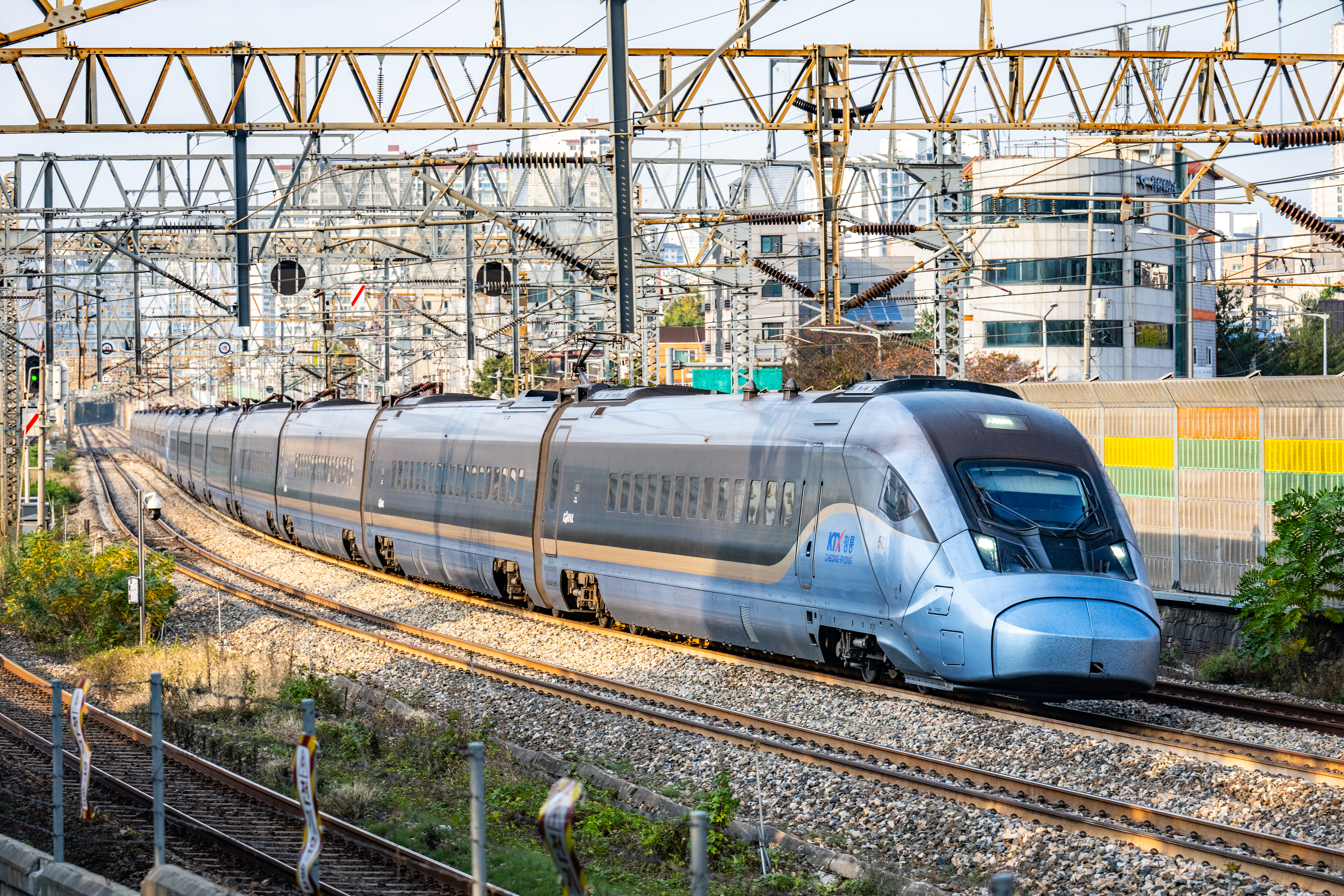
A Korean EMU KTX-Cheongryong

In South Korea, the KTX-I and KTX-Sancheon, which are still centralized power trains, are the main trains, but the KTX-Eum, which opened in 2021, and the KTX-Cheongryong, which opened in 2024, are the multiple-unit trains.

=== Europe ===
==== Belgium ====
The first EMUs have been introduced in Belgium in the 1930s. Several models have followed since then, such as the AM75.

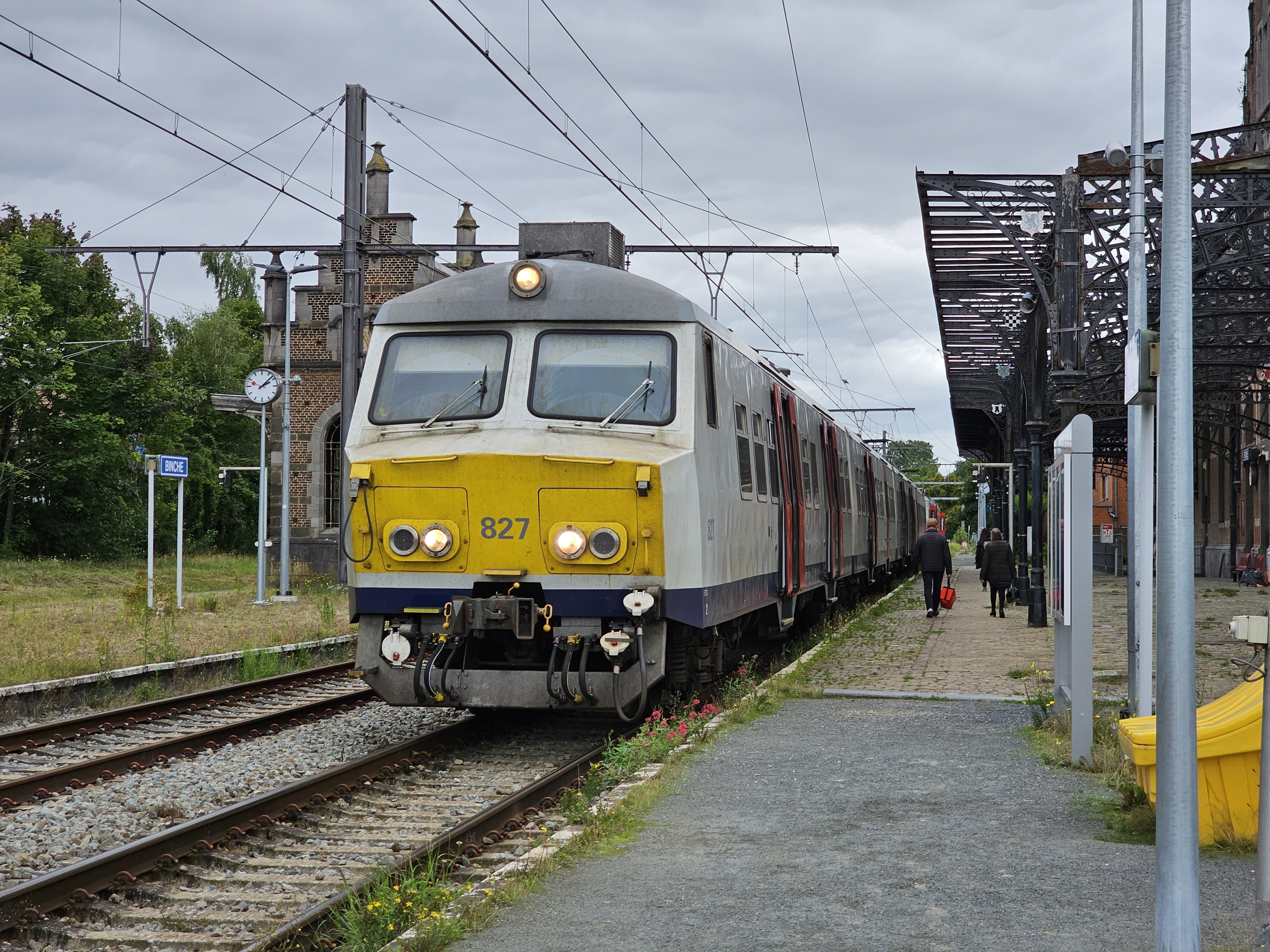
AM75 at Binche train station (Belgium).

==== Ireland ====
CIÉ introduced its first DMUs, the 2600-class, in 1951.

==== Russia ====
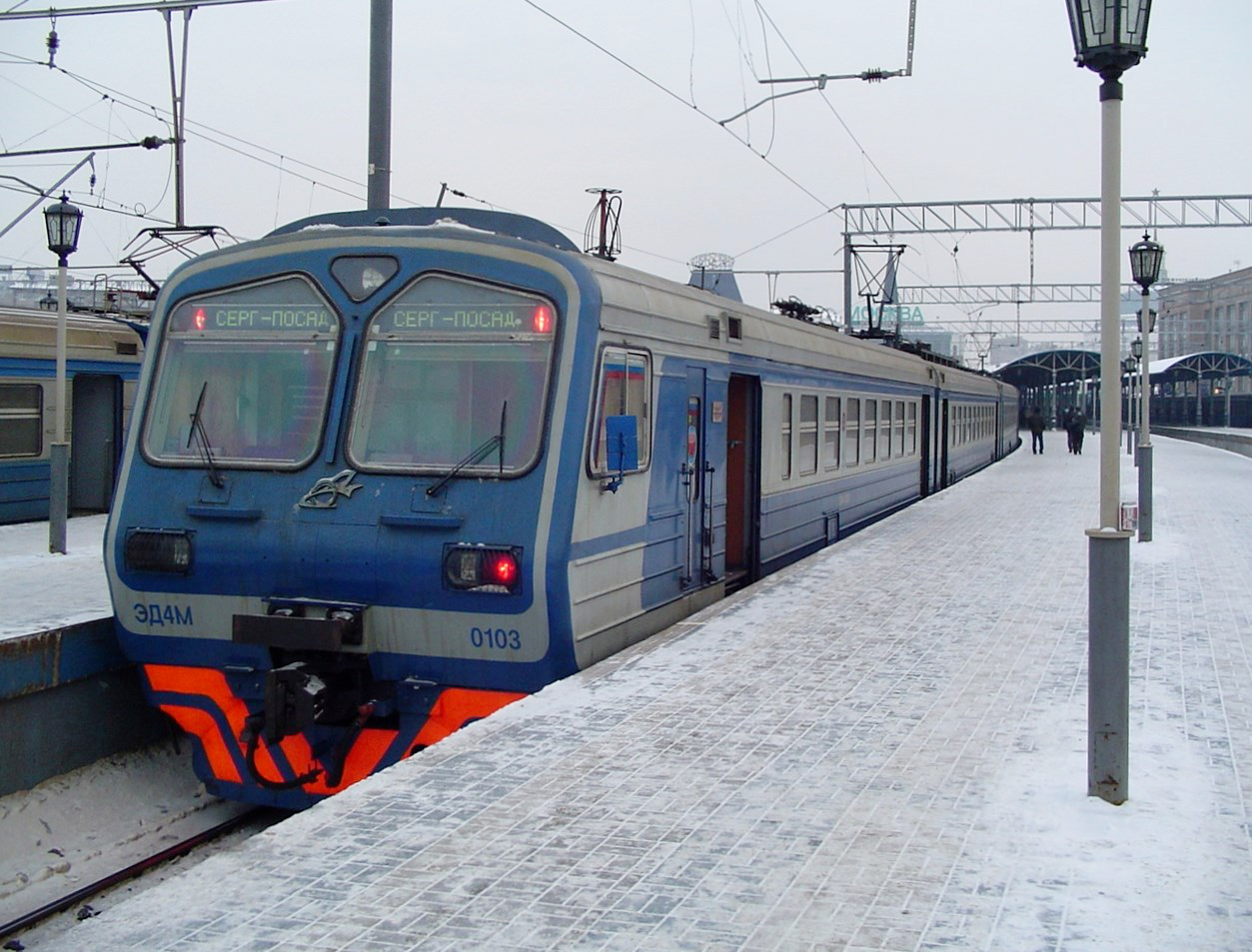
Elektrichka on Yaroslavskiy Rail Terminal, Moscow

Elektrichka (Russian: электри́чка, Ukrainian: електри́чка, romanized: elektrychka) is an informal word for elektropoezd (Russian: электропо́езд), a Soviet or post-Soviet regional (mostly suburban) electrical multiple unit passenger train. Elektrichkas are widespread in Russia, Ukraine, and some other countries of the former Soviet Union. The first elektrichka ride occurred in August 1929 between Moscow and Mytishchi.

==== Sweden ====
Swedish railroads have been privatized in stages over about 25 years, and today, many companies operate various types of multiple units. A majority of passenger trains today consist of multiple-unit trains, which regional traffic exclusively uses.

==== Switzerland ====
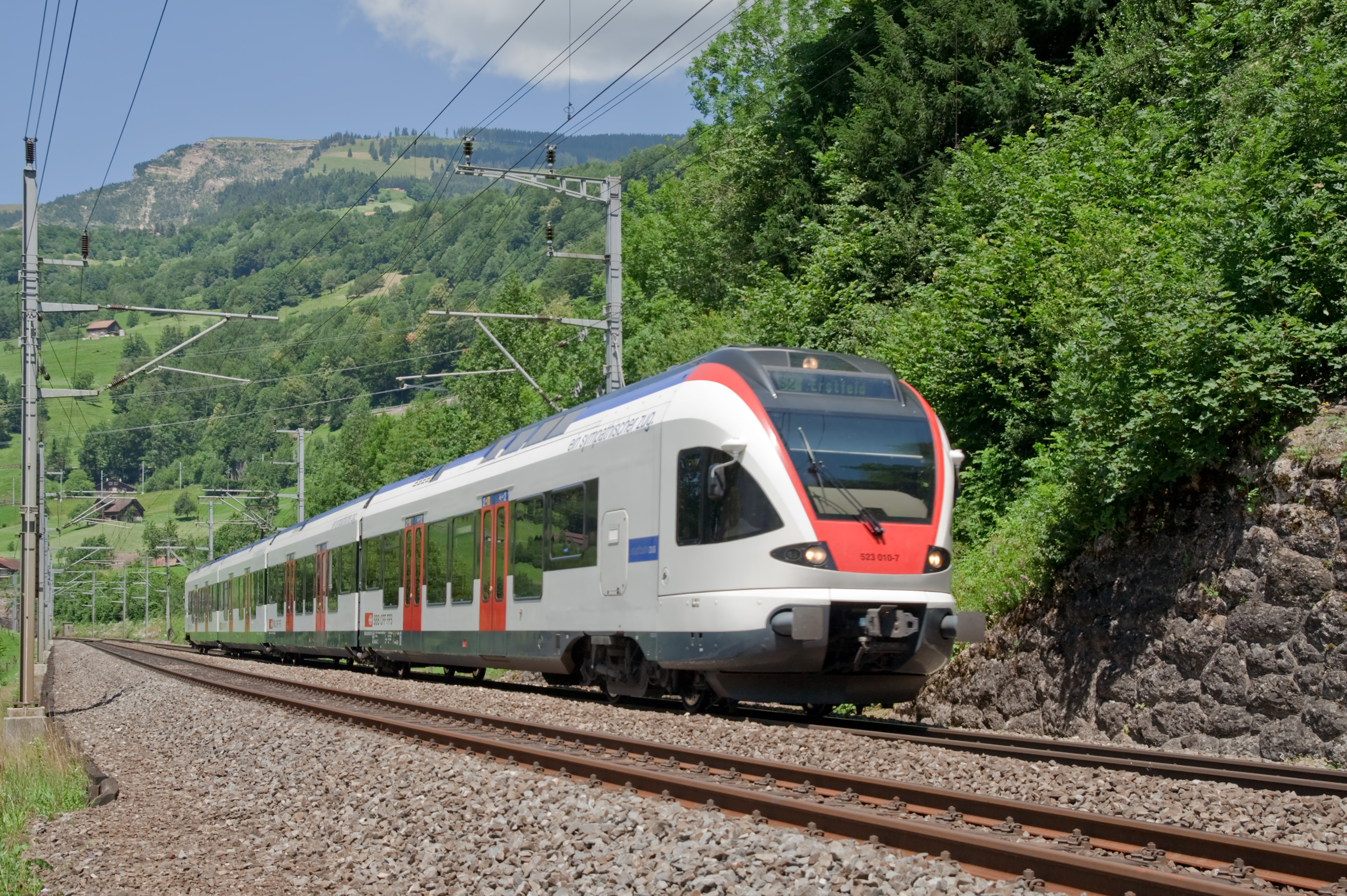
The RABe 523 is the most common multiple unit in Switzerland, used by almost every S-Bahn.

The Swiss Federal Railways use many multiple units, mainly on regional lines (S-Bahn).

- Regional lines
  - RBDe 560
  - RABe 514
  - RABe 520 "Thurbo"
  - RABe 523 "FLIRT" and variants
  - RABe 511 "KISS"
- Inter-City lines
  - RABDe 500 "ICN"
- International lines
  - ETR 610
  - RABe 501

==== United Kingdom ====
In the UK, both electric and diesel multiple units are commonplace on suburban and intercity lines, having been introduced from the early 1900s.

Early electric multiple units include the Southern Railway 3Subs, London and North Western 'Oerlikons' and London Underground 1903 Stock. More extensive adoption of multiple units, especially diesel multiple units (DMUs), began in the 1950s, as British Rail sought to replace steam-hauled services. This would result in several classes of first generation DMUs being built, all similar in design. The vast majority of this design was withdrawn in the 1980s and 1990s, although the Class 121 was used in service with Chiltern Railways from 2003 to 2017.

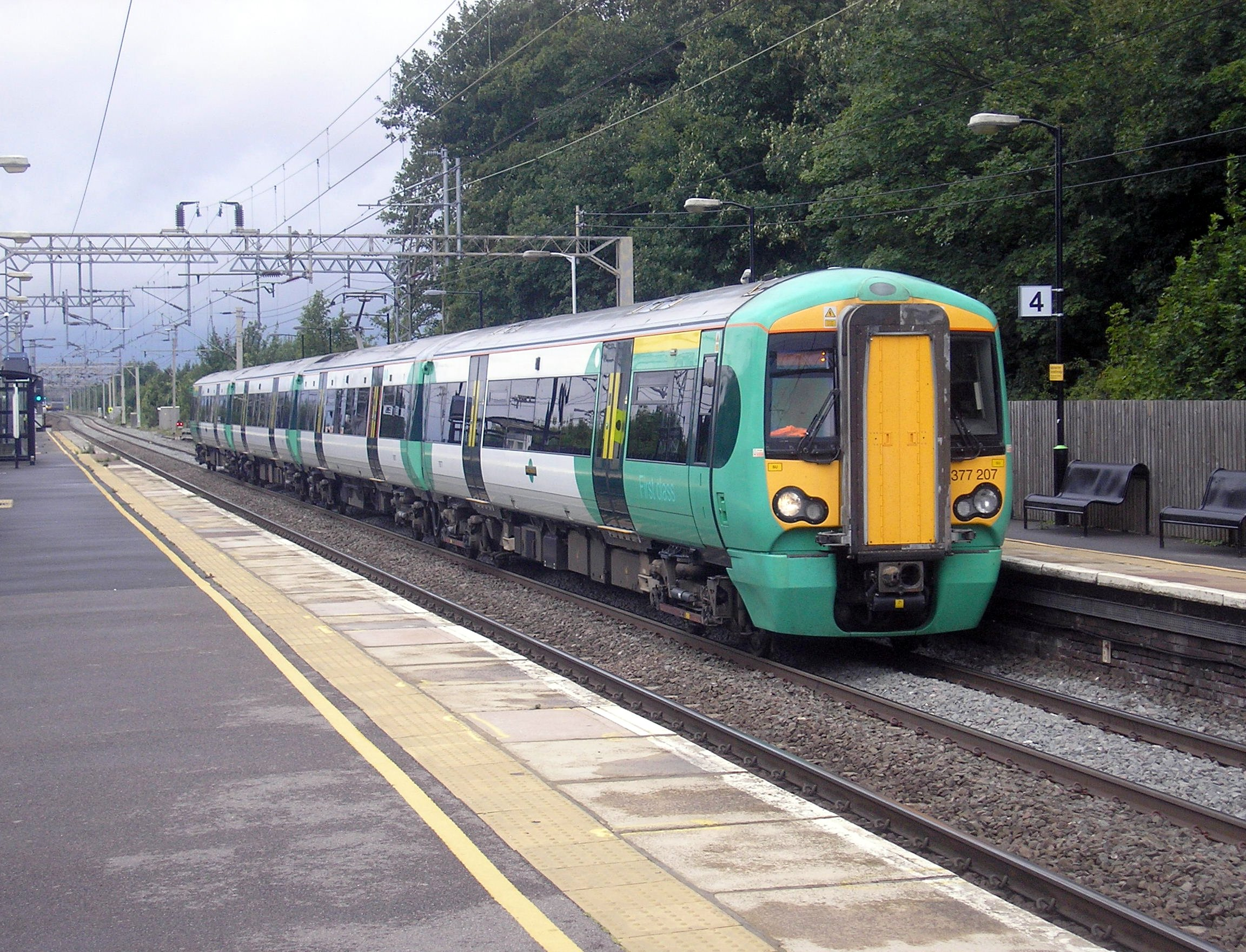
Southern Class 377/2

Examples of modern multiple units include the Sprinter and Electrostar families, as well as the newer Aventra family.

The London Underground passenger system is operated exclusively by EMUs. Work trains on the Underground employ separate locomotives, some of which are dual-battery/live-rail powered.

In Northern Ireland, the majority of passenger services have been operated by diesel multiple units since the mid-1950s under the tenure of both the Ulster Transport Authority (1948–1966) and Northern Ireland Railways (since 1967).

=== Oceania ===
==== Australia ====
The first multiple units in Australia were the Tait trains, wooden-bodied Electric Multiple Unit trains that operated in Melbourne, Victoria. They were originally introduced as steam locomotive-hauled carriages but were converted to electric traction from 1919 during Melbourne's electrification project.

=== South Asia ===
==== India ====
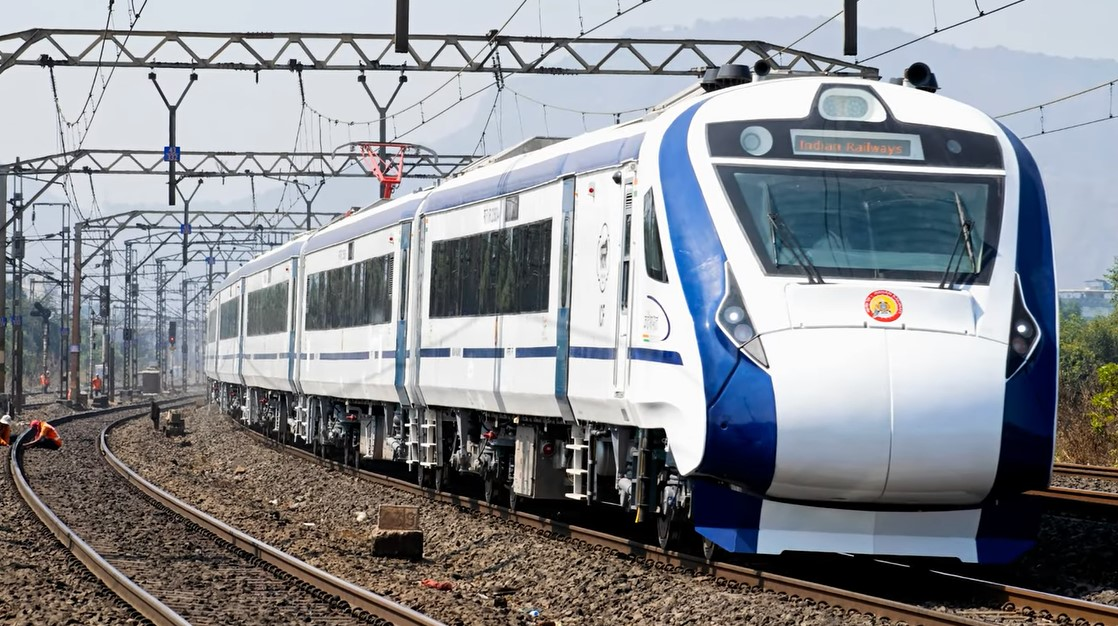
A Vande Bharat Express heading towards Mumbai.

Indian Railways has recently introduced a semi-high-speed EMU named Vande Bharat Express, capable of running at 183 km/h (114 mph). And it continues to use diesel and electric multiple units on its national network. EMUs serve all suburban and rapid transit lines.

=== Southeast Asia ===
==== Indonesia ====
Indonesia has used diesel since 1976 and electric MUs since 1925. Most of these MUs were built in Japan.

==== Philippines ====
The Manila Railroad Company (MRR) acquired its first multiple units in the 1930s. The locally built MC class was initially powered by gasoline and later converted to diesel during World War II. Both the MRR and its successor, the Philippine National Railways (PNR), have since acquired various classes of diesel multiple units. All multiple units owned by MRR, and all older MUs of the PNR, were built by Japanese firms. On the other hand, its newer rolling stock was built in South Korea and Indonesia. There will also be DMUs that will be built in China.

The first electric multiple units were acquired in 1984 for the LRT Line 1 built by La Brugeoise et Nivelles in Belgium. The first EMUs to be used outside of rapid transit will enter service between 2021 and 2022.

=== North America ===
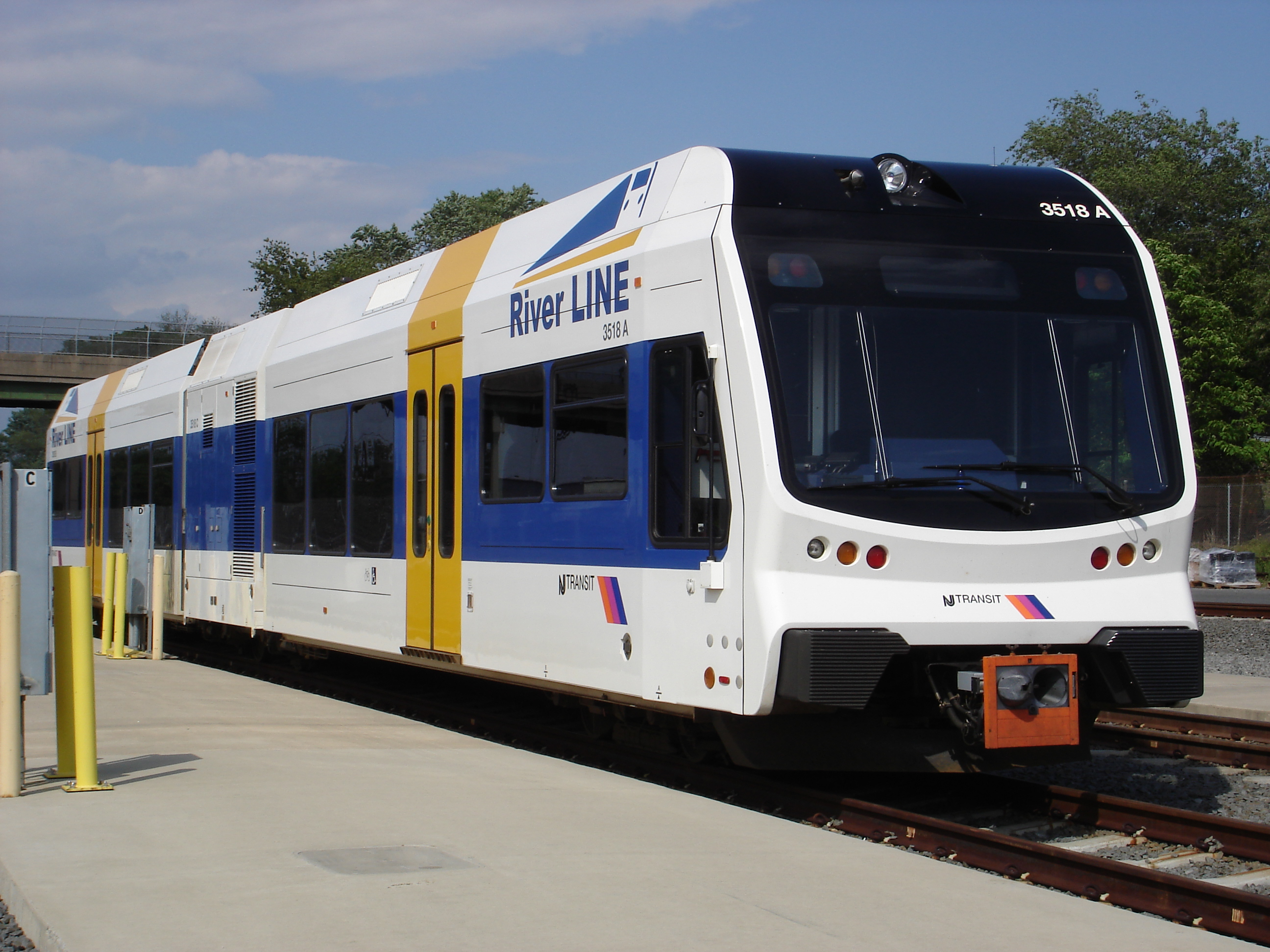
New Jersey transit Stadler GTW DMU used on the River Line

Most trains in North America are locomotive-hauled and use Multiple Unit (MU) control to control multiple locomotives. The leading locomotive's control system connects to the other locomotives, so the engineer's controls are replicated on all additional locomotives. Multi-core cables connect the locomotives.The Railway Technical Website, vol. US Locomotive MU Control. This does not make these locomotives MUs for this article. See, locomotive consist.

However, commuters, rapid transit, and light rail operations make extensive use of MUs. Most electrically powered trains are MUs.

The Southeastern Pennsylvania Transportation Authority (SEPTA) Regional Rail Division uses EMUs almost exclusively— the exception being some of its peak express service. New Jersey Transit service on the Northeast Corridor Line is split between electric locomotives and EMUs.

M2, M4, M6 and M8 EMUs which operate on the New Haven Line of Metro-North Railroad, are "multi-system" meaning they can draw power from either the third rail or from overhead lines. This allows operation under the wires between Pelham, NY and New Haven, CT, a section of track owned by Metro-North but shared with Amtrak's Northeast Corridor service, and on third rail between Pelham and Grand Central Terminal. EMUs are used on AMT's Montreal/Deux-Montagnes line.

DMUs are less common, partly because new light-rail operations are almost entirely electric, with many commuter routes already electrified, and also because of the difficulties posed by Federal Railroad Administration rules that limit their use on shared passenger/freight corridors. When the Budd RDC was developed following World War II, it was adopted for many secondary passenger routes in the United States (especially on the Boston and Maine Railroad) and Canada. These operations generally survived longer in Canada, but several were abandoned in the Via Rail cutbacks of the early 1990s. One that survives is Victoria - Courtenay train on Vancouver Island. DMU use in Canada has been resurrected in recent years, beginning with the opening of Union Pearson Express in 2015.

While most DMUs need to comply with strict FRA crash requirements for simultaneous operation with freight railways, European-style DMUs are used with timesharing arrangements on several rail lines, including the RiverLINE in New Jersey. Only a handful of manufacturers in the United States produce or have produced FRA-compliant DMUs, including Colorado Railcar (now US Railcar) and Nippon Sharyo/Sumitomo Corporation. NJ Transit has experimented with this DMU on the Princeton Branch line. In August 2006, it was announced that Amtrak wants the State of Vermont to experiment with DMUs on the state-subsidized Vermonter line from New Haven north to St. Albans to replace the less efficient diesel locomotive trainsets currently used.

MU streetcars were used in Toronto by the Toronto Transportation Commission (later Toronto Transit Commission) from 1949 to 1966, using 100 PCC A-7 built by St. Louis Car Company and Canadian Car and Foundry. These two car units ran along the Bloor Street route only beginning in 1950 and ceased operations after the opening of the Bloor–Danforth subway line in 1966. The A-7 units were later converted to single use.

== See also ==
- Diesel multiple unit
- Power car
- Rail terminology
- Twin unit

== Notes ==
- Martin, T. Commerford (1924). Kaempffert, Waldemar Bernhard (ed.). A Popular History of American Invention. Vol. 1. London; New York: Charles Scribner's Sons. pp. 122–123 – via Internet Archive.
