= Colorado Railcar =

US manufacturer of railroad rolling stock

Colorado Railcar Manufacturing, LLC
- Industry: Railcar manufacturing
- Founded: 1988
- Founder: Tom Rader
- Defunct: 2008
- Fate: Liquidated
- Successor: US Railcar
- Products: Passenger cars Diesel multiple units

Colorado Railcar was a manufacturer of railroad rolling stock—railcars and diesel multiple unit commuter vehicles. Both products came in single- and double-level versions. It shut down in 2008, with its assets being purchased by US Railcar.

== History ==
The company was first organized as Rader Railcar. Founded by Tom Rader in 1988, the company changed its name to Colorado Railcar in November 1997.

Rader and his company were featured in the PBS-aired documentary Dome Car Magic in 2006.

In 2008, it was announced that sometime in 2007 TriMet had to directly pay Colorado Railcar's suppliers in order to financially support the company.

On December 23, 2008, Colorado Railcar ceased operations, and creditors began dissolving the company after a "major liquidity problem". The shut-down was at least partially caused by the State of Vermont's cancellation of a deal to buy several DMUs for the Vermonter train.

In 2009, private investors affiliated with Value Recovery Group, Inc. (VRG) of Columbus, Ohio, led by Barry H. Fromm, acquired the Colorado Railcar DMU and remaining assets. A new company, US Railcar, was established, appointing Michael P. Pracht its president and CEO. US Railcar planned to resume production of Colorado Railcar products in a new manufacturing facility located in the Midwest (likely American Railcar's plant in Paragould, Arkansas).

== Products ==
Colorado Railcar had two main product categories:

=== Tourism coaches ===
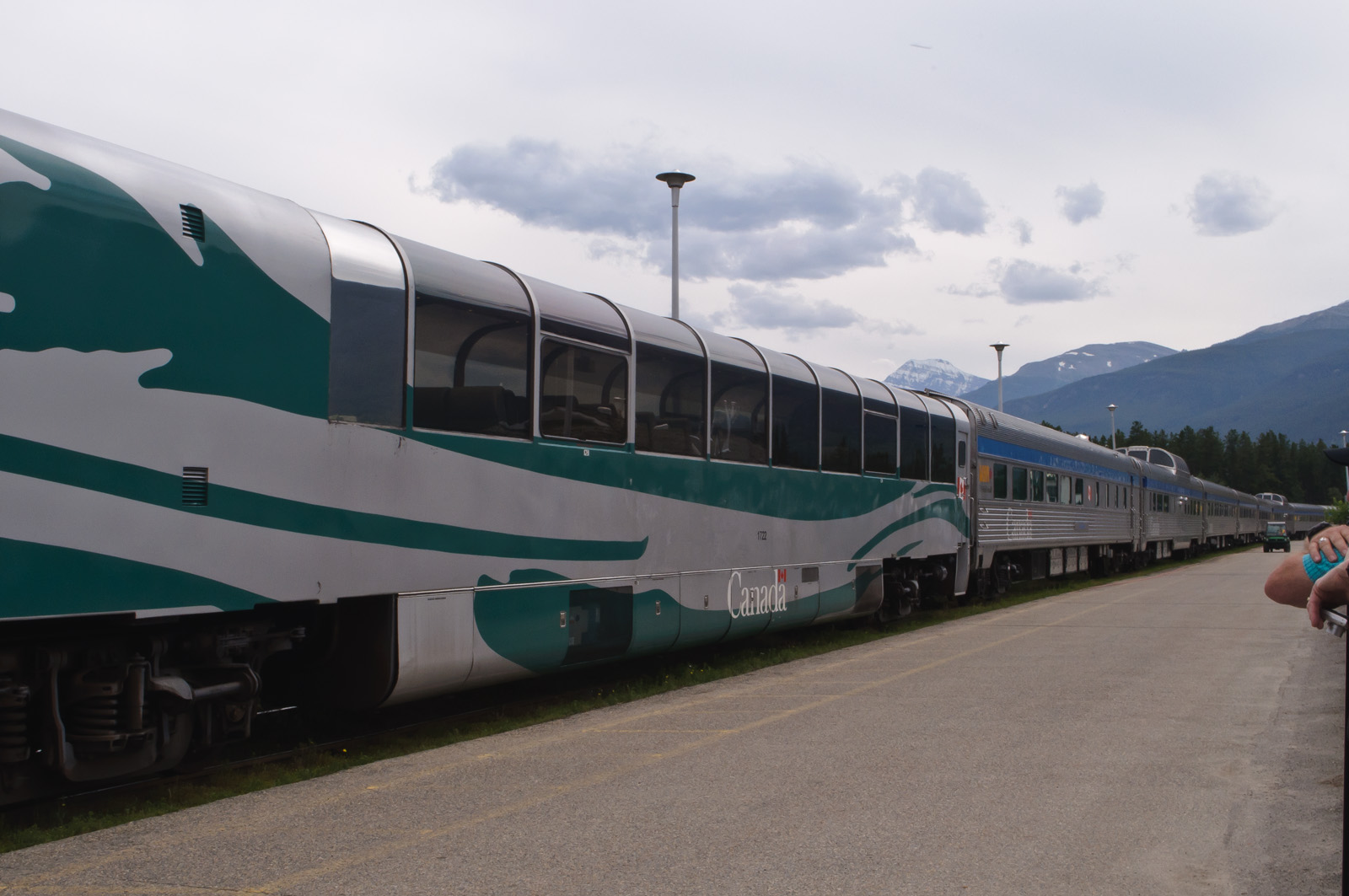
A Single-Level Dome on Via Rail's Canadian in 2012

These cars were primarily marketed for "luxury daytour trains, to trans-continental sleeper trains, dinner trains, business cars for Class I railroads".

Models included the double-deck Ultra Dome railcar, the Single-Level Dome railcar, single and bilevel sleeping cars, entertainment cars, dining cars and custom cars. These cars are in use by American Orient Express, Princess Tours, Alaska Railroad, Rocky Mountaineer, and Holland America Line (formerly "Westours"). The Ultra Dome cars are "glass-domed, bilevel cars 89 feet (27 m) long and 18 feet (5.5 m) high, and seat up to 88 passengers".

The concept of a glass "dome car" was a product of luxury streamlining in the 1940s and 50s in the United States. The reintroduction of this styling for the 21st century by CR has proven popular thus far.

=== Mass transit DMUs ===
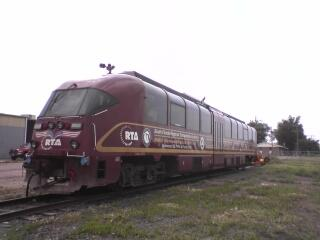
Single-level DMU demonstrator

Colorado Railcar had designed two prototypes, one being a bilevel rail car, the other single level. The self-propelled vehicles can pull two other coaches with their two 600 horsepower (450 kW) Detroit Diesel engines. The single-level vehicles can carry up to 92 passengers, 188 for the bilevels. Colorado Railcar had offered non-powered single and bilevel commuter coaches that had a high level of parts commonality with the DMU offerings.

Around 2003, the company's DMU was being touted, as part of the Regional Transportation District FasTracks program, as a possible solution for the proposed Northwest Rail commuter line between Denver's Union Station and Boulder. The demonstration car was displayed at several locations for the public to visit, and the possibility of doing business with an in-state company seemed an added bonus and point of pride.

The Colorado Railcar DMU was targeted towards starter commuter rail operators with smaller passenger volumes desiring to operate shorter trains, often comparable to light rail, and with less extensive maintenance facilities. A DMU car could also pull two unpowered coach cars in addition to itself. The DMU complies with 49 CFR 229, commonly known as the Crashworthiness Regulation, which dictates construction of locomotives and multiple-unit vehicles used on trackage shared with freight trains. This regulation precludes the operation of virtually all of the DMU's competitors, without a special waiver from the Federal Railroad Administration.

In January 2005, Colorado Railcar announced the sale of one DMU and two coaches to Great Canadian Railtour, targeted for spring 2006 delivery for its North Vancouver/Whistler route.

Florida Tri-Rail received a grant from the U.S. Department of Transportation to test the DMU vehicles. Contracted in 2003 and completed in 2005, a bi-level DMU demonstrator and matching bi-level coach entered regular revenue service with Tri-Rail in October 2006. In mid-2007, Tri-Rail acquired three more bi-level DMUs and an additional bi-level non-powered coach. As of 2012, the DMUs are retired.

In 2008, Colorado Railcar also delivered three DMUs (and one unpowered coach) to TriMet for use on the WES Commuter Rail line between Beaverton and Wilsonville, Oregon; an additional bi-level DMU to the South Florida Regional Transportation Authority; and one bi-level DMU to the Alaska Railroad to be used for a new passenger rail service serving the Chugach National Forest. Upon delivery of the DMUs to SFRTA and AKRR, Colorado Railcar ceased operations and now is US Railcar.

=== Other products ===
In addition to their main products, in 2006, Colorado Railcar also collaborated with ENSCO and Plasser & Theurer to build FRA DOTX 219 and 220, a pair of track geometry cars that entered service with the Federal Railroad Administration in 2007.
