= Single-Level Dome =

Type of dome car with a single-level layout

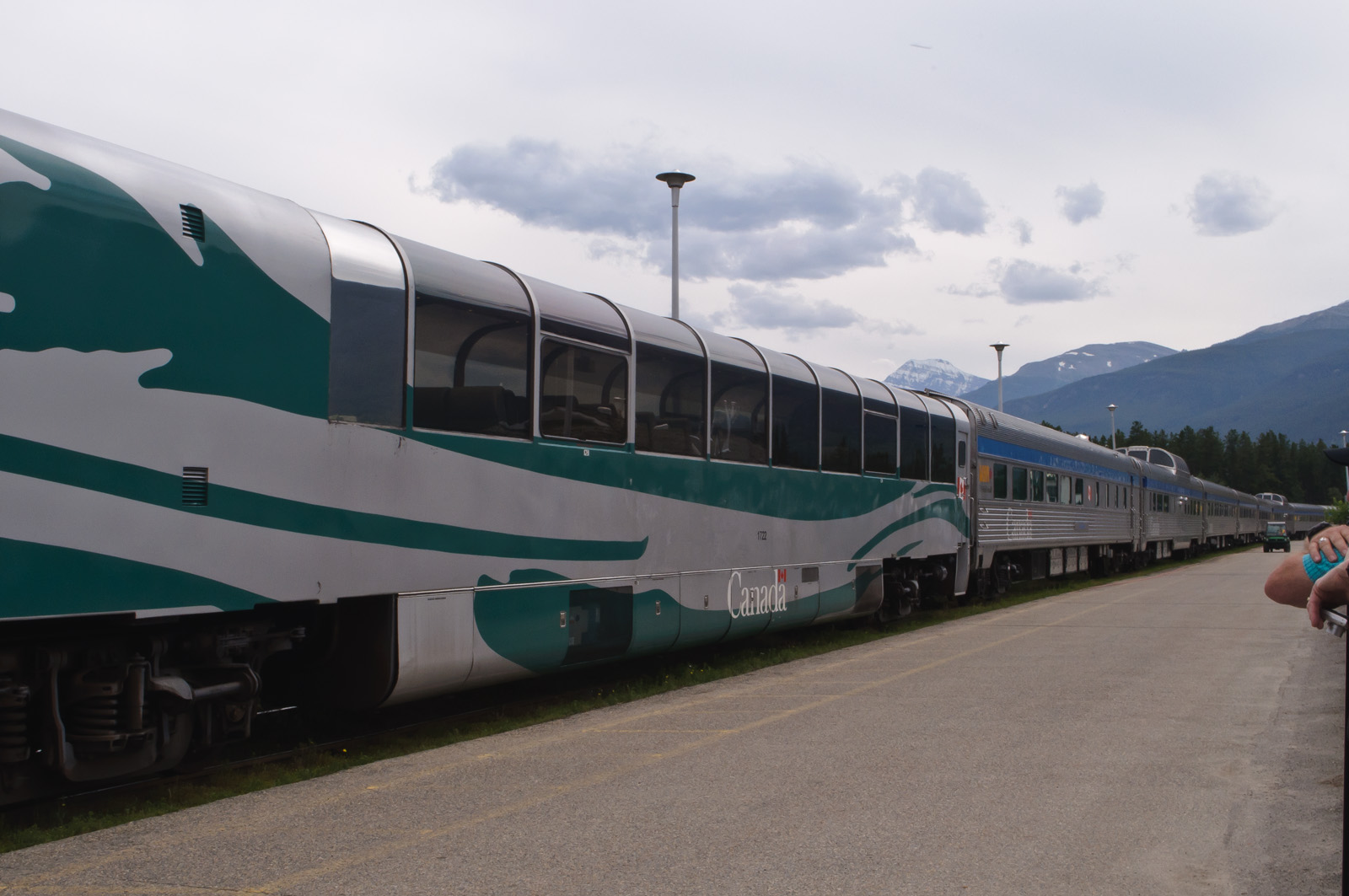
- A Panorama Dome on Via Rail's Canadian in 2012

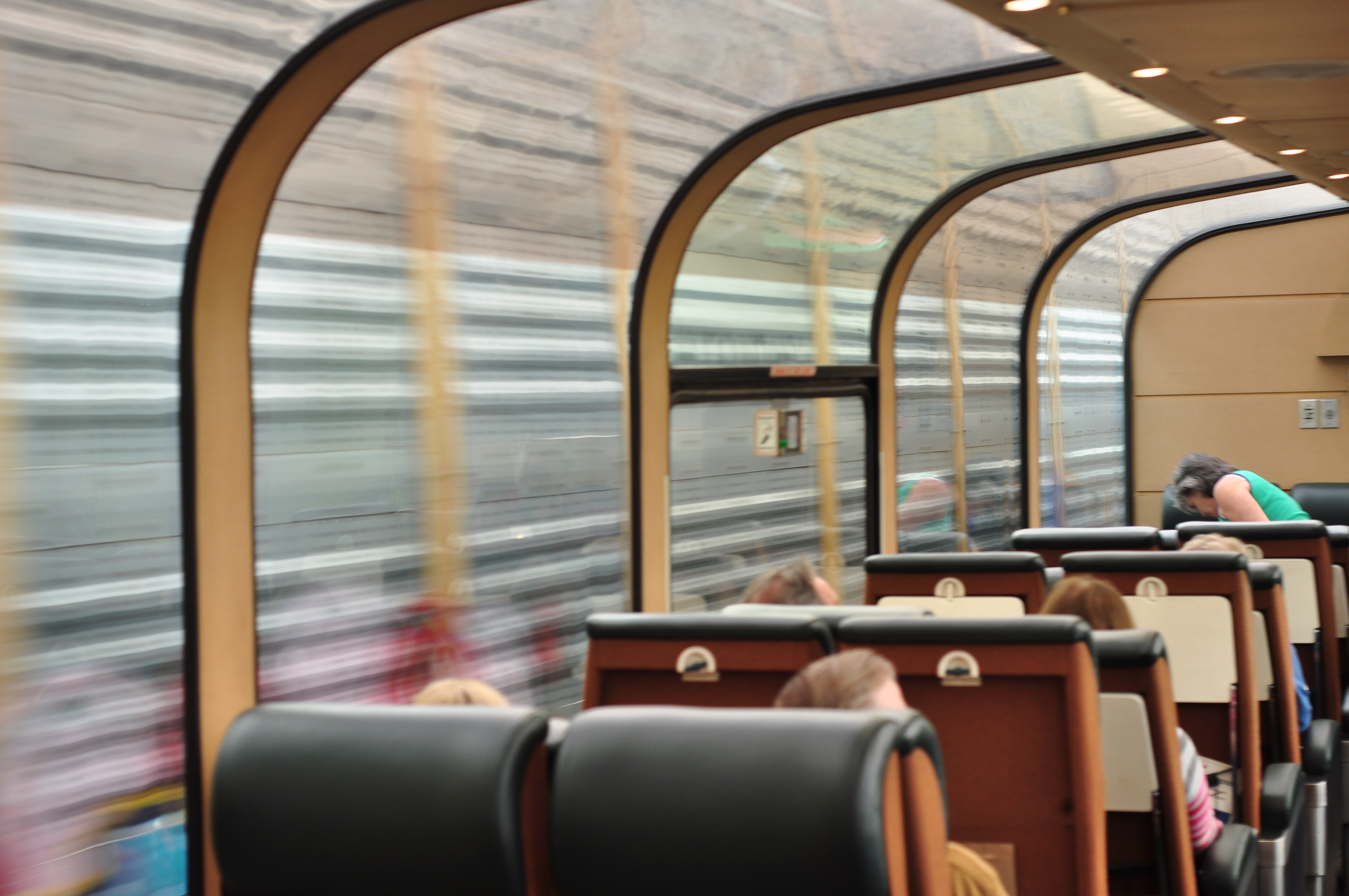
- Interior of a Panorama Dome on the Canadian in 2014
- Manufacturer: Colorado Railcar
- Constructed: 1997–2007
- Entered service: 1997
- Number built: 11
- Capacity: Maximum 76 passengers
- Operators: Florida Fun Train (1997–1998); Alaska Railroad (1999–present); BC Rail (2000–2002); Via Rail (2002–present)

Specifications
- Car body construction: Corten steel
- Car length: 85 feet (26 m)
- Height: 12 feet 11 inches (3.94 m)

The Single-Level Dome, also known as the Panorama Dome, is a type of dome coach manufactured by Colorado Railcar for various operators between 1997–2007. They are similar in concept to the company's bilevel Ultra Domes.

== Design ==
Each window on the Single-Level Dome is 6 feet (180 cm) by 7 feet 8 inches (234 cm); Colorado Railcar claimed they were the "world's largest glass domed windows." In a lounge configuration the cars can seat up to 76 at "four tops" (tables with 2 × 2 seating). Via Rail's three cars can seat 71–74 in a standard coach configuration. The interior color scheme for the Florida cars was "aquas, pinks and light green." The windows begin at "thigh level" and curve at the top, constituting "most of the ceiling." The Peninsula Clarion described the view as "panoramic".

== Operation ==
The first five cars were built for the Florida Fun Train, a short-lived service between South Florida and Orlando, Florida. These included four coaches and a lounge car with an open platform. The Florida Fun Train folded in September 1998. The Alaska Railroad acquired all five cars at bankruptcy in 1999. One of these cars was rebuilt as a business car, the Aurora. The Alaska Railroad purchased an additional three cars in 2006–2007, bringing their total to eight.

BC Rail acquired three more of the domes (intended for Florida) in 2000. After BC Rail ceased passenger operations in 2002 they were acquired by Via Rail. Dubbed "Panorama Domes", they remain in service. As of 2018 two of the cars operate between Edmonton, Alberta, and Vancouver, British Columbia, on the flagship Canadian, while the third runs on the Jasper–Prince Rupert train between Jasper, Alberta, and Prince George, British Columbia.

== See also ==
- Ultra Dome
