= Ultra Dome =

Bilevel dome train coach by Colorado Railcar

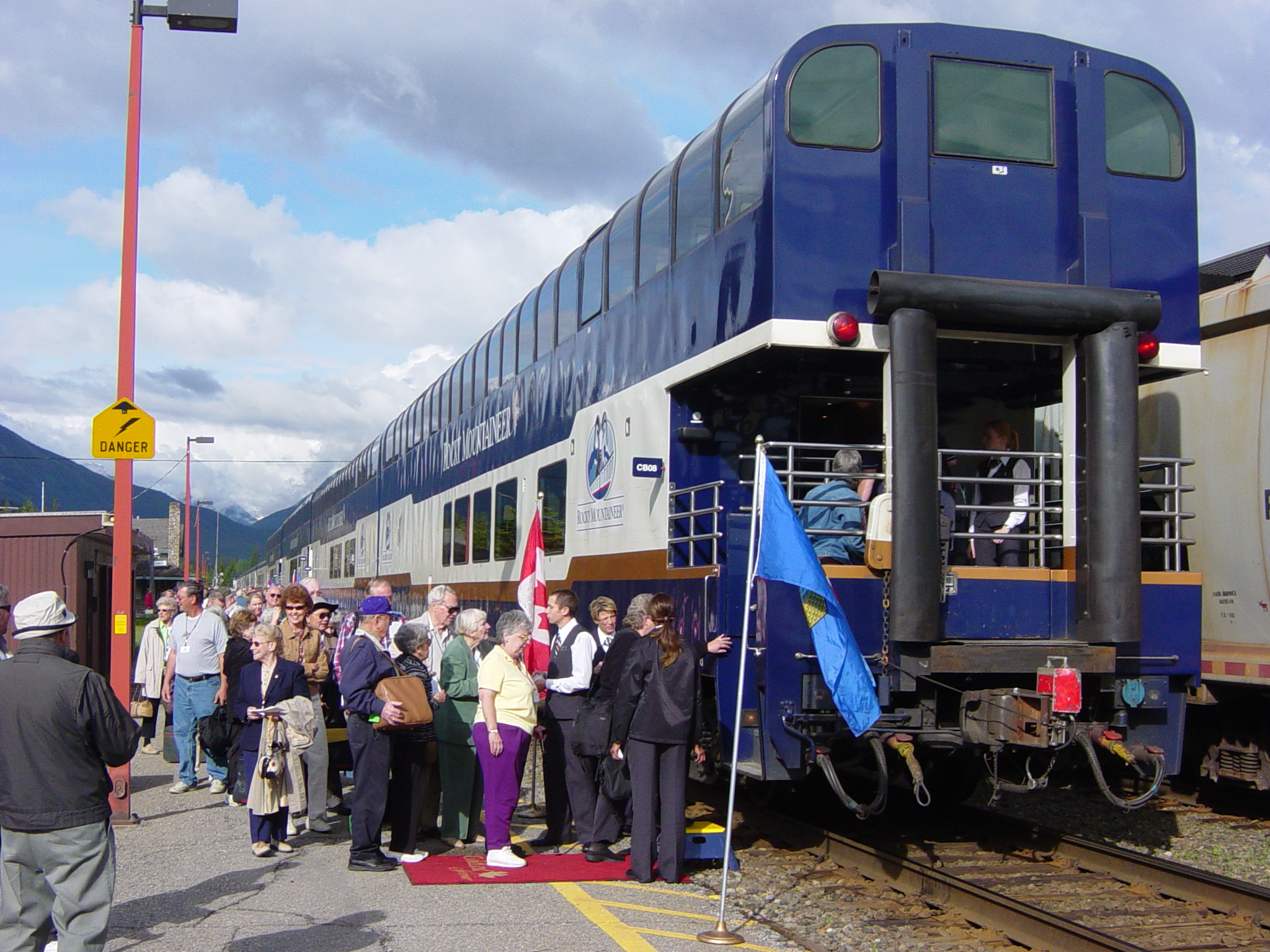
- A Rocky Mountaineer Ultra Dome at Banff in 2005

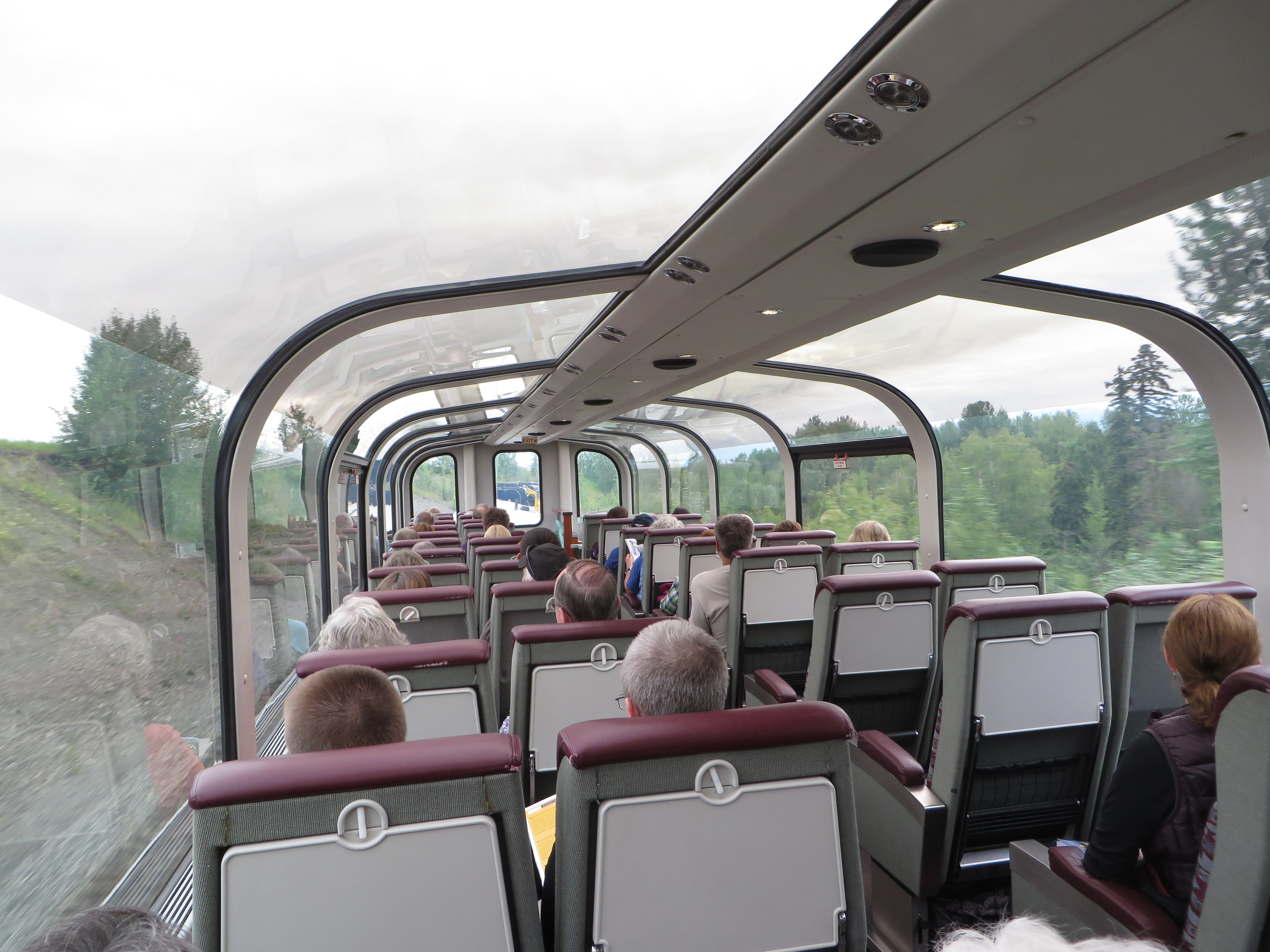
- Interior of an Alaska Railroad Ultra Dome in 2014
- Manufacturer: Colorado Railcar
- Constructed: 1988–2007
- Entered service: 1988
- Number built: 44
- Capacity: Maximum 88 (upper level)
- Operators: Princess Tours; Holland America Lines; Alaska Railroad; Rocky Mountaineer; Royal Celebrity

Specifications
- Car body construction: Corten steel
- Car length: 85 feet (26 m)
- Height: 18 feet (5.5 m)
- Weight: 203,000 pounds (92,000 kg)

The Ultra Dome is a bilevel dome coach manufactured by Colorado Railcar for various operators between 1988–2007. Colorado Railcar, and its predecessor Rader Railcar, constructed a total of 44 cars. All 44 were purchased by touring companies in Alaska and Canada. At the time of their construction their dome areas featured the largest individual glass panes ever installed in a railcar.

== Background ==
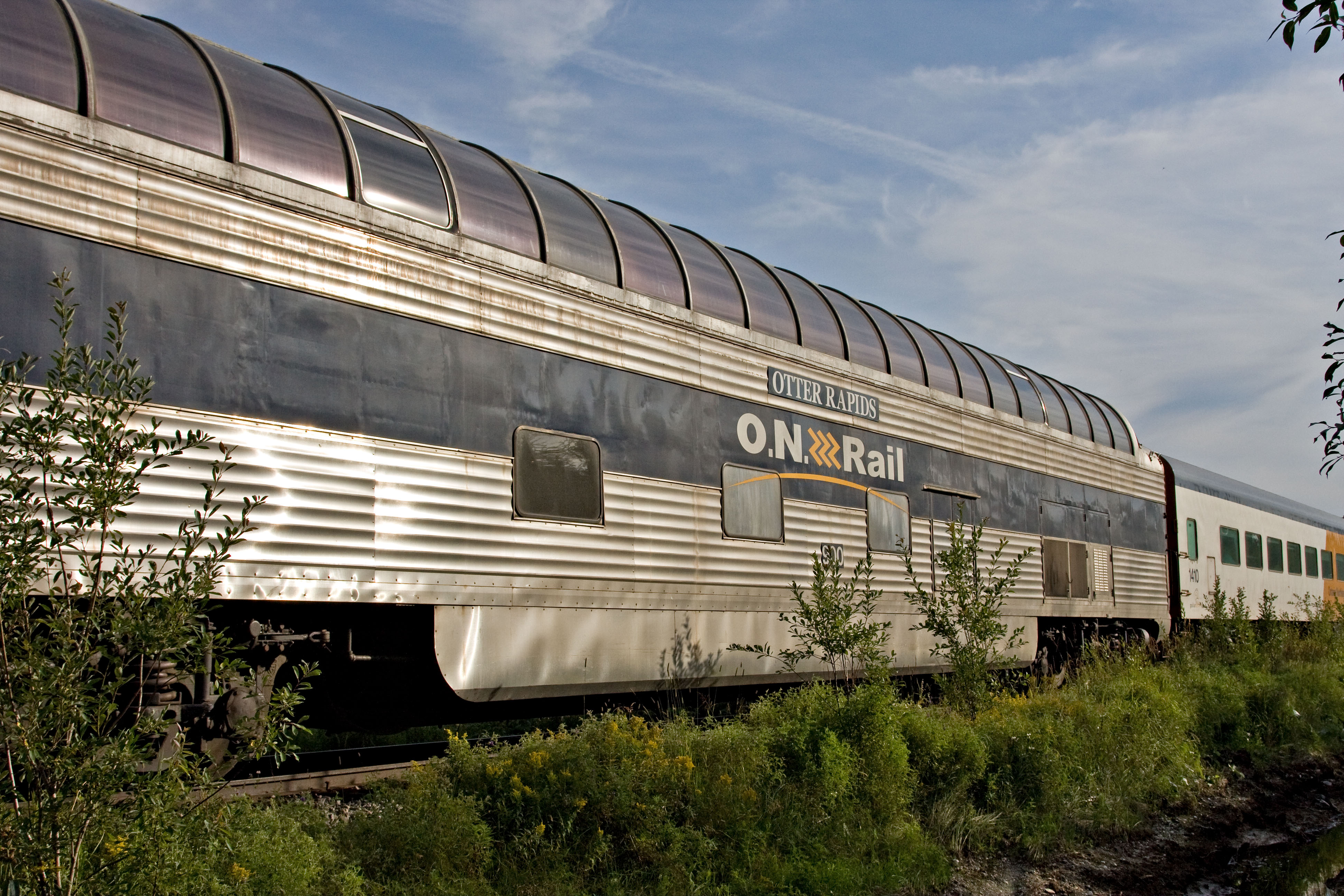
An Ontario Northland Railway Super Dome in 2008

The Ultra Domes were the brainchild of Thomas G. Rader, an American railway entrepreneur. Rader worked for the Holland America Line in Alaska and developed an idea to use trains in conjunction with the cruise lines to promote tourism in the state. In 1982, Rader acquired five former Chicago, Milwaukee, St. Paul and Pacific Railroad ("Milwaukee Road") Super Domes, originally built by Pullman-Standard in 1952. Four were rebuilt by American Car and Foundry (ACF) and placed into service in 1983 as the Midnight Sun Express. Passengers from Cunard Line cruise ships boarded the cars (attached to an existing Alaska Railroad train) in Anchorage, Alaska and hauled to Denali National Park. On-board services were maintained to a high level, similar to that of a cruise ship. The service expanded in 1984 to include Princess Cruises and Rader's old employer the Holland America Line. Rader sold out to Princess Cruises in 1986 but recognized there was a substantial growth opportunity. Using the proceeds from the sale, he founded Rader Railcar to produce new dome cars for service in Alaska and elsewhere.

== Design ==
The Ultra Domes vary in specifics depending on the operator. Common features include 6 by 6 feet (180 by 180 cm) windows. The total square footage between the two levels is 3,080 square feet (286 m^{2}), 40-60% greater than a single-level car. The maximum passenger capacity on the upper level is 88. In 2001 the starting price for an Ultra Dome was US$2.5 million. Eight of the Princess cars were equipped with kitchens, and all ten had dining areas with seating for 32. The windows in the dining area are 5 feet (150 cm) tall. The glass panes in the dome area were, at the time of their installation, the largest individual panes ever installed in a railcar.

== Operation ==
All 44 Ultra Domes were acquired by tourist operations in Alaska and Canada. Princess Tours acquired ten Ultra Domes between 1988–1999 at a cost of US$14.3 million. The cars were refurbished in 2005. Holland America, which had acquired many of the former Super Domes, purchased ten Ultra Domes itself between 2003–2005. In 2001 Celebrity Cruises and Royal Caribbean created a joint venture named Royal Celebrity to operate the Wilderness Express and purchased four Ultra Domes. The Alaska Railroad, which hauled the trains, bought four of its own between 2005–2007. The Canadian tourist operator Rocky Mountaineer is the single largest operator, with sixteen Ultra Domes.

== See also ==
- Single-Level Dome

== Gallery ==
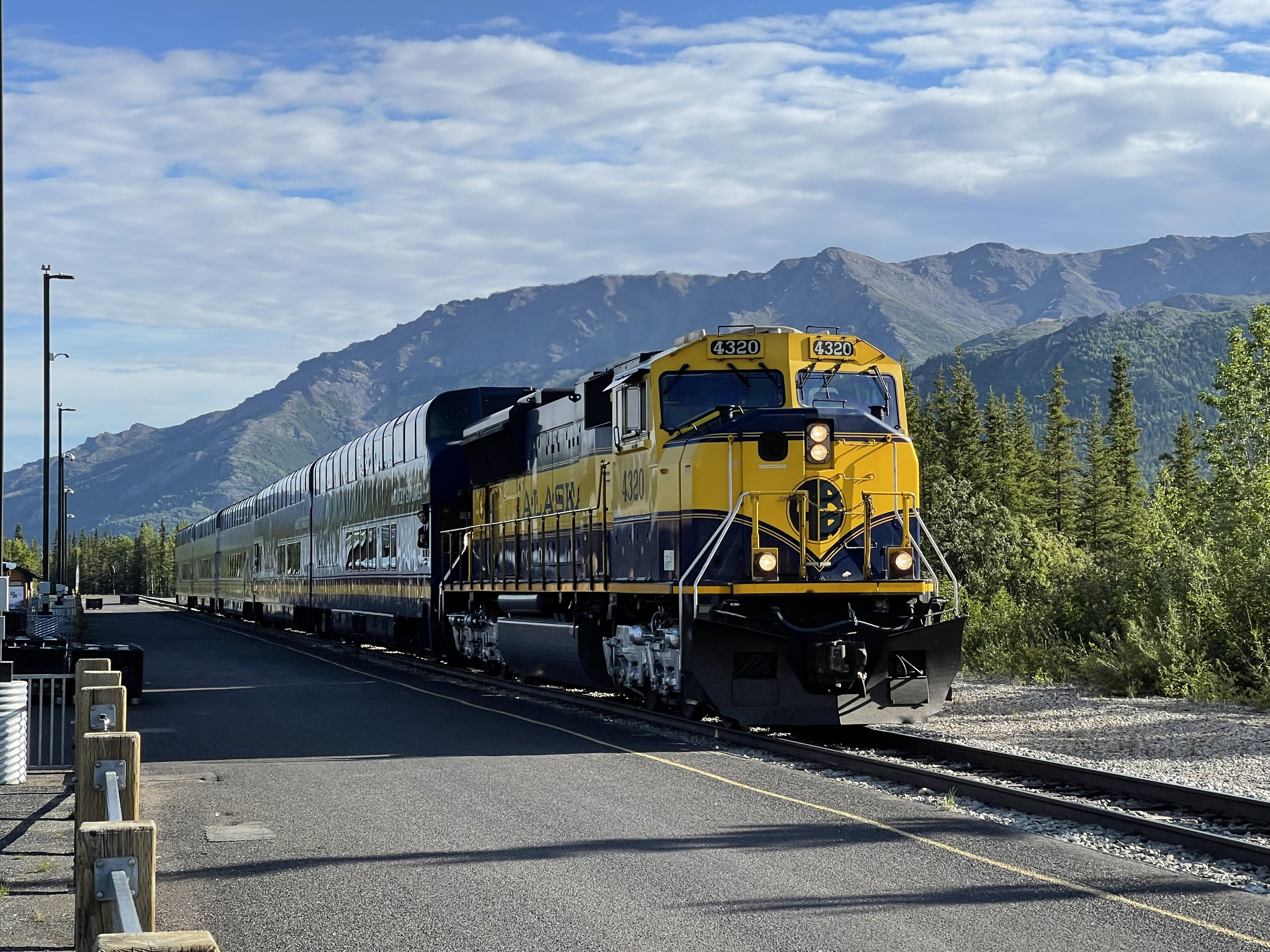
Alaska Railroad passenger train at the Denali National Park depot.

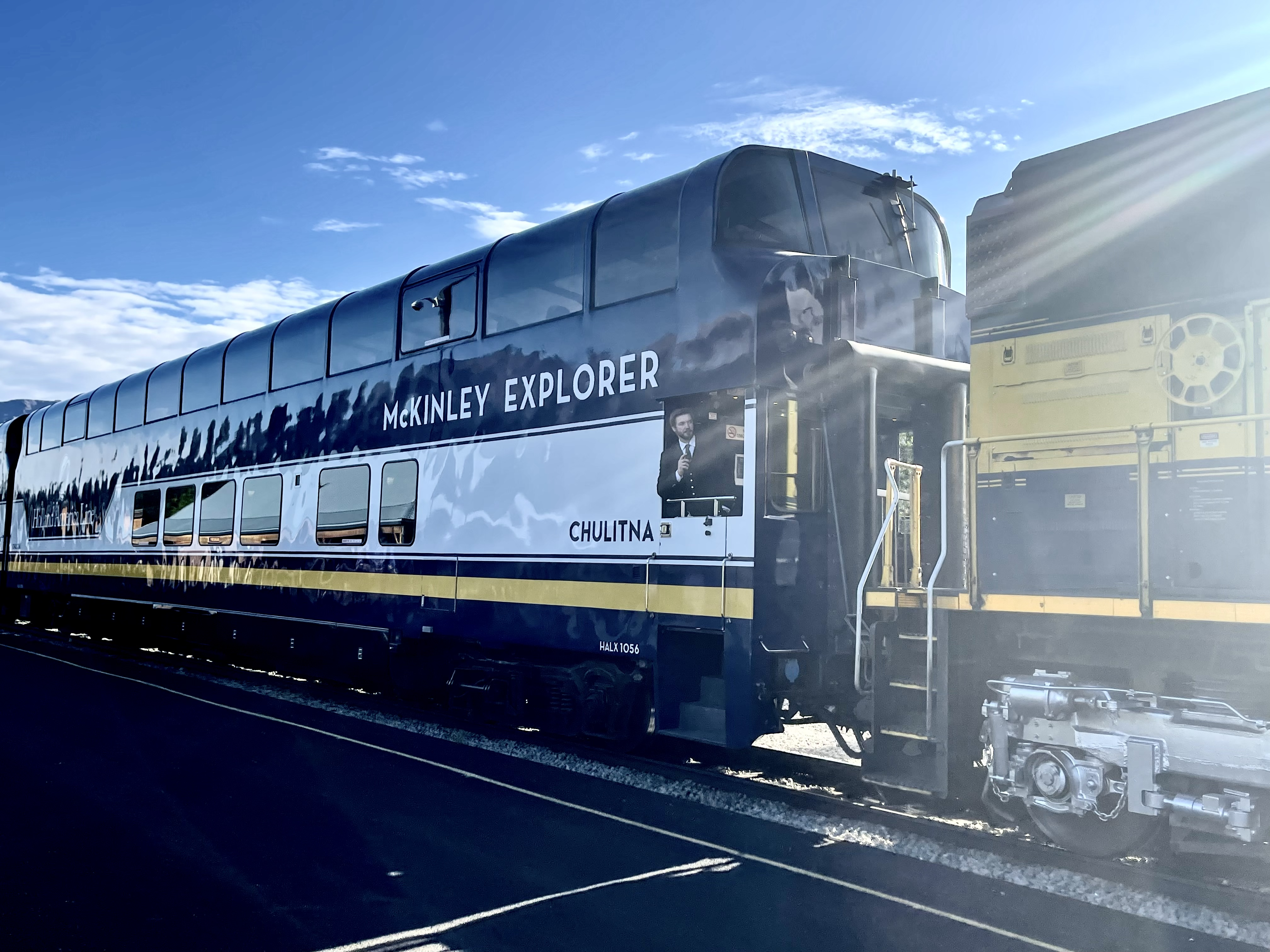
Alaska Railroad train Ultra Dome Car at the Denali National Park depot.

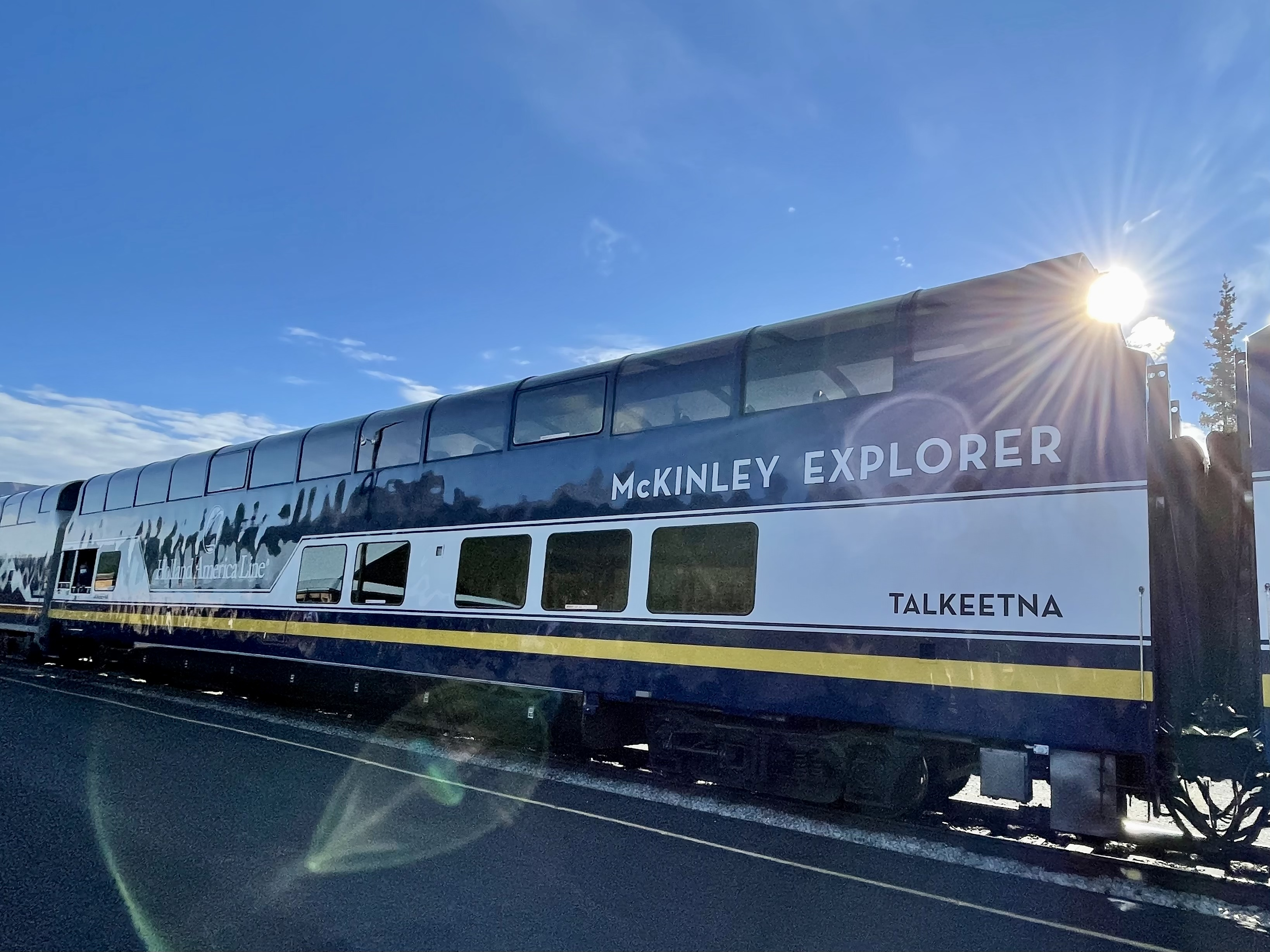
Alaska Railroad passenger train Ultra Dome Car at the Denali National Park depot.

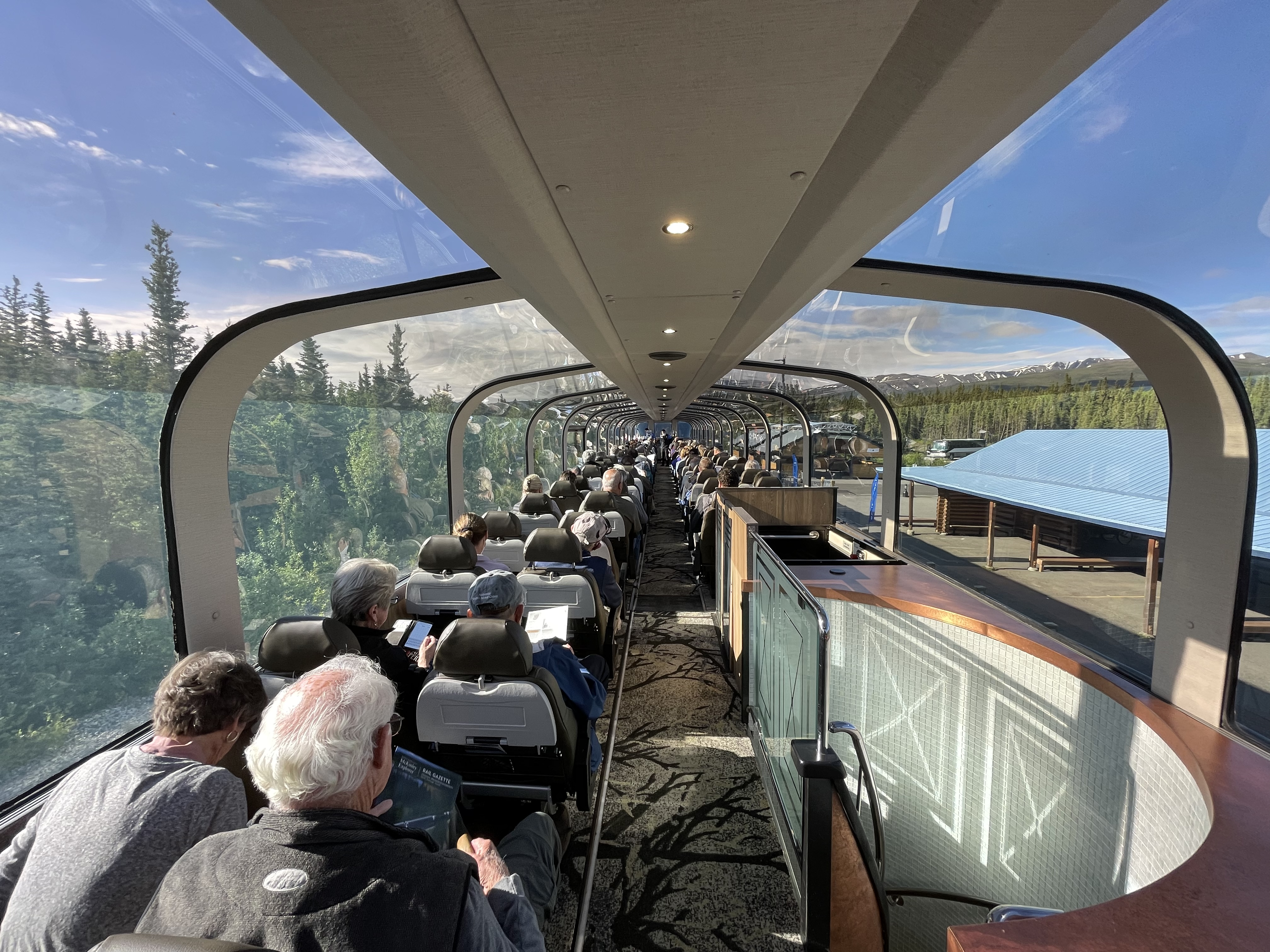
Interior of an Alaska Railroad train Ultra Dome Car at the Denali National Park.
