= Princess Tours =

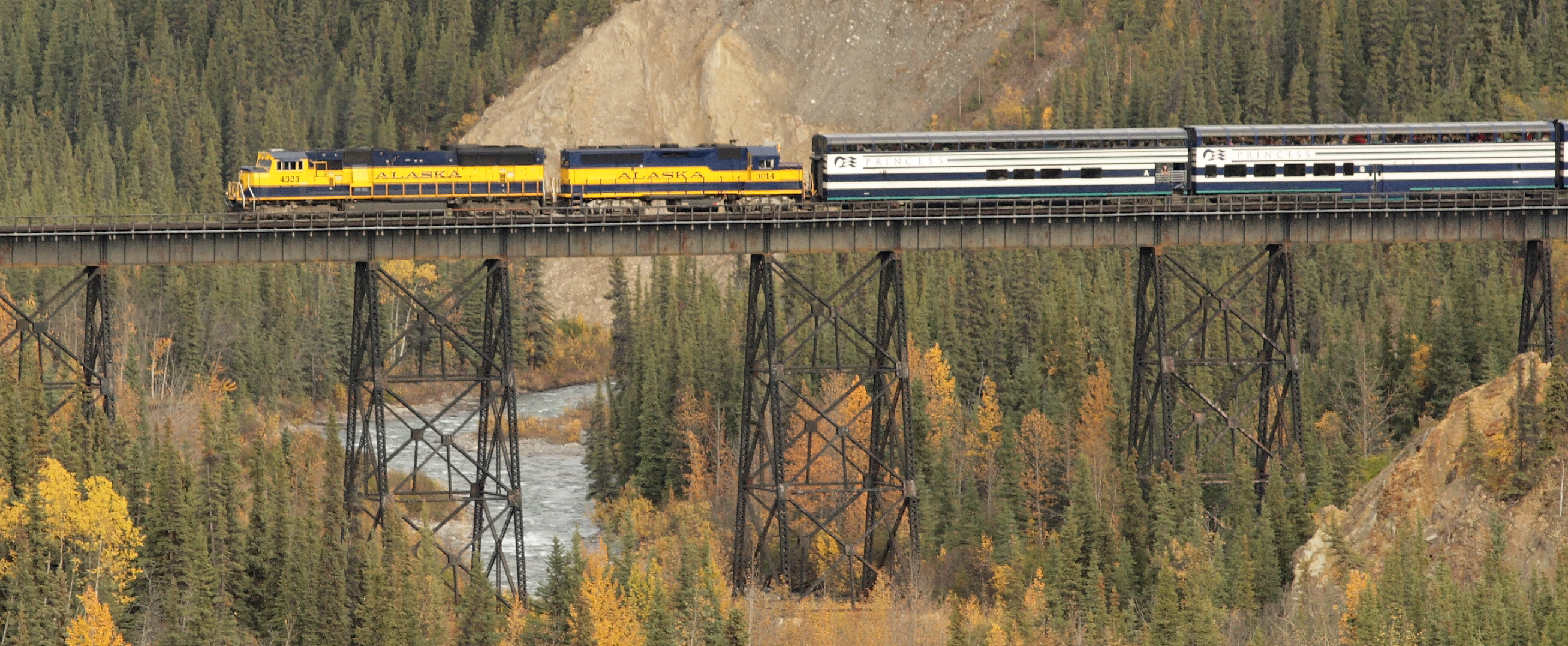
A Princess Tours train in 2007.

Princess Tours is an Alaskan sightseeing passenger car service owned by Princess Cruises and operated by its Rail Division. Princess Tours runs ten cars a day (five north, five south) from Anchorage to Fairbanks on the Alaska Railroad, stopping at Talkeetna, Denali, and occasionally Whittier. Each train consists of five cars and is staffed by a crew of 32 people.

== About Princess ==
Princess Tours, a division of Princess Cruises, is responsible for the operation of Alaska Land Tours and the land portion of Cruisetours. Founded in 1972 and headquartered in Seattle, Washington, the company offers a wide variety of Alaska Land Tours in conjunction with Princess' Alaska cruises.

The largest cruise and tour operator in Alaska, Princess Tours gives travelers the opportunity to combine a Gulf of Alaska cruise with the interior of Alaska. The “land” portion of the cruisetours include Anchorage, Denali National Park, Copper River, the Kenai Peninsula, Prudhoe Bay, the Arctic villages of Nome and Kotzebue and the Canadian Yukon.

Princess Tours also owns and operates five wilderness lodge properties and hotels, a fleet of motorcoaches and luxury rail cars, known as Princess Rail.

== Princess rail tour ==
Traveling daily between Anchorage and Fairbanks from May through September, the Ultra Dome cars feature the largest domed windows ever built for a rail car, dining salons, and the only open-air outdoor observation platforms on the Alaska Railroad.

== Equipment ==
Thomas G. Rader started the cruise operation “Alaska Tour Operators” in 1982. The operation was renamed “Tour Alaska” the following year in conjunction with the purchase of four ex- Chicago, Milwaukee, St. Paul and Pacific Railroad ("Milwaukee Road") Super Domes. These cars held 60 passengers each and featured fine dining on board.

In 1986, P&O Princess Cruises purchased Tour Alaska, and in 1988 replaced the Super Domes with four new Ultra Dome cars, rebuilt by Rader from Pullman Gallery Cars which had been used on the San Francisco-San Jose Peninsula Commute by Southern Pacific until 1985. These are the cars in use today. The cars came in pairs and shared a kitchen which cooked for the dining rooms downstairs. In 1992, Princess Tours commissioned two new cars to be built, which were introduced for the 1993 season. These cars, as well as the cars built in 1996 and 1999, are all self-contained and can operate independently from the others, unlike the earlier cars.

== Railcar classifications ==
Number	Style	Seating	Built
7080	Coach/Kitchen	88/32	1988
7081	Coach/Obs	84/32	1988
7082	Coach/Kitchen	88/32	1988
7083	Coach/Obs	84/32	1988
7084	Coach/Kitchen	88/32	1992
7085	Coach/Kitchen	88/32	1992
7086	Coach/Kitchen	88/32	1996
7087	Coach/Kitchen	88/32	1996
7088	Coach/Kitchen	88/32	1999
7089	Coach/Kitchen	88/32	1999
