= US Railcar =

Rolling stock manufacturer

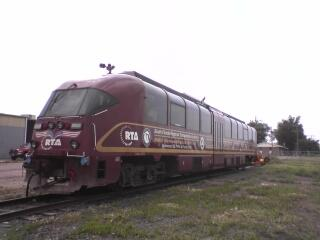
- Single-level DMU demonstrator
- Industry: Railcar manufacturing
- Founded: 2009
- Defunct: September 17, 2025
- Headquarters: Columbus, Ohio, USA
- Key people: Barry Fromm, president/CEO
- Products: Passenger cars, diesel multiple units
- Website: www.usrailcar.com

US Railcar was a manufacturer of railroad rolling stock, including passenger cars, and diesel multiple units. It was formed in 2009, and was the successor company to Colorado Railcar after that company shut down in December 2008. US Railcar ceased to exist on September 17th, 2025.

== History ==
US Railcar's predecessor, Colorado Railcar, ceased operations on 23 December 2008 because of a "major liquidity problem". The business remained closed until July 2009 when a group of investors, part of the Value Recovery Group (VRG), purchased the assets of Colorado Railcar and renamed the company US Railcar. The new company operated as a subsidiary of VRG, with the headquarters of both companies located in Columbus, Ohio.

On 18 February 2010, US Railcar announced that it had formed a joint venture with American Railcar Industries, dubbed US Railcar Company LLC, to better "design, manufacture, and sell Diesel Multiple Units." On 19 November 2010, however, the two companies announced the dissolution of the venture, citing "current market conditions" as the reason. The National Association of Railroad Passengers speculated that the cause of the failure of the joint venture was the cancellation of the proposed 3-C passenger corridor in Ohio. A Certificate of Cancellation for US Railcar Company, LLC was filed with the Ohio Secretary of State on September 17th, 2025.

== Products ==
US Railcar offered diesel multiple units in both single- and bi-level versions, as well as unpowered railcars in single- and bi-level versions. The single-level DMUs have a passenger capacity of 94, while the bi-level models can carry 188 passengers. Both types were equipped with two 600-horsepower (0.45 MW) Detroit Diesel engines for propulsion. The single-level railcars have a capacity of 102 people, while the bi-level cars can seat 218. The company also offered unpowered luxury railcars, marketed as the "Ultradome."

== See also ==
- List of rolling stock manufacturers
