= Stadler KISS =

Swiss bilevel commuter train

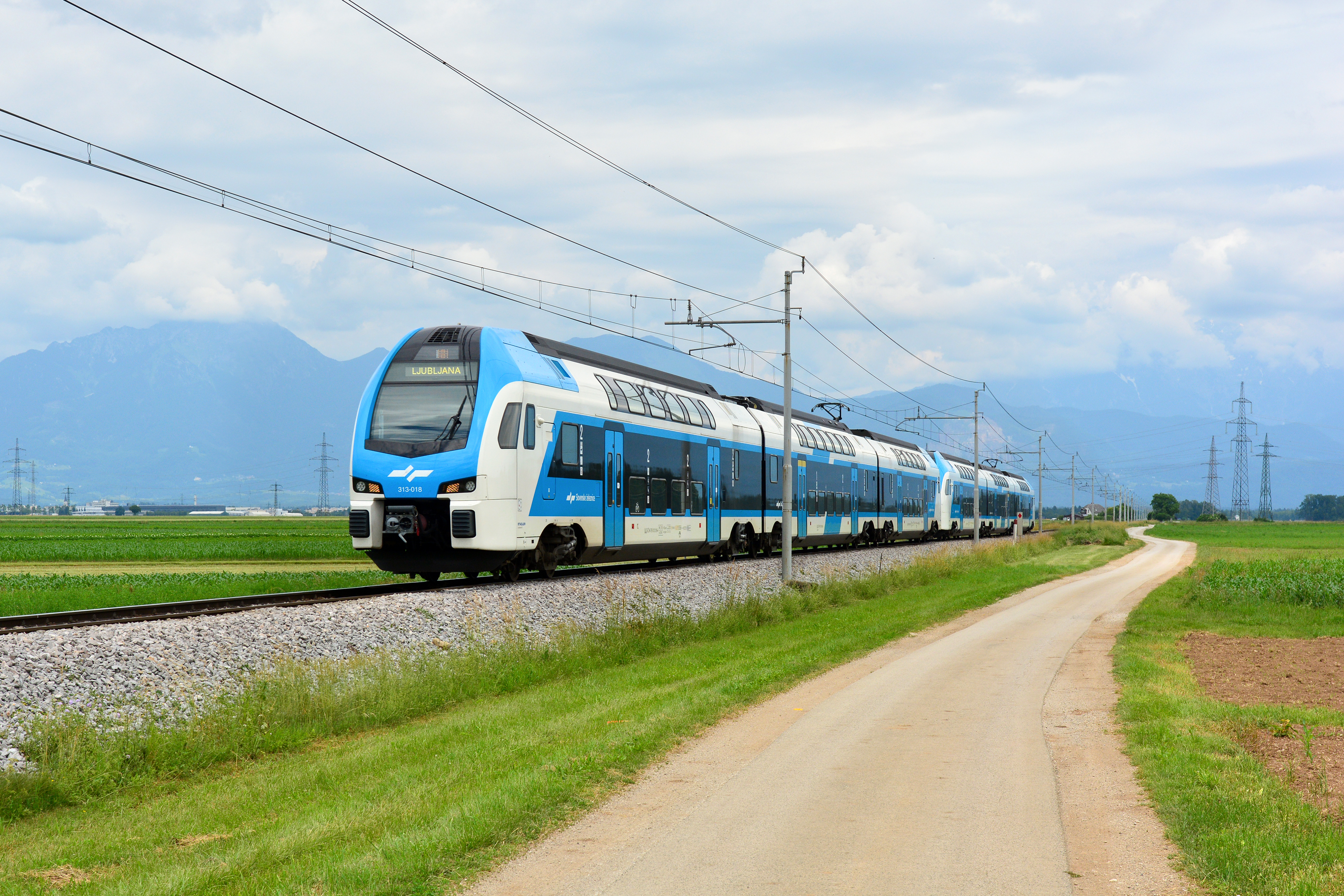
- Facelifted version in service with the Slovenian Railways near Škofja Loka, June 2023

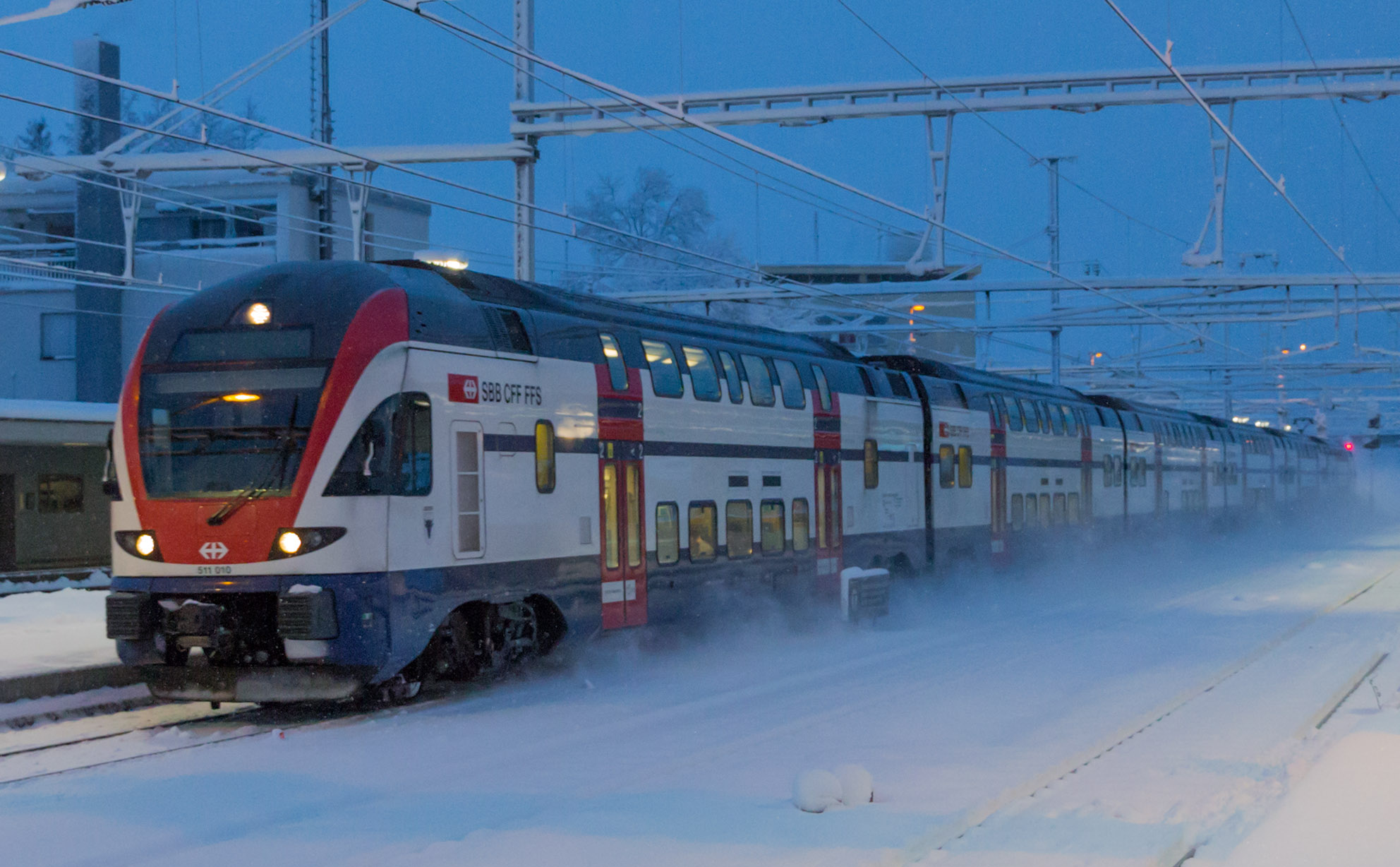
- Original version in service with the Zürich S-Bahn at Effretikon railway station, December 2014
- In service: 2011–present
- Manufacturer: Stadler Rail
- Built at: Switzerland: Altenrhein and Bussnang (Stadler Rail); Germany: Pankow, Berlin (Stadler Deutschland GmbH); Belarus: Fanipol (Stadler Rail Minsk) (Note: Production relocated to Siedlce following the Russian invasion of Ukraine); Poland: Siedlce (Stadler Rail Polska); Spain: Valencia (Stadler Rail Valencia SAU); United States: Salt Lake City, Utah (Stadler US)
- Constructed: 2008–
- Entered service: 2011
- Formation: EMUs: Up to 7 cars per train DMUs: 8 cars per train
- Fleet numbers: RABe 511, RABe 512 (SBB), RABe 515 (BLS)
- Capacity: First class: 112; Second class: 414

Specifications
- Car body construction: Aluminium
- Car length: 25 m (82 ft 1/4 in)
- Width: 2.8 m (9 ft 2 1/4 in) (2.92 m (9 ft 7 in) for Sweden; 3.4 m (11 ft 1 7/8 in) for Russia)
- Height: 4.595 m (15 ft 7/8 in) (4.7 m (15 ft 5 in) for Sweden; 5.24 m (17 ft 2 1/4 in) for Russia)
- Floor height: 440 mm (17 in)
- Entry: 570 mm (22 in)
- Maximum speed: 160–200 km/h (100–125 mph)
- Weight: 296 t (291 long tons; 326 short tons) (6 car train)
- Power output: 6,000 kW (8,000 hp) Max; 4,000 kW (5,400 hp) Cont
- Acceleration: 1.1 m/s^{2} (3.6 ft/s^{2})
- Electric systems: Overhead line: 3 kV DC; 15 kV 16.7 Hz AC; 25 kV 50/60 Hz AC
- Current collection: Pantograph
- Track gauge: 1,435 mm (4 ft 8 1/2 in); 1,520 mm (4 ft 11 27/32 in); 1,668 mm (5 ft 5 21/32 in)

The Stadler KISS is a family of bilevel electric multiple unit commuter trains developed and built since 2008 by Stadler Rail of Switzerland. As of 2025, around 700 KISS trainsets have been sold to operators in 14 countries. Boarding is done into the lower deck.

== Name ==
In the early stages of its development, the KISS was known as the Stadler DOSTO. This name was derived from the German word Doppelstock, meaning "double decker". This is still the name used for the Swedish market because "kiss" means "pee" in Swedish.

Since September 2010, Stadler refers to the train as "KISS", an acronym for "Komfortabler Innovativer Spurtstarker S-Bahn-Zug", meaning "comfortable, innovative, sprint-capable suburban train".

In Swiss Federal Railways (SBB) service, the train is classified as RABe 511, while a newer version for regional services is classified as RABe 512. BLS classifies them as RABe 515. For the Eastern European market (specifically in Russia, Georgia and Azerbaijan), it is branded Eurasia.

=== Naming of RABe 511 trains ===
A total of 93 RABe 511 trainsets (69 six-car/24 four-car units) were delivered to Swiss Federal Railways, numbered 511 001–511 093, some for use on the long-distance IR or RE lines (red-white-grey livery) and others on the Zurich S-Bahn network (red-white-blue livery) in the Zurich metropolitan area.

In Switzerland, it is common practice to name electric multiple units (e.g. SBB RABe 501, RABDe 500, RABe 514, SOB RABe 526, BLS RABe 515) and locomotives (e.g. SBB Ae 6/6, Re 6/6, Re 450, Re 460). Fourteen RABe 511 trainsets are named, mostly after Swiss communes or cantons with the name and respective coat of arms (COA) indicated at both ends of the trainset. The table below lists all named RABe 511 with their respective number (№). Trainsets of Zurich S-Bahn are indicated with an *:

Named SBB RABe 511 units
№	COA	Name	№	COA	Name	№	COA	Name
511 001*		Berlin	511 016		Kanton Luzern	511 033*		Winterthur
511 002*		Stadt Zürich	511 017		Kanton Schaffhausen	511 048*		Rapperswil-Jona
511 010*		Urdorf	511 022		Kanton St. Gallen	511 059	—	Pünten (Note: Pünte is the local name for an allotment garden in the city of Winterthur, Switzerland.)
511 011*		Dietikon	511 023		Kanton Graubünden	511 067		Zell ZH
511 014*		Wettingen	511 031		Bezirk Affoltern			

== Features ==
The KISS family was created as the third generation of vehicles for the Zürich S-Bahn. Compared to previous generations, they are characterized mainly by a higher number of standing passengers per car, in part because the longer trains have proportionately fewer seats. The trains are 15 cm (5.9 in) wider due to placing the HVAC channels under the ceiling instead of behind side panels. The headroom is still two meters, because friction stir welded floor panels made from aluminium extrusions are used. The number of seats, however, is slightly lower than in the previous models. Like in the KISS's predecessors, low-floor entrances, vehicle air conditioning and vacuum toilets (two, including one wheelchair accessible) are available. There are also two multi-functional areas with storage space for strollers, bicycles and the like.

The six-car train set consists of two head power cars and four intermediate trailers. In the power heads, all axles are powered. The "Eurasia" version for the Russian gauge railways, in a six and four-car formation, has two trailer heads and two shorter intermediate power cars, and also two intermediate trailers in a six car formation. A special diesel-electric version of the "Eurasia" train, which first appeared in 2021, is manufactured in an eight-car formation, including 2 double-deck head cars, 2 diesel generator cars, 3 intermediate double-deck cars and 1 single-deck car.

Iberian gauge KISS vehicles (labelled Class 453 "T100" and "T200" based on their length) ordered by Renfe in Spain are currently being tested, which will feature a combination of single-deck FLIRT end cars joined by either two double-decker KISS intermediate cars or with two extra single-deck FLIRT intermediate cars. Despite an original 2025 production timeline, the trains finally entered service in August 2026.

== Customers ==
Year of order	Year of service	Customer	Country	No. of trainsets	No. of cars	Notes
2008	2012	Swiss Federal Railways	Switzerland	50		For use on the Zürich S-Bahn
2010	2012	BLS AG	Switzerland	28	4	BLS RABe 515; for use on the Bern S-Bahn
2010	2012	Ostdeutsche Eisenbahn	Germany	16	4	For regional lines in Berlin/ Brandenburg/Mecklenburg-Vorpommern
2010	2011	Westbahn (later Deutsche Bahn)	Austria	7	6	For service between Vienna and Salzburg. To be transferred to DB Fernverkehr
2010	2012	Swiss Federal Railways	Switzerland	24		For use on regional express lines
2010	2014	CFL	Luxembourg	19	3	For service between Luxembourg and Koblenz, Luxembourg and Trier and Luxembourg and Düsseldorf
2013	2015	Westfalenbahn	Germany	13	6	For regional lines in North Rhine-Westphalia and Lower Saxony
2013	2016	Aeroexpress	Russia	11	4 or 6	For the Moscow airport shuttle service as ESh2 "Eurasia"
2015		Azerbaijan Railways	Azerbaijan	5	4	Labelled as EŞ2 "Eurasia"
2015	2017	BLS AG	Switzerland	3	4	BLS RABe 515; for use on the Bern S-Bahn
2015	2016	Swiss Federal Railways	Switzerland	19		For use on the Zürich S-Bahn
2015	2017	Westbahn (later Deutsche Bahn)	Austria	9; 1	4; 6	For service between Vienna and Salzburg Sold to Deutsche Bahn in 2020 for use as IC2 intercity trains on the Dresden–Berlin–Rostock line.
2016		Georgian Railways	Georgia	4	4	Labelled as GRS "Eurasia"
2016	2019	Mälardalstrafik (leased from Transitio)	Sweden	33	4	For use in the Mälaren Valley. Max speed 200 km/h. Designated as ER1.
2016	11 August 2024	Caltrain	United States	23 1	7; 4	Part of the Caltrain Modernization Program. As of August 2023, 161 cars (23 7-car sets), plus one 4 car bi-level BEMU for use between Tamien and Gilroy, with 55 options remaining.
2017	2019	Kollektivtrafikförvaltningen UL (later Mälardalstrafik; leased from Transitio)	Sweden	8	4	For the "Upptåget" service between Uppsala-Gävle.
2017	15 March 2020	MÁV-Start	Hungary	40 (19+21)	6	The first vehicle may enter service in the second quarter of 2020, the last of which will begin in early 2021
2018	2020	BLS AG	Switzerland	8	4–6	BLS RABe 515; for use on long-distance routes
2018	2022	Slovenske železnice	Slovenia	10	3	SŽ class 313/318
2019	2021	Westbahn	Austria	15	6	For service between Vienna and Salzburg. Replace for trainsets sold to DB
2021	2021	Azerbaijan Railways	Azerbaijan	1	8	Special DMU for railway administration officials. Labelled as DŞ2 "Eurasia"
2021	19 March 2022	Srbija Voz	Serbia	3	4	ŽS 410. For 200 km/h service between Belgrade, Novi Sad and Subotica on high-speed "Soko" intercity services.
2021	15 February 2024	Železničná spoločnosť Slovensko	Slovakia	4	6	For service on lines Bratislava–Trenčín and Bratislava–Nové Zámky. 4th unit delivery delayed till November 2024 due to an accident on Velim test centre.
2021	17 July 2023	Swiss Federal Railways	Switzerland	60	6	In ordering them, Swiss Federal Railways exercised options from previous orders. They were first rolled out on the Zurich-Schaffhausen route, and are planned to be spread to other routes in Switzerland, generally centring on Zurich or Lausanne, gradually between 2024 and 2027.
2021	24 August 2026	Renfe (Cercanías division)	Spain	79		24 100m trains and 55 200m trains (Renfe Class 453), for Cercanías Madrid.
2019	2022	Deutsche Bahn	Germany	18		Trainsets purchased for DB Regio
2021	2023	Tåg i Bergslagen (leased from Transitio)	Sweden	14	4	For service between Ludvika and Västerås and other routes in the Bergslagen region.
2022 2023	2026	ÖBB	Austria	20+42 13	4/6 6	ÖBB 4705/4706/4734/4736; 20 four-car sets + 42 six-car sets: 160 km/h for Vienna ÖBB Regional and City Airport Train; 13 six-car Railjet: 200 km/h
2024	2026 (planned)	BDŽ	Bulgaria	7+3		160 km/h

== See also ==
- List of stock used by Swiss Federal Railways
- Bombardier Omneo
- SBB-CFF-FFS RABe 514 (Siemens Desiro)
- SJ X40 (Alstom Coradia)
- ČD Class 471 (CityElefant)
- UZ Class 675 (Škoda EJ 675)
