= Mutz =

Mutz may refer to:

== Nickname ==
- Mutz Ens (1884–1950), American baseball player
- Mutz Greenbaum (1896–1968), German-born cinematographer
- Moshe Matalon (politician) (born 1953), Israeli politician

== Surname ==
- Bill Mutz, mayor of Lakeland, Florida (2018–2021)
- Diana Mutz (born 1962), American political scientist
- John Mutz (born 1935), American politician

== Other ==
- BLS RABe 515, a Swiss train class
