= Eurasia (train) =

Russian version of the Stadler KISS train

Eurasia ESh2, EŞ2, GRS
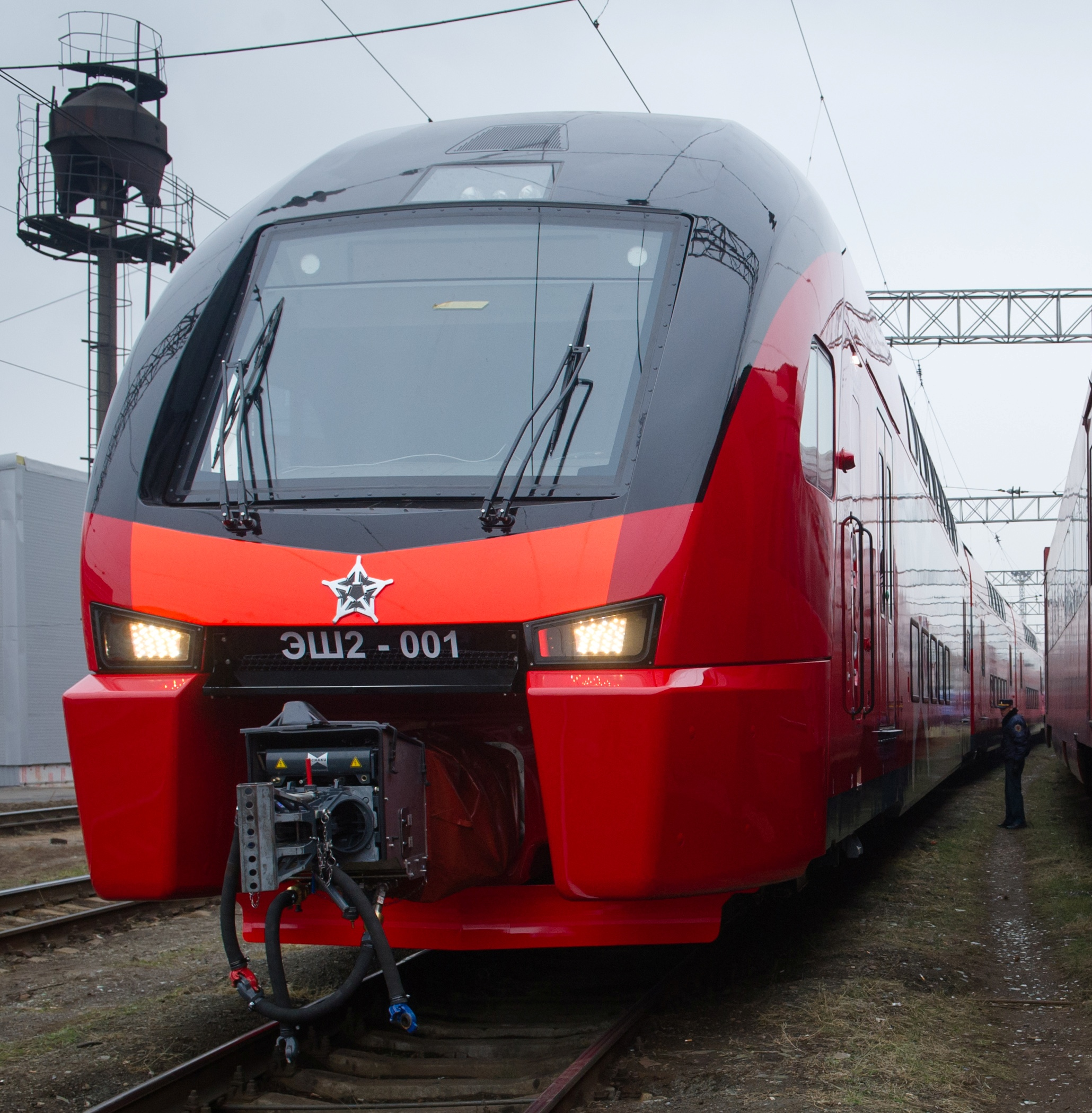
- First Eurasia train (ESh2-001) in Moscow.
- In service: 2015–present
- Manufacturer: Stadler
- Family name: Stadler KISS
- Formation: 6 or 4 cars
- Capacity: 700
- Operators: Aeroexpress; Azerbaijan Railways; Georgian Railways
- Lines served: Azerbaijan Railways; Georgian Railways; Moscow Railway

Specifications
- Train length: 250 m (820 ft 2 1/2 in); Which variant?
- Width: 3.265 m (10 ft 8 1/2 in)
- Height: 5.24 m (17 ft 2 1/4 in)
- Floor height: 1.36 m (53 1/2 in)
- Maximum speed: 160 km/h (99 mph), upgraded to 200 km/h (124 mph)
- Weight: 349 t (343 long tons; 385 short tons)
- Power output: 6,000 kW (8,000 hp)
- Tractive effort: 328 kN (74,000 lb_{f}) (starting); 296 kN (67,000 lb_{f}) at 97 km/h (60 mph) (continuous)
- Power supply: What voltage?
- Electric system: 3 kV DC overhead line
- Current collection: Pantograph
- UIC classification: 2′2′+Bo′Bo′+2′2′+Bo′Bo′+2′2′+2′2′ (6-car version); 2′2′+Bo′Bo′+Bo′2′+2′2′ (4-car version)
- Safety system: KLUB-U
- Track gauge: 1,520 mm (4 ft 11 27/32 in) Russian gauge

The ESh2 Eurasia (Russian: ЭШ2 «Евразия», also Yevraziya) is the Russian gauge version of the Stadler KISS double-deck electric train. These trains are used by three operators— Aeroexpress, Azerbaijan Railways and Georgian Railways.

== History ==
In 2014, due to the growth of passenger traffic on the routes connecting urban stations to airports, Aeroexpress has signed a contract with Stadler AG: a contract for production of 25 double-deck Stadler KISS family—16 4-car set and 9 6-car version. The cost of all 118 cars is 385.31 million euros. According to the production plan, the first three trains will be fully assembled in Altenrhein's research and development center of Stadler. Assembly of the remaining 22 trains will be carried out in Stadler's new plant in Minsk.

For the first time, in early February 2014, the body of the motor car trains for the future was presented at the plant in Altenrhein. In August 2014, the plant produced the first six-car train ESh2-001, which was soon sent on the ferry to Klaipėda. In October 2014, the train arrived in Minsk for acceptance, commissioning tests. In November, its presentation took place in Moscow's Ilyich Train Depot; soon the second train arrived. Both trains were painted red with black bands at the level of the windows. Later, due to lack of funds caused by the decline of the ruble against the euro, Aeroexpress has further delayed the purchase of new electric trains. As a result of this funding crisis, the delivery of the first two trains manufactured in Belarus has never been carried out, and the third train was taken on the ferry to Lithuania and finally sent to Fanipol in April 2015.

On 13 May 2015 Azerbaijan Railways ordered 5 trains of this type.

== Tests ==
During the testing of the trains, they made a number of test runs without passengers on routes Shcherbinka–Moscow, Shcherbinka–Kubinka and Moscow–Vladimir.

In the period 2015–16, the gradual introduction of the trains in regular operation is planned on the Moscow Railway as Aeroexpress trains from Belorussky, Kievsky and Paveletsky railway stations to airports Sheremetyevo, Vnukovo and Domodedovo.

== Variants ==
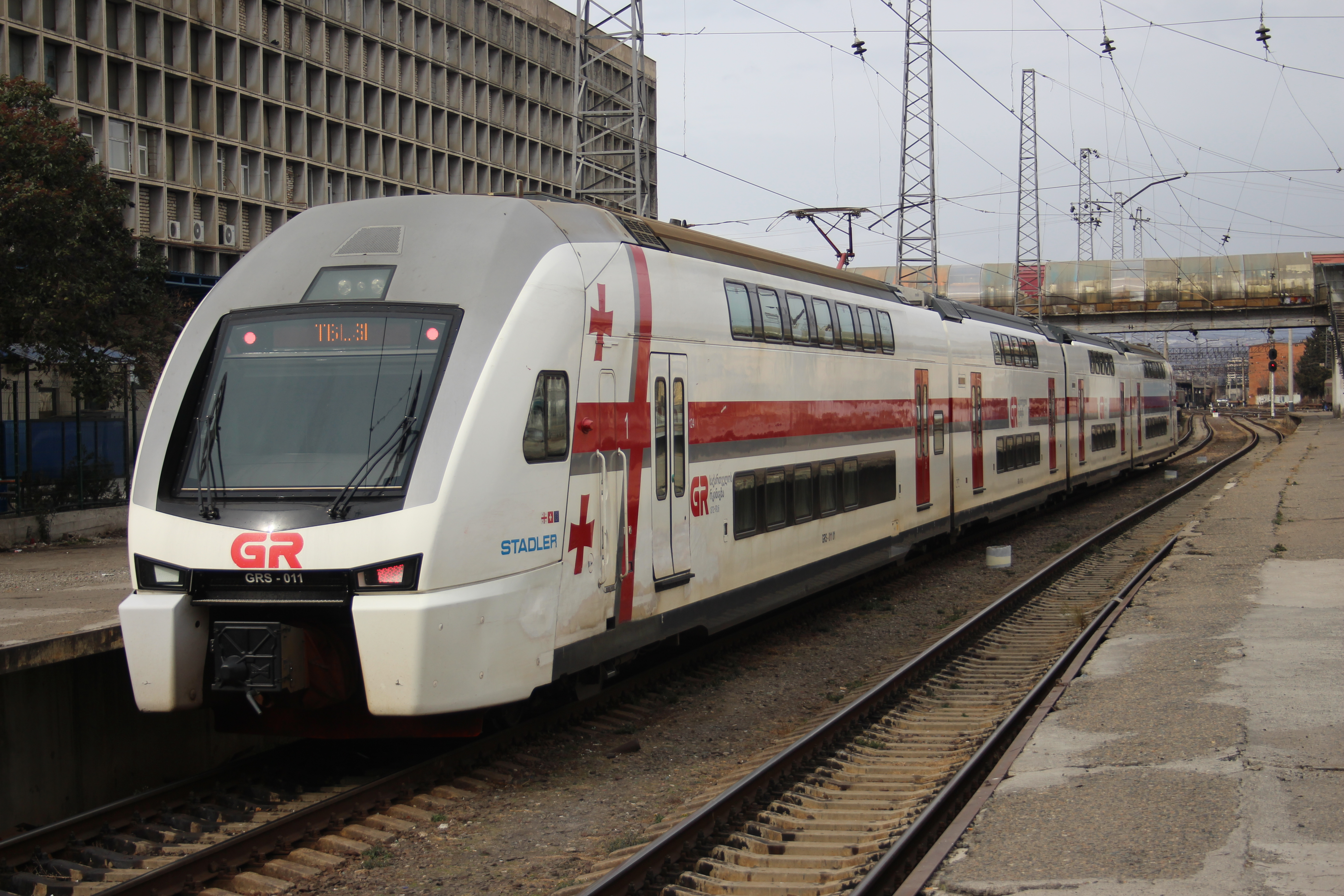
Georgian Railways GRS class at Tbilisi main station

The variants of Russian bilevel EMUs are:

- DC sets with high doors (existing);
- AC sets with high doors;
- AC/DC sets with low doors;
- AC/DC sets with high and low doors.

The high doors are accessible with the 1,100 mm (43.3 in) platforms, while the low doors are accessible with the 200 mm (7.9 in) platforms and the 550 mm (21.7 in) platforms.

== Photos of interior ==
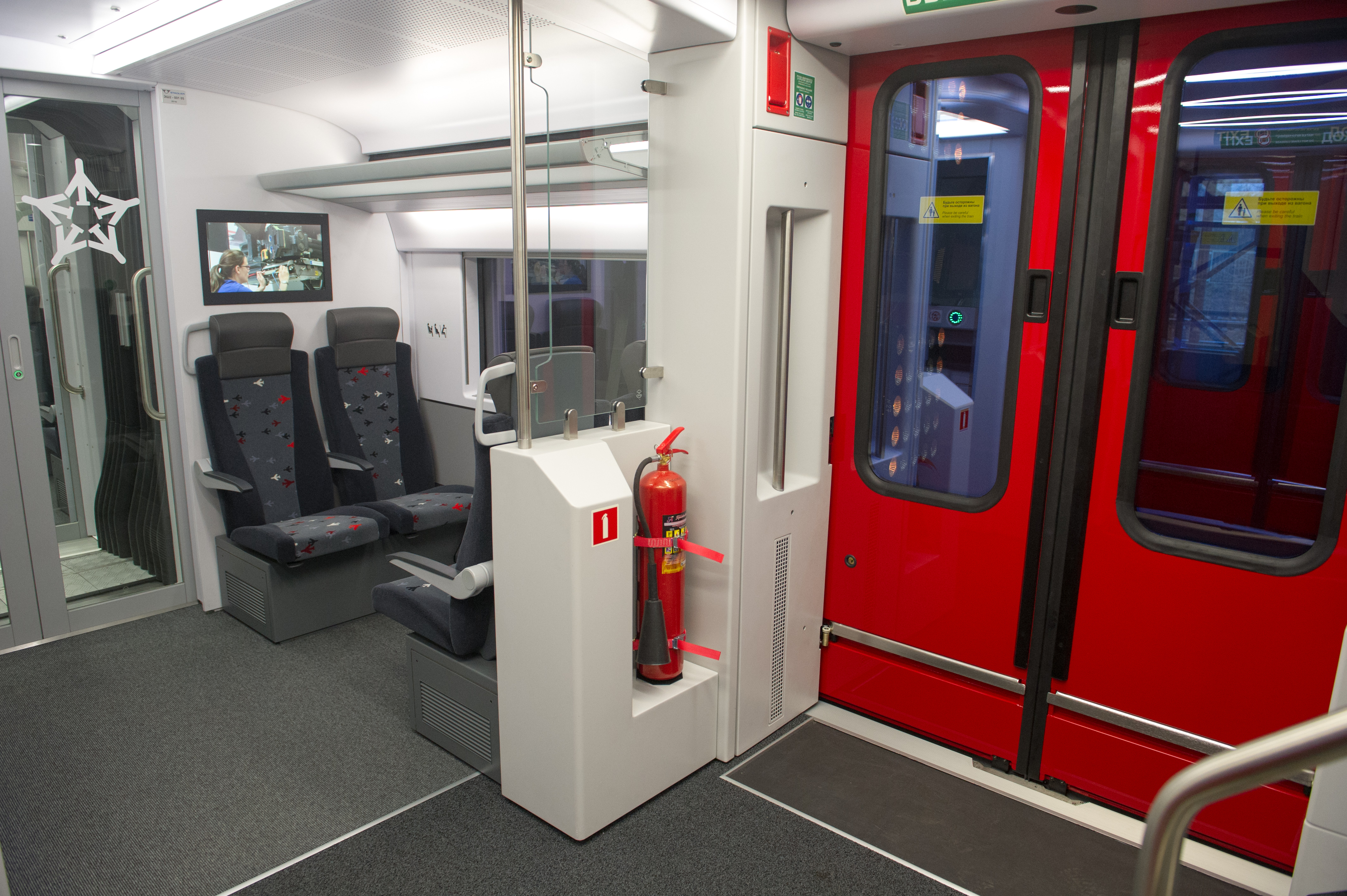
Entrance

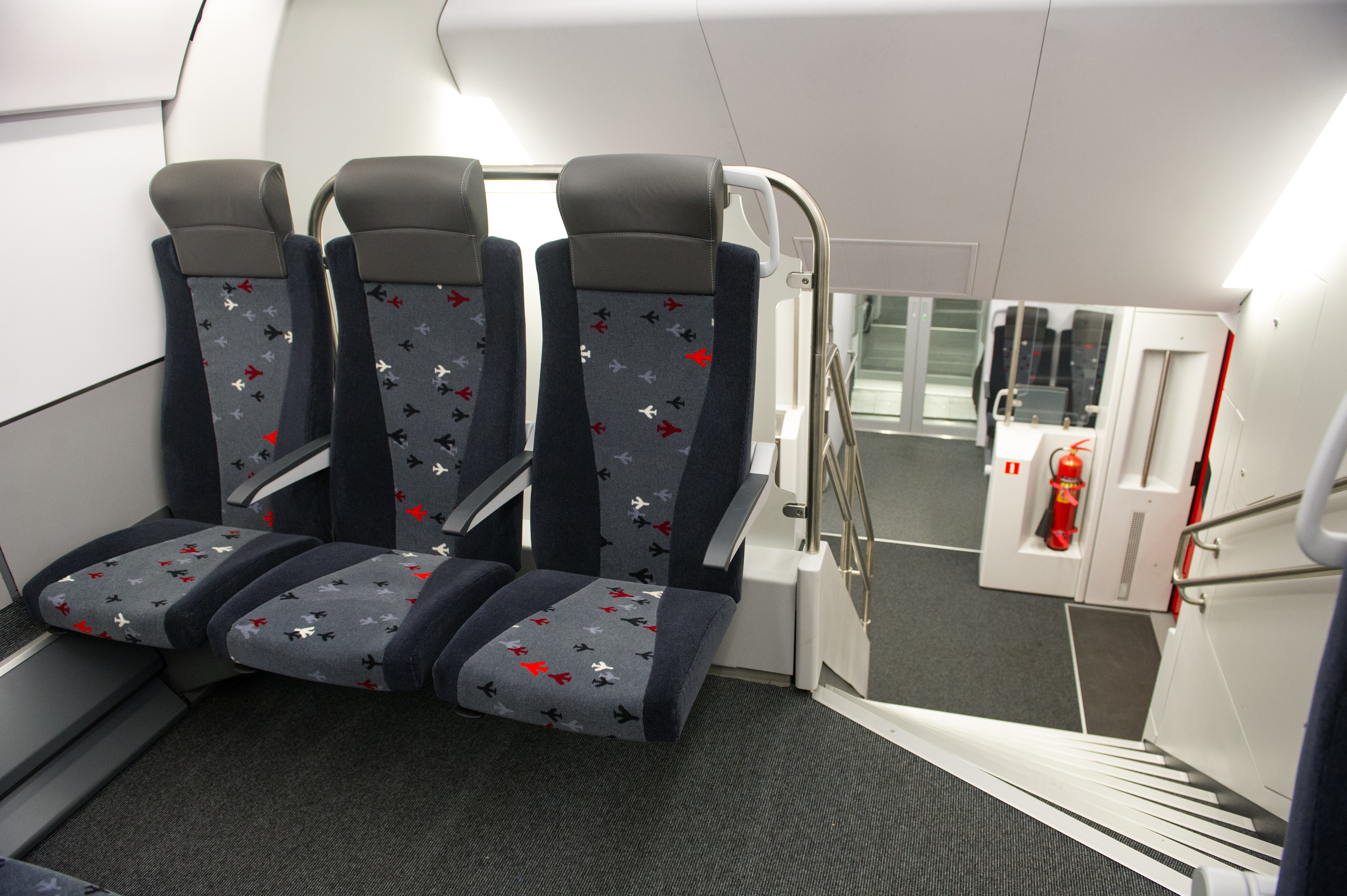
Stairs from the upper deck

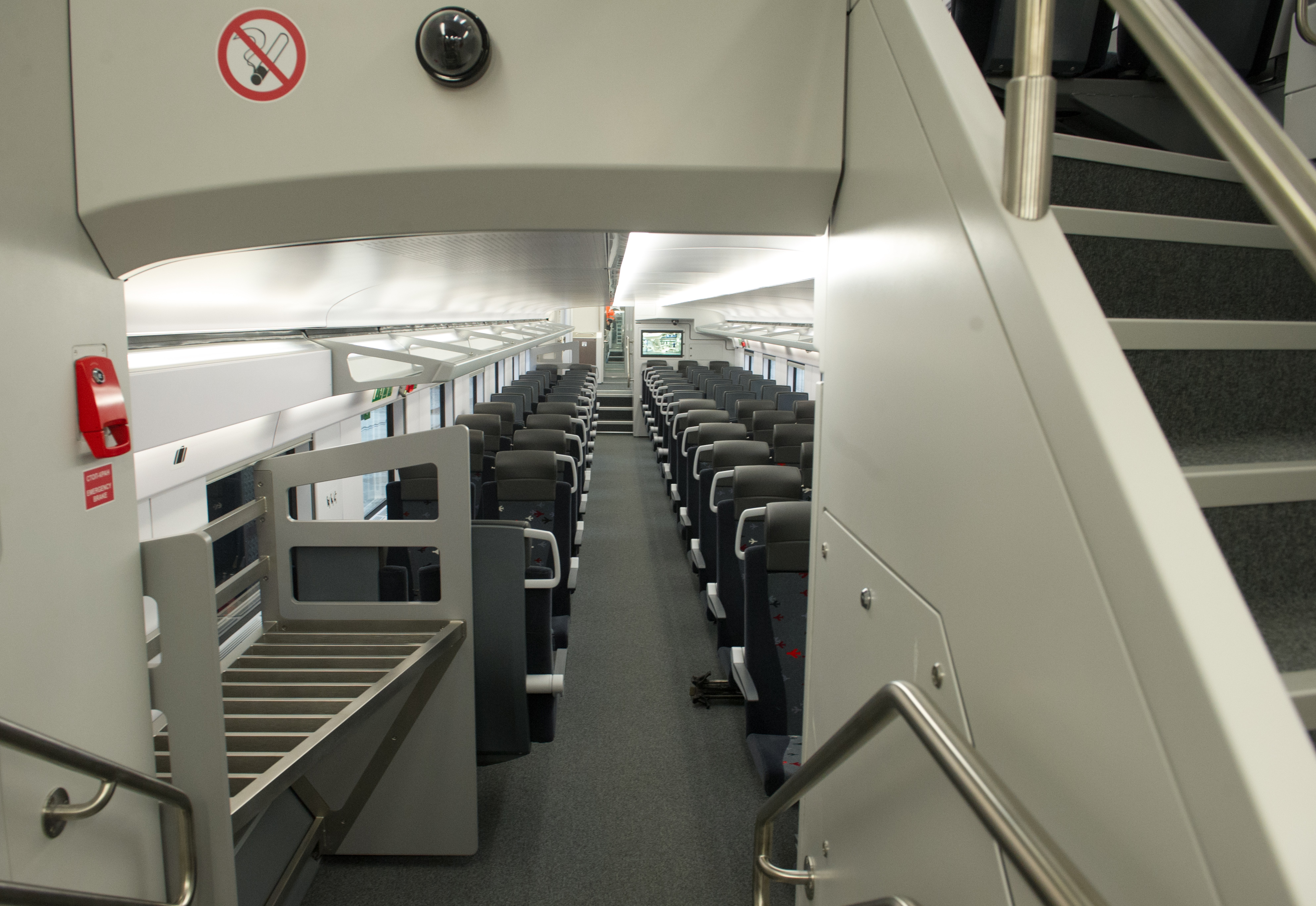
Stairs to the lower deck

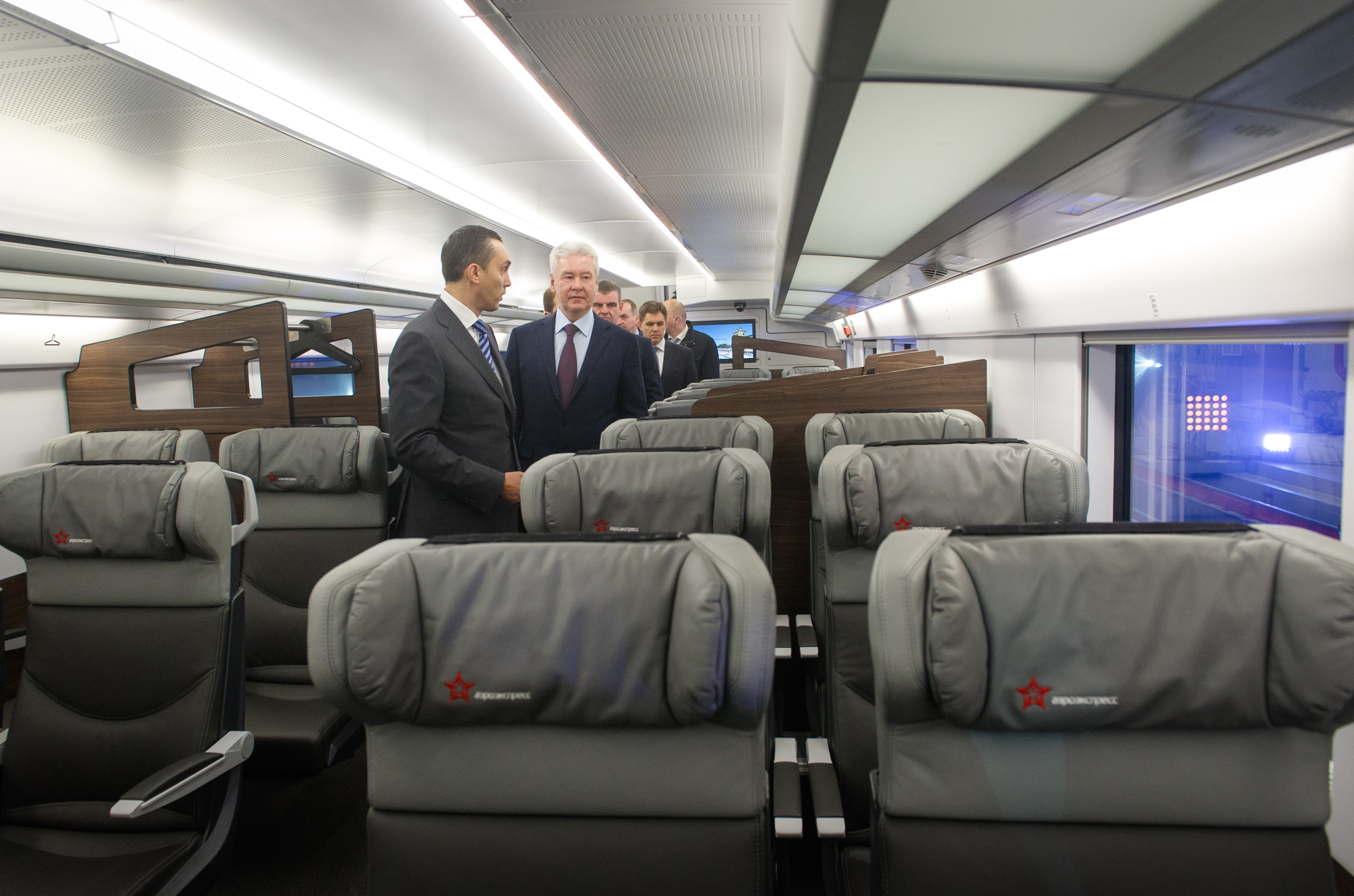
1st class car

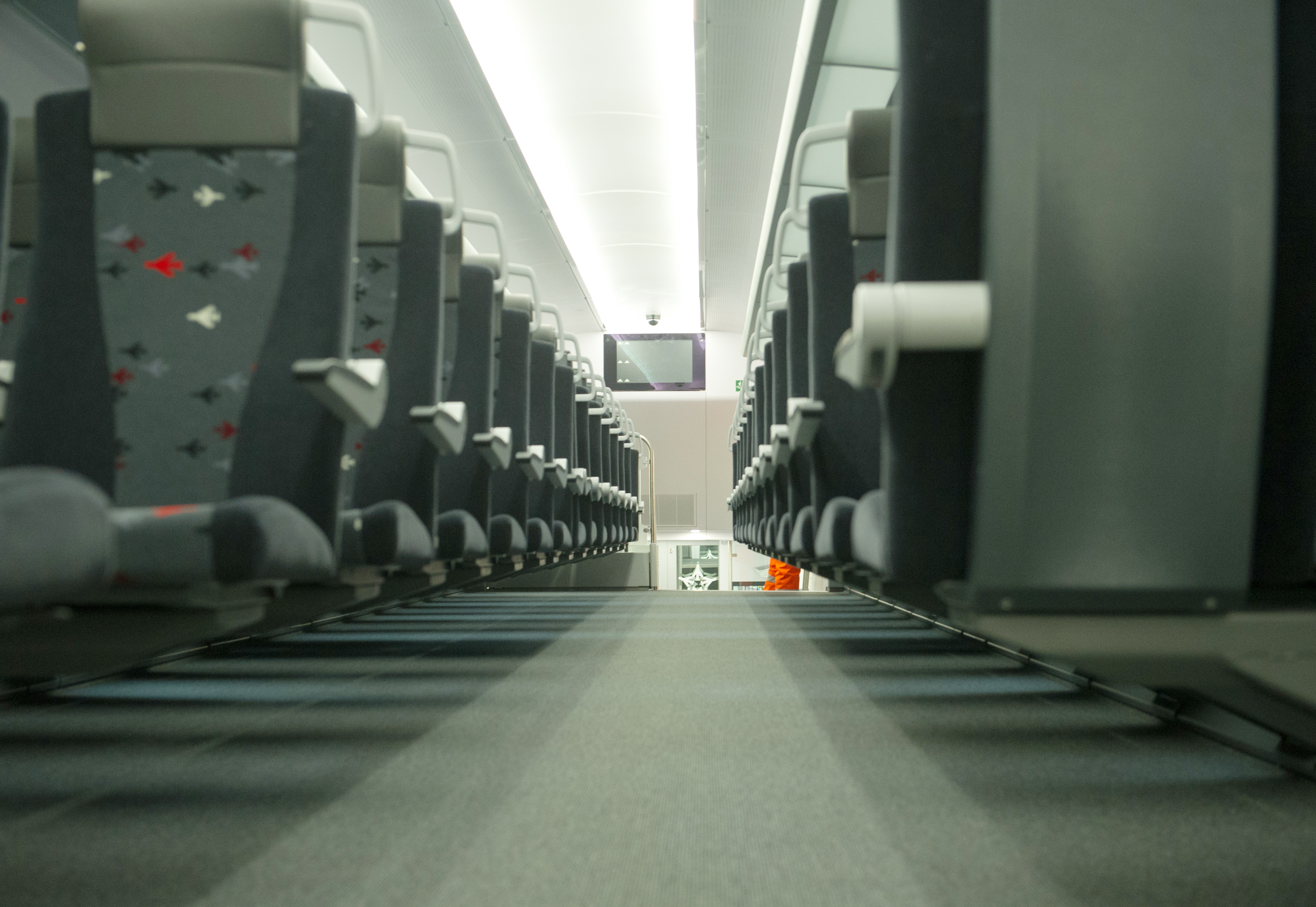
2nd class car

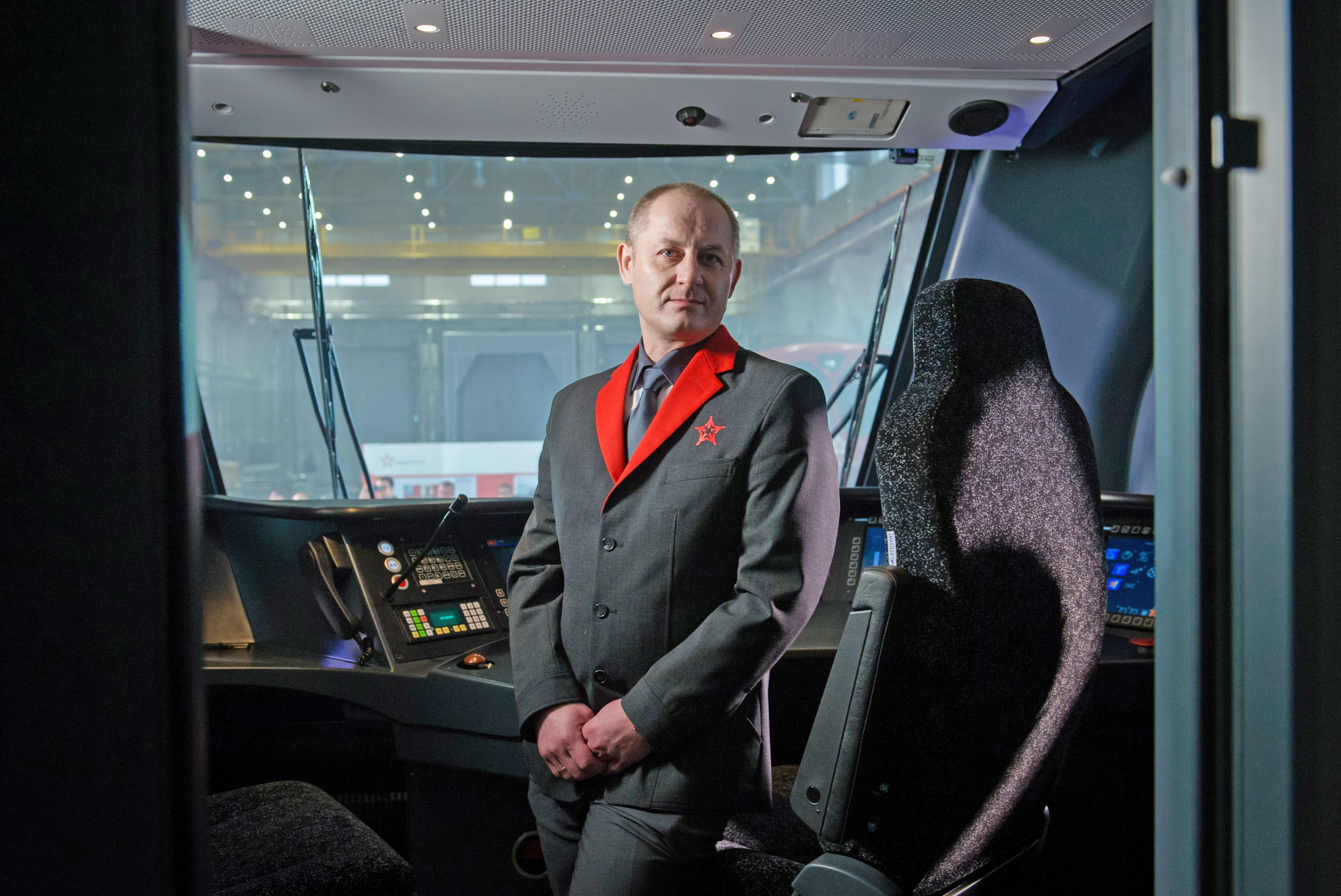
Cabin

== Videos ==
Testing of ESh2-001 train on railway circuit in Shcherbinka

Presentation of ESh2-002 in Shcherbinka

== Links ==
- Photos on Trainpix.org
- Photos on Parovoz.com
- Evrazia on Aeroexpress website
