= ČD Class 471 =

Double deck electric multiple unit

ČD Class 471 CityElefant
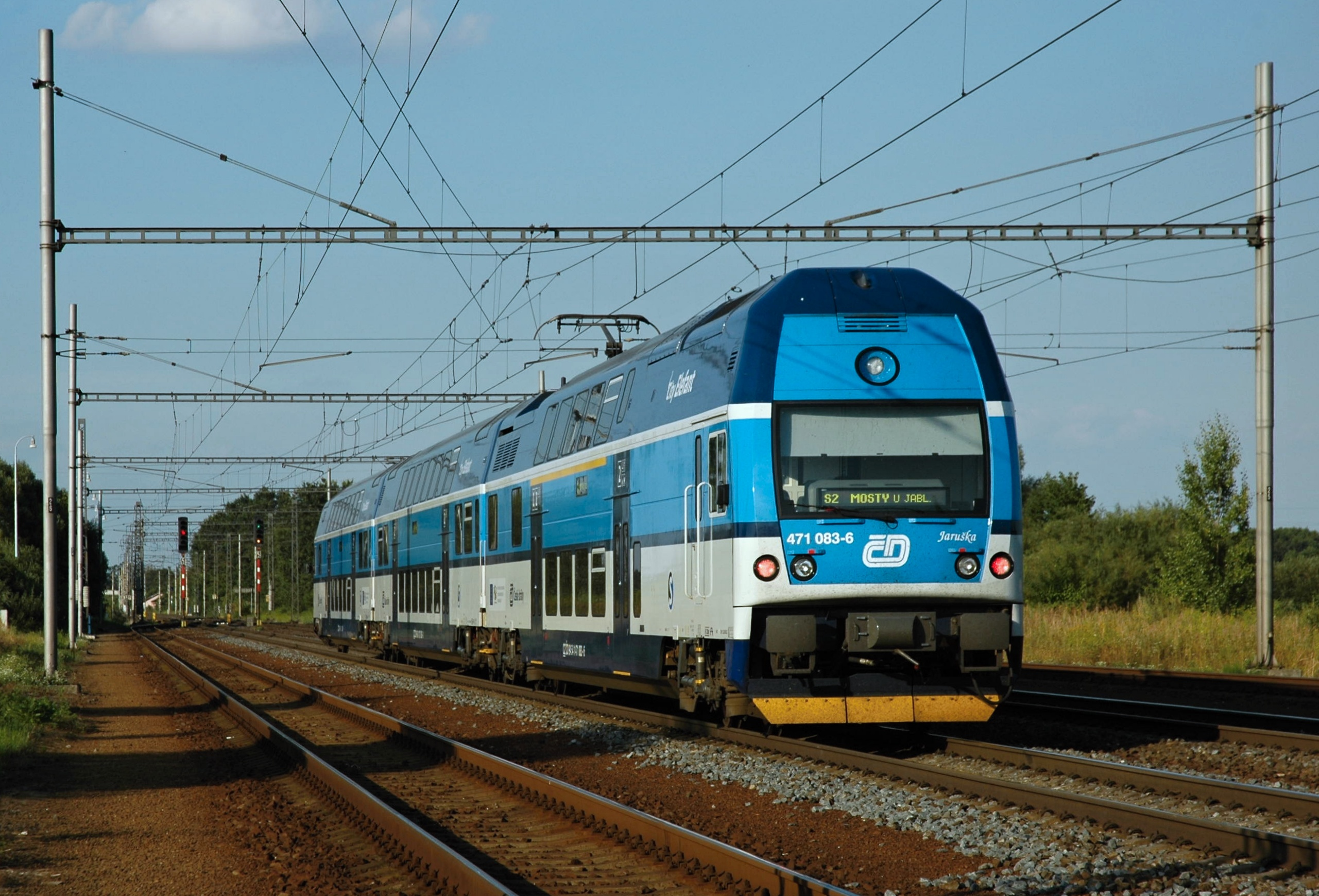
- In service: 2000 — present
- Manufacturer: Škoda Transportation
- Constructed: 1997–2013
- Number built: 83 units
- Number in service: 83 units
- Capacity: 287 2nd class, 23 1st class
- Operator: České dráhy

Specifications
- Maximum speed: 140 km/h (87 mph)
- Weight: 155.4 tonnes (343,000 lb)
- Power output: 2,000 kW (2,682 hp)
- UIC classification: Bo’Bo’+ 2’2’+ 2’2’
- Track gauge: 1,435 mm (4 ft 8 1/2 in) standard gauge

The Class 471 electric motor unit, commonly known as CityElefant, is a double deck electric multiple unit operating on 3 kV DC overhead wires produced by Škoda Vagonka, a subsidiary of Škoda Transportation, since 1997 and operated by the České dráhy rail transit operator on its suburban services around Prague and Ostrava, Czech Republic. A single unit consists of a Class 471 power car with first class seating, a single Class 071 passenger car and a Class 971 cab car. They are replacement for defunct ČD Class 451, and successor to scrapped ČD Class 470.

Czech railways ordered in total 83 units. The last unit for the Czech Railways was delivered in March 2013. In addition, variants differing in power system and other parameters, have been ordered by Lithuanian Railways, Železničná spoločnosť Slovensko and Ukrainian Railways.

== Derived units ==
=== Czech Railways ===
In 2019, ČD concluded a contract push-pull sets similar to those for Deutsche Bahn. The trainsets will be used from Ostrava to Frenštát pod Radhoštěm, in operation with ČD Class 750.7. In March 2021, they were tested in Cerhenice with ČD Class 242 and ČD Class 750.7. They were originally launched in 2020, but will not be operated until 2021.

=== Lithuanian Railways ===
The Lithuanian Railways ordered 13 broad gauge units of class EJ 575. The first train was delivered in 2008 and the last unit was delivered in 2017. They are operated on the route Vilnius – Kaunas since December 2008 , Vilnius – Trakai and Vilnius – Minsk (Belarus). Units consist of two and three cars. They have very similar interior like Czech class 471. The maximum speed has increased up to 160 km/h (99 mph).

=== ZSSK ===
The ZSSK operates 19 units of class 671 and 10 push-pull units of class 951. All of them are three-car units and the maximum speed has increased to 160 km/h (99 mph).

=== Ukrainian Railways ===
In January 2011, the Ukrainian Railways ordered two broad gauge units of class EJ 675. Both of them are six-car units. The maximum speed has increased to 160 km/h (99 mph). The units were to be the first trains of a series of 50 to 60 units, however no further purchases were made. They currently operate on the route Kyiv – Lutsk and Kyiv - Lviv

=== Deutsche Bahn ===
DB Regio ordered 6 locomotive-hauled push-pull trainsets. Trainsets will be used on Nuremberg–Munich high-speed railway. Push pull units will be hauled by Škoda 109E locomotives. Units are successor of Czech class 471. These new units are designed for speed up to 200 km/h (124 mph). The maximum speed in operation will be limited to 189 km/h (117 mph) as required by Deutsche Bahn in the tender. Trainsets were originally expected to be delivered in 2016, but they are entered in service in the 4th quarter of 2020.

== Accidents ==
- On June 28, 2010 a CityElefant derailed in Ústí nad Labem. 1 driver died and 11 people were injured.
- On September 6, 2019 a commuter train collided with a semi-trailer truck at a level crossing. 8 people were injured.
- In the evening of July 14, 2020 a CityElefant crashed into a stationary postal train near Český Brod train station. The CityElefant driver died and 36 passengers were injured. The investigation revealed that the CityElefant driver had a heart attack shortly before the accident and was not able to avoid a crash.

== Gallery ==
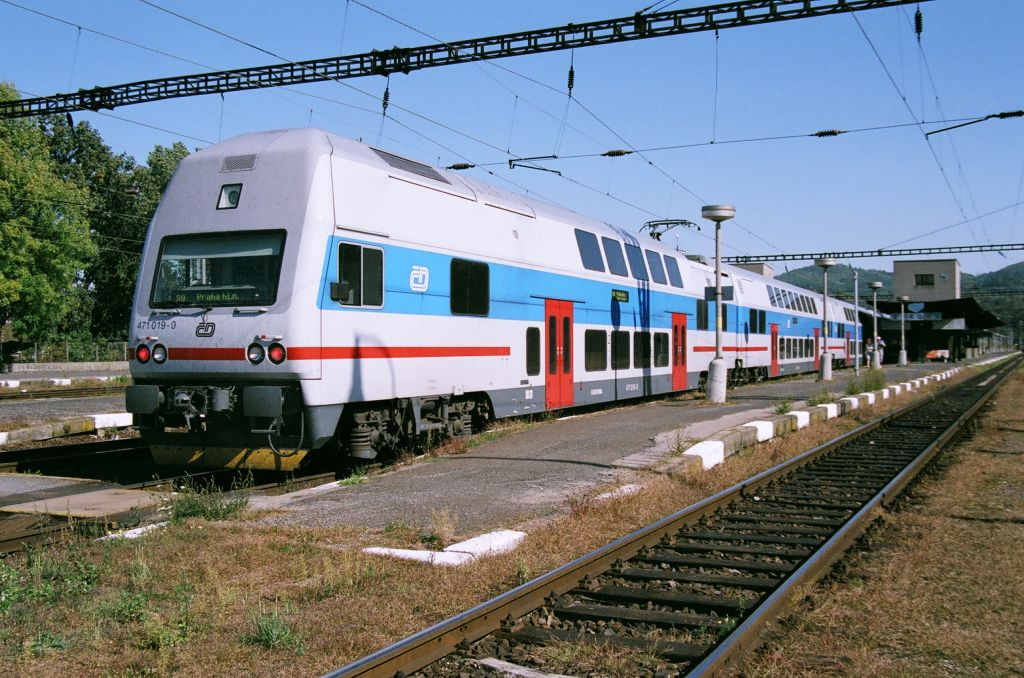
The whole unit in Beroun railway station, October 2006

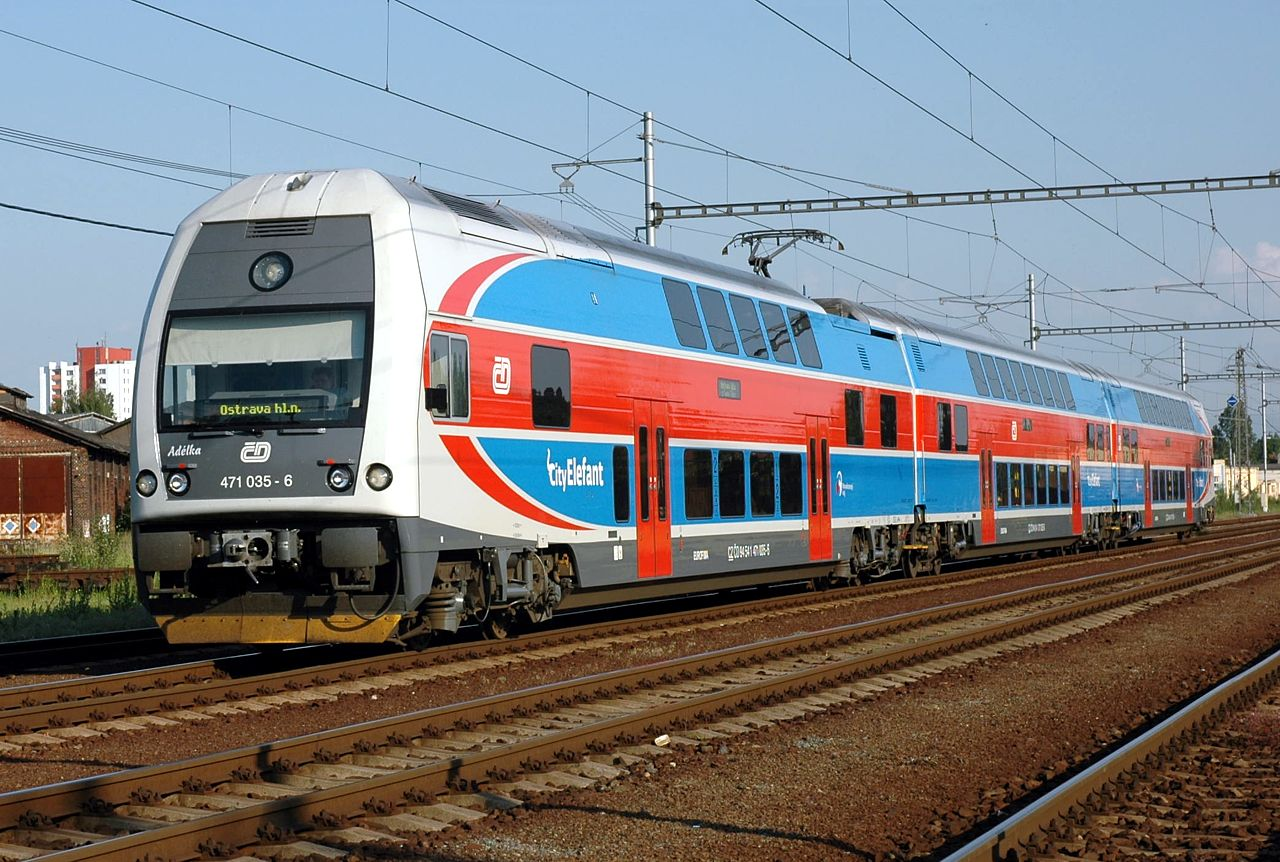
The whole unit about to arrive Ostrava hlavní nádraží, June 2008

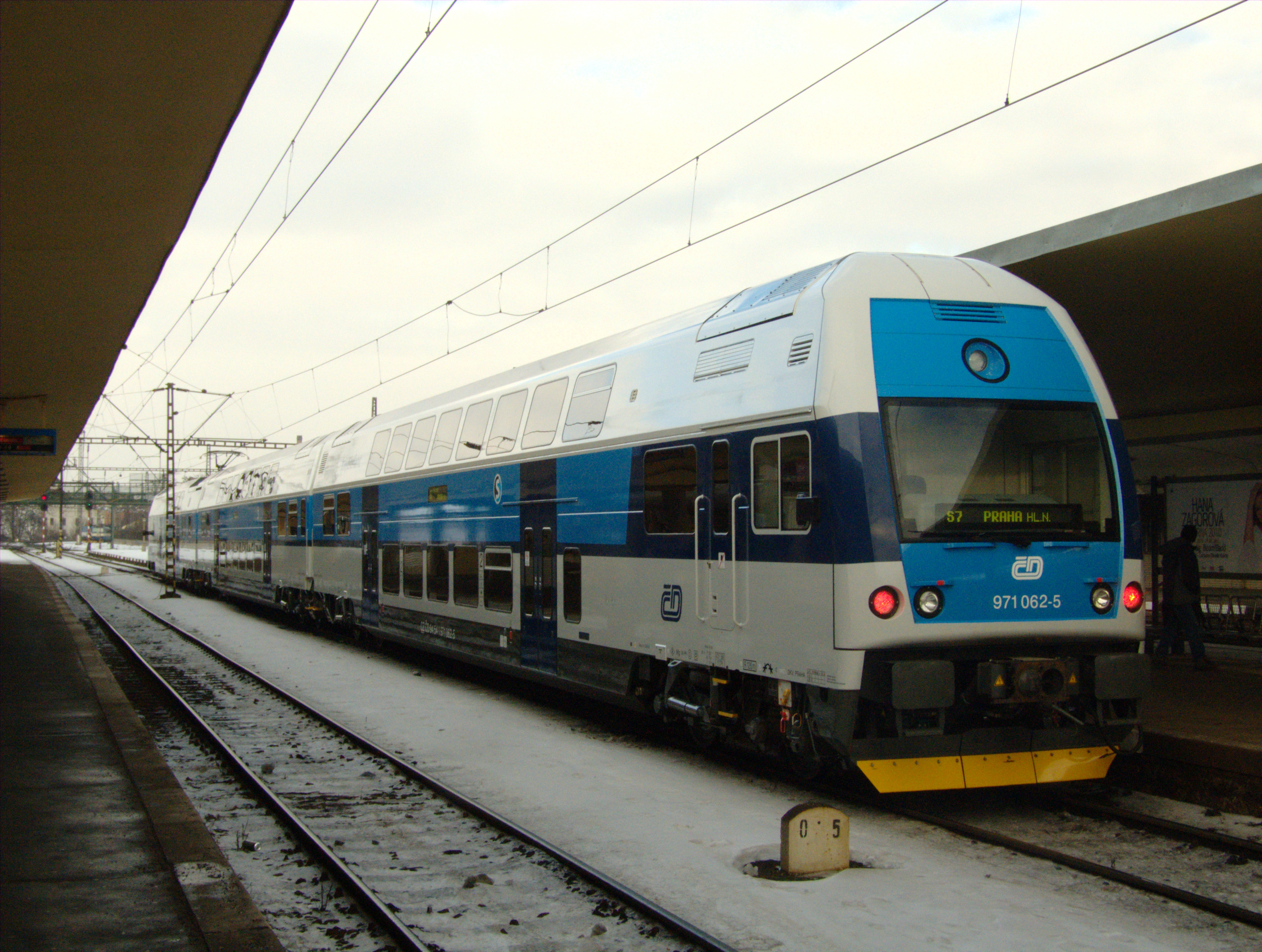
The cab car with new livery

Class 471 EMU in Prague Integrated Transport livery

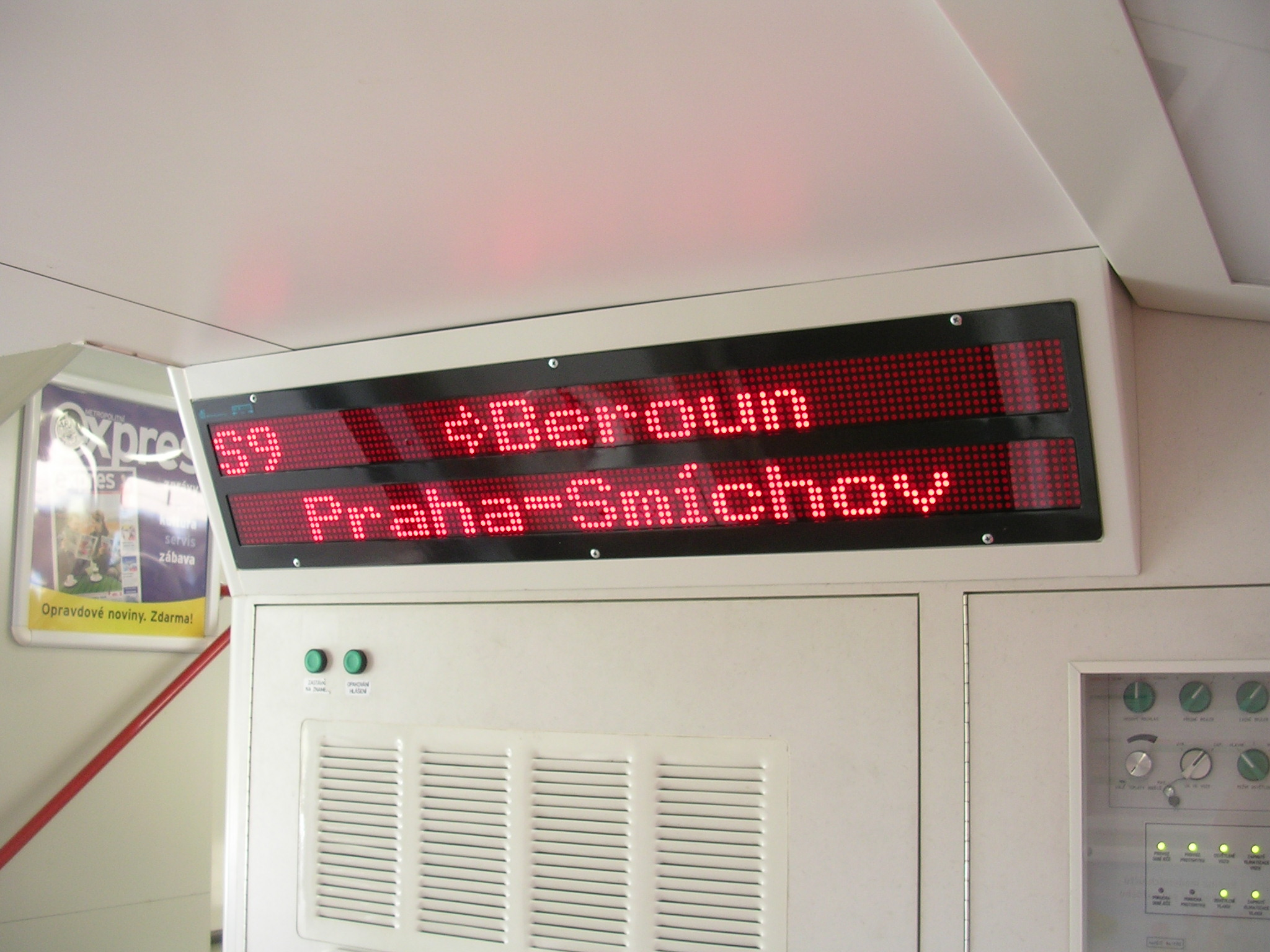
The internal information

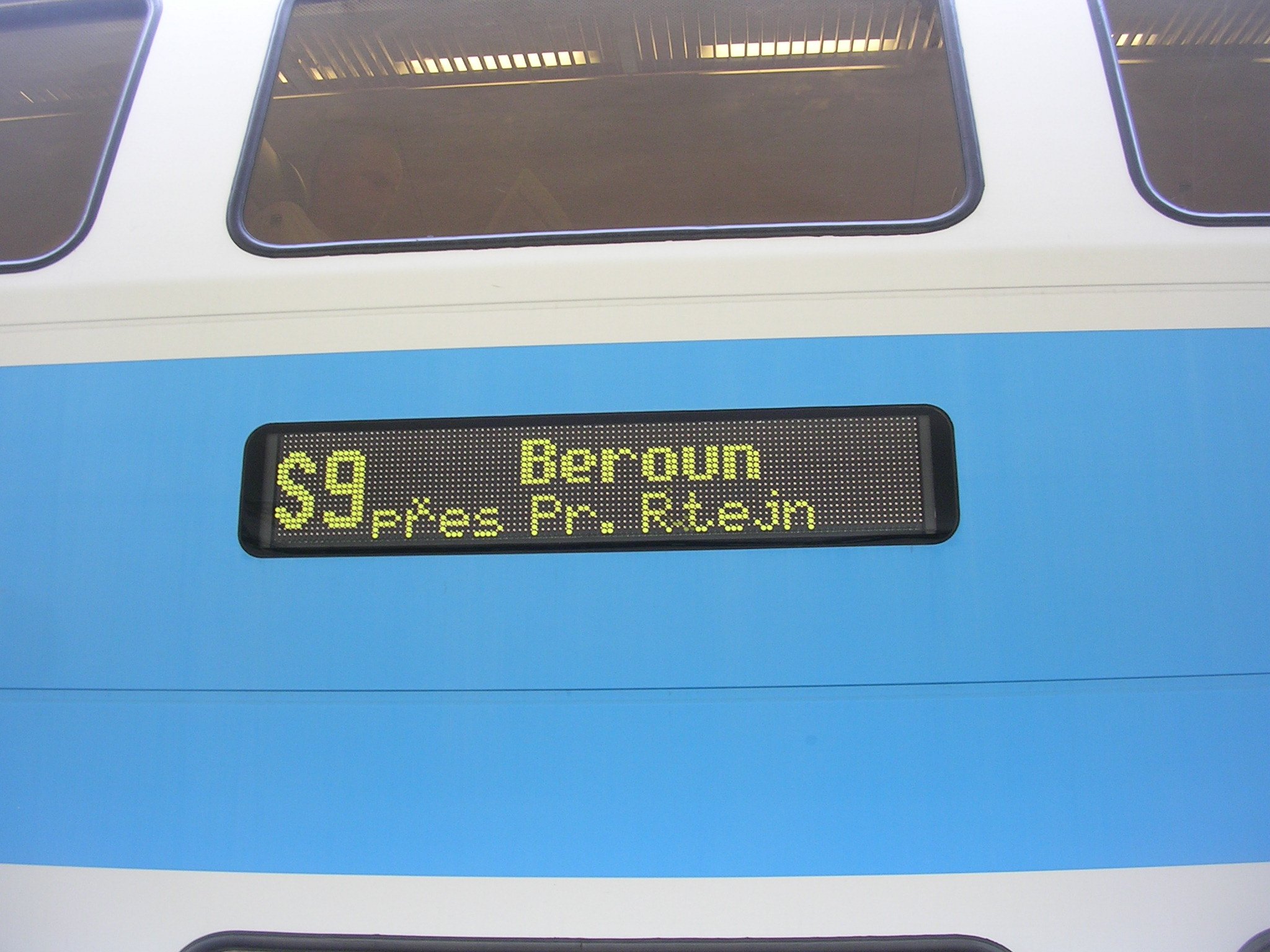
The external information

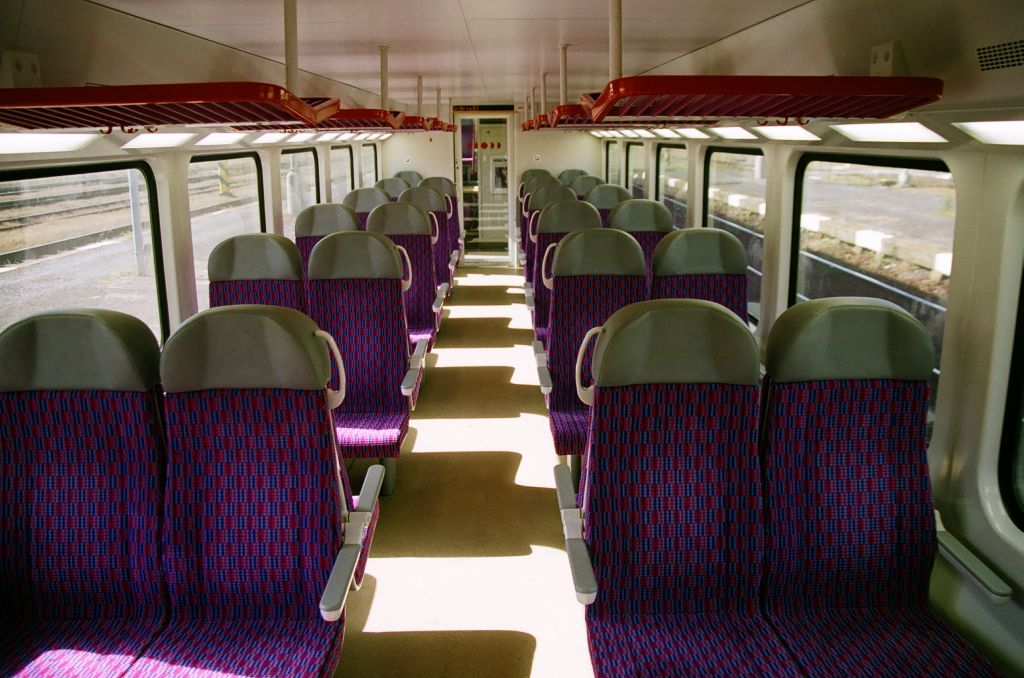
Second class saloon, lower floor

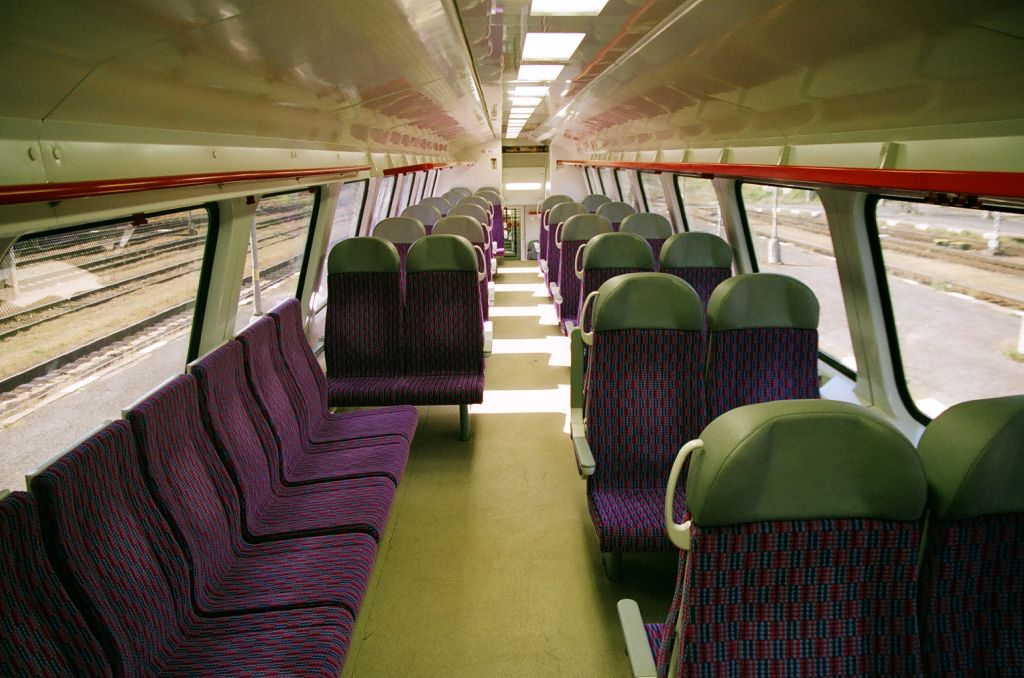
Second class saloon, upper floor

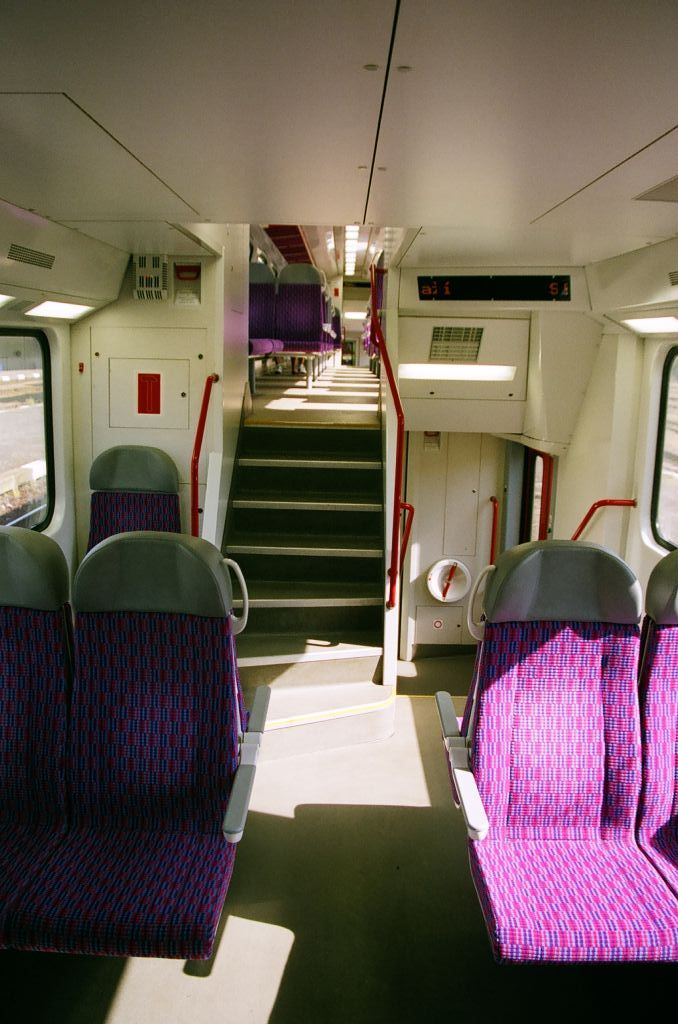
Second class saloon, mezzanine

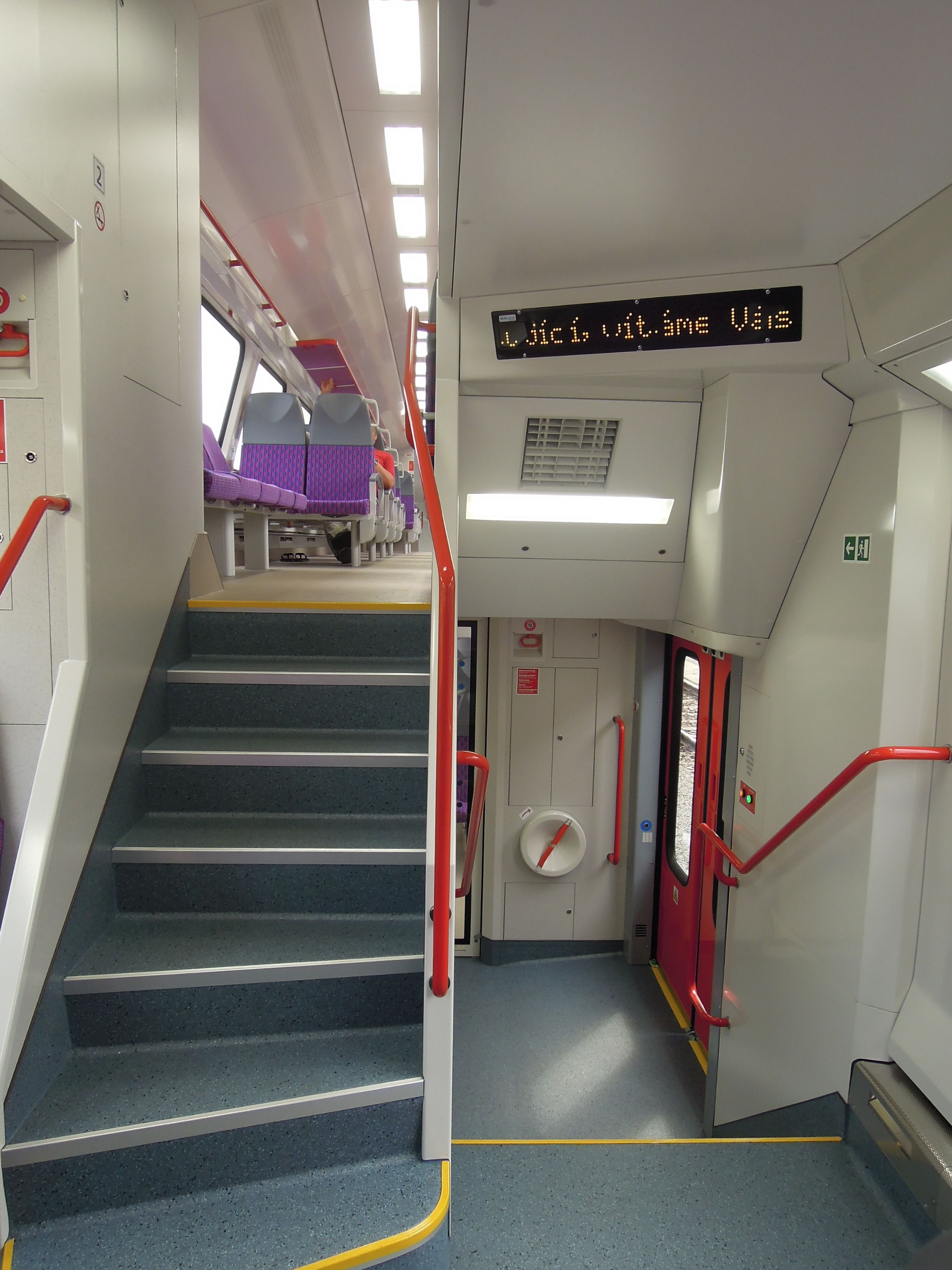
Stairs

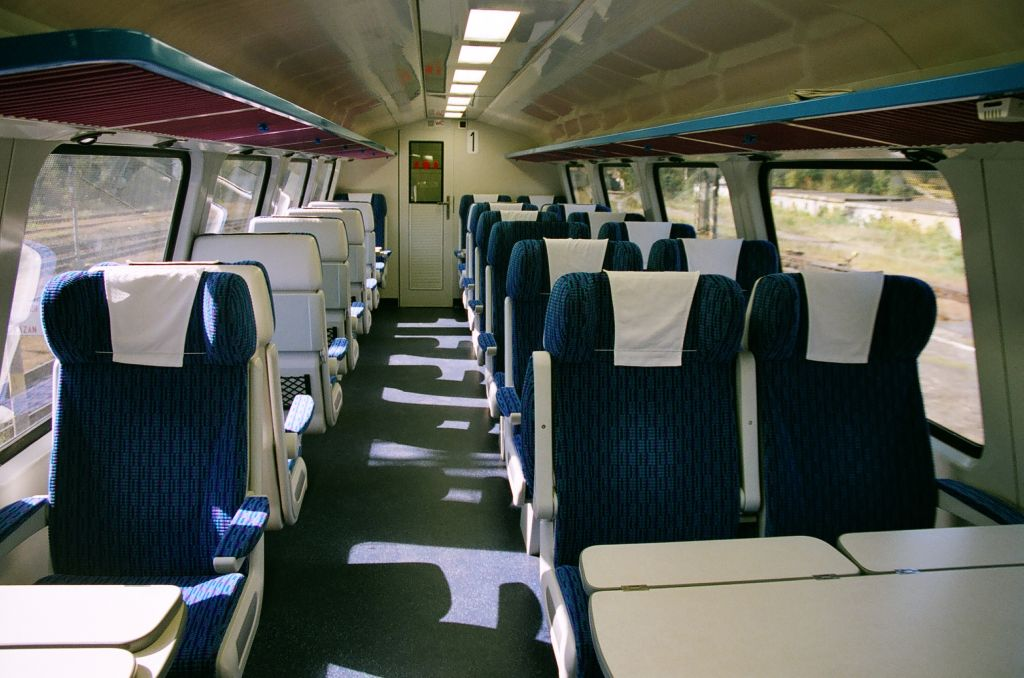
First class saloon, upper floor of the electric car

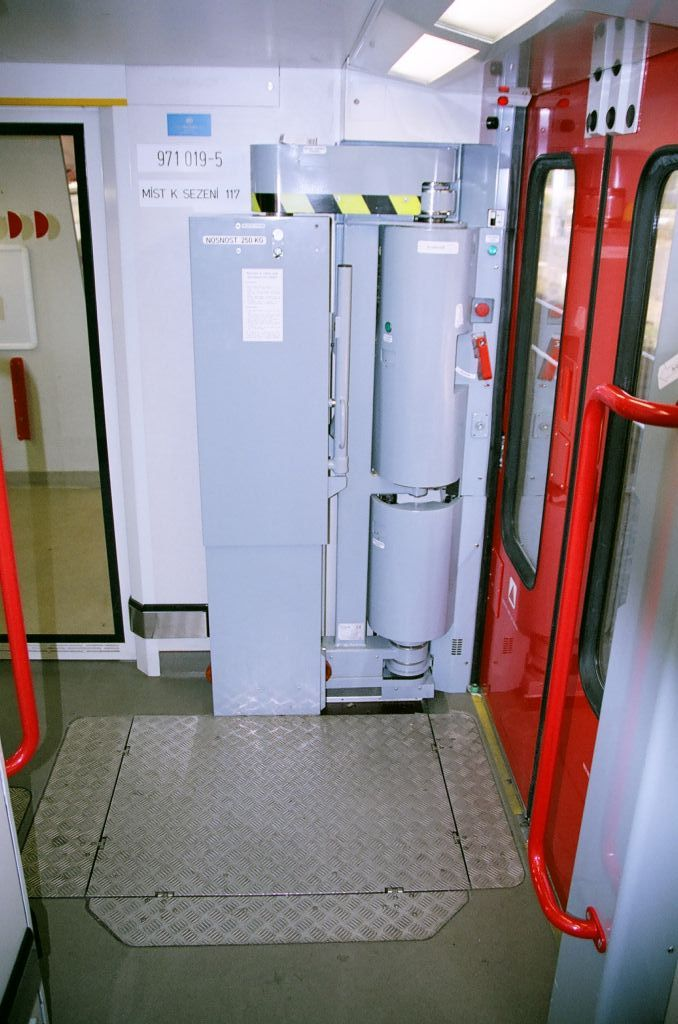
Lifting platform for immobile persons

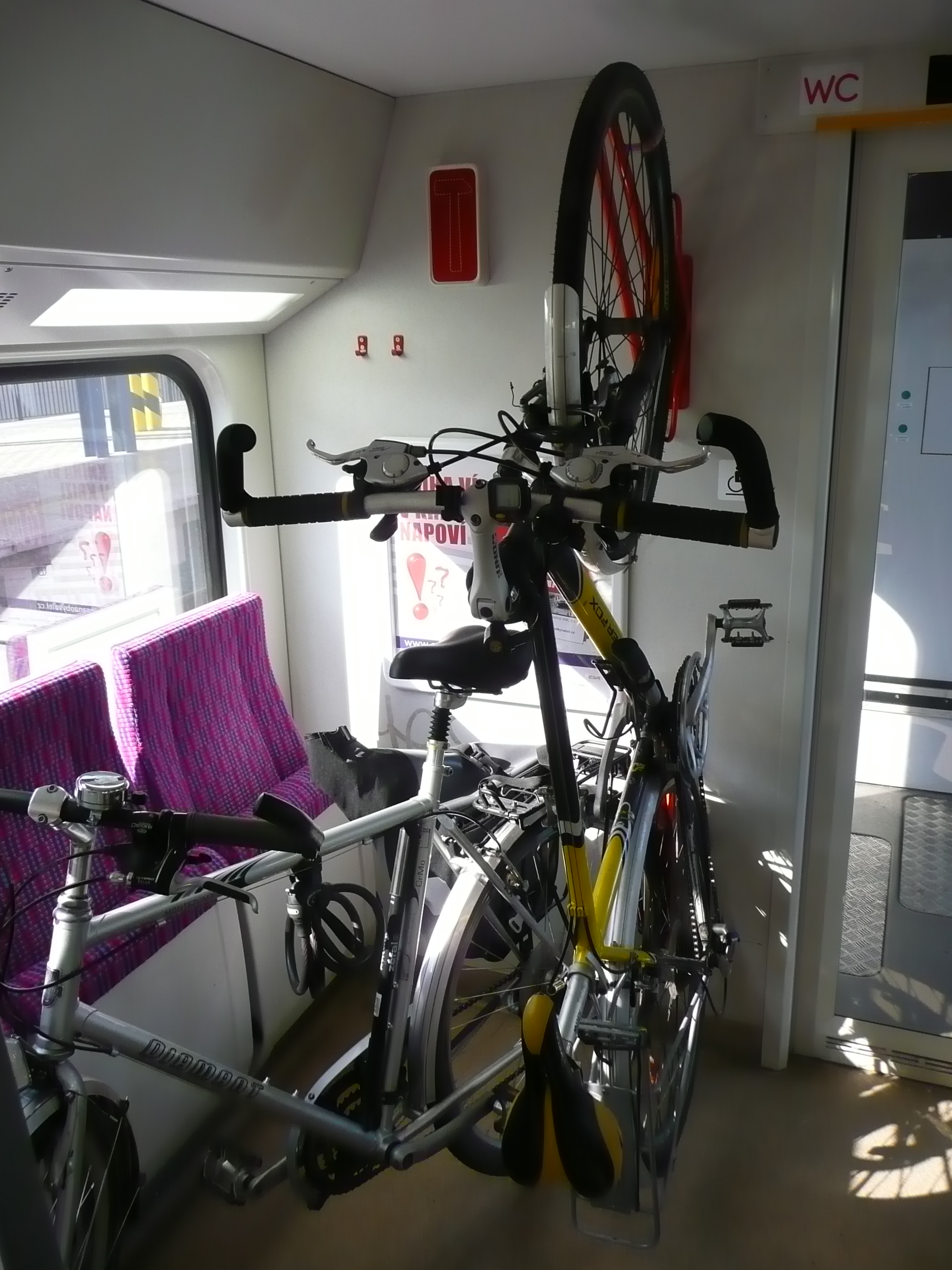
Load compartement with bicycle stand for bicycles
