= UZ Class 675 =

EJ 675
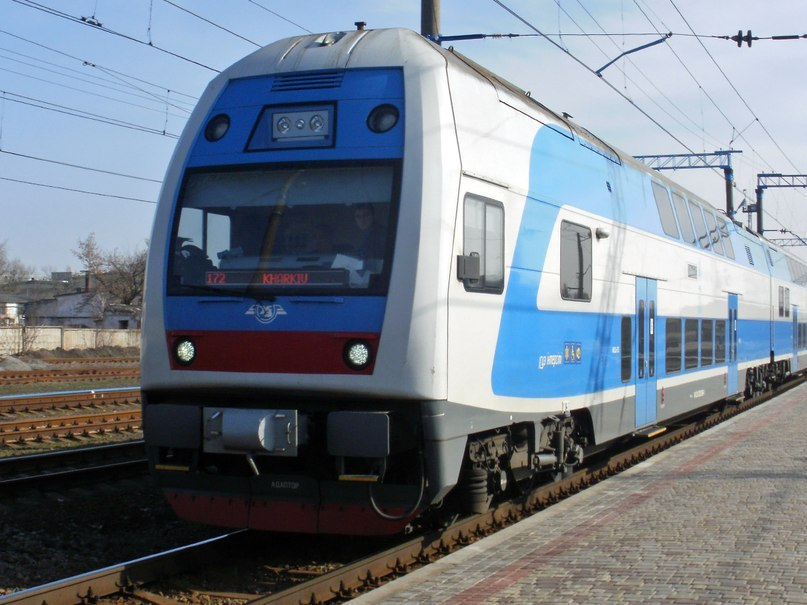
- Manufacturer: Škoda Transportation
- Constructed: 2011–2012
- Entered service: 2012
- Refurbished: 2021
- Number built: 2
- Number in service: 2
- Formation: 6 cars per 1 train set
- Capacity: Total: 623; First class: 46; Second class: 577
- Operators: Ukrainian Railways (UZ Class 675); Lithuanian Railways (LG Class 575)
- Depots: PW-1 Kharkiv-Assorting, TPS "Darnytsa"
- Lines served: Lutsk–Kyiv, Kyiv–Chernihiv

Specifications
- Car body construction: Aluminium
- Car length: 158,400 mm (519 ft 8 in)
- Width: 2,820 mm (9 ft 3 in) (past); 3,400 mm (11 ft 2 in) (after overhaul)
- Height: 5,000 mm (16 ft 5 in)
- Doors: Electric plug-in doors
- Maximum speed: 160 km/h (99 mph)
- Power supply: 3 kV DC & 25 kV AC
- Bogies: Bolsterless, out-board type
- Braking system: A microprocessor-based electro-pneumatic brake
- Track gauge: 1,520 mm (4 ft 11 27/32 in)

EJ 675 (Czech: Elektrická Jednotka, type 675) is a double-decker electric multiple unit by Škoda Vagonka a subsidiary of Škoda Transportation, operated by the Ukrainian state railways Ukrzaliznytsia. It is a variant of the Czech Railways class 471 "City Elefant" adapted for 1,520 mm gauge railways.

== History ==
Two electric trains of the 675 EJ series were purchased Ukrzaliznytsia Southern Railways in preparation for the UEFA Euro 2012 soccer championship for EUR 39.9 million. They were to be the first of a series of between 50 and 60 trains intended to reorganize inter-regional passenger traffic, however no further units were purchased.

The trains were used on a series of routes, centered around Kharkiv reaching Donetsk, Dnipro, Kyiv, Luhansk, Mariupol and Simferopol. Following the 2014 Russian occupation of Crimea, Donetsk and Luhansk, the trains served mainly the route between Kharkiv and Kyiv, gradually extended westwards towards Vinnytsia and Ternopil.

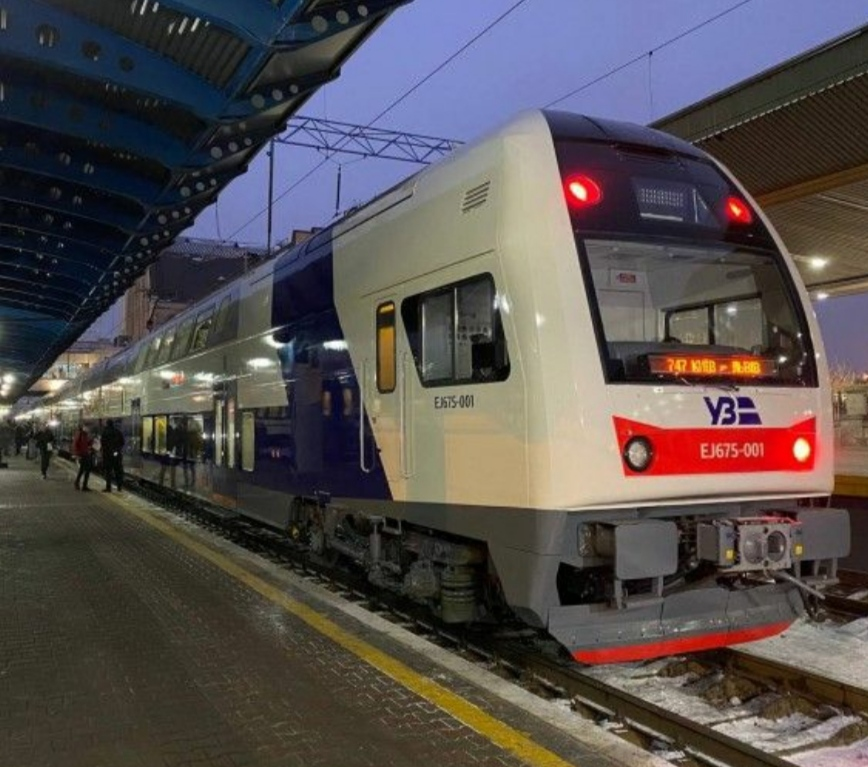
EJ675 with new livery in Kyiv-Pasazhyrskyi railway station

In April 2021 the trainsets were undergoing major repairs in Ukrzaliznytsia's own Kyiv Electric Car Repair Plant and by the Czech Škoda manufacturer in the Czech Republic. One of the two trains will be providing an additional 2023 around-Christmas-time service on Kyiv-Lviv route.

=== Characterization and electric equipment ===
The electric multiple unit consists of two power cars and four trailer cars in between. It has at total of 623 seats, of which 46 are first class (on the second floor of power cars), 577 are second class. The trains are equipped with 4 lifts for wheelchairs and special toilets.

Car bodies made of aluminium.

The total traction power is 4,000 kW (8 induction motors of 500 kW each).
