= BLS RABe 515 =

Swiss bilevel commuter train

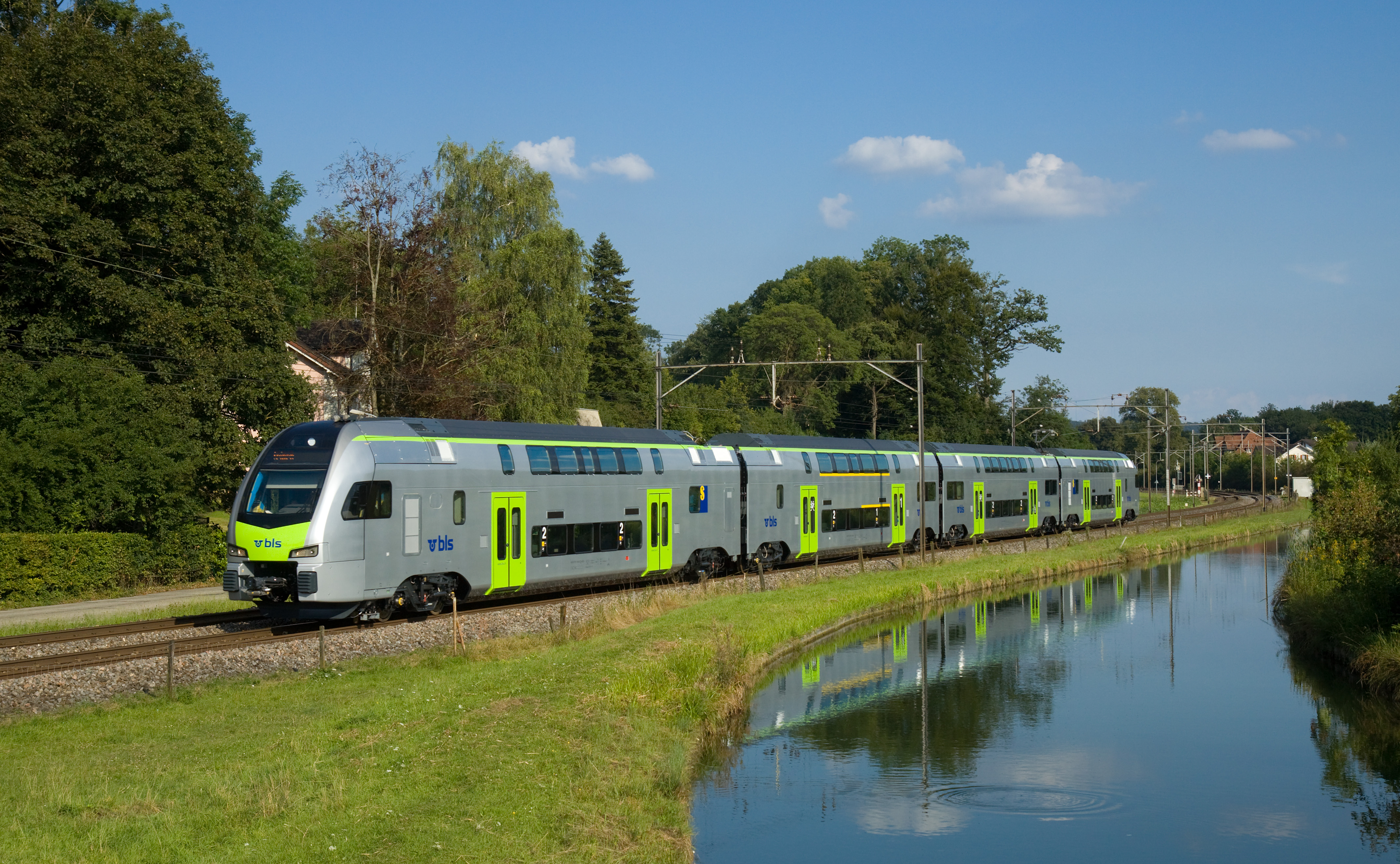
- Four-car formation near Bürglen in 2012

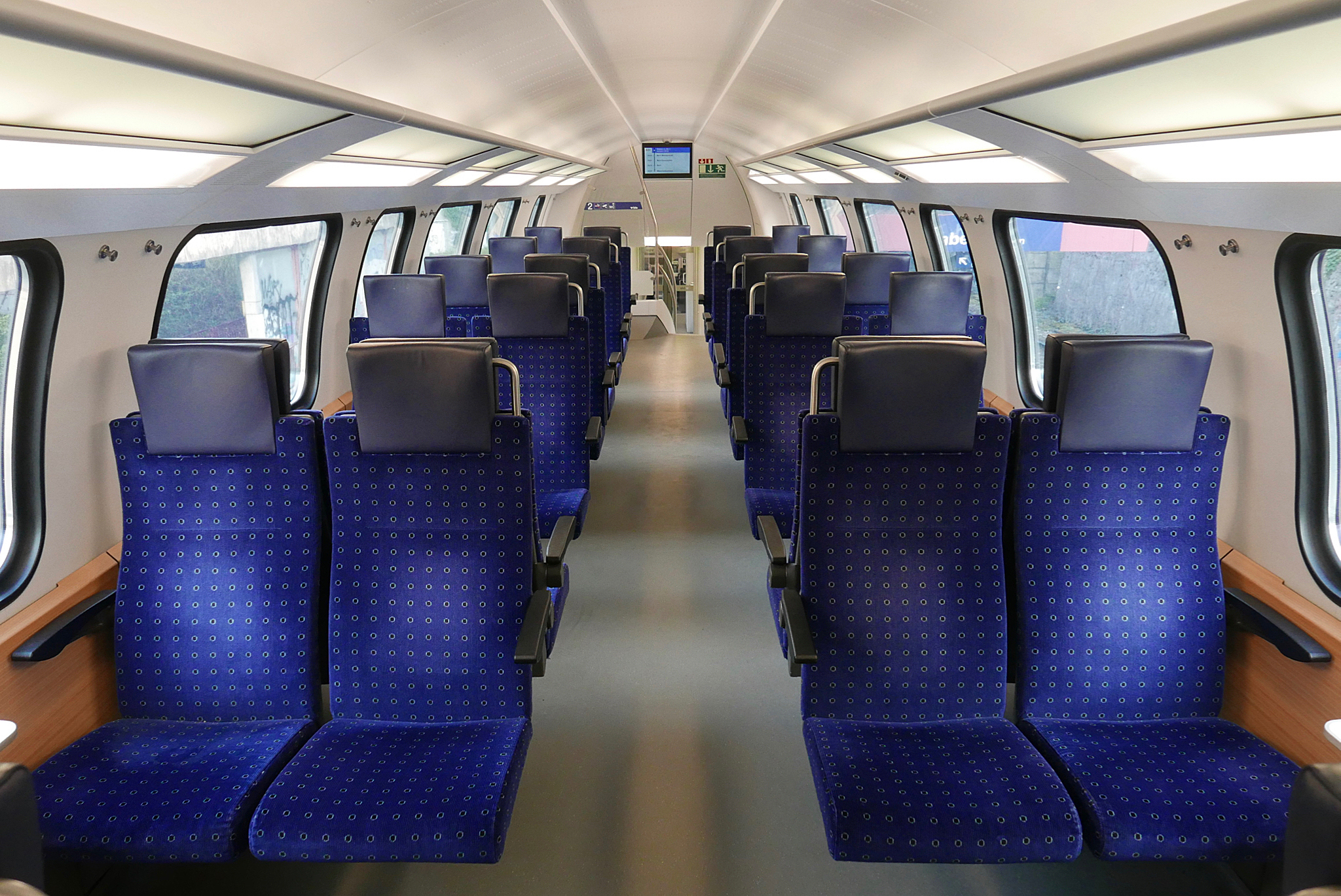
- Second class interior, upper level
- In service: 2012–present
- Manufacturer: Stadler Rail
- Family name: Stadler KISS
- Number built: 39
- Number in service: 39
- Formation: 4–6 cars
- Fleet numbers: 001–039
- Capacity: 335–546
- Operators: BLS AG; BLS Fernverkehr AG

Specifications
- Train length: 102.6–151.88 m (336.6–498.3 ft)
- Weight: 216–310 t (213–305 long tons; 238–342 short tons)
- Power output: 4,000 kW (5,400 hp)
- Electric system: 15 kV 16.7 Hz AC

The BLS RABe 515, also known as MUTZ, (Note: German: moderner, universeller triebzug, lit. 'modern, universal multiple unit train') is a class of bilevel electric multiple units manufactured by Stadler Rail for BLS AG. It is a second-generation derivative of the Stadler KISS. Formations are composed of four or six cars. They were the first bilevel cars used by BLS.

== History ==
BLS ordered 28 four-car trainsets in March 2010 at a cost of CHF 494 million. BLS planned to use the cars on various Bern S-Bahn routes. The first trains entered service on 19 September 2012. All 28 trains were in service by the December 2014 timetable change. BLS ordered three more trainsets in 2015, also for use on S-Bahn routes. In 2018, BLS exercised an option for eight more trainsets for use on long-distance routes between Bern and Biel/Bienne and Bern and Olten. Five of these use an extended six-car formation.

== Design ==
The four-car formation is 102,240 millimetres (335 ft 5 3/16 in) long. Cars stand 4,595 millimetres (15 ft 7/8 in) tall and are 2,800 millimetres (9 ft 2 1/4 in) wide. The four-car trains have seating for 335 passengers; the six-car trains can accommodate 546. The design speed is 160 kilometres per hour (99 mph).

In both formations there are cabs at the front and rear ends. The four-car formation has a single car with split first class and second class seating, with the six-car formation has two such cars. Passengers sit on both levels of the cars. The cars are low floor. Stairs at each end of each car permit access to the gangway between cars and to the upper level.

== Operation ==
As of 2022, the BLS RABe 515 is used on the S1, S3, S31, and S6 of the Bern S-Bahn, and on the Bern–Biel/Bienne and Bern–Olten InterRegio services.

== Naming ==
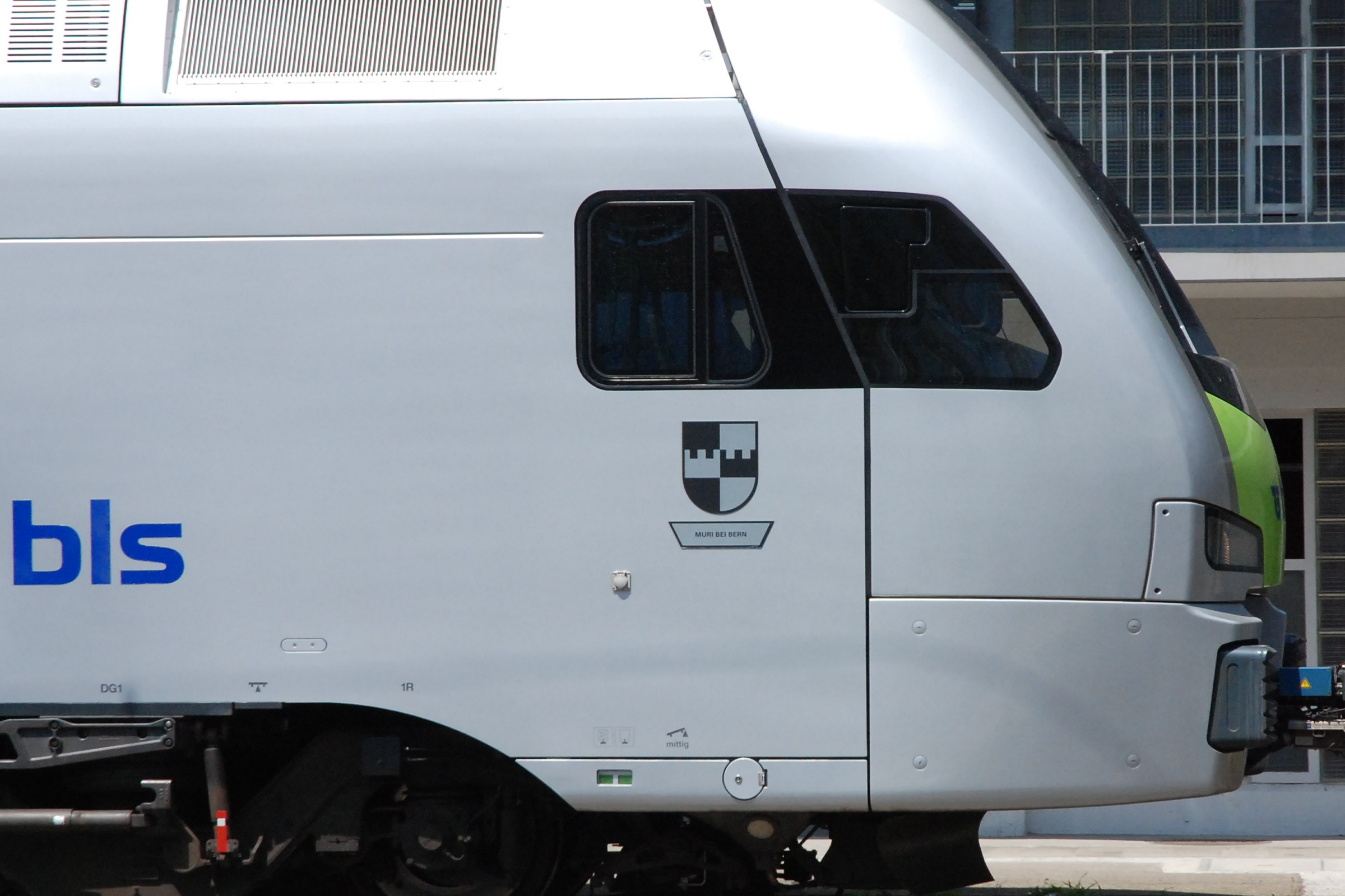
RABe 515 009 is named after 'Muri bei Bern'

It is common practice for railway companies in Switzerland to name their locomotives (e.g. SBB Re 620, BLS Re 465) and MUs (e.g. SBB RABe 501, SOB RABe 526, BLS RABe 525, BLS RABe 528). Twelve BLS RABe 515 are named after communes in the cantons of Bern, Fribourg, Neuchâtel and Solothurn, each displaying also the respective coat of arms (COA). RABe 515 008 has a special livery.

| № | COA | Name | № | COA | Name | № | COA | Name |
|---|---|---|---|---|---|---|---|---|
| 515 001 | | Stadt Bern | 515 009 | | Muri bei Bern | 515 018 | | Stadt Langenthal |
| 515 003 | | Düdingen | 515 012 | | Lyss | 515 020 | | Schwarzenburg |
| 515 004 | | Ville de Neuchâtel | 515 013 | | Fribourg/Freiburg | 515 035 | | Olten |
| 515 006 | | Köniz | 515 014 | | Interlaken | 515 036 | | Biel/Bienne |
