= List of Kyoto Municipal Subway stations =

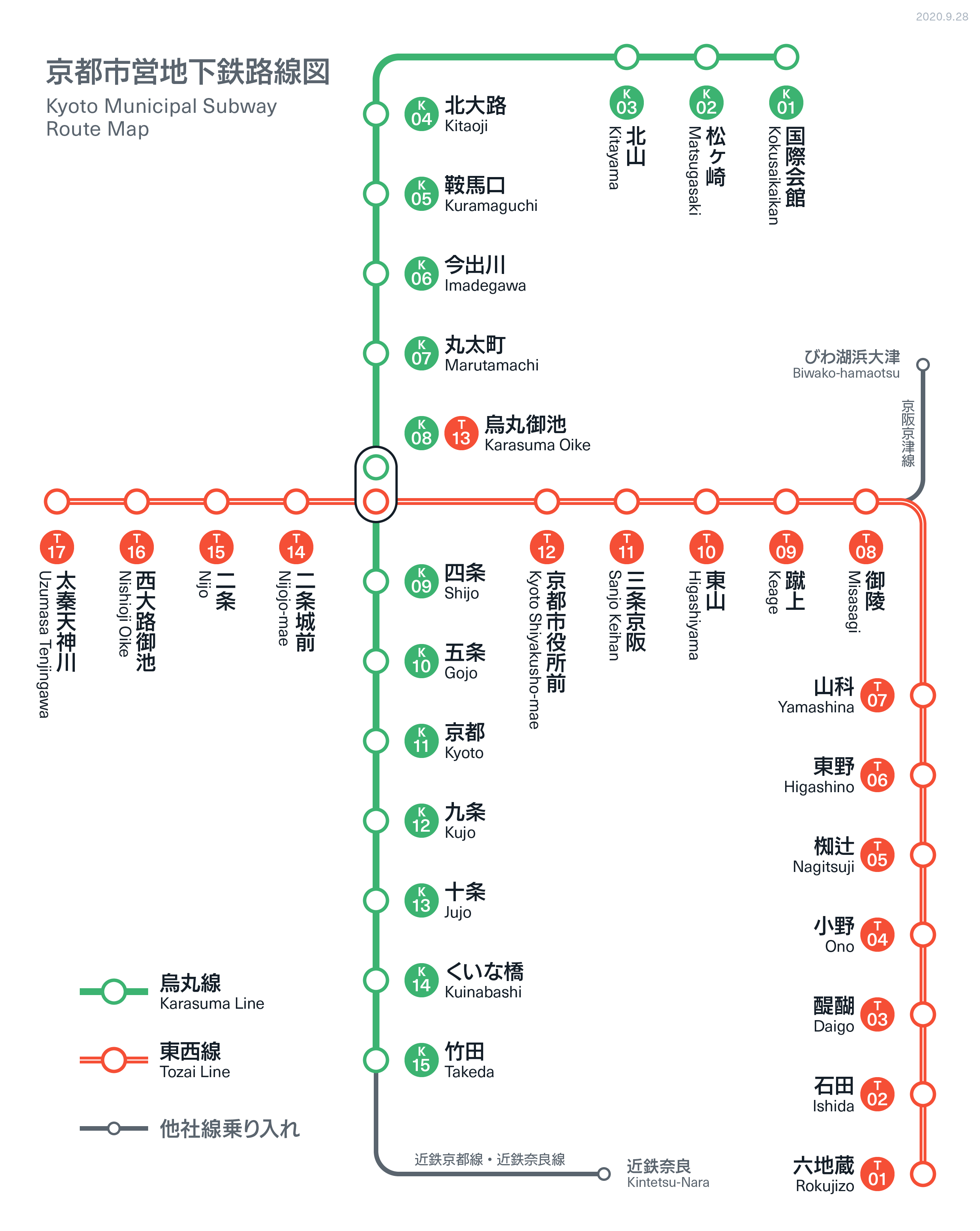
Kyoto Municipal Subway network map

There are currently 31 stations on the Kyoto Municipal Subway network operated by the Kyoto Municipal Transportation Bureau. The first section to open was the Karasuma Line, which began operation in May 1981 between Kitaōji Station and Kyoto Station.

As of 2025, the network extends 31.2 km (19.4 mi) and consists of two lines; he Karasuma Line and the Tozai Line crossing in central Kyoto at Karasuma Oike Station.

== Overview ==
- Karasuma Line: Runs north to south from Kokusaikaikan to Takeda, where it connects with the Kintetsu Kyoto Line for through services to Nara.
- Tozai Line: Runs east to west from Rokujizō to Uzumasa Tenjingawa, providing access to major sites like Nijo Castle and connecting with the Keihan Railway at Misasagi.

== Stations ==
=== Karasuma Line ===
| No. | Station name | Japanese | Distance (km) | Transfers | Location |
|---|---|---|---|---|---|
| K01 | Kokusaikaikan | 国際会館 | 0.0 | | Sakyo-ku, Kyoto |
| K02 | Matsugasaki | 松ヶ崎 | 1.6 | | Sakyo-ku, Kyoto |
| K03 | Kitayama | 北山 | 2.6 | | Kita-ku, Kyoto |
| K04 | Kitaōji | 北大路 | 3.8 | | Kita-ku, Kyoto |
| K05 | Kuramaguchi | 鞍馬口 | 4.6 | | Kamigyo-ku, Kyoto |
| K06 | Imadegawa | 今出川 | 5.4 | | Kamigyo-ku, Kyoto |
| K07 | Marutamachi | 丸太町 | 6.9 | | Nakagyo-ku, Kyoto |
| K08 | Karasuma Oike | 烏丸御池 | 7.6 | Tōzai Line (T13) | Nakagyo-ku, Kyoto |
| K09 | Shijō | 四条 | 8.5 | Hankyu Kyoto Line (HK-85: Karasuma Station) | Shimogyo-ku, Kyoto |
| K10 | Gojō | 五条 | 9.3 | | Shimogyo-ku, Kyoto |
| K11 | Kyoto | 京都 | 10.3 | Tōkaidō Shinkansen; A Tokaido Main Line (JR Kyoto Line, Biwako Line) (JR-A31); E San'in Main Line (Sagano Line) (JR-E01); D Nara Line (JR-D01); B Kyoto Line (B01) | Shimogyo-ku, Kyoto |
| K12 | Kujō | 九条 | 11.1 | | Minami-ku, Kyoto |
| K13 | Jūjō | 十条 | 11.8 | | Minami-ku, Kyoto |
| K14 | Kuinabashi | くいな橋 | 13.0 | | Fushimi-ku, Kyoto |
| K15 | Takeda | 竹田 | 13.7 | B Kyoto Line (B05, through trains available) | Fushimi-ku, Kyoto |

=== Tōzai Line ===
| No. | Station | Japanese | Distance (km) | Transfers | Location | |
|---|---|---|---|---|---|---|
| T01 | Rokujizō | 六地蔵 | 0.0 | D Nara Line (D06); Keihan Uji Line (KH73) | Uji | |
| T02 | Ishida | 石田 | 1.1 | | Fushimi-ku | Kyoto |
| T03 | Daigo | 醍醐 | 2.4 | | Fushimi-ku | Kyoto |
| T04 | Ono | 小野 | 3.6 | | Yamashina-ku | Kyoto |
| T05 | Nagitsuji | 椥辻 | 4.9 | | Yamashina-ku | Kyoto |
| T06 | Higashino | 東野 | 5.9 | | Yamashina-ku | Kyoto |
| T07 | Yamashina | 山科 | 7.0 | A Tōkaidō Main Line (Biwako Line) (A30); B Kosei Line (B30); Keihan Keishin Line | Yamashina-ku | Kyoto |
| T08 | Misasagi | 御陵 | 8.7 | Keihan Keishin Line (Through service) | Yamashina-ku | Kyoto |
| T09 | Keage | 蹴上 | 10.5 | | Higashiyama-ku | Kyoto |
| T10 | Higashiyama | 東山 | 11.5 | | Higashiyama-ku | Kyoto |
| T11 | Sanjo Keihan | 三条京阪 | 12.1 | Keihan Main Line (KH40 at Sanjo); Keihan Oto Line (KH40 at Sanjo) | Higashiyama-ku | Kyoto |
| T12 | Kyoto Shiyakusho-mae (Kawaramachi Oike) | 京都市役所前 | 12.6 | | Nakagyo-ku | Kyoto |
| T13 | Karasuma Oike | 烏丸御池 | 13.5 | Karasuma Line (K08) | Nakagyo-ku | Kyoto |
| T14 | Nijojo-mae | 二条城前 | 14.3 | | Nakagyo-ku | Kyoto |
| T15 | Nijo | 二条 | 15.1 | E Sanin Main Line (Sagano Line) (E04) | Nakagyo-ku | Kyoto |
| T16 | Nishioji Oike | 西大路御池 | 16.2 | | Nakagyo-ku | Kyoto |
| T17 | Uzumasa Tenjingawa | 太秦天神川 | 17.5 | Randen Tram Arashiyama Main Line (A5 at Randen-Tenjingawa) | Ukyo-ku | Kyoto |
