= Karasuma =

Karasuma (written: 烏丸 or 烏間) may refer to:

== People ==
Karasuma is a Japanese surname. Notable people with the surname include:

- Leo Karasuma (レオ烏丸, died 1597), one of 26 Martyrs of Japan
- Yūichi Karasuma (烏丸 祐一, born 1982), Japanese voice actor
- Setsuko Karasuma (烏丸 せつこ, born 1955), Japanese actress
- Tasuku Karasuma (烏丸 匡, born 1978), Japanese manga artist

== Fictional characters ==
- Tadaomi Karasuma (烏間 惟臣), a character in the manga series Assassination Classroom
- Renya Karasuma (烏丸 蓮耶), a mysterious character in Case Closed also known as Detective Conan

== Others ==
- Karasuma Station, one of the busiest stations in Kyoto
- Karasuma Line, one of two lines of the Kyoto Municipal Subway
- Karasuma Street, a major south–north street in central Kyoto
