= Karasuma Oike Station =

Metro station in Kyoto, Japan

Coordinates: 35.0104°N 135.7598°E

K08 T13 Karasuma Oike Station 烏丸御池駅
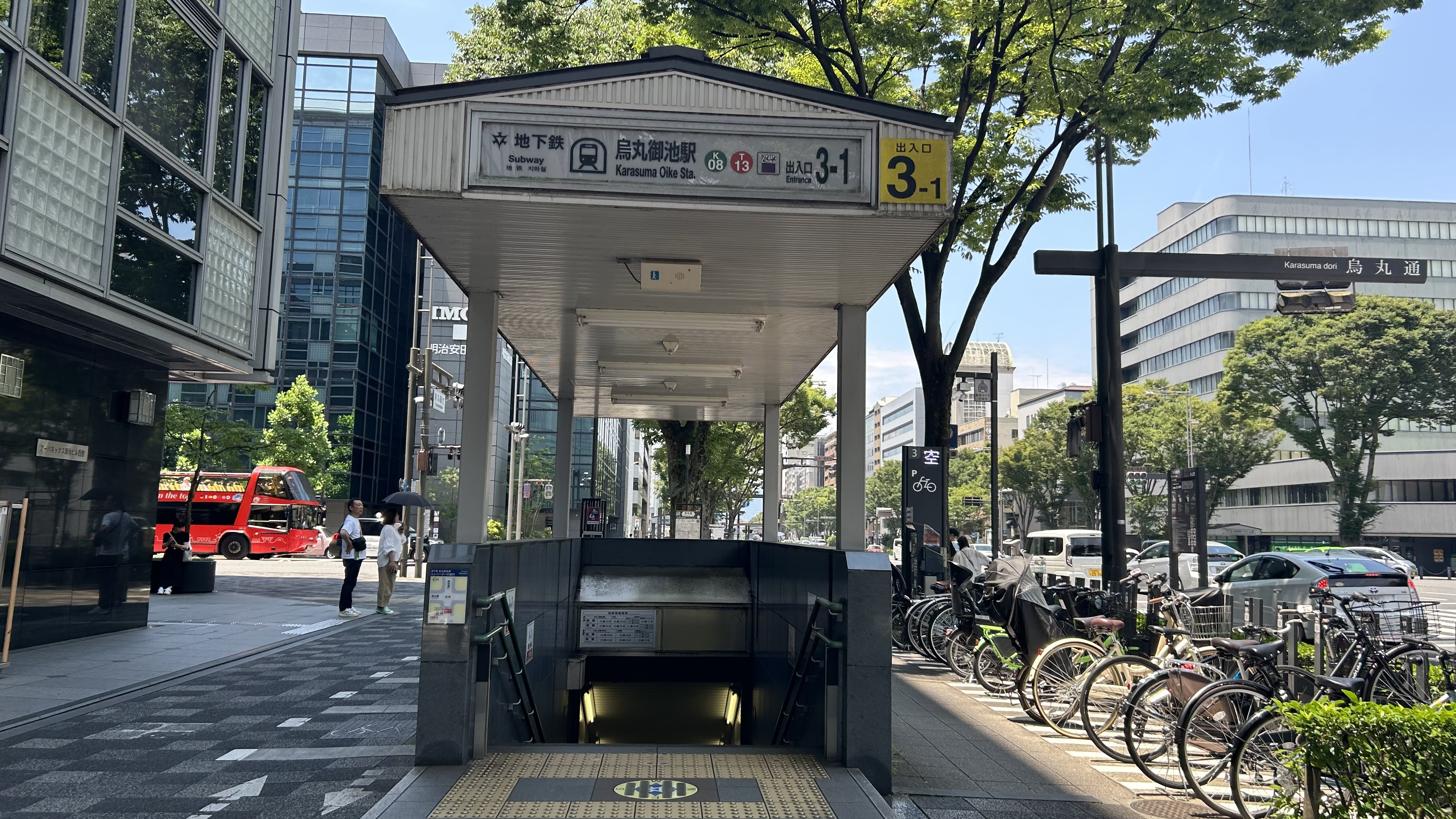

General information
- Location: Nakagyō, Kyoto, Kyoto; Japan
- Operator: Kyoto Municipal Subway
- Lines: Karasuma Line; Tōzai Line
- Platforms: 2 island platforms
- Tracks: 4

Other information
- Station code: K08, T13

History
- Opened: 29 May 1981; 45 years ago
- Former names: Oike (until 1997)

Passengers
- FY2016: 46,194 daily

Services
Preceding station	Kyoto Municipal Subway	Following station
Shijō K09 towards Takeda	Karasuma Line	Marutamachi K07 towards Kokusaikaikan
Nijōjō-mae T14 towards Uzumasa Tenjingawa	Tōzai Line	Kyōto Shiyakusho-mae T12 towards Rokujizō
Location

Karasuma Oike Station (烏丸御池駅, Karasuma Oike-eki; formerly named Oike Station (御池駅, Oike-eki) until May 21, 1997) is a train station on the Kyoto Municipal Subway Karasuma Line and Tōzai Line in Nakagyo-ku, Kyoto, Japan.

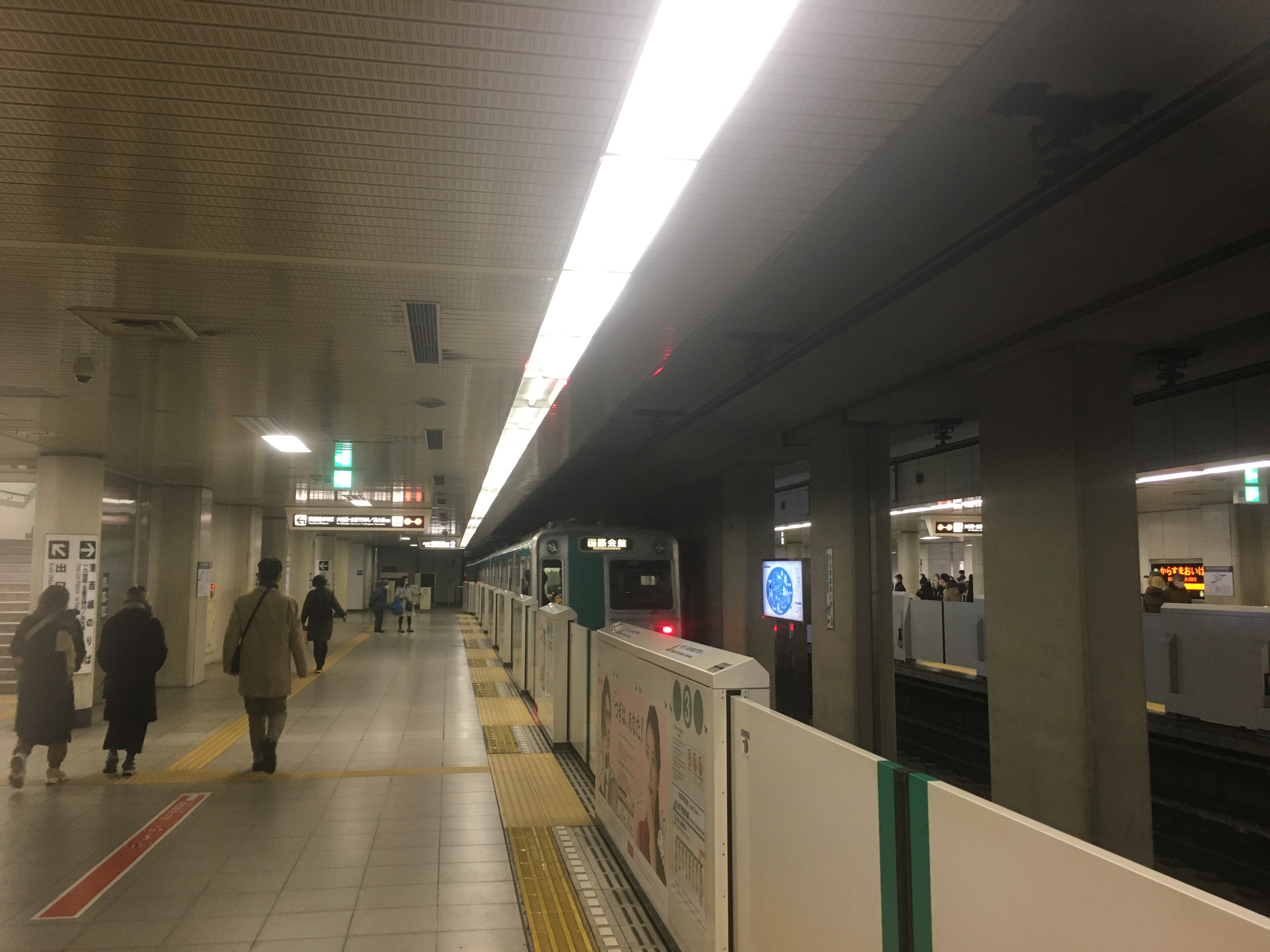
Karasuma line platforms, 2021

== Lines ==
- Kyoto Municipal Subway
  - Karasuma Line (Station Number: K08)
  - Tōzai Line (Station Number: T13)

== Layout ==
The station is the transferring station operated by Kyoto Municipal Transportation Bureau under Karasuma Oike Intersection on Karasuma Street and Oike Street. The two side platforms with two tracks for the Karasuma Line are located under the ticket gate floor, and the island platform with two tracks for the Tōzai Line is located under the Karasuma Line.

Karasuma Line

1	■ Karasuma Line	for Kyōto, Takeda and Kintetsu Kyoto Line (Shin-Tanabe, Nara)
2	■ Karasuma Line	for Imadegawa, Kitaōji and Kokusaikaikan

Tōzai Line

1	■ Tōzai Line	for Nijō and Uzumasa Tenjingawa
2	■ Tōzai Line	for Misasagi, Rokujizō and (Keihan Railway Keishin Line) Hamaōtsu

== Surroundings ==
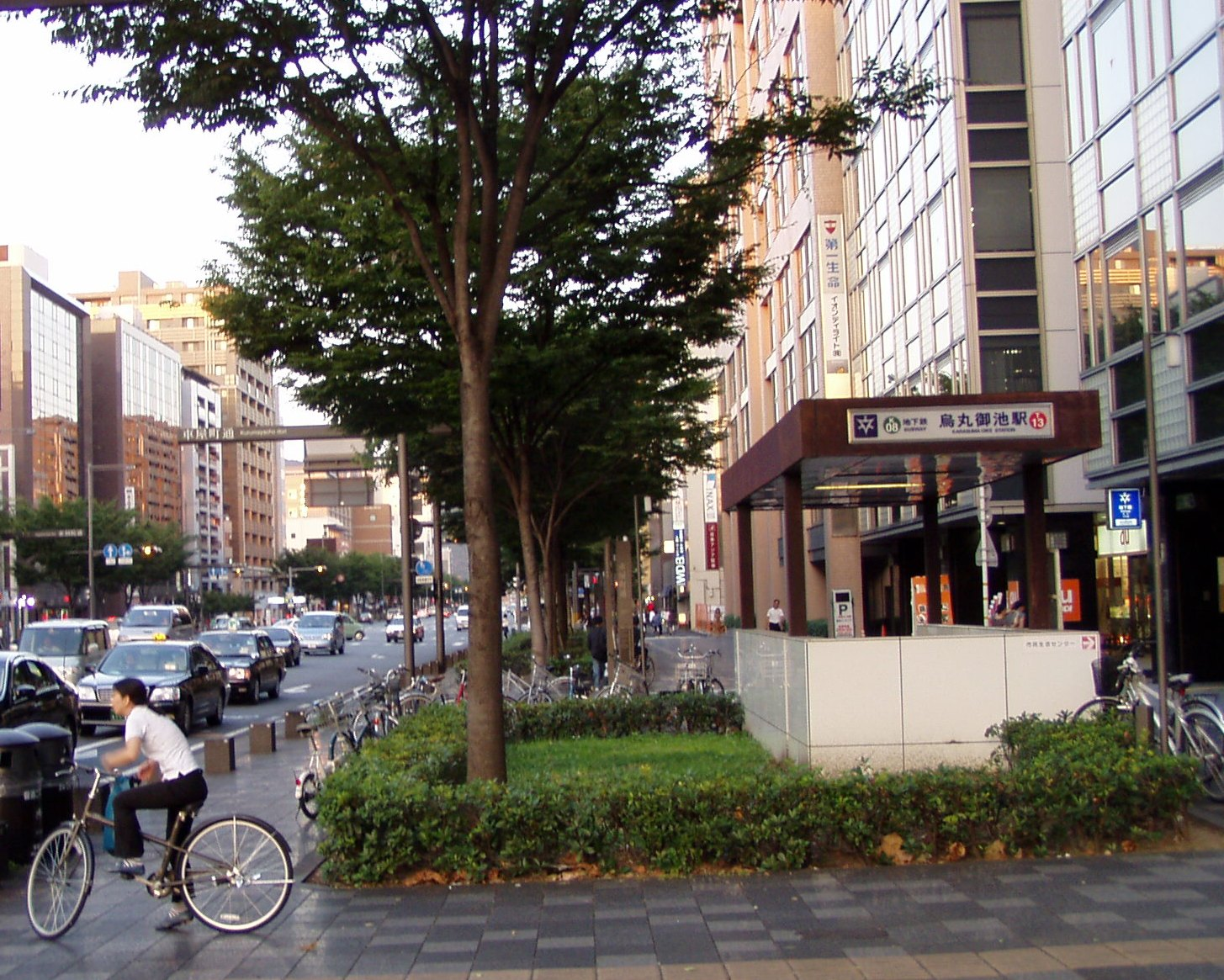
Station entrance, August 2007

- Ace Hotel Kyoto
- Adachi Hospital
- Hello Work Plaza Karasuma Oike
- Karasuma Oike Intersection
- Kyoto International Manga Museum
- The Museum of Kyoto
- Nakagyo-ku Post Office
- NHK Kyoto Broadcast Station
- Nichicon Corporation
- ShinPuhKan mall

== History ==
- May 29, 1981 - Oike Station was opened on the same day as the opening of the Kyoto Subway Karasuma Line from Kitaoji to Kyoto.
- August 28, 1988 - Through service to and from the Kintetsu Kyoto Line started.
- May 22, 1997 - Oike Station was renamed Karasuma-Oike Station to prepare to connect to the Tozai Line from Daigo to Nijo.
- October 12, 1997 - The Tozai Line was opened.
- April 1, 2007 - PiTaPa service started.
- January 16, 2008 - Through service to and from the Keihan Railway Keishin Line started on the same day as the extension of the Tozai Line from Nijo to Uzumasa Tenjingawa.
- May 16, 2011 - Underground shopping area Kotochika Oike opened.
