= Shijō =

Shijō (四条 or 四條) literally means fourth street in Japanese. It may refer to:

== Art ==
- Shijō school, a Japanese school of painting

== Names ==
- Emperor Shijō, the 87th Emperor of Japan,
- a Japanese surname
  - Shijō family (四条家, Shijōke)—a Japanese kuge family descended from the Fujiwara Hokke (藤原北家)

== Places ==
- Shijō Street, one of east–west streets in the ancient capital of Heian-kyō, present-day Kyoto
- Train stations
  - Shijō Station, a train station on the Kyoto Municipal Subway Karasuma Line in Shimogyō-ku, Kyoto
  - Gion-Shijō Station, a train station on the Keihan Main Line in Higashiyama-ku, Kyoto, formerly known as Shijō Station
