= Marutamachi Station =

Metro station in Kyoto, Japan

K07 Marutamachi Station 丸太町駅

General information
- Location: Nakagyō-ku, Kyoto; Japan
- Coordinates: 35.0165°N 135.7597°E
- Operator: Kyoto Municipal Subway
- Line: Karasuma Line
- Platforms: 1 island platform
- Tracks: 2
- Connections: Bus stop

Other information
- Station code: K07

History
- Opened: 29 May 1981; 45 years ago

Passengers
- 2025: 26,532 daily

Services
| Preceding station | Kyoto Municipal Subway | Following station |
|---|---|---|
| Karasuma Oike K08 towards Takeda | Karasuma Line | Imadegawa K06 towards Kokusaikaikan |
Location

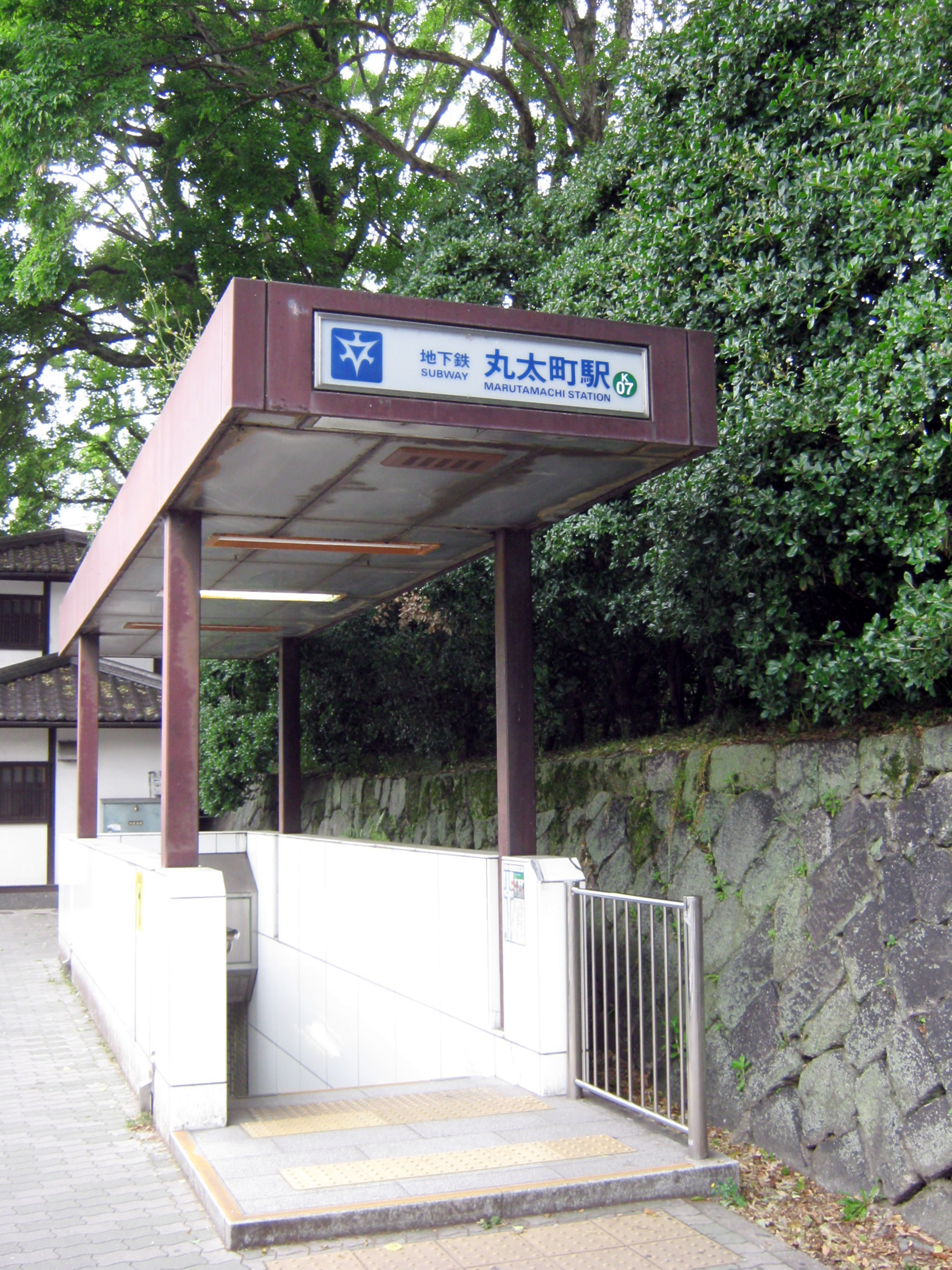
Entrance of the station by the wall of Kyoto Gyoen

Marutamachi Station (丸太町駅, Marutamachi-eki) is a train station on the Kyoto Municipal Subway Karasuma Line in Nakagyo-ku, Kyoto, Japan.

== Lines ==
- Kyoto Municipal Subway
  - Karasuma Line (Station Number: K07)

== Layout ==
The station is located beneath the intersection of Marutamachi-dōri and Karasuma-dōri (National Highway Route 367), and features a single island platform.

| 1 | ■ Karasuma Line | for Karasuma Oike, Shijo, Kyoto, Takeda and Kintetsu Kyoto Line (Shin-Tanabe / Nara) |
| 2 | ■ Karasuma Line | for Imadegawa, Kitaoji and Kokusaikaikan |

- Turnstiles are staffed at the North gate, while they are unstaffed at the South gate.
- Staffed turnstiles are towards exits 1–4, unstaffed turnstiles are towards exits 6 and 7, while exit 5 is in the very middle.

== Surroundings ==
north-east
- Kyoto Imperial Palace
- Kyoto District Court, Kyoto Summary Court
north-west
- Kyoto Prefectural Government Office
- Kyoto Prefectural Police
- Kyoto Architectural College
- Heian Jogakuin University, St. Agnes' Junior and Senior High School
- Kyoto Broadcasting System Co., Ltd.
- Japan Red Cross Society Kyoto Daini Hospital
- Agency for Cultural Affairs
south-east
- The Kyoto Shimbun

== Station History ==
- May 29, 1981 - Station opening.
- 14–16 November 2005 - Due to U.S. President George W. Bush's visit, station lockers and exit #1 are closed.
- 1 April 2007 - PiTaPa use begins.
