= Kuramaguchi Station =

Metro station in Kyoto, Japan

K05 Kuramaguchi Station 鞍馬口駅
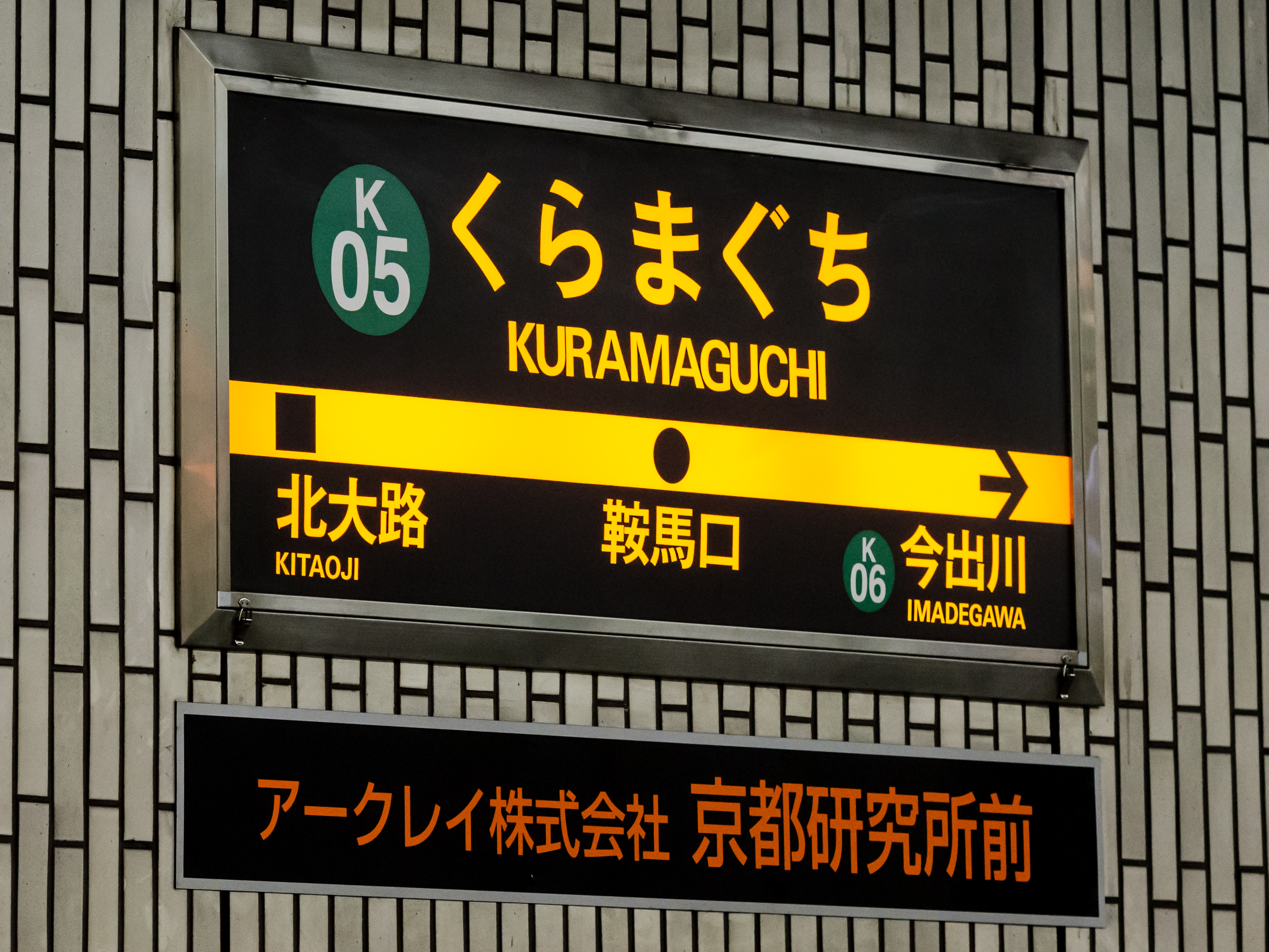
- One of the station signs at Kuramaguchi station

Japanese name
- Kanji: 鞍馬口駅
- Hiragana: くらまぐちえき

General information
- Location: Kamigyō-ku, Kyoto; Japan
- Coordinates: 35.0376°N 135.7594°E
- Operator: Kyoto Municipal Subway
- Line: Karasuma Line
- Platforms: 1 island platform
- Tracks: 2
- Connections: Bus stop

Other information
- Station code: K05

History
- Opened: 29 May 1981

Passengers
- FY2016: 9,911 daily

Services
Preceding station	Kyoto Municipal Subway	Following station
Imadegawa K06 towards Takeda	Karasuma Line	Kitaōji K04 towards Kokusaikaikan
Location

Kuramaguchi Station (鞍馬口駅, Kuramaguchi-eki) is a railway station on the Kyoto Municipal Subway Karasuma Line in Kamigyo-ku, Kyoto, Japan.

== History ==
During the planning stage of the Karasuma Line in 1972, this station was initially not included as there were not any major road intersections nearby. However, after requests by local residents and further evaluations, construction of the station was ratified in May 29, 1973.

== Lines ==
- Kyoto Municipal Subway
  - Karasuma Line (Station Number: K05)

== Layout ==
The station consists of one underground island platform serving two tracks.

=== Platforms ===
1	■ Karasuma Line	for Shijo, Kyoto, and Nara
2	■ Karasuma Line	for Kitaōji and Kokusaikaikan

== See also ==
- List of railway stations in Japan
