= Shijō Street =

Street in Kyoto, Japan

Coordinates: 35°00′14″N 135°46′38″E

- Kyoto City Route 186
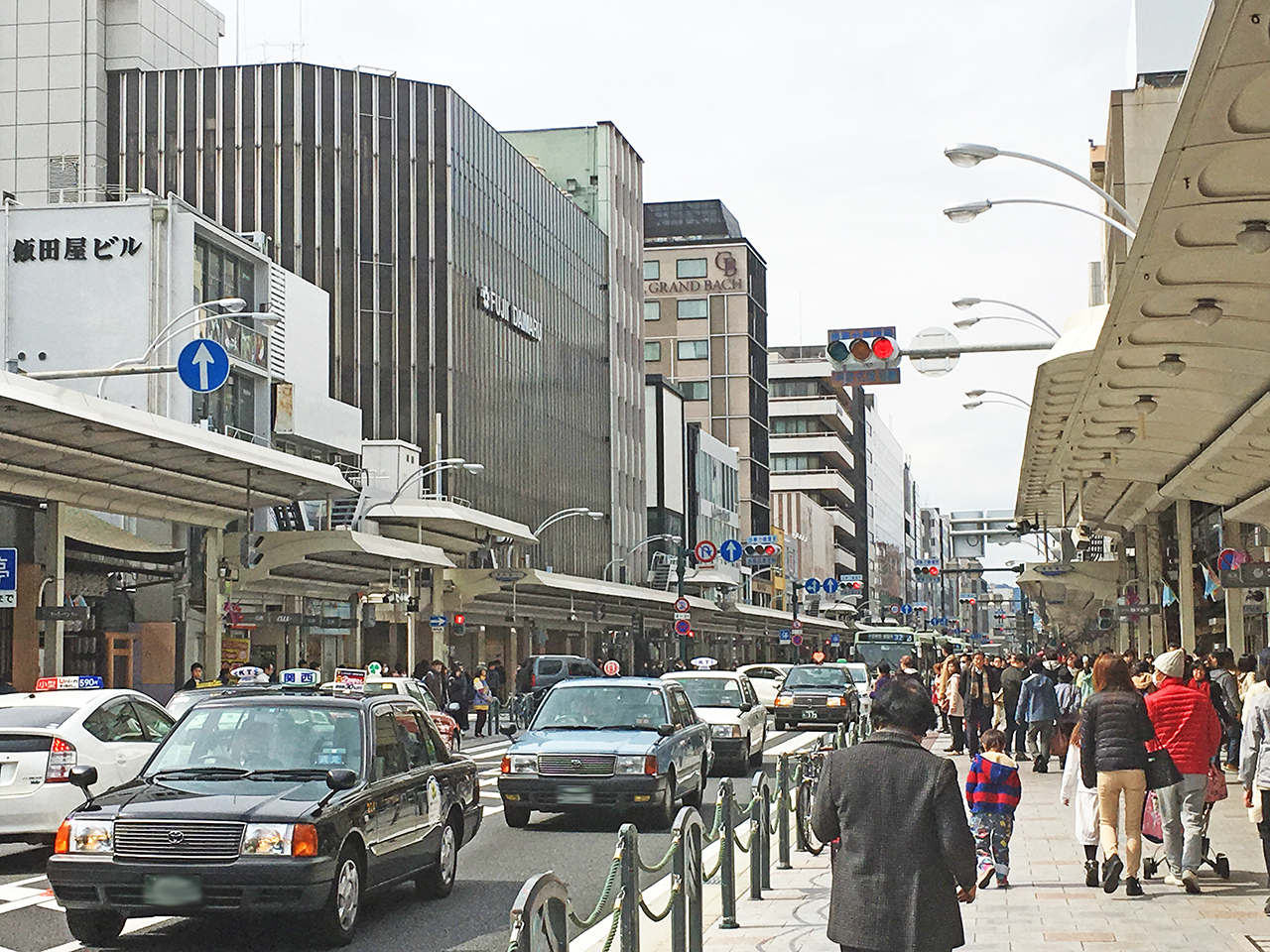
- A daytime scene on Shijo St
- Interactive map of Shijō Street
- Native name: 四条通 (Japanese); Shijō-dōri (Japanese)
- Location: Higashiyama-ku, Nakagyō-ku, Ukyō-ku and Nishikyō-ku in Kyoto
- East end: Yasaka Shrine
- Major junctions: Japan National Route 367 at Shijō Karasuma Intersection; Japan National Route 162 at Tenjingawa Shijō Intersection
- West end: Matsunoo-taisha

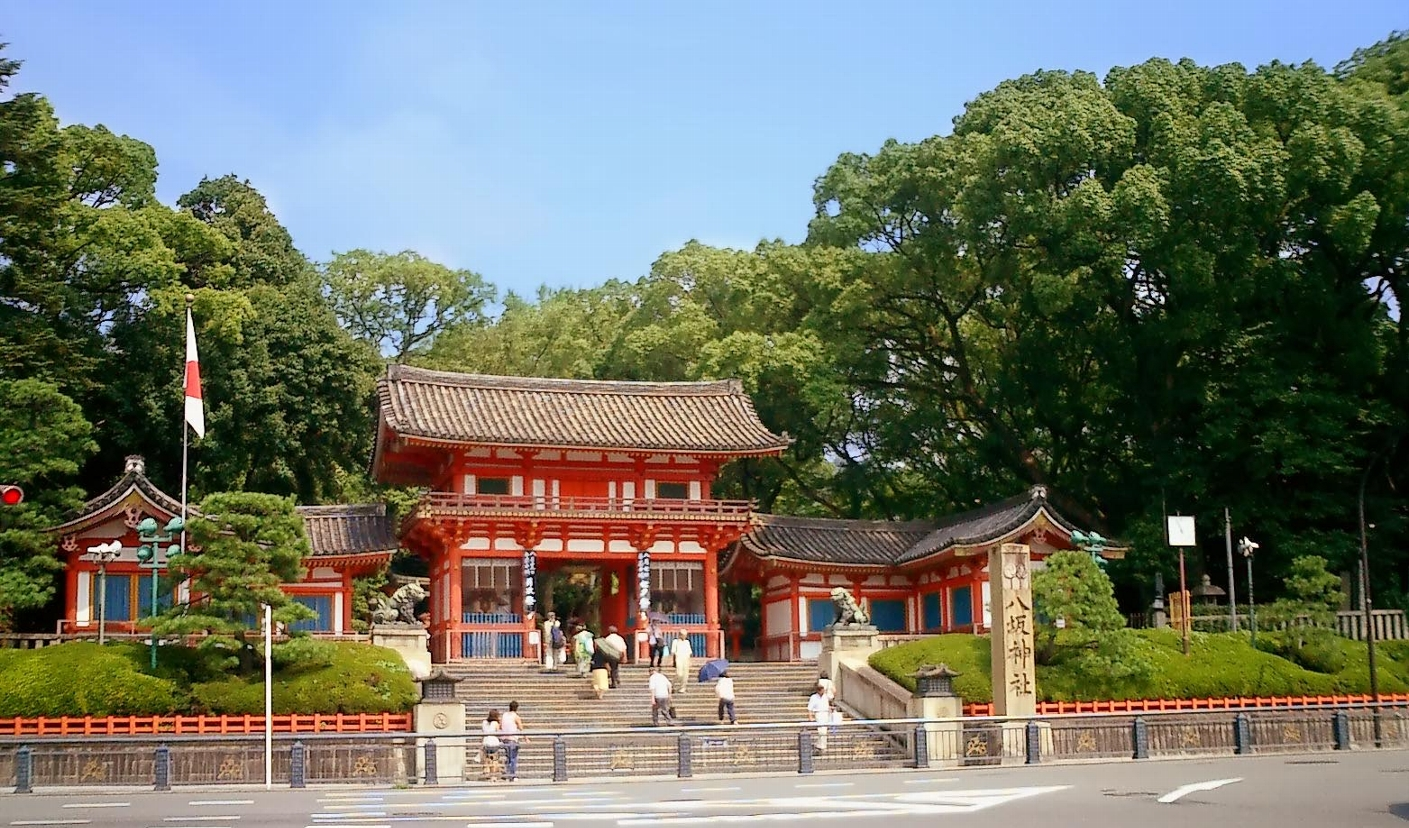
Yasaka Shrine, eastern end of the street

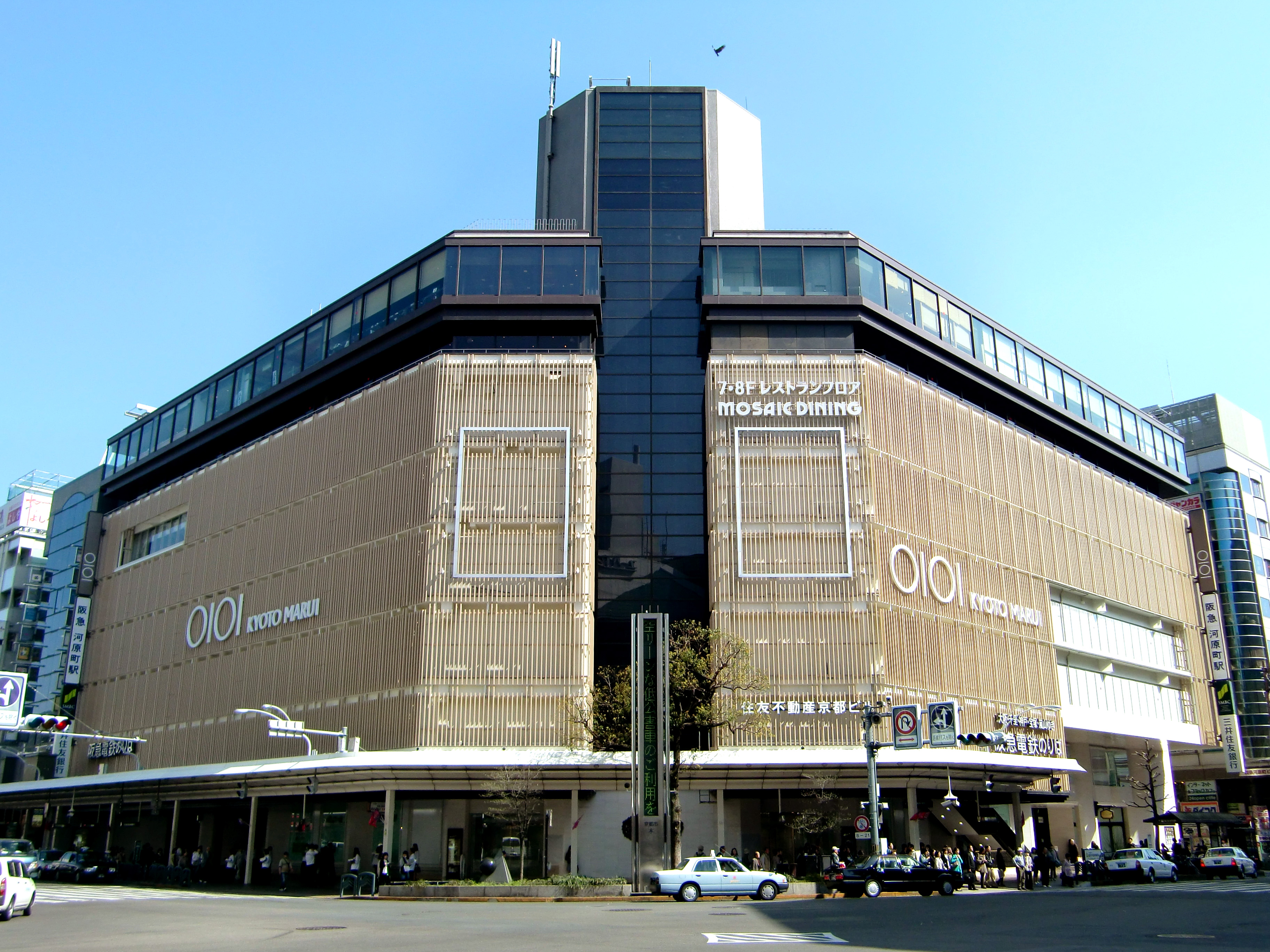
Kyoto Marui

Shijō Street (四条通, Shijō-dōri) runs in the center of Kyoto, Japan from east to west through the commercial center of the city. Shijō literally means Fourth Avenue of Heian-kyō, the ancient capital.

== History ==
The section between Shinkyōgoku street and the vicinity of the east side of the Tenjingawa river corresponds to the Shijō Ōji Avenue (四条大路) of the Heian-kyō. After the road was widened in 1911, it developed as an important traffic artery.

The Shijō school of art derives its name from this street, since many artists were located there.

== Along the street ==
The eastern end of the street is Yasaka Shrine and the western end is Matsunoo Shrine. The street is particularly busy with pedestrians and traffic from the east end to Karasuma Street. The east end passes through the courtesan's district of Gion, with the historic street of Hanami Lane branching off to the south, with the famous Ichiriki Chaya at the corner. It then crosses the Kamo River at Shijō Bridge, and from there to Karasuma Street (Shijō Karasuma) the sidewalk is covered (except at major streets) and features several department stores, such as Daimaru and Marui. The center of this area is the intersection with Kawaramachi Street (Shijō Kawaramachi), a very busy shopping area.

The city of Kyoto has enforced a smoking ban on this street, on the busy section from Yasaka Shrine to Karasuma street, and in the surrounding districts.

During the Gion Matsuri in the month of July, the Naginata-hoko, the Kanko-boko, Tsuki-hoko, Kakkyo-yama and Shijō-Kasa-Boko are built on the street. The street is also part of the route of the Yamaboko Junkō parade.

=== Relevant landmarks ===
- Yasaka Shrine
- Ichiriki-tei
- Chūgen-ji Temple
- Minami-za Theater
- Shijō Bridge
- Kamo River
- Shinkyōgoku Street
- Umenomiya Shrine
- Matsuo Bridge
- Katsura River
- Matsunoo-taisha
History

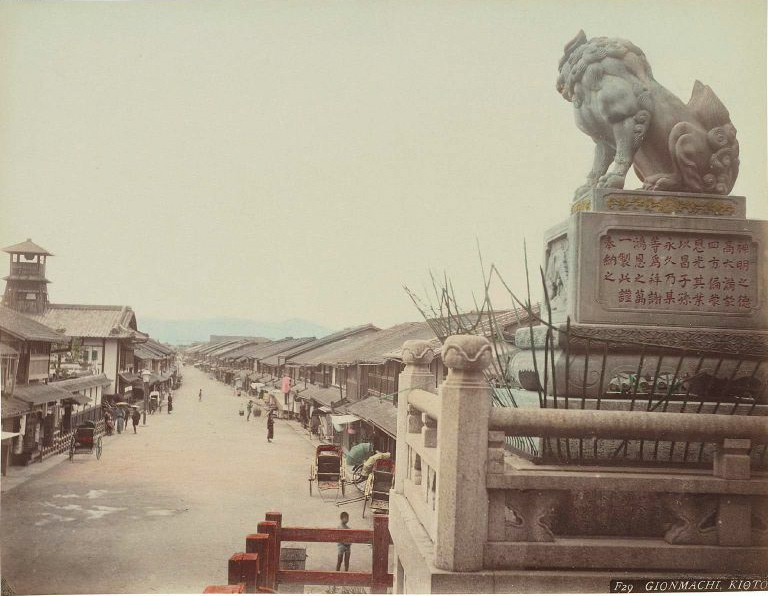
Shijō Street seen from Yasaka Shrine in 1886

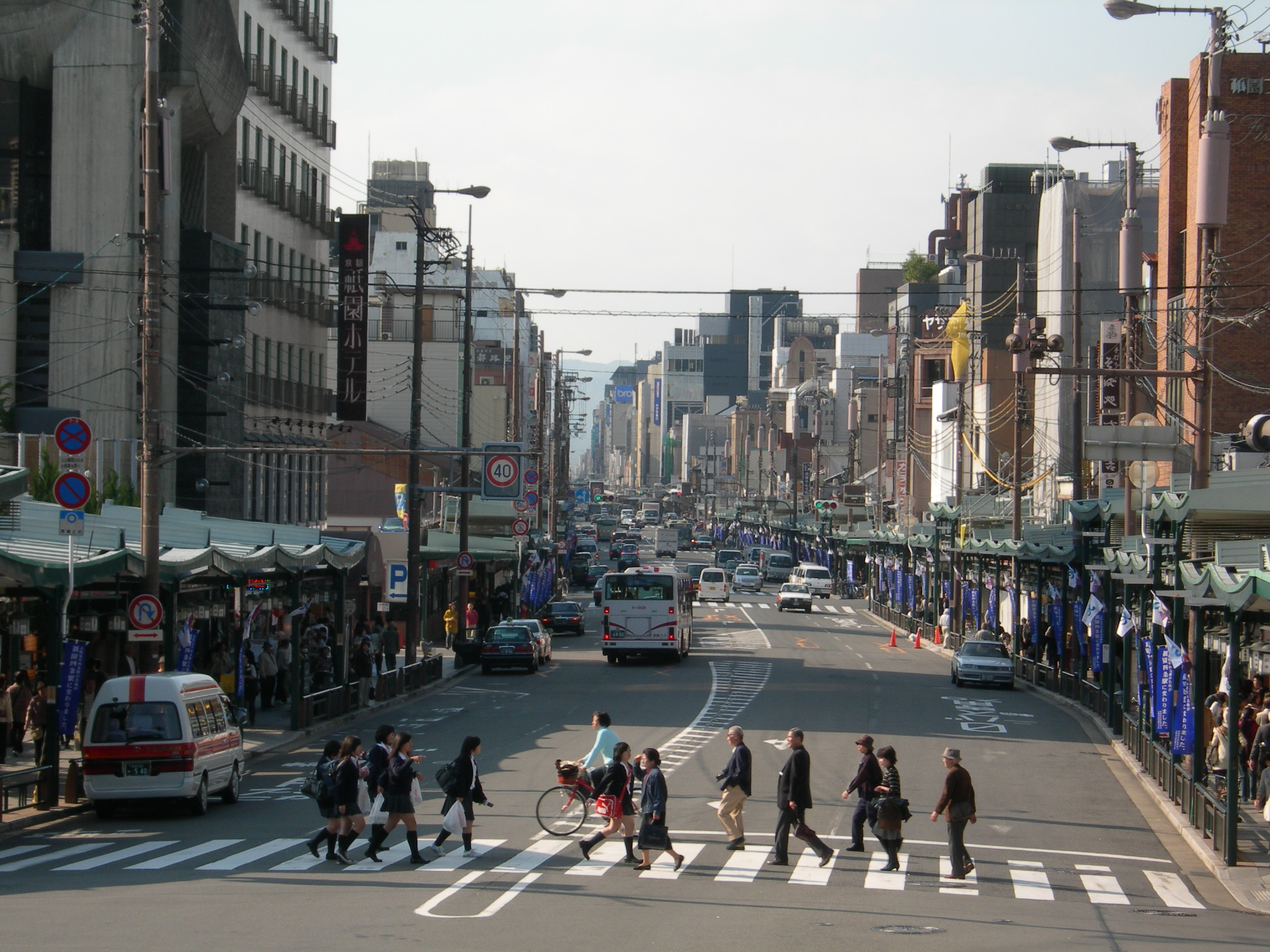
Shijō Street seen from Yasaka Shrine in 2008

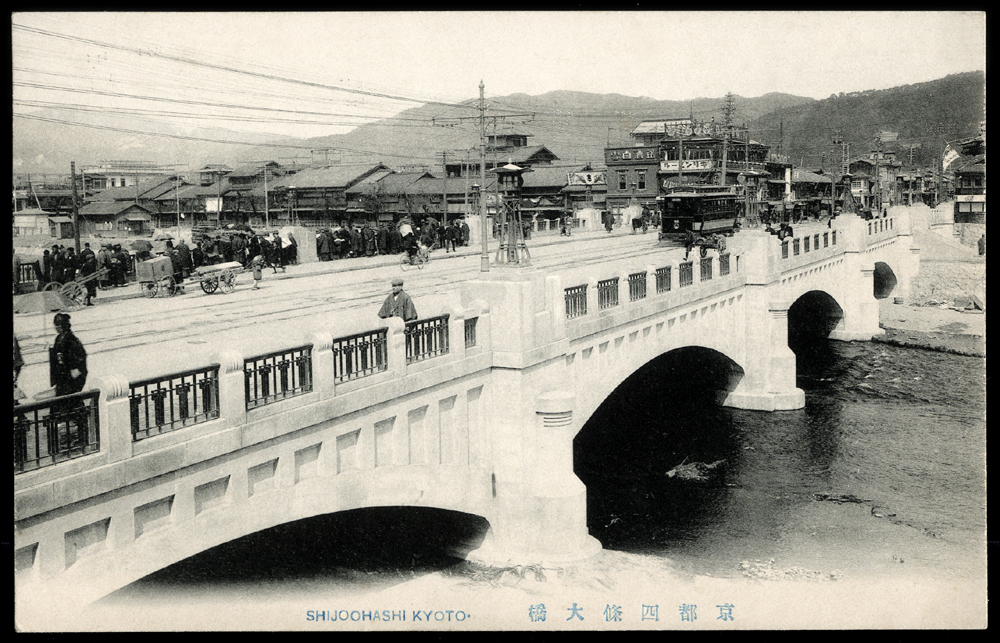
Shijō Ohashi on a postcard in Meiji era
Scenes on the street

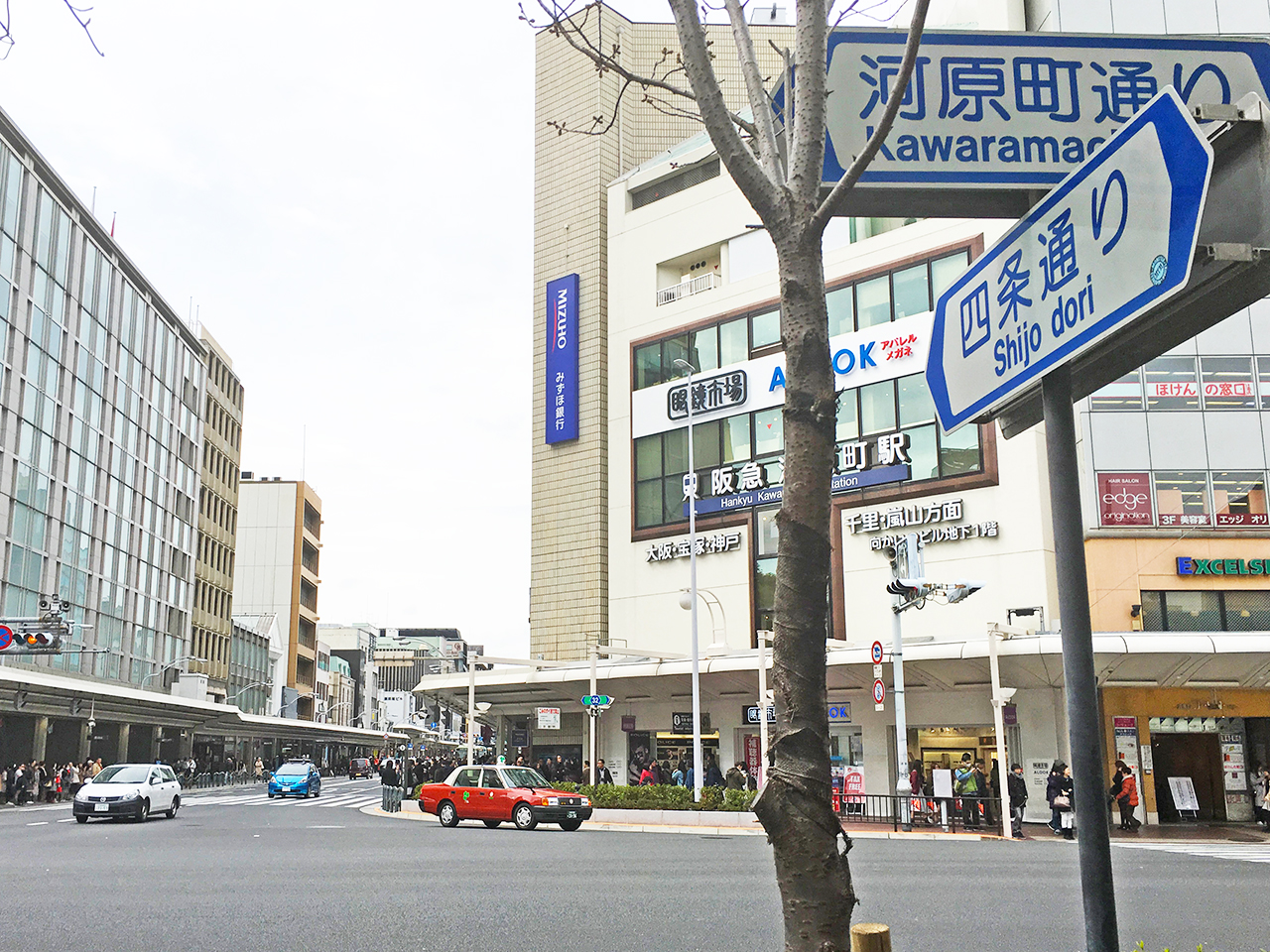
Shijō St & Kawaramachi St

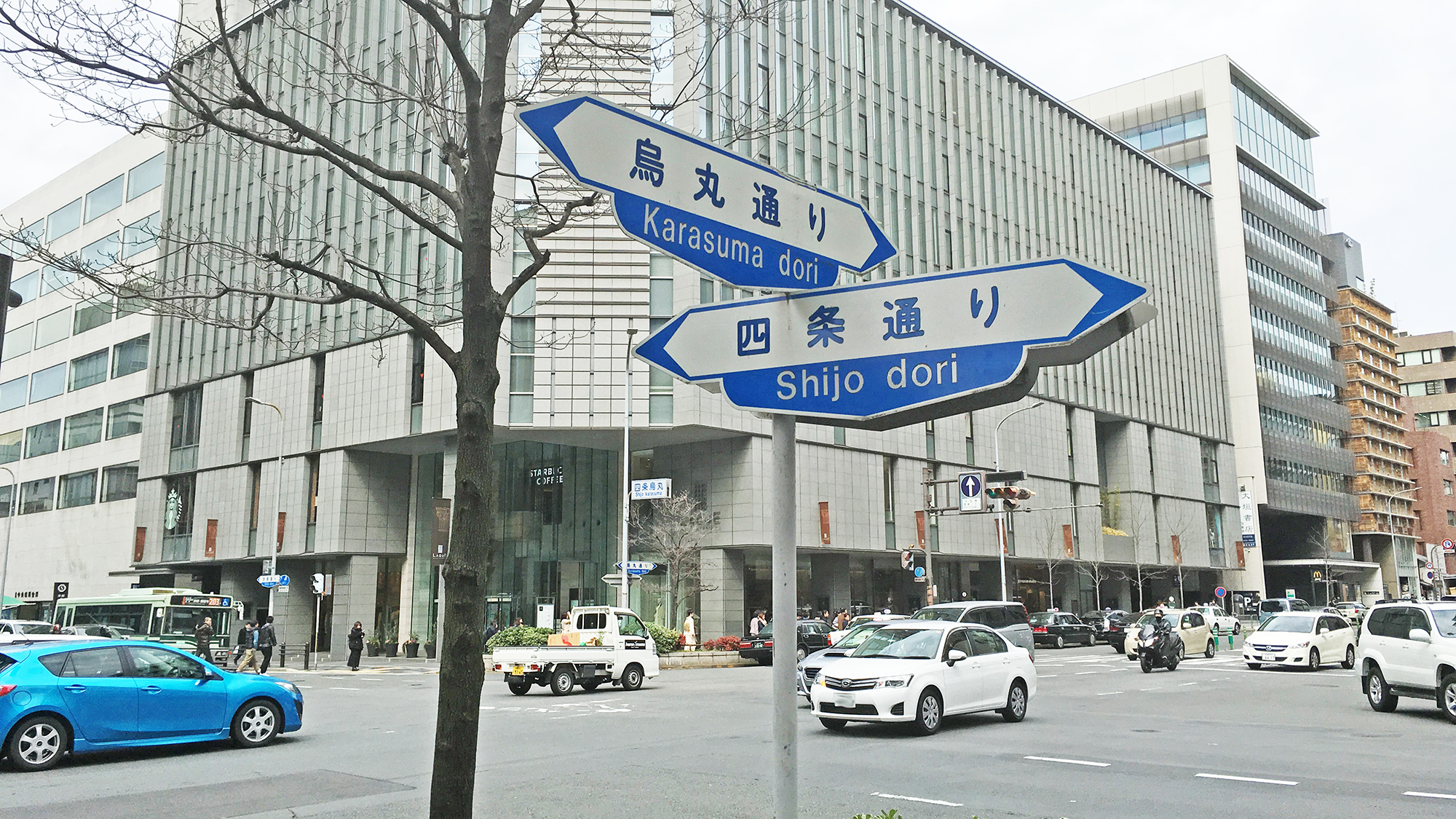
Shijō St & Karasuma St

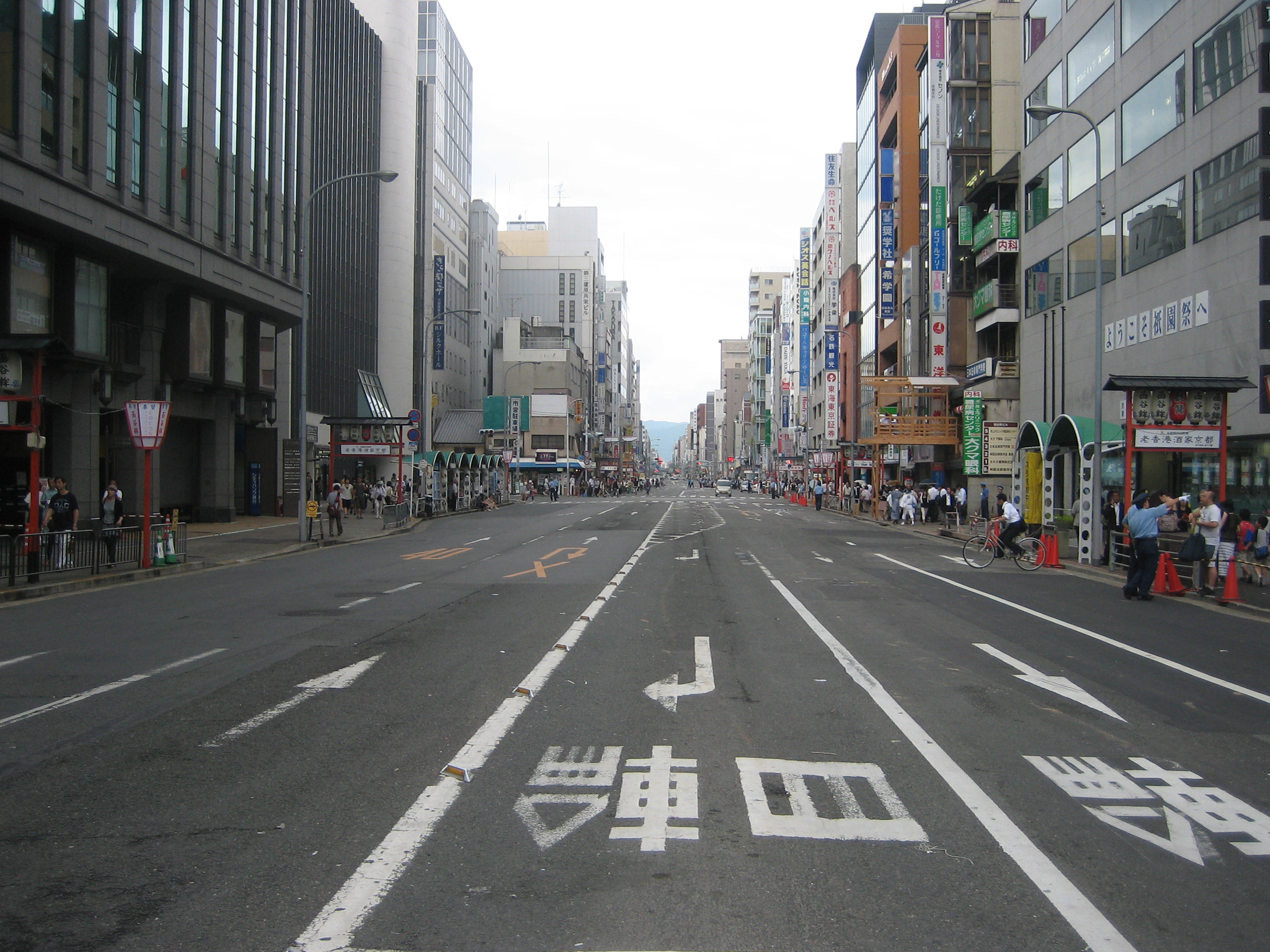
View from the Shijō Karasuma intersection

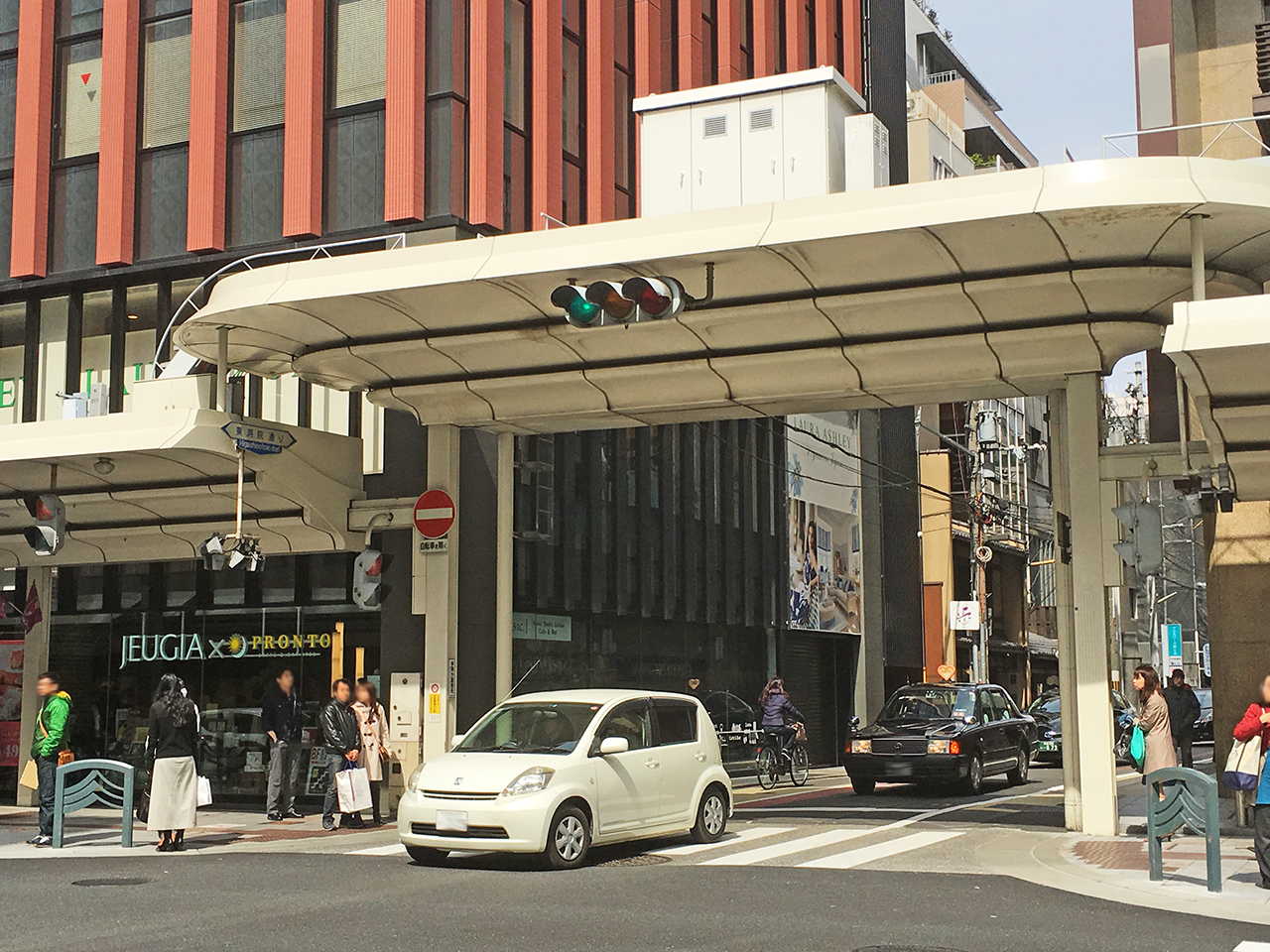
Shijō St & Higashino-toin St

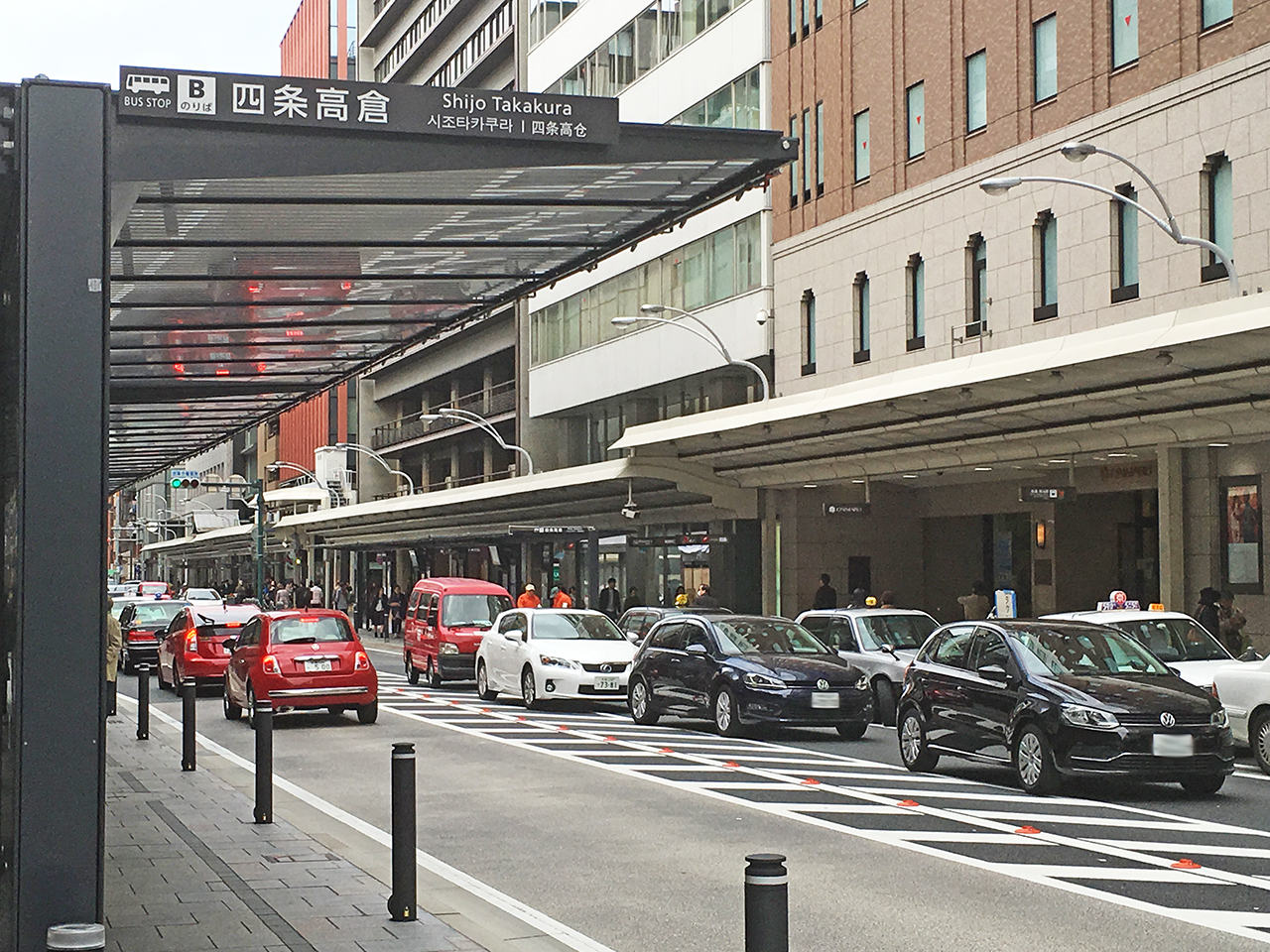
Shijō-Takakura Bus Stop

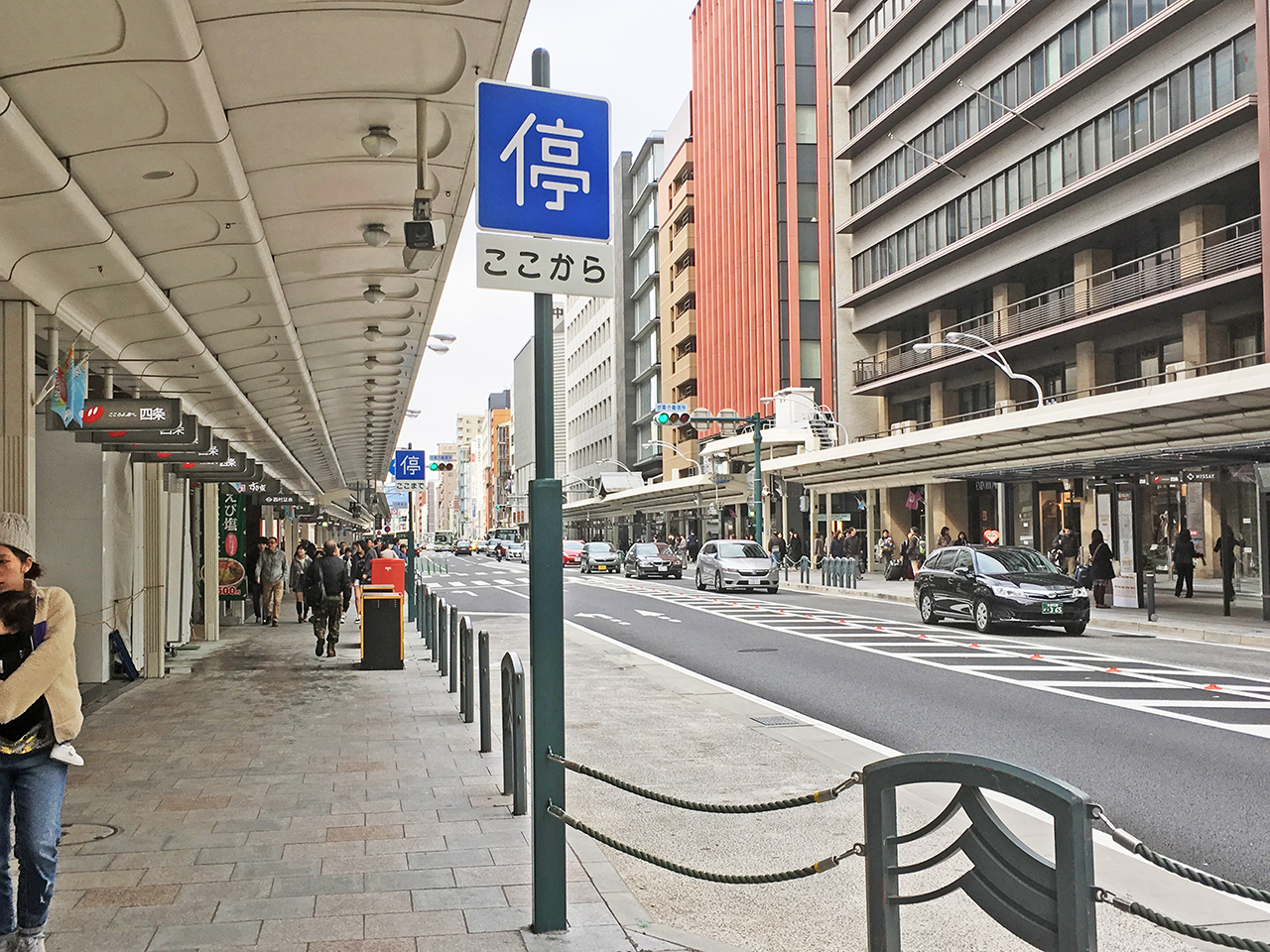
Roadside parking is allowed only at designated places as signed.

== Public transport ==
The street is one of trunk routes of the city bus. Beneath the street are the tracks of the Hankyu Kyoto Line railway with the stations at Kawaramachi Street (Kawaramachi Station), Karasuma Street (Karasuma Station), Ōmiya Street (Ōmiya Station) and Nishiōji Street (Saiin Station). The Keihan Main Line (Gion-Shijō Station), the Karasuma Line subway (Shijō Station), the Keifuku Arashiyama Main Line (Shijo-Omiya Station and Sai Station), the Sanin Main Line (no nearby station) and the Hankyu Arashiyama Line (Matsuo-taisha Station) are the railways crossing the street.

The Shijō Line of Kyoto City Tram operated on the street (between Gion and Shijō Ōmiya) from 1912 to 1972. The extension of the tram westward from Shijō Ōmiya was built as a trolleybus line to Nishiōji Shijō in 1932, to Umezu in 1958 (replacing existing Umezu Line tram) and to Matsuobashi in 1962. The trolleybus was discontinued in 1969.
