= Kuinabashi Station =

Metro station in Kyoto, Japan

Coordinates: 34.9627°N 135.7574°E

K14 Kuinabashi Station くいな橋駅
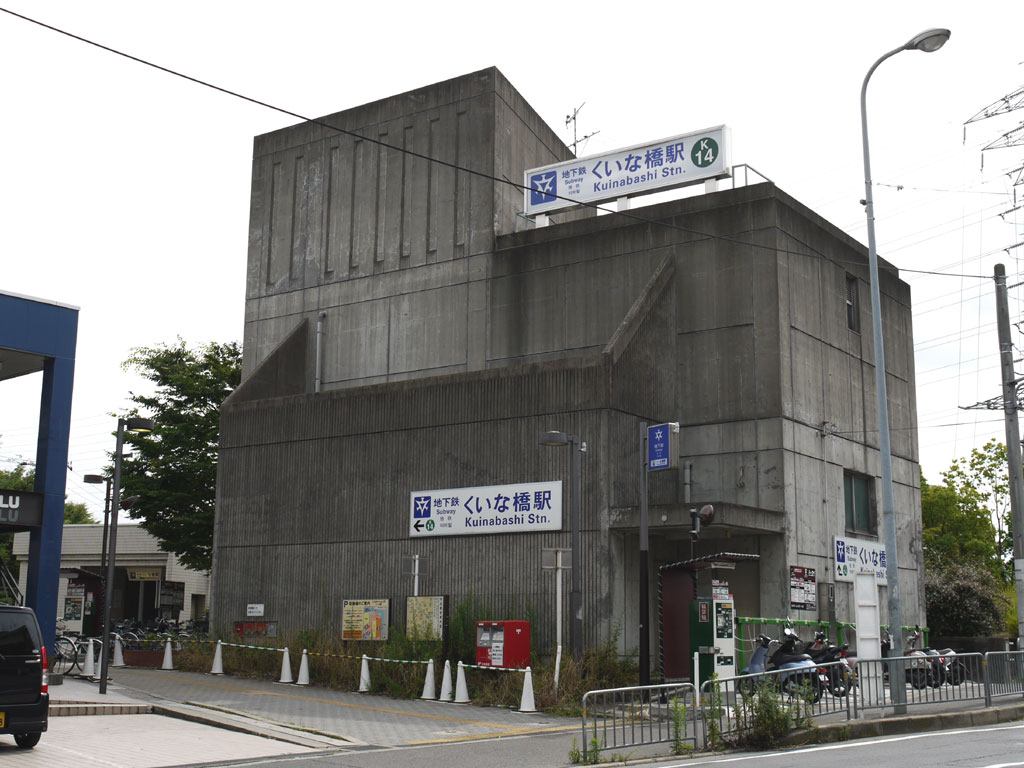
- Station building

General information
- Location: Fushimi, Kyoto, Kyoto; Japan
- Operator: Kyoto Municipal Subway
- Line: Karasuma Line
- Platforms: 1 island platform
- Tracks: 2

Other information
- Station code: K14

History
- Opened: June 11, 1988; 38 years ago

Passengers
- FY2016: 5,711 daily

Services
Preceding station	Kyoto Municipal Subway	Following station
Takeda K15 Terminus	Karasuma Line	Jūjō K13 towards Kokusaikaikan
Location

Kuinabashi Station (くいな橋駅, Kuinabashi-eki) is a train station on the Kyoto Municipal Subway Karasuma Line in Fushimi-ku, Kyoto, Japan.

== Lines ==
- Kyoto Municipal Subway
  - Karasuma Line (Station Number: K14)

== Layout ==
The station has one island platform serving two tracks. Track No. 1 for trains bound for Takeda and Kintetsu Kyoto Line and Track No. 2 is for trains bound for Kokusai-Kaikan.

== History ==
The station opened on June 11, 1988.
