= Imadegawa Station =

Metro station in Kyoto, Japan

K06 Imadegawa Station 今出川駅
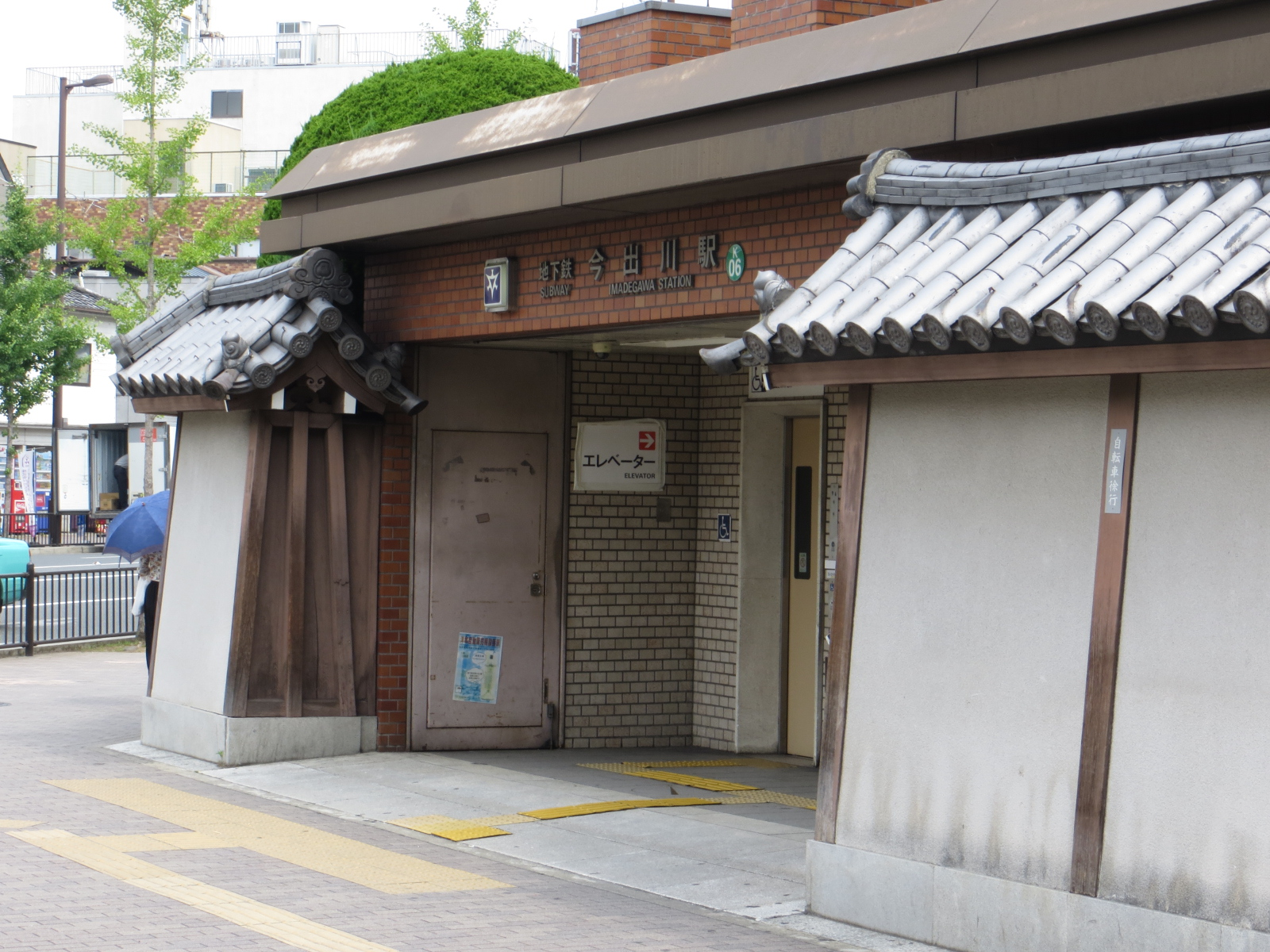

General information
- Location: Kamigyō-ku, Kyoto; Japan
- Coordinates: 35.0301°N 135.7593°E
- Operator: Kyoto Municipal Subway
- Line: Karasuma Line
- Platforms: 1
- Tracks: 2
- Connections: Bus stop

Other information
- Station code: K06

History
- Opened: 29 May 1981; 45 years ago

Passengers
- FY2016: 27,675 daily

Services
| Preceding station | Kyoto Municipal Subway | Following station |
|---|---|---|
| Marutamachi K07 towards Takeda | Karasuma Line | Kuramaguchi K05 towards Kokusaikaikan |
Location

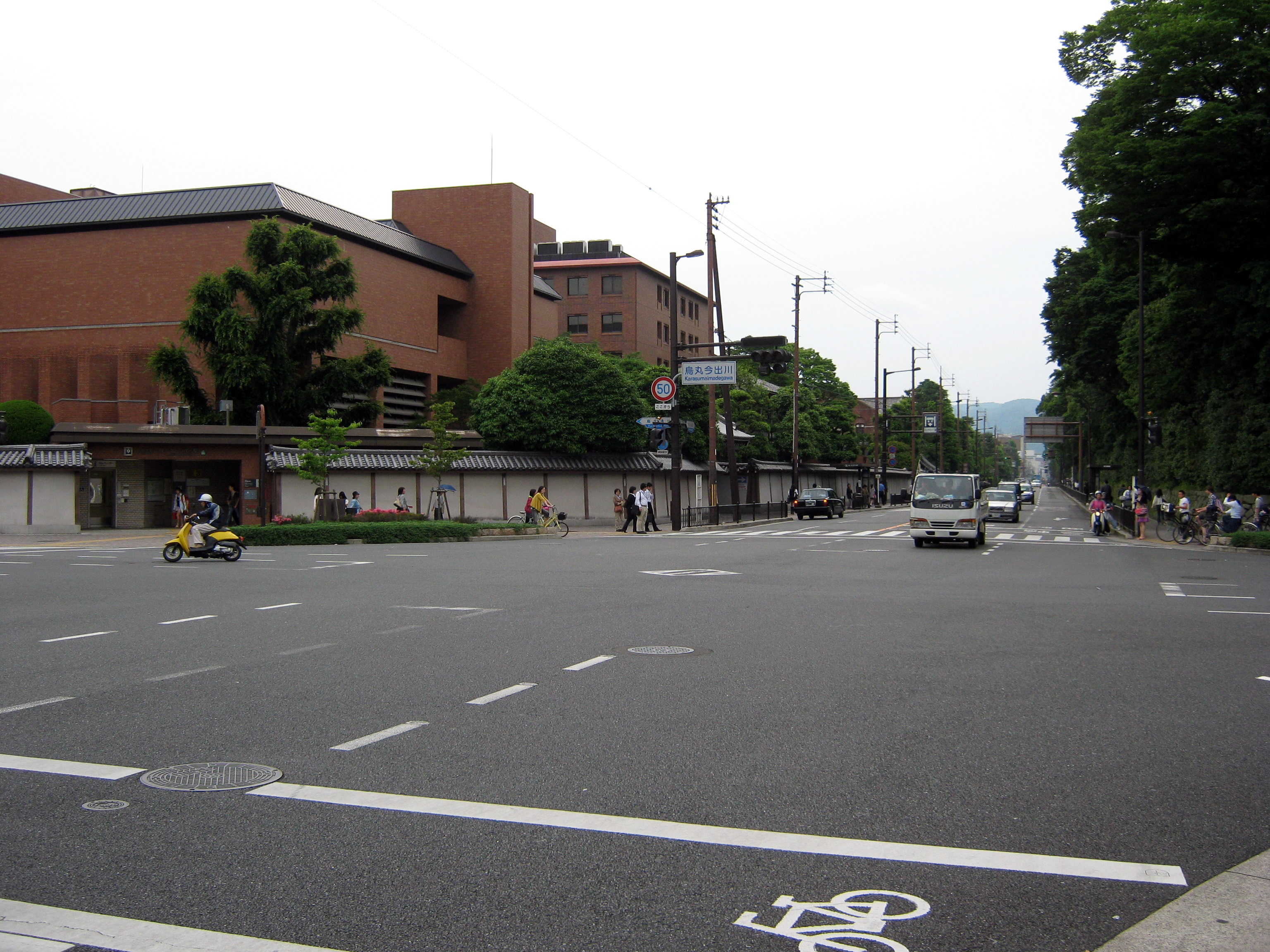
Karasuma Imadegawa intersection and station entrance

Imadegawa Station (今出川駅, Imadegawa-eki) is a train station on the Kyoto Municipal Subway Karasuma Line in Kamigyo-ku, Kyoto, Japan. It is the closest station to the Kyoto Imperial Palace.

== Lines ==
- Kyoto Municipal Subway
  - Karasuma Line (Station Number: K06)

== Layout ==
The station consists of one underground island platform serving two tracks.

| 1 | ■Karasuma Line | To Shijo, Kyoto, Takeda and Nara |
| 2 | ■Karasuma Line | To Kitaōji and Kokusaikaikan |

== Surrounding area ==
Around the station is the Kyoto Imperial Palace. The Imadegawa campus of Doshisha University is located nearby the station.
