= Karasuma Line =

Subway line in Kyoto, Japan

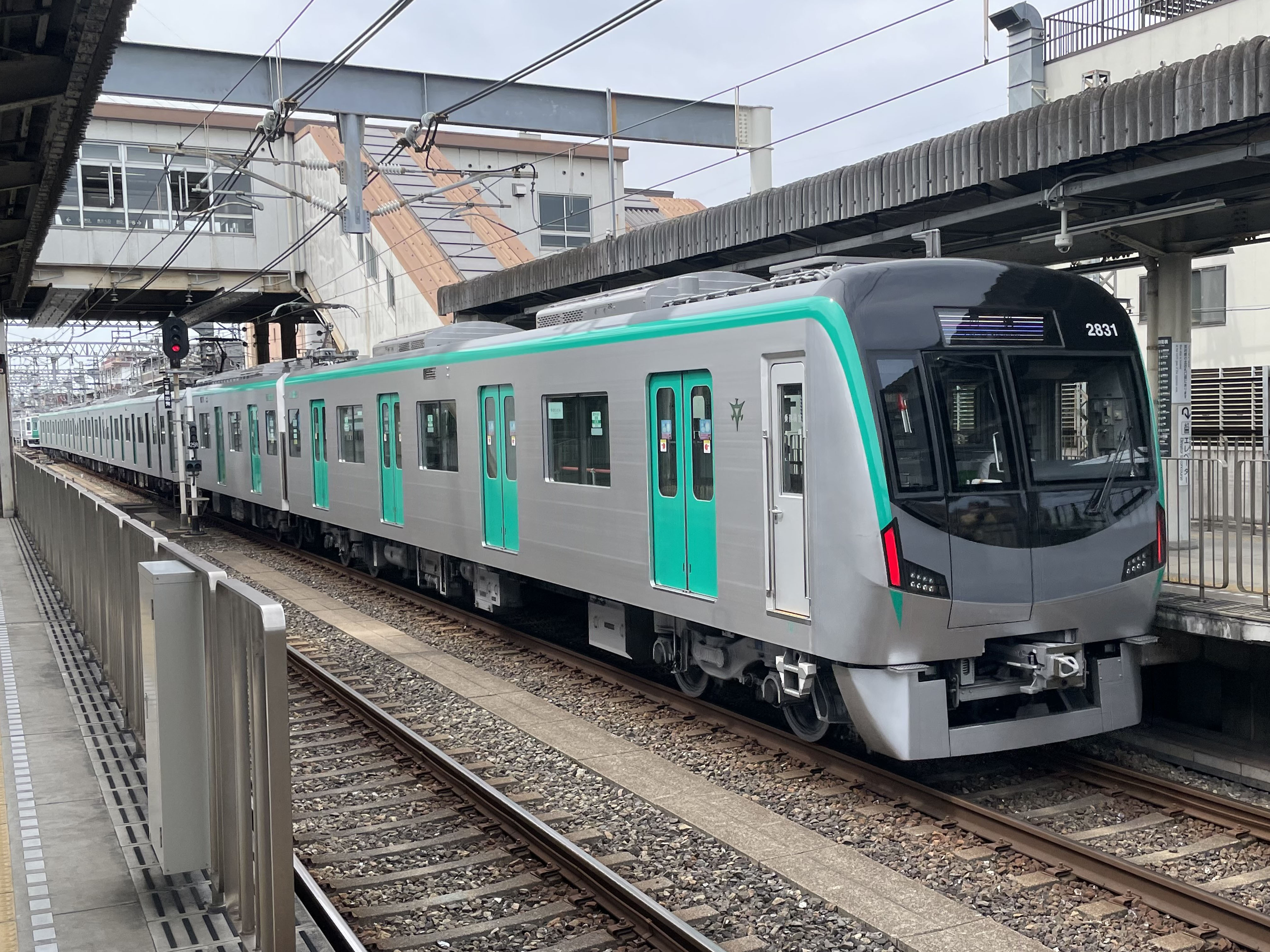
- Kyoto subway 20 series unit 31 at Takeda station

Overview
- Native name: 烏丸線
- Locale: Kyoto
- Termini: Kokusaikaikan; Takeda
- Stations: 15
- Website: http://www.city.kyoto.lg.jp/kotsu/

Service
- Type: Rapid transit
- System: Kyoto Municipal Subway
- Operator: Kyoto Municipal Transportation Bureau
- Depot: Takeda
- Rolling stock: 10 series, 20 series EMUs

History
- Opened: 29 May 1981; 45 years ago
- Last extension: 1997

Technical
- Line length: 13.7 km (8.5 mi)
- Track gauge: 1,435 mm (4 ft 8 1/2 in) standard gauge
- Electrification: Overhead line, 1,500 V DC
- Operating speed: 75 km/h (47 mph)

The Karasuma Line (Japanese: 烏丸線, Hepburn: Karasuma-sen) is one of the two lines of the Kyoto Municipal Subway operated by Kyoto Municipal Transportation Bureau in Kyoto, Japan. On maps, diagrams and signboards, the line is colored green, and its stations are given numbers following the letter "K". It serves seven of Kyoto's eleven wards: Sakyō-ku, Kita-ku, Kamigyō-ku, Nakagyō-ku, Shimogyō-ku, Minami-ku, and Fushimi-ku. It connects Kokusaikaikan in Sakyō-ku and Takeda in Fushimi-ku.

Between Kitaōji and Jūjō, trains run beneath the north–south Karasuma Street, hence the name. They link to the other subway line, the Tozai Line, at Karasuma Oike. They also connect to the JR lines at Kyoto Station and the Hankyu Kyoto Line running beneath Shijō Street at the intersection of Shijō Karasuma, Kyoto's central business district. At Shijō Karasuma, the subway station is named Shijō, whereas Hankyu's station is called Karasuma.

The Transportation Bureau and Kintetsu Railway jointly operate through services, which connect the Karasuma Line with the Kintetsu Kyoto Line to Kintetsu Nara Station in Nara. The Karasuma Line and the Kyoto Line connect at Kyoto and Takeda.

This line covers a total distance of 13.7 kilometres (8.5 mi) in 26 minutes and the average daily ridership in 2009 was 411,881 passengers.

== Stations ==
No.	Station	Distance in km (mi)	Transfers	Location
K01	Kokusaikaikan 国際会館	0 (0)		Sakyo-ku, Kyoto
K02	Matsugasaki 松ヶ崎	1.6 (0.99)		Sakyo-ku, Kyoto
K03	Kitayama 北山	2.6 (1.6)		Kita-ku, Kyoto
K04	Kitaōji 北大路	3.8 (2.4)		Kita-ku, Kyoto
K05	Kuramaguchi 鞍馬口	4.6 (2.9)		Kamigyo-ku, Kyoto
K06	Imadegawa 今出川	5.4 (3.4)		Kamigyo-ku, Kyoto
K07	Marutamachi 丸太町	6.9 (4.3)		Nakagyo-ku, Kyoto
K08	Karasuma Oike 烏丸御池	7.6 (4.7)	Tōzai Line (T13)	Nakagyo-ku, Kyoto
K09	Shijō 四条	8.5 (5.3)	Hankyu Kyoto Line (HK-85: Karasuma Station)	Shimogyo-ku, Kyoto
K10	Gojō 五条	9.3 (5.8)		Shimogyo-ku, Kyoto
K11	Kyoto 京都	10.3 (6.4)	Tokaido Shinkansen; A Tokaido Main Line (JR Kyoto Line, Biwako Line) (JR-A31); E San'in Main Line (Sagano Line) (JR-E01); D Nara Line (JR-D01); B Kyoto Line (B01)	Shimogyo-ku, Kyoto
K12	Kujō 九条	11.1 (6.9)		Minami-ku, Kyoto
K13	Jūjō 十条	11.8 (7.3)		Minami-ku, Kyoto
K14	Kuinabashi くいな橋	13.0 (8.1)		Fushimi-ku, Kyoto
K15	Takeda 竹田	13.7 (8.5)	B Kyoto Line (B05, through service)	Fushimi-ku, Kyoto
↓ Through-running to/from Kintetsu Nara via the Kintetsu Kyoto Line ↓

== Rolling stock ==
=== Kyoto Municipal Transportation Bureau ===
- 10 series
- 20 series
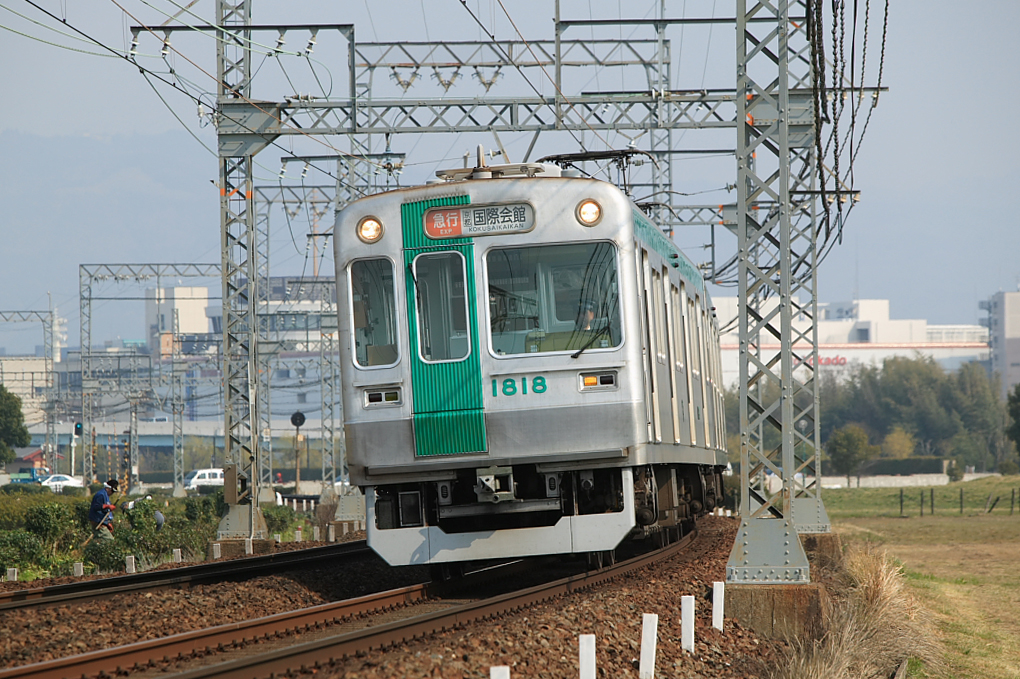
A 10 series (6th batch) EMU on an express service bound for Kokusaikaikan

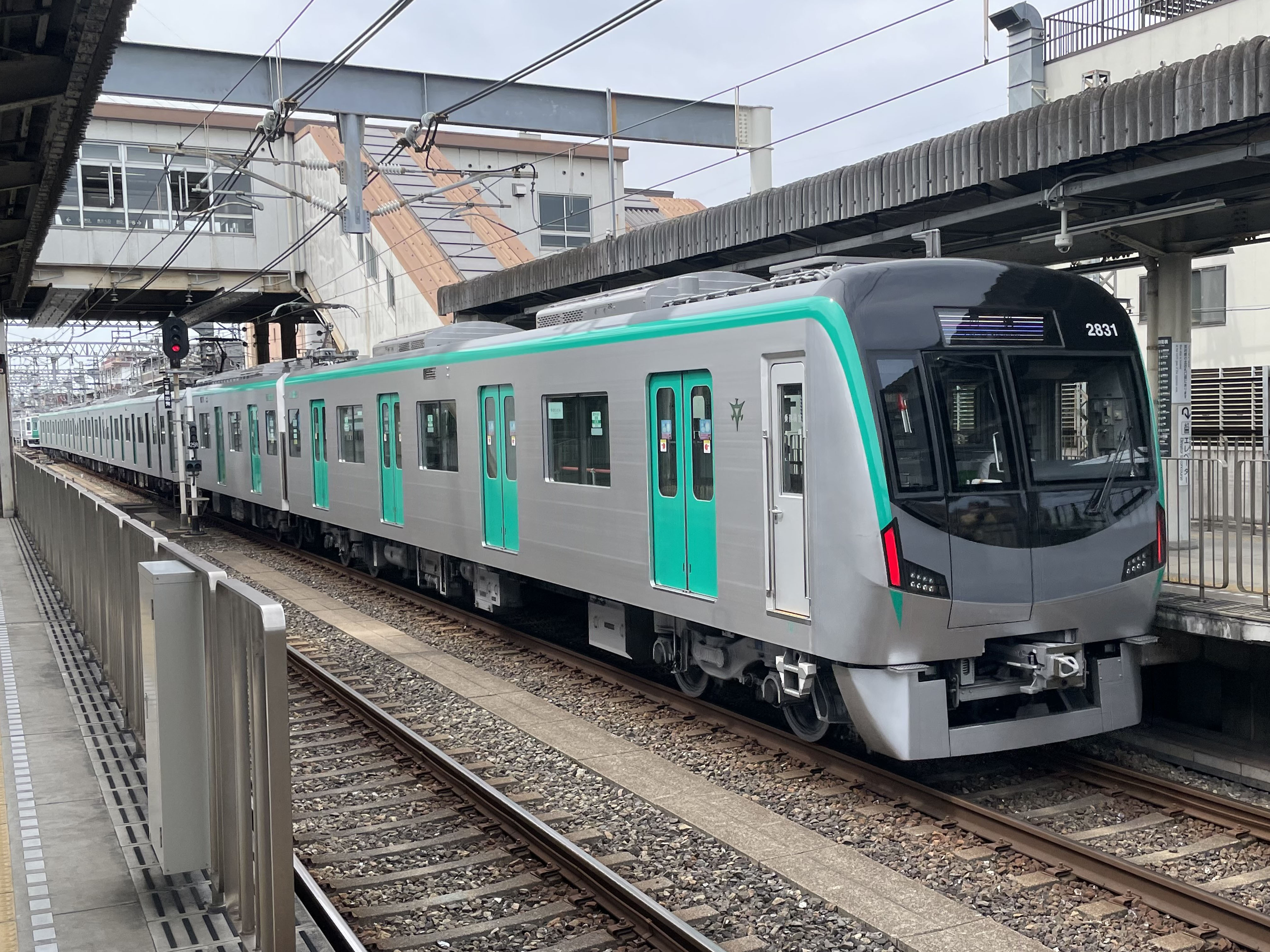
Kyoto subway 20 series unit 31 at Takeda station

=== Kintetsu Railway ===
- Kintetsu 3200 series
- Kintetsu 3220 series
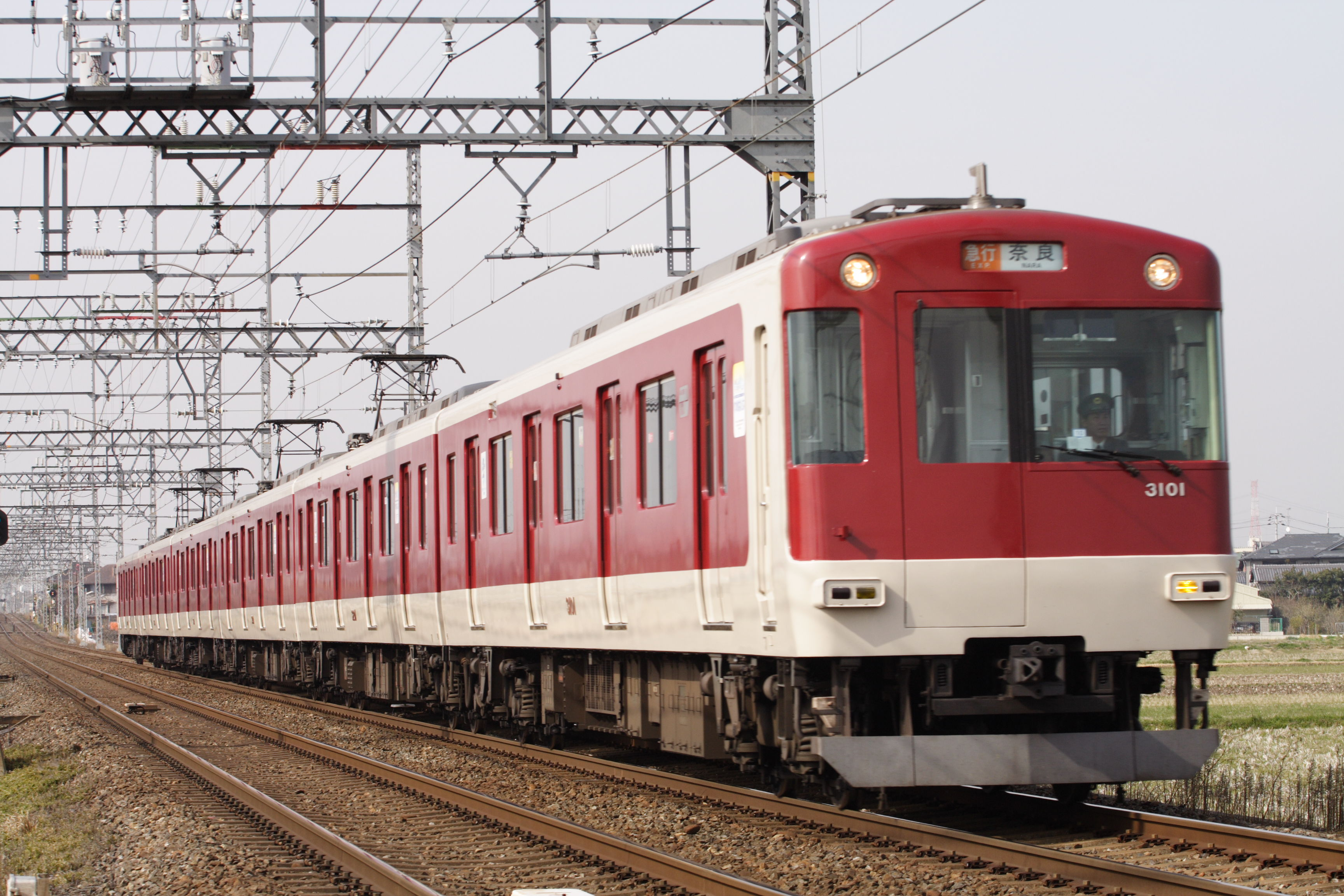
Kintetsu 3200 series train

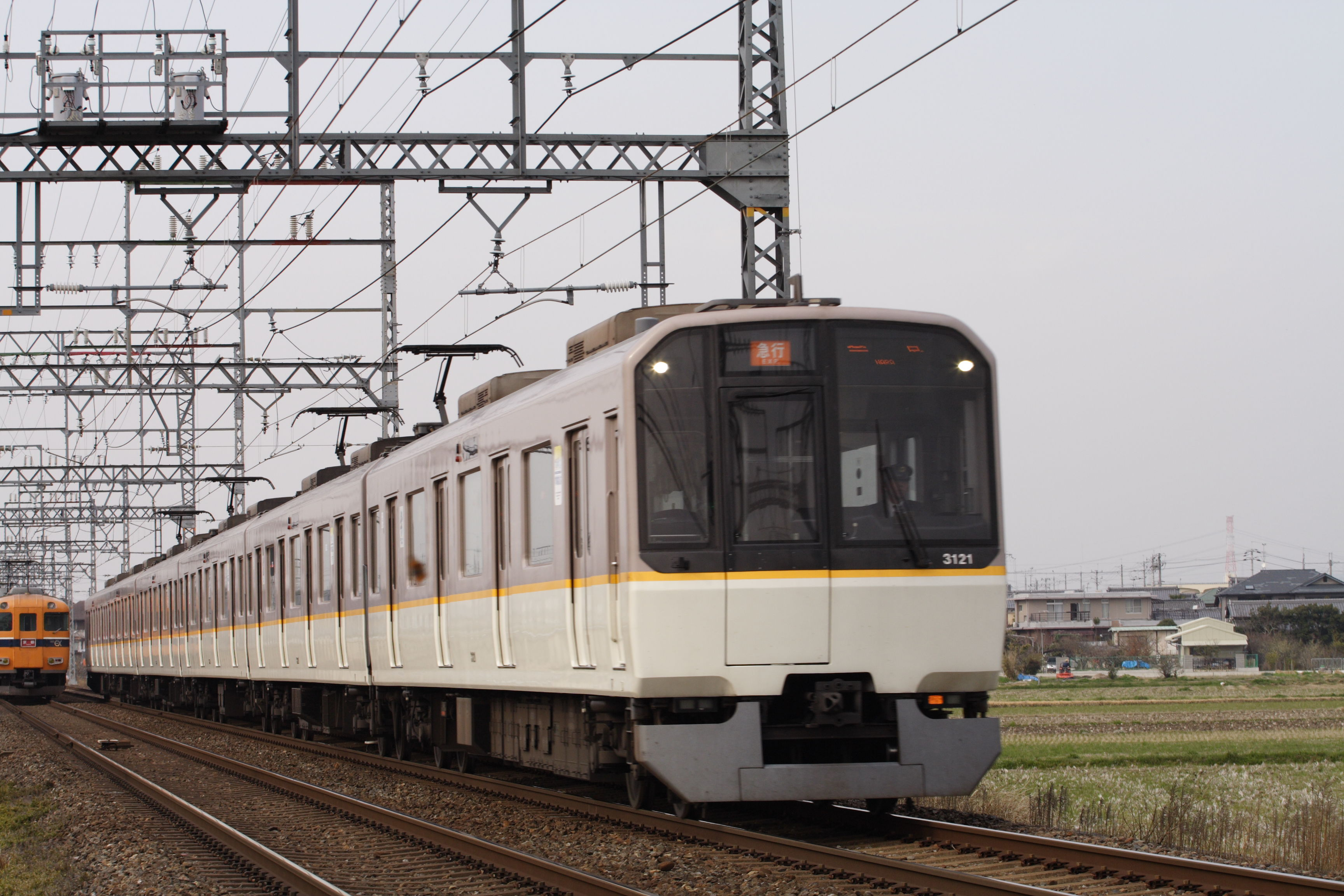
Kintetsu 3220 series train

== History ==
Average daily passenger numbers
Year	Number of passengers
2009	205,994
2010	209,615
2011	212,400
2012	215,865
2013	223,517
2014	258,604
2015	266,432
2016	271,104
2017	274,950
2018	282,105
2019	284,840
2020	182,341
2021	204,164
2022	246,008
2023	277,081
2024	289,134

The section between Kitaōji and Kyoto was completed on May 29, 1981. The line was extended from Kyoto to Takeda on June 11, 1988. Through services from Kitaōji to Shin-Tanabe on the Kyoto Line started on August 28, 1988. The line was extended from Kitaōji to Kitayama on October 24, 1990. Oike Station was renamed Karasuma Oike Station on May 22, 1997, prior to the inauguration of the Tōzai Line running beneath the east–west Oike Street (御池通, Oike-dōri). The line was extended from Kitayama to Kokusaikaikan on June 3, 1997. Express services from Kokusaikaikan to Kintetsu Nara in Nara started on March 15, 2000.

== Bibliography ==
- This article was translated from the corresponding article in the Japanese Wikipedia, retrieved on July 4, 2009.
