= Nakagyō-ku =

Nakagyō 中京区
- Ward of Kyoto
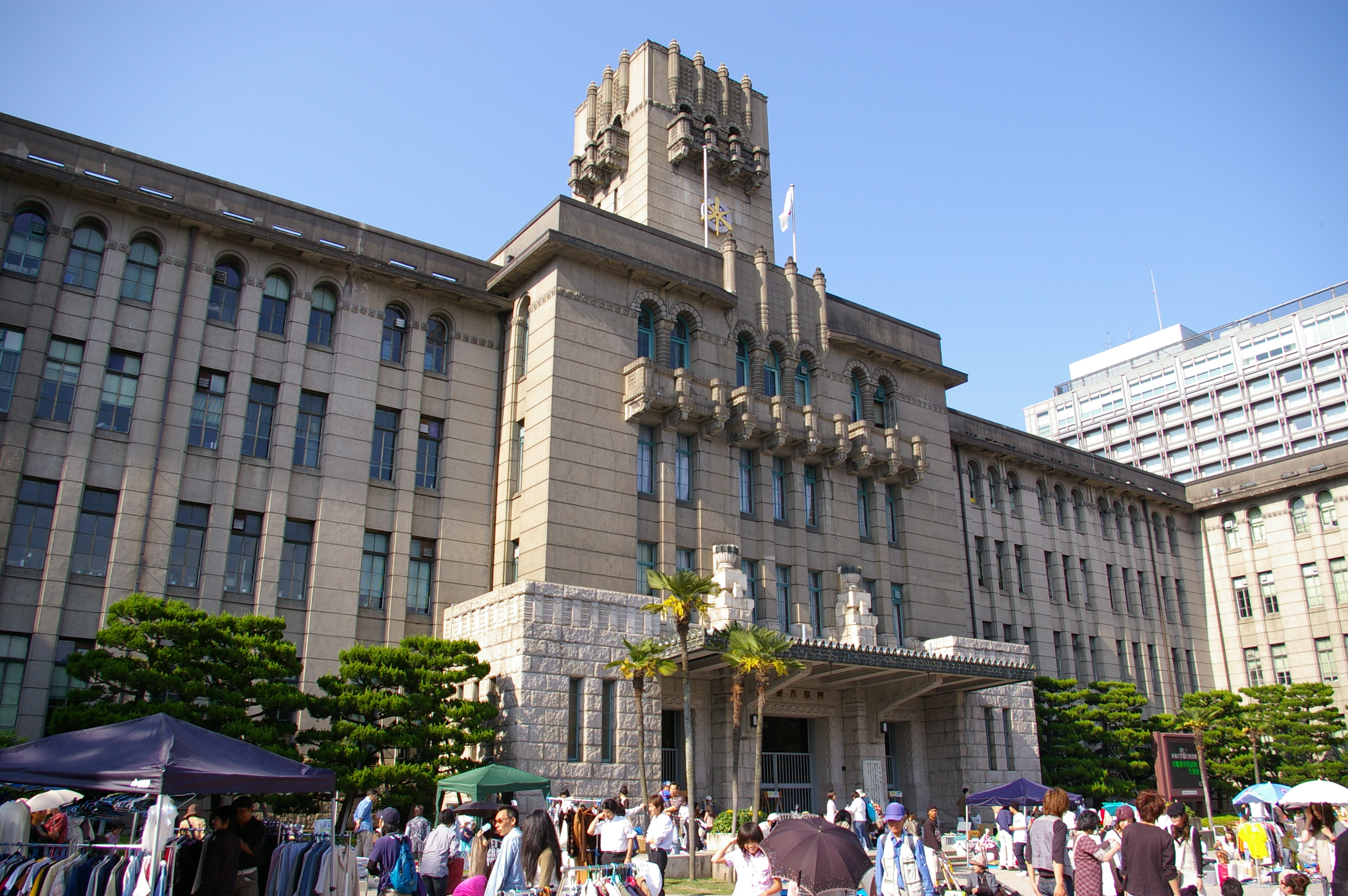
- Kyoto city hall

- Location of Nakagyō-ku in Kyoto

- Location of Nakagyō-ku in Japan
- Coordinates: 35°0′36″N 135°45′5″E
- Country: Japan
- Prefecture: Kyoto
- City: Kyoto
- Founded: 1929

Area
  - Total: 7.41 km^{2} (2.86 sq mi)
- Highest elevation: 77 m (253 ft)
- Lowest elevation: 46 m (151 ft)

Population (October 1, 2020)
  - Total: 110,488
  - Estimate (2021): 109,629
  - Density: 14,900/km^{2} (38,600/sq mi)
- Time zone: UTC+9 (Japan Standard Time)
- Website: www.city.kyoto.lg.jp/nakagyo/

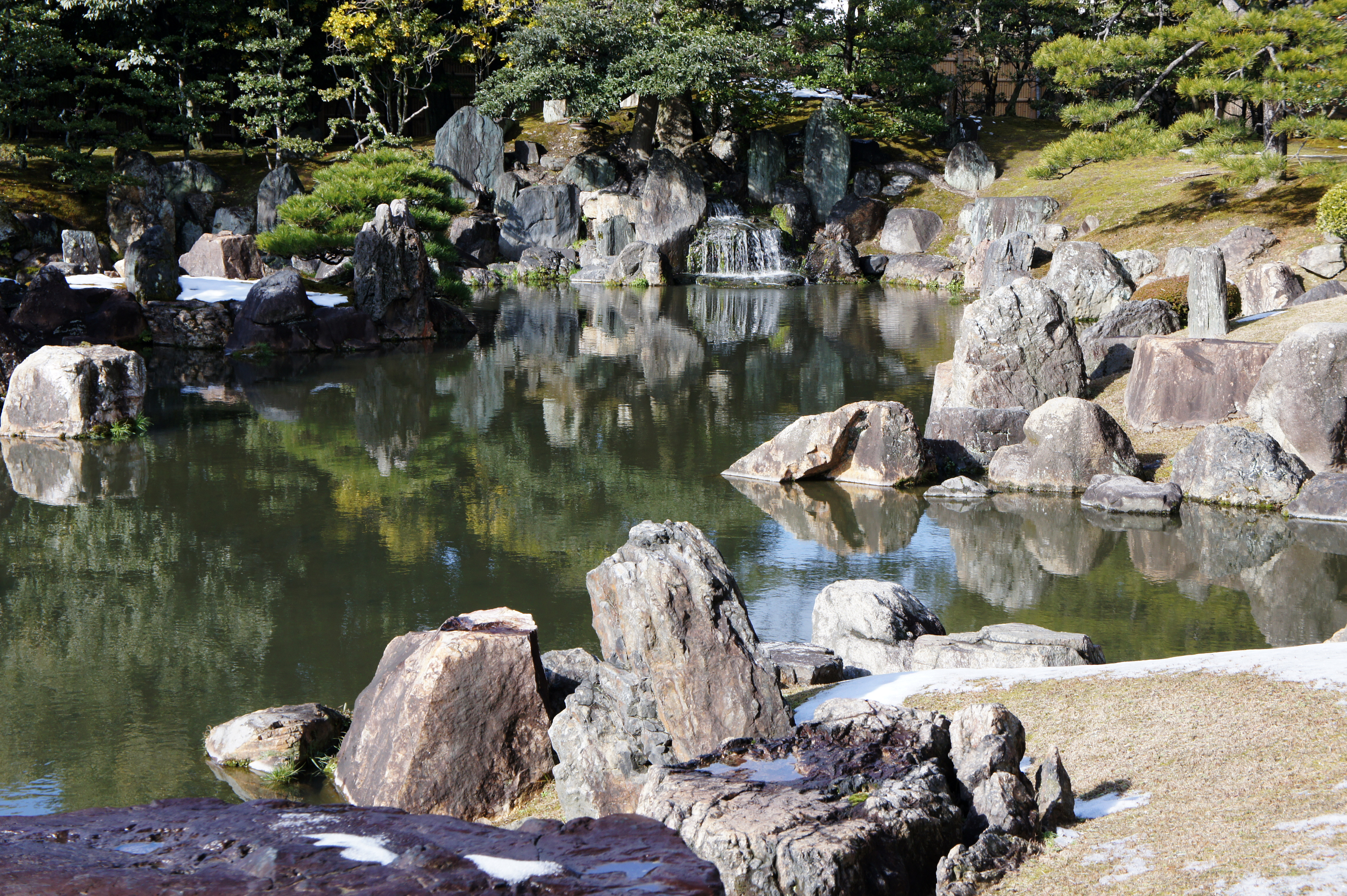
Nijō Castle in Nakagyō-ku is famous for architecture and gardens.

Nakagyō-ku (中京区) is one of the eleven wards in the city of Kyoto, in Kyoto Prefecture, Japan. Its name means "central capital ward."

As of 2021, the ward has an estimated population of 109,629 people. Tourism, shopping, and entertainment are the primary sources of income in the area. The Kamo River flows through the district in the area known as Kawaramachi. The three most famous festivals of Kyoto, the Aoi Matsuri, the Gion Matsuri, and the Jidai Matsuri can all be seen in Nakagyō-ku. It is also home to several historical places and temples.

== Demographics ==
Historical population
Year	Pop.	±%
1930	163,890	—
1940	172,824	+5.5%
1950	155,522	−10.0%
1960	163,572	+5.2%
1970	130,482	−20.2%
1980	105,921	−18.8%
1990	94,676	−10.6%
2000	95,038	+0.4%
2010	105,306	+10.8%
2020	110,488	+4.9%

== Temples and landmarks ==
- Kyoto International Manga Museum
- Kyoto Art Center
- Museum of Kyoto
- Nijō Castle a former residence for the Tokugawa Shogunate
- Nishiki Market

== Economy ==
The ward is home to the headquarters of several companies:

- Hatena, in Karasuma-dori Rokkaku-sagaru
- Keifuku Electric Railroad, in Shijō-Ōmiya Nishi-Iru
- Nichicon, in Karasuma-dori Oike-agaru
- Q-Games
- Shimadzu, in Nishinokyo-Kuwabara-cho

== Education ==
=== Colleges and universities ===
- Hanazono University
- Kyoto College of Nursing
- Suzaku campus, Ritsumeikan University
- Nijo campus, Bukkyo University
