= Karasuma Station =

Railway station in Kyoto, Japan

Karasuma Station 烏丸駅
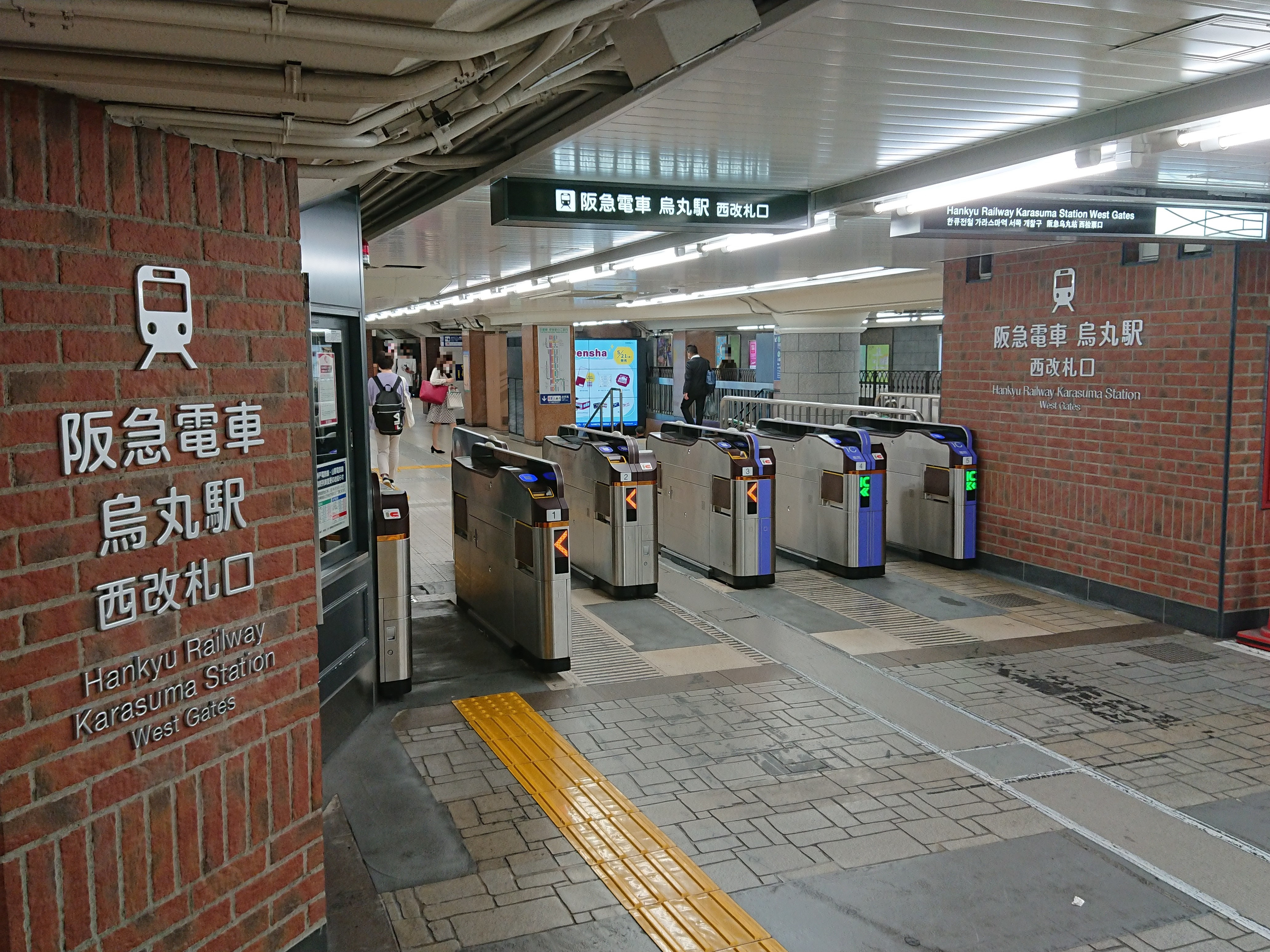
- West ticket gate

General information
- Location: Shijō-dōri Karasuma Higashi-iru Naginatabokochō, Shimogyō, Kyoto, Kyoto （京都市下京区四条通烏丸東入ル長刀鉾町） Japan
- Coordinates: 35°0′13″N 135°45′37″E
- Operator: Hankyu Corporation
- Line: Hankyu Kyoto Main Line
- Platforms: 1 island platform
- Tracks: 2
- Connections: Shijō Station (Kyoto Municipal Subway); Bus stop

Other information
- Station code: HK-85
- Website: Official

History
- Opened: 17 June 1963

Passengers
- 2025: 80,522 daily
Location

Karasuma Station (烏丸駅, Karasuma-eki) is a station on the Hankyu Kyoto Line.

== Layout ==
The station has an island platform serving two tracks.

1	■ Kyoto Line	to Kyoto-kawaramachi
2	■ Kyoto Line	for Osaka (Osaka-umeda, Tengachaya), Kita-Senri, Kobe, Takarazuka

Shijō Station on the Karasuma Line subway is connected with Karasuma Station by a short underground walkway.

== Usage ==
In fiscal 2015 (April 2015 to March 2016), about 33,933,000 passengers used this station annually. For historical data, see the table below.

Year	Number (in thousands)	
Year	Boarding	Total
2001	14,862	30,878
2002	14,562	30,457
2003	14,442	29,972
2004	14,133	29,496
2005	15,338	31,240
2006	15,045	30,943
2007	15,667	31,916
2008	15,753	32,630
2009	14,219	30,217
2010	14,758	30,472
2011	14,881	31,126
2012	15,241	31,600
2015	16,391	33,933

== History ==
Karasuma Station opened on 17 June 1963.

Station numbering was introduced to all Hankyu stations on 21 December 2013 with this station being designated as station number HK-85.

== Adjacent stations ==
«	Service	»
Kyoto Main Line (HK-85)
Ōmiya	Local	Kyoto-kawaramachi
Ōmiya	Semi-Express	Kyoto-kawaramachi
Ōmiya	Express	Kyoto-kawaramachi
Ōmiya	Semi Limited Express	Kyoto-kawaramachi
Katsura	Limited Express	Kyoto-kawaramachi
Ōmiya	Commuter Limited Express	Kyoto-kawaramachi
Katsura	Rapid Limited Express "Kyo-Train", "Ogura"	Kyoto-kawaramachi
