= Shijō Station =

Metro station in Kyoto, Japan

K09 Shijō Station 四条駅
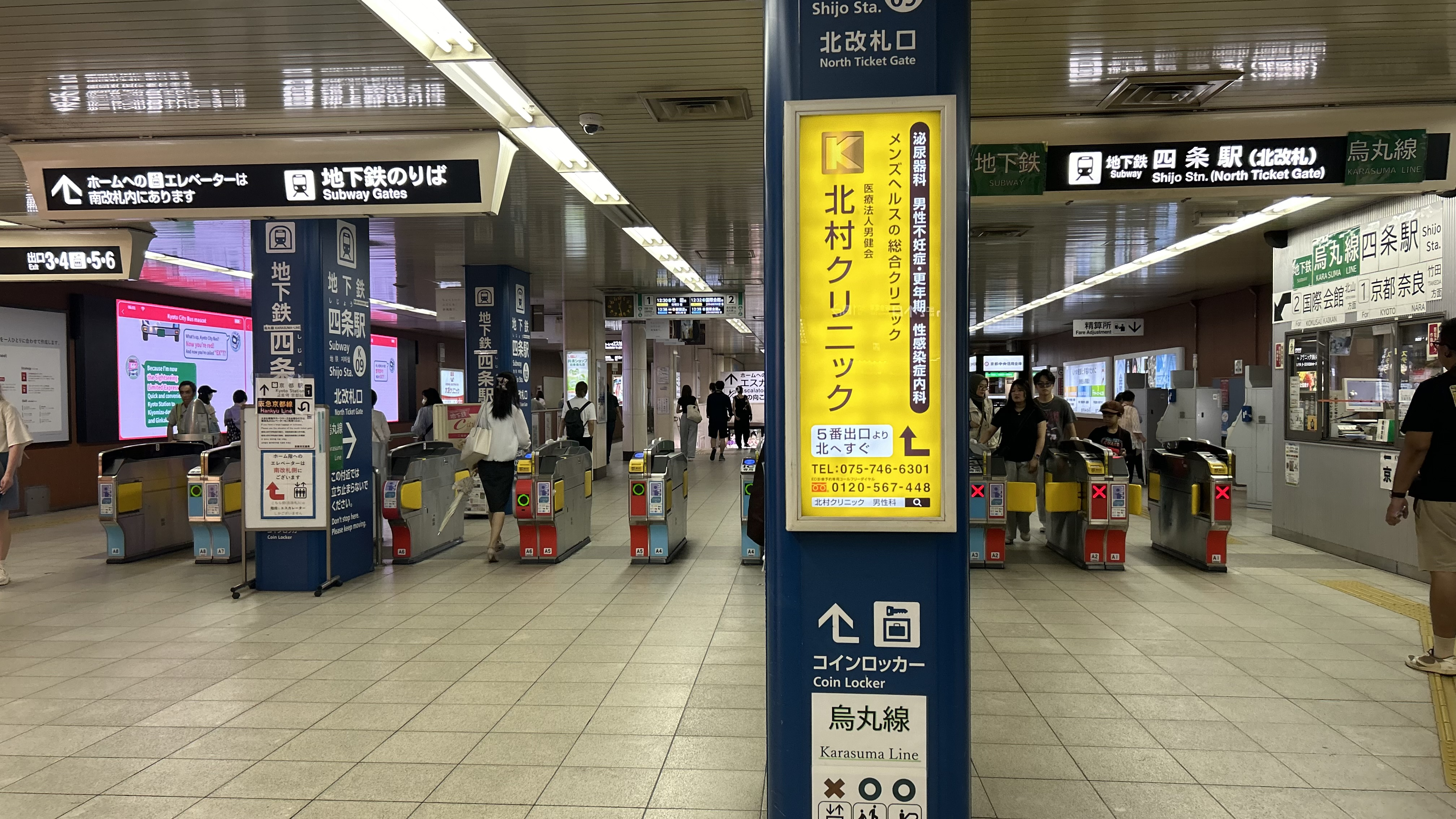

General information
- Location: Shimogyō-ku, Kyoto; Japan
- Coordinates: 35°0′9″N 135°45′35″E
- Operator: Kyoto Municipal Subway
- Line: Karasuma Line
- Distance: 2.2 km (1.4 mi) from Kyōto
- Platforms: 1 island platform
- Tracks: 2
- Connections: Karasuma Station (Hankyu Kyoto Main Line)

Construction
- Structure type: Underground

Other information
- Station code: K09
- Website: Official (in Japanese)

History
- Opened: 29 May 1981

Passengers
- 2025: 107,770 daily

Services
Preceding station	Kyoto Municipal Subway	Following station
Gojō K10 towards Takeda	Karasuma Line	Karasuma Oike K08 towards Kokusaikaikan
Location

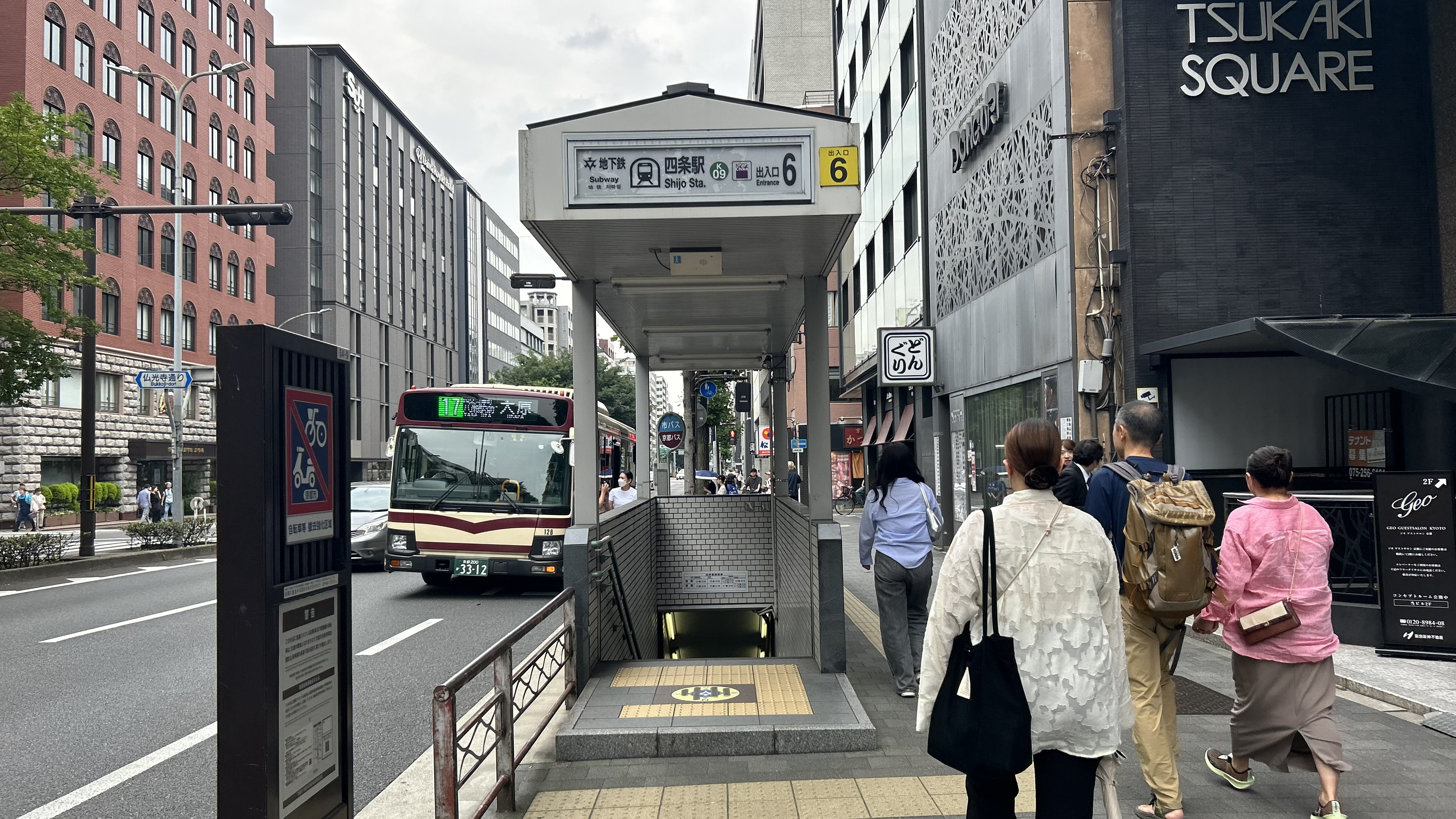
Exit No. 6 at Karasuma-Bukkōji intersection

Shijō Station (四条駅, Shijō-eki) is a train station on the Kyoto Municipal Subway Karasuma Line in Shimogyo-ku, Kyoto, Japan.

The station is located beneath Karasuma Street, at the intersection with Shijō Street. The underground concourse of Shijō Station is connected to the underground concourse of Karasuma Station on the Hankyu Kyoto Line under Shijō Street.

== Lines ==
- Kyoto Municipal Subway
  - Karasuma Line (Station Number: K09)

== Layout ==
The station has an island platform serving two tracks.

1	■ Karasuma Line	for Kyoto, Takeda and Kintetsu Nara
2	■ Karasuma Line	for Karasuma Oike, Kitaoji and Kokusaikaikan
