= Karasuma Street =

Street in Kyoto, Japan

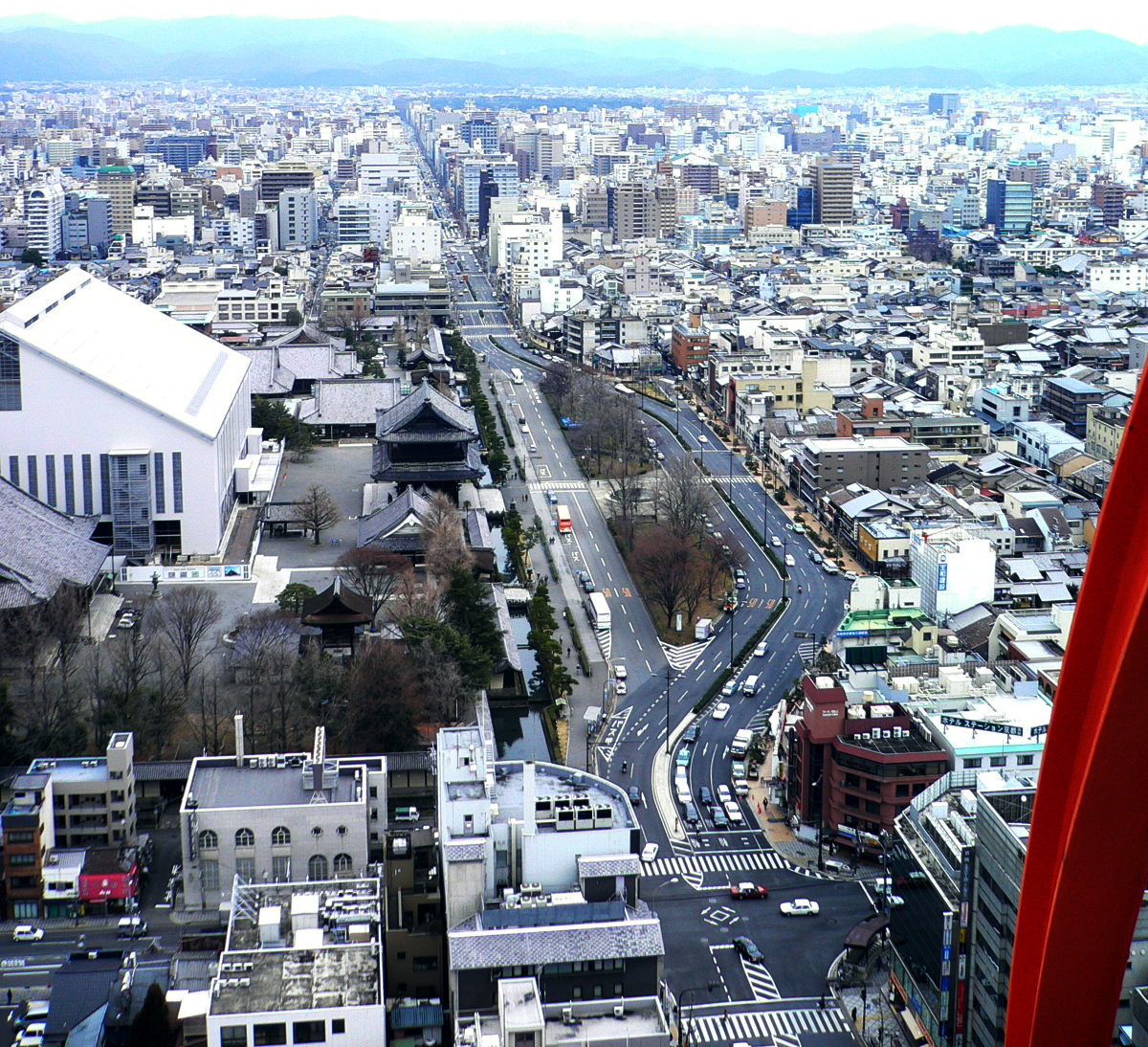
- Karasuma Street curves in front of Higashi Honganji.
- Native name: Japanese: 烏丸通り
- Type: Street
- Location: Kyoto

Karasuma Street (烏丸通り, Karasuma Dōri; litt. "crow circle street") is a major south-north street in central Kyoto, Japan. It is part of National Route 24 and National Route 367. The Karasuma Line subway runs under the street.
