= Kokusaikaikan Station =

Metro station in Kyoto, Japan

Coordinates: 35.0627°N 135.7854°E

K01 Kokusaikaikan Station 国際会館駅
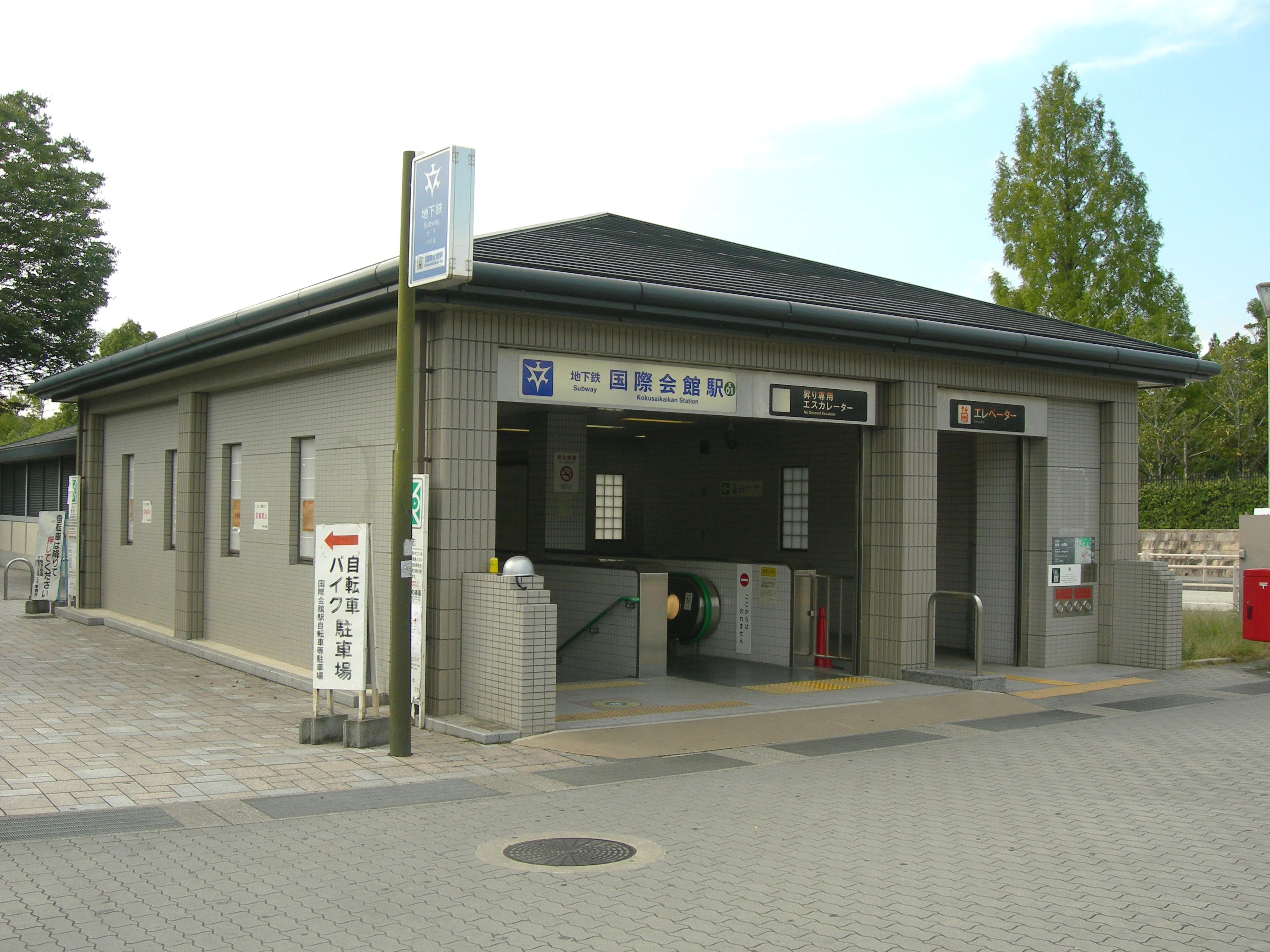
- Entrance No. 3 of the station

General information
- Location: Sakyō-ku, Kyoto; Japan
- Operator: Kyoto Municipal Subway
- Line: Karasuma Line
- Platforms: 2 (1 island platform)
- Tracks: 2

Other information
- Station code: K01

History
- Opened: 3 June 1997; 29 years ago

Passengers
- FY2016: 25,932 daily

Services
| Preceding station | Kyoto Municipal Subway | Following station |
|---|---|---|
| Matsugasaki K02 towards Takeda | Karasuma Line | Terminus |
Location

Kokusaikaikan Station (国際会館駅, Kokusai-Kaikan-eki; lit. 'International Conference Center') is a train station on the Kyoto Municipal Subway Karasuma Line in Sakyō-ku, Kyoto, Japan nearby the Kyoto International Conference Center. It is the beginning of the line, and was opened on 3 June 1997.

== Lines ==
- Kyoto Municipal Subway
  - Karasuma Line (Station Number: K01)

== Layout ==
The station has an island platform serving two tracks.

| 1, 2 | ■ Karasuma Line | for Shijo, Kyoto, Takeda and Kintetsu Nara |

| P Platforms | Platform 1 | Karasuma Line towards Shijo, Kyoto, Takeda and Kintetsu Nara → |
| P Platforms | Island platform, doors will open on the left |
| P Platforms | Platform 2 | Karasuma Line towards Shijo, Kyoto, Takeda and Kintetsu Nara → |

== Around the station ==
The station name "Kokusaikaikan" refers to the Kyoto International Conference Center (国立京都国際会館, Kokuritsu Kyōto Kokusai-kaikan), the city's main conference hall where many international conventions, including the conference that created the Kyoto Protocol in 1997, are held. The center can be accessed by short walk from the station.

- Kyoto International Conference Center
- Grand Prince Hotel Kyoto
- Iwakura Station (Eizan Railway Kurama Line)
- Entsu-ji
- Takaragaike-dori
- Doshisha Elementary School, Doshisha Junior and Senior High School

=== Bus stops ===
Kokusaikaikan-ekimae
- Kyoto City Bus: Bus stop A
  - Route 5 for Shijo Kawaramachi and Kyōto Station
  - Route 31 for Gion and Shijo Karasuma
  - Route 65 for Karasuma Marutamachi and Shijo Karasuma
- Kyoto City Bus: Bus stop B
  - Route 5, 31, 65 for Iwakura Depot
- Kyoto Bus Co., Ltd.: Bus stop 1
  - Route 24 for Iwakura Jisso-in
  - Route 26 for Iwakura Muramatsu (part of buses run via Iwakura Shimozaichicho)
  - Route 29 for Iwakura Muramatsu via Iwakura Shinozaichicho and Nagatani Hachimangu
  - Route 45, 46 for Iwakura Muramatsu
- Kyoto Bus Co., Ltd.: Bus stop 2
  - Route 40 for Kyoto Sangyo Daigaku-mae and Ichihara via Hokuryo Koko-mae, Kyoto Seika Daigaku-mae and Chikyuken-mae
  - Route 45 for Kyoto Station, Entsujimichi and Hakuaikai Byoin-mae
  - Route 46 for Kitaoji Station, Entsujimichi and Hakuaikai Byoin-mae
  - Route 50 for Ichihara via Hokuryo Koko-mae, Kyoto Seika Daigaku-mae and Chikyuken-mae
  - for Keihan Demachiyanagi Station via Hanazonobashi and Kawabata-dori (running only on weekdays)
  - for Takano Depot via Takaragaike Kyugijo-mae (running except weekdays)
- Kyoto Bus Co., Ltd.: Bus stop 3
  - Route 19 for Ohara and Kodeishi via Hanazonobashi and Yase ekimae
