= Minamoto clan =

Surname of Japanese imperial family members demoted into ranks of nobility

Minamoto 源氏
- The emblem (mon) of the Minamoto clan (three Japanese gentian flowers on five bamboo leaves)
- Home province: Heian-kyō (Modern Kyōto)
- Parent house: Imperial House of Japan (Emperor Saga)
- Titles: Shogun, Daimyō, Kuge, Daijō-daijin, Sadaijin, Udaijin, Kazoku, and others
- Founder: Various (Minamoto no Makoto as the first holder of the surname)
- Founding year: May 814 (1212 years ago)
- Ruled until: still extant
- Cadet branches: List: Saga Genji; Ninmyō Genji; Montoku Genji; Seiwa Genji; Yōzei Genji; Toba Genji; Ichijō Genji; Kōkō Genji; Uda Genji; En'yū Genji; Daigo Genji; Murakami Genji; Reizei Genji; Sutoku Genji; Kazan Genji; Sanjō Genji; Takakura Genji; Antoku Genji; Go-Toba Genji; Go-Sanjō Genji; Go-Shirakawa Genji; Juntoku Genji; Go-Saga Genji; Hanazono Genji; Go-Fusakusa Genji; Ōgimachi Genji; Go-Hanazono Genji

Minamoto (源; Japanese pronunciation: [mʲì.nä́.mó̞.tó̞]) was a noble surname bestowed by the Emperors of Japan upon members of the imperial family who were excluded from the line of succession and demoted into the ranks of the nobility since 814. Several noble lines were bestowed the surname, the most notable of which was the Seiwa Genji, whose descendants established the Kamakura and Ashikaga shogunates following the Heian era. The Minamoto was one of the four great clans that dominated Japanese politics during the Heian period in Japanese history—the other three were the Fujiwara, the Taira, and the Tachibana.

In the late Heian period, Minamoto rivalry with the Taira culminated in the Genpei War (1180–1185 AD). The Minamoto emerged victorious and established Japan's first shogunate in Kamakura under Minamoto no Yoritomo, who appointed himself as shōgun in 1192, ushering in the Kamakura period (1192–1333 AD) of Japanese history. The name "Genpei" comes from alternate readings of the kanji "Minamoto" (源 Gen) and "Taira" (平 Hei).

The Kamakura Shogunate was overthrown by Emperor Go-Daigo in the Kenmu Restoration of 1333. Three years later the Kenmu government would then itself be overthrown by the Ashikaga clan, descendants of the Seiwa Genji who established the Ashikaga shogunate (1333 to 1573).

The Minamoto clan is also called the Genji (源氏; [ɡeɲ.dʑi]; lit. 'Minamoto clan'), or less frequently, the Genke (源家; "House of Minamoto"), using the on'yomi readings of gen (源) for "Minamoto", while shi or ji (氏) means "clan", and ke (家) is used as a suffix for "extended family".

== History ==
The Emperors of Japan bestowed noble surnames upon members of the imperial family who were excluded from the line of succession and demoted into the ranks of the nobility. In May 814, the first emperor to grant the surname "Minamoto" was Emperor Saga, to his seventh son—Minamoto no Makoto, in Heian-Kyō (modern Kyōto). The practice was most prevalent during the Heian period (794–1185 AD), although its last occurrence was during the Sengoku period. The Taira were another such offshoot of the imperial dynasty, making both clans distant relatives.

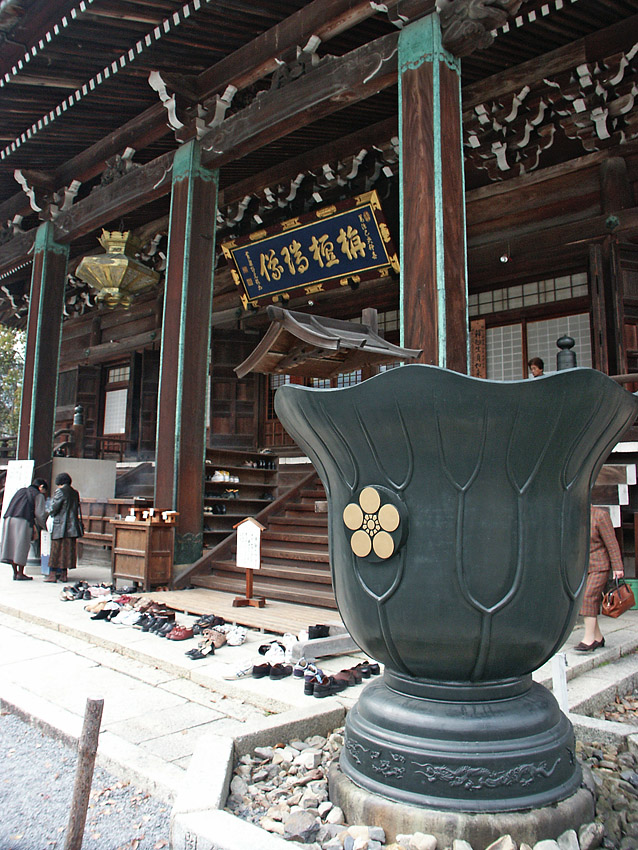
Seiryō-ji, a temple in Kyoto, was once a villa of Minamoto no Tōru (d. 895), a prominent member of the Saga Genji

The most prominent of the several Minamoto families, the Seiwa Genji, descended from Minamoto no Tsunemoto (897–961), a grandson of Emperor Seiwa. Tsunemoto went to the provinces and became the founder of a major warrior dynasty. Minamoto no Mitsunaka (912–997) formed an alliance with the Fujiwara. Thereafter the Fujiwara frequently called upon the Minamoto to restore order in the capital, Heian-Kyō (modern Kyōto).Mitsunaka's eldest son, Minamoto no Yorimitsu (948–1021), became the protégé of Fujiwara no Michinaga; another son, Minamoto no Yorinobu (968–1048) suppressed the rebellion of Taira no Tadatsune in 1032. Yorinobu's son, Minamoto no Yoriyoshi (988–1075), and grandson, Minamoto no Yoshiie (1039–1106), pacified most of northeastern Japan between 1051 and 1087.

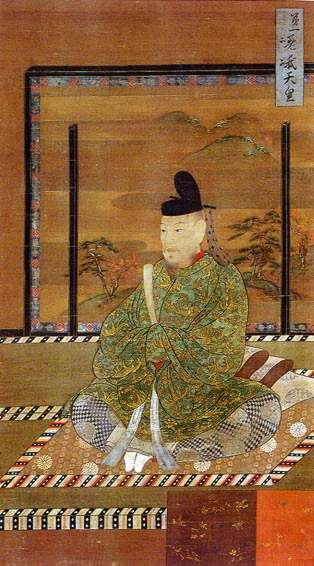
Emperor Saga (786 – 842)

The Seiwa Genji's fortunes declined in the Hōgen Rebellion (1156), when the Taira executed most of the line, including Minamoto no Tameyoshi. During the Heiji Disturbance (1160), the head of the Seiwa Genji, Minamoto no Yoshitomo, died in battle. Taira no Kiyomori seized power in Kyoto by forging an alliance with the retired emperors Go-Shirakawa and Toba and infiltrating the kuge. He sent Minamoto no Yoritomo (1147–1199), the third son of Minamoto no Yoshimoto of the Seiwa Genji, into exile. In 1180, during the Genpei War, Yoritomo mounted a full-scale rebellion against the Taira rule, culminating in the destruction of the Taira and the subjugation of eastern Japan within five years. In 1192, he received the title shōgun and set up the first bakufu in the history of Japan at Kamakura—Kamakura shogunate.

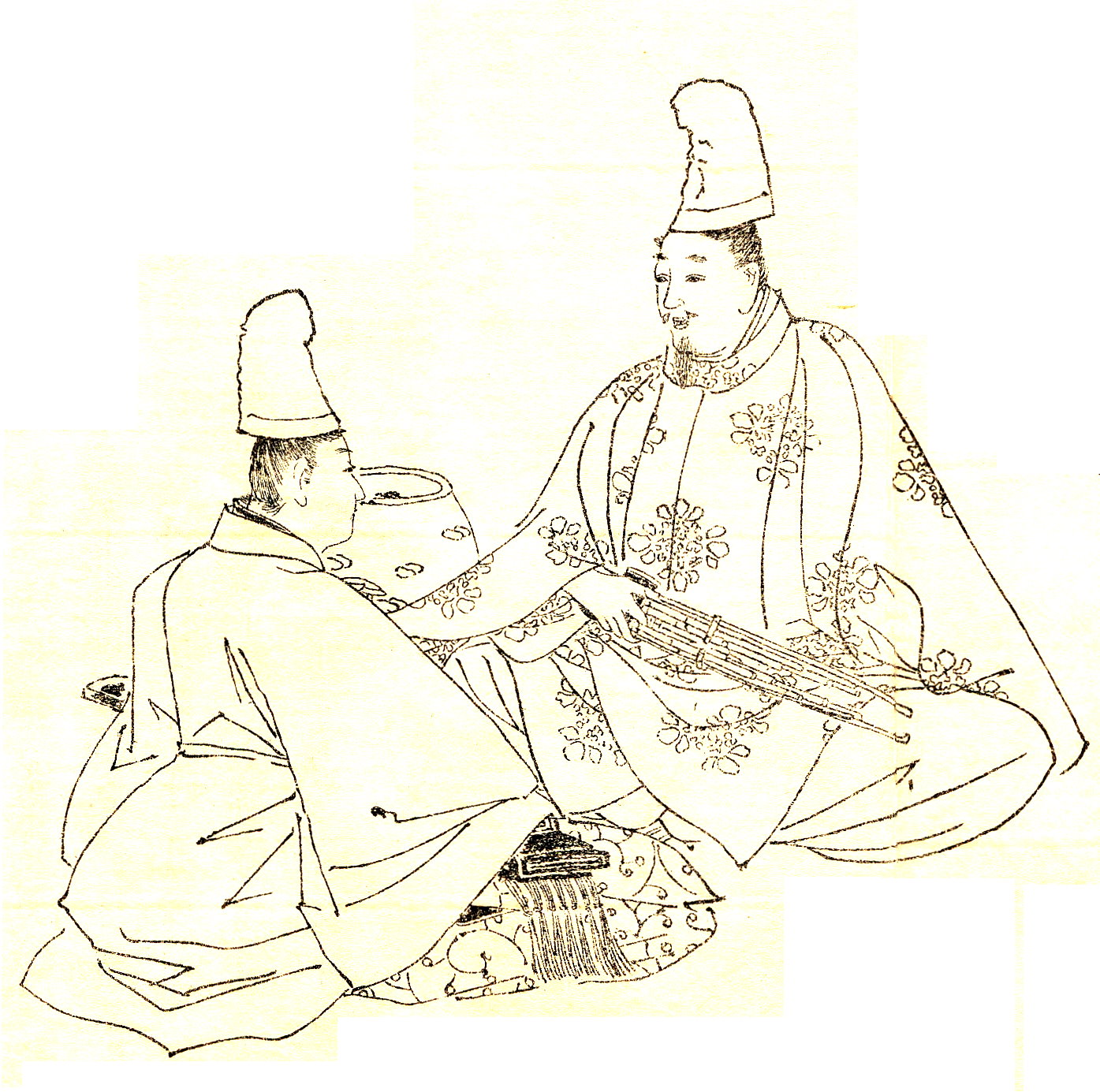
Minamoto no Makoto (810 – 868)

The later Ashikaga (founders of the Ashikaga shogunate of Muromachi period), Nitta, Takeda, and Tokugawa (founders of the Tokugawa shogunate of Edo period) clans claim descents from the Minamoto clan (Seiwa Genji branch).

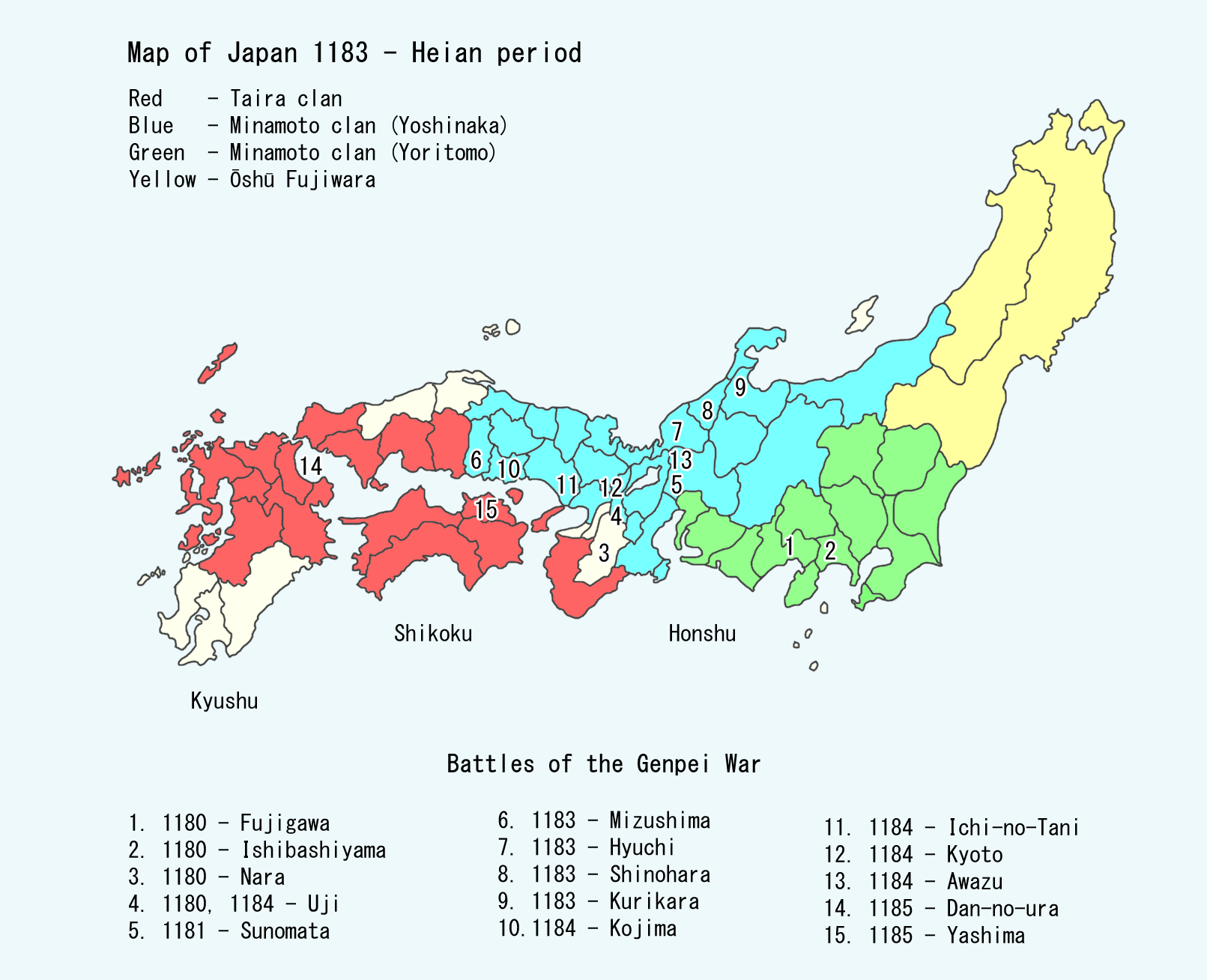
The domain of the Minamoto clan in Japan (1183) during the Genpei War

The protagonist of the classical Japanese novel The Tale of Genji (The Tale of Minamoto clan)—Hikaru Genji, was bestowed the name Minamoto for political reasons by his father the emperor and was delegated to civilian life and a career as an imperial officer.

The Genpei War is also the subject of the early Japanese epic The Tale of the Heike (Heike Monogatari).

== Members of the Minamoto clan (Genji clan) ==
Even within royalty there was a distinction between princes with the title shinnō (親王), who could ascend to the throne, and princes with the title ō (王), who were not members of the line of imperial succession but nevertheless remained members of the royal class (and therefore outranked members of Minamoto clans). The bestowing of the Minamoto name on a (theretofore-)prince or his descendants excluded them from the royal class altogether, thereby operating as a reduction in legal and social rank even for ō-princes not previously in the line of succession.

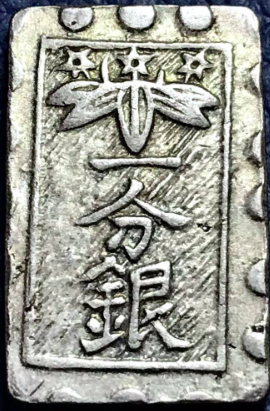
Old silver coin with mon(emblem) of the Minamoto clan (Seiwa Genji), found in Edo period

Many later clans were formed by members of the Minamoto clan, and in many early cases, progenitors of these clans are known by either family name. There are also known monks of Minamoto descent; these are often noted in genealogies but did not carry the clan name (in favour of a dharma name).

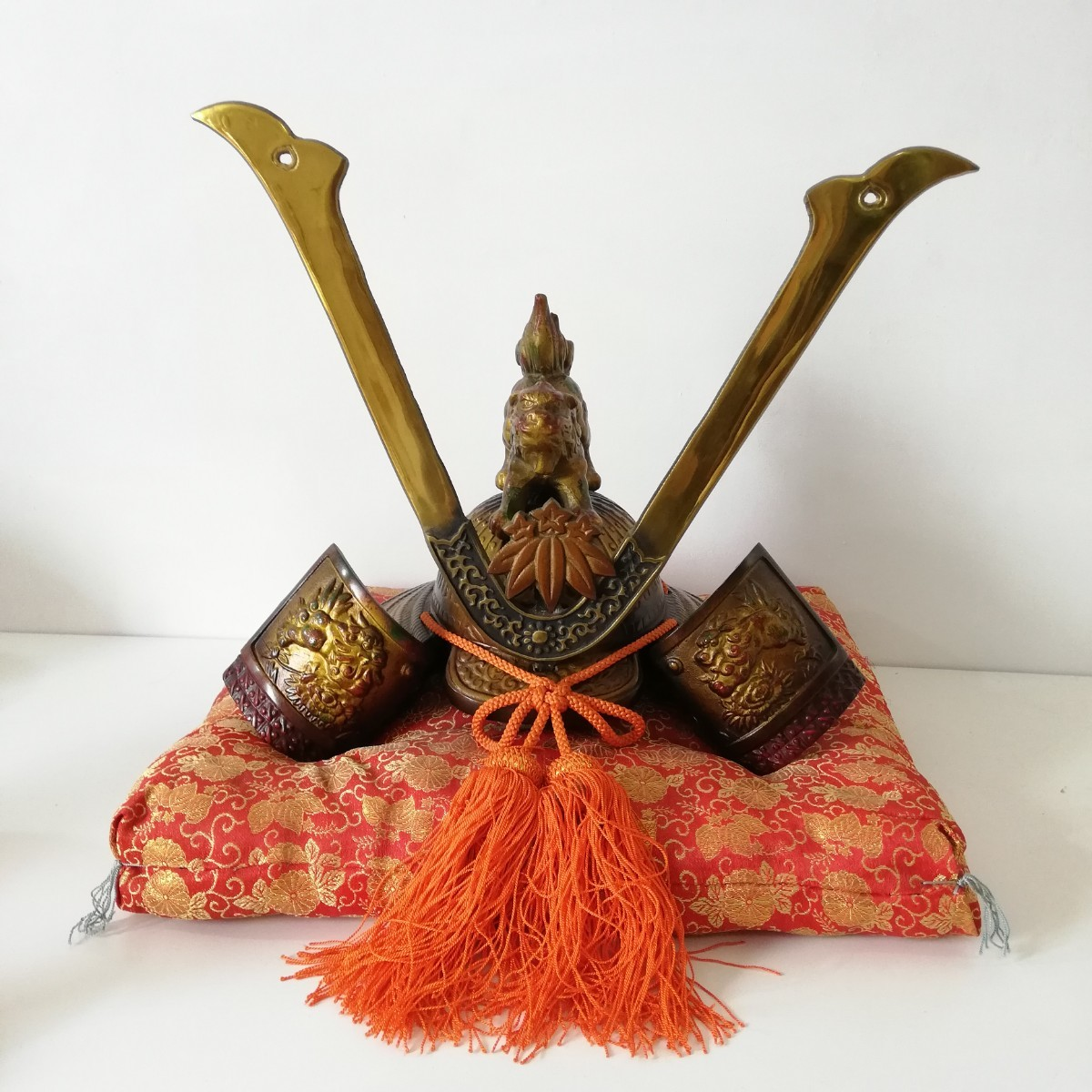
Kabuto attached with Mon (emblem) of Minamoto clan (sasa-rindou)

The Minamoto is the ancestor and parent clan of many notable descendant clans, some of which are Ashikaga, Tokugawa, Matsudaira, Nitta, Takeda, Shimazu, Sasaki, Akamatsu, Kitabatake, Tada, Ota, Toki, Yamana, Satomi, Hosokawa, Satake, Yamamoto, Hemi, Ogasawara, Yasuda, Takenouchi, Hiraga, Imagawa, Miyake, etc.

There were 21 branches of the clan, each named after the emperor from whom it descended. Some of these lineages were populous, but a few did not produce descendants.

=== Saga Genji ===
The Saga Genji are descendants of Emperor Saga. As Saga had many children, many were bestowed the uji Minamoto, declassing them from imperial succession. Among his sons, Makoto, Tokiwa, and Tōru took the position of Minister of the Left (sadaijin); they were among the most powerful in the Imperial Court in the early Heian period. Some of Tōru's descendants in particular settled the provinces and formed buke. Clans such as the Watanabe, Matsuura, and Kamachi descend from the Saga Genji.

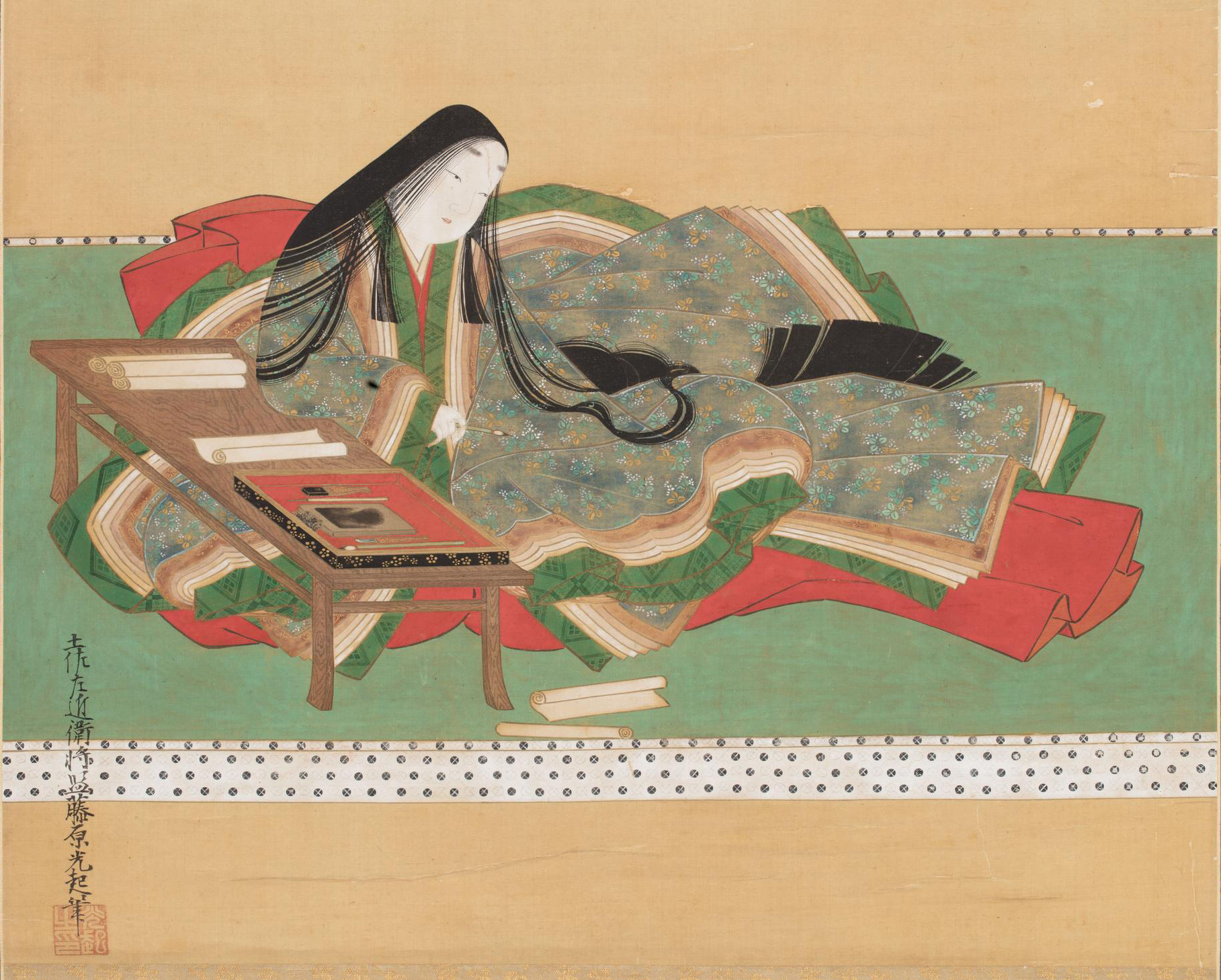
Murasaki Shikibu composing Genji Monogatari (The Tale of Genji)

Noted Saga Genji and descendants include:

- Minamoto no Makoto, seventh son of the Emperor
- Minamoto no Hiromu, eighth son of the Emperor
  - Minamoto no Hitoshi, grandson of Hiromu
- Minamoto no Tokiwa, son of the Emperor
  - Minamoto no Okoru, first son of Tokiwa
- Minamoto no Sadamu, son of the Emperor
  - Minamoto no Shitagō, great-grandson of Sadamu
- Minamoto no Hiroshi, son of the Emperor
- Minamoto no Tōru, son of the Emperor
  Portrait of Minamoto no Yoritomo (1147–1199) in 1179, by Fujiwara no Takanobu
  - Minamoto no Anbō (secular name Minamoto no Shitagō), great-grandson of Tōru
  - Watanabe no Tsuna (his official name was Minamoto no Tsuna, who resided at Watanabe in Settsu province, and took the name of the place), great-great-grandson of Tōru
    - Matsuura Hisashi, great-grandson of Tsuna
  - Minamoto no Koreshige, grandson of Tōru
    - Minamoto no Mitsusue, great-great-grandson of Koreshige
- Minamoto no Tsutomu, son of the Emperor
- Minamoto no Hiraku, son of the Emperor

History records indicate that at least three of Emperor Saga's daughters were also made Minamoto (Minamoto no Kiyohime, Minamoto no Sadahime, and Minamoto no Yoshihime), but few records concerning his daughters are known.

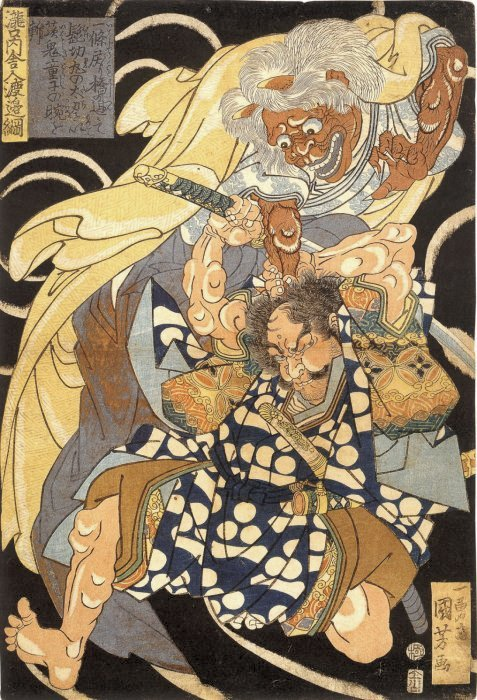
Minamoto no Tsuna cutting the arm off the demon Ibaraki

=== Ninmyō Genji ===
They were descendants of Emperor Ninmyō. His sons Minamoto no Masaru and Minamoto no Hikaru were udaijin. Among Hikaru's descendants was Minamoto no Atsushi, adoptive father of the Saga Genji's Watanabe no Tsuna and father of the Seiwa Genji's Minamoto no Mitsunaka's wife.

=== Montoku Genji ===
These were descendants of Emperor Montoku. Among them, Minamoto no Yoshiari was a sadaijin, and among his descendants were the Sakado clan who were Hokumen no Bushi.

=== Seiwa Genji ===
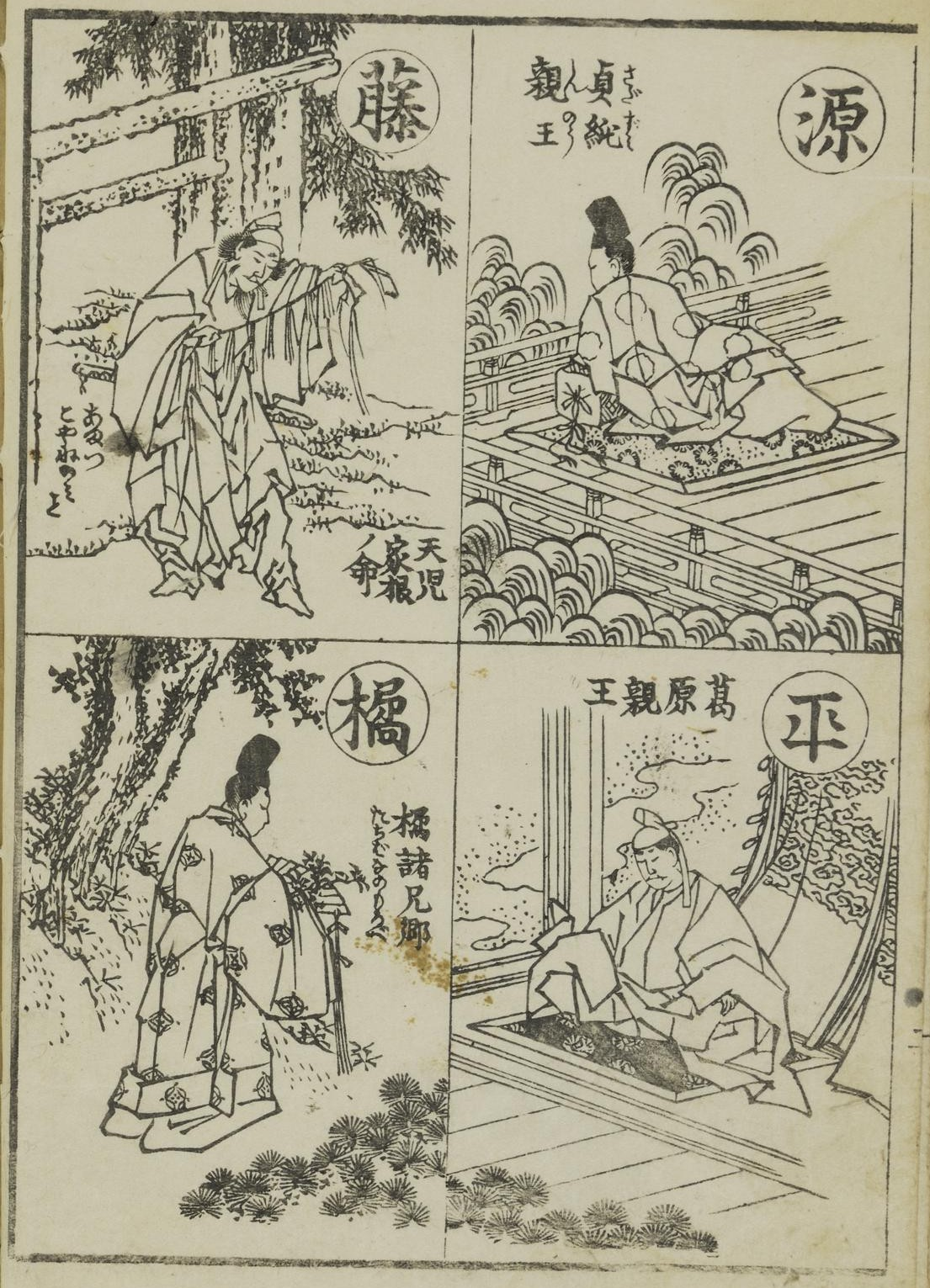
Prince Sadazumi (in the top right) as depicted in an illustration "Genpei Meitō Ehon Musha Burui" (源平名頭絵本武者部類) (created by Katsushika Hokusai in 1841) depicting all each four ancestors of four noble clans. Most Seiwa Genji clans survived through his lineage.

These were descendants of Emperor Seiwa. The most numerous of them were those descended from Minamoto no Tsunemoto, son of Prince Sadazumi. Hachimantarō Yoshiie of the Kawachi Genji was a leader of a buke. His descendants set up the Kamakura shogunate, making his a prestigious pedigree claimed by many buke, particularly for the direct descendants in the Ashikaga clan (that set up the Ashikaga shogunate) and the rival Nitta clan. Centuries later, Tokugawa Ieyasu would claim descent from the Seiwa Genji by way of the Nitta clan.

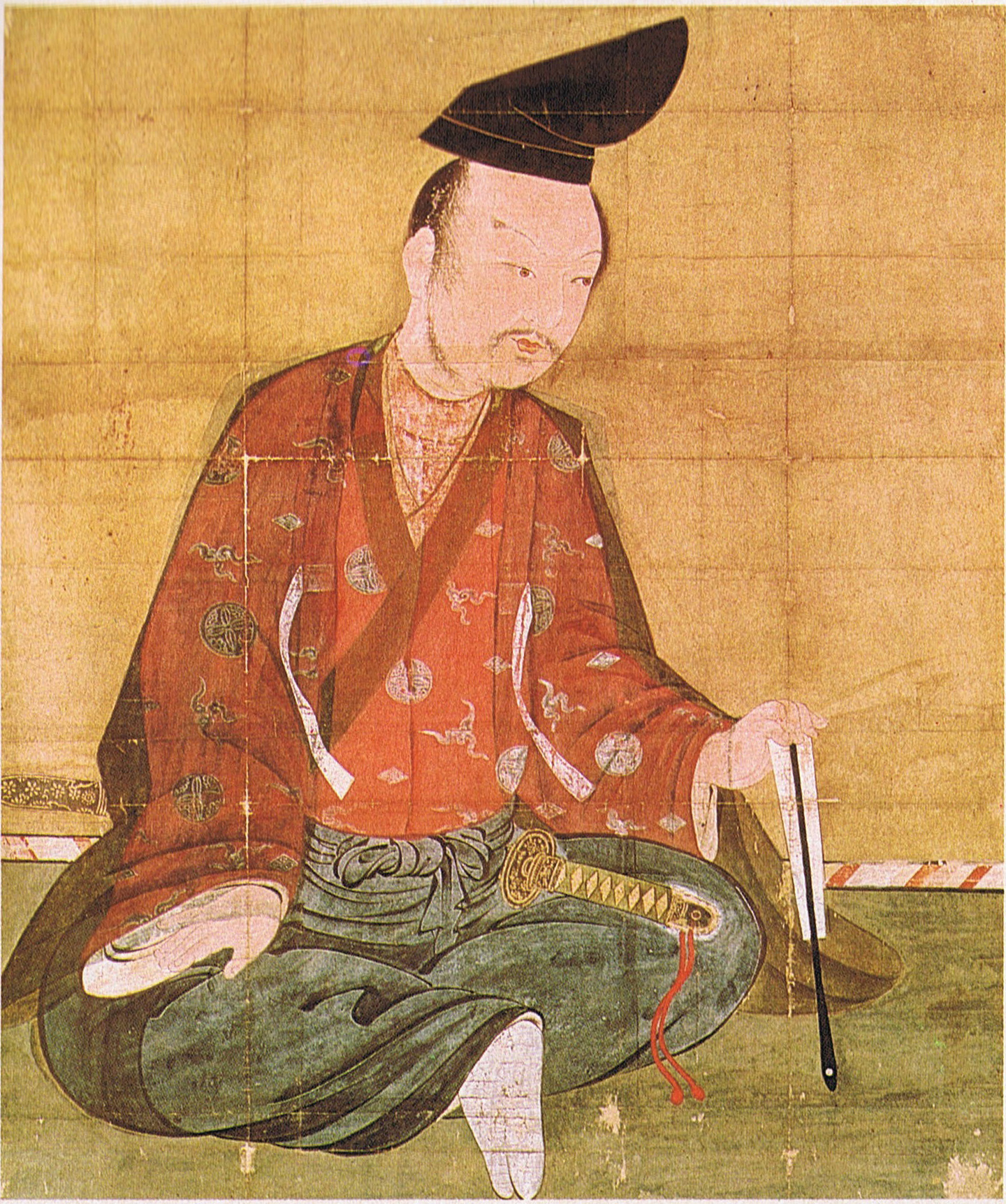
Portrait of Minamoto no Yoshitsune (1159–1189)

=== Yōzei Genji ===
These were descendants of Emperor Yōzei. While Minamoto no Tsunemoto is termed the ancestor of the Seiwa Genji, there is evidence (rediscovered in the late 19th century by Hoshino Hisashi) suggesting that he was actually the grandson of Emperor Yōzei rather than of Emperor Seiwa. This theory is not widely accepted as fact, but as Yōzei was deposed for reprehensible behaviour, there would have been a compelling motive to claim descent from more auspicious origins if it were the case.

=== Kōkō Genji ===
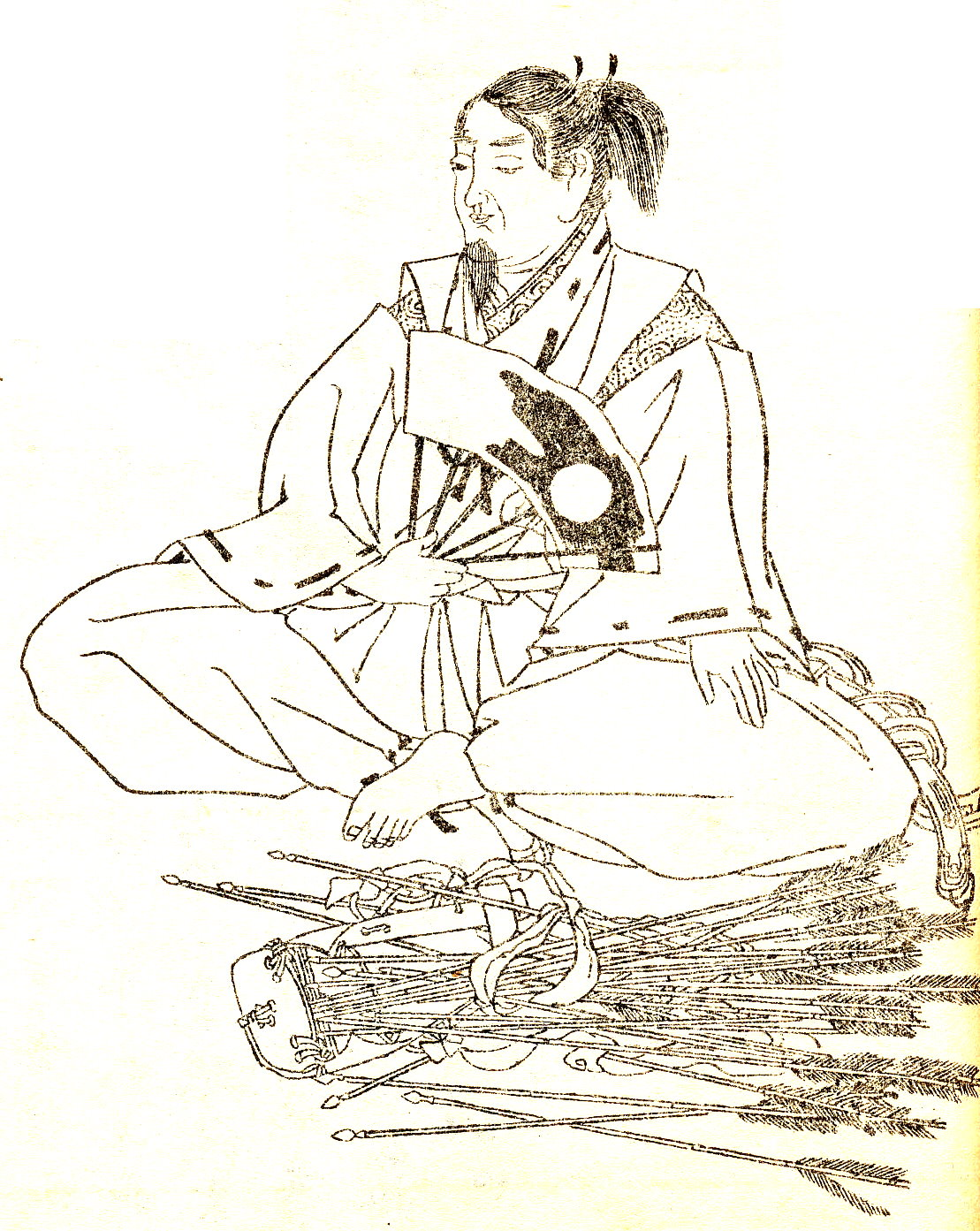
Minamoto no Tsunemoto (894–961)

These were descendants of Emperor Kōkō. The great-grandson of his firstborn Prince Koretada, Kōshō, was the ancestor of a line of busshi, from which various styles of Buddhist sculpture emerged. Kōshō's grandson Kakujo established the Shichijō Bussho workshop.

=== Uda Genji ===
These were descendants of Emperor Uda. Two sons of Prince Atsumi, Minamoto no Masanobu and Minamoto no Shigenobu became sadaijin. Masanobu's children in particular flourished, forming five dōjō houses as kuge, and as buke the Sasaki clan of the Ōmi Genji, and the Izumo Genji.

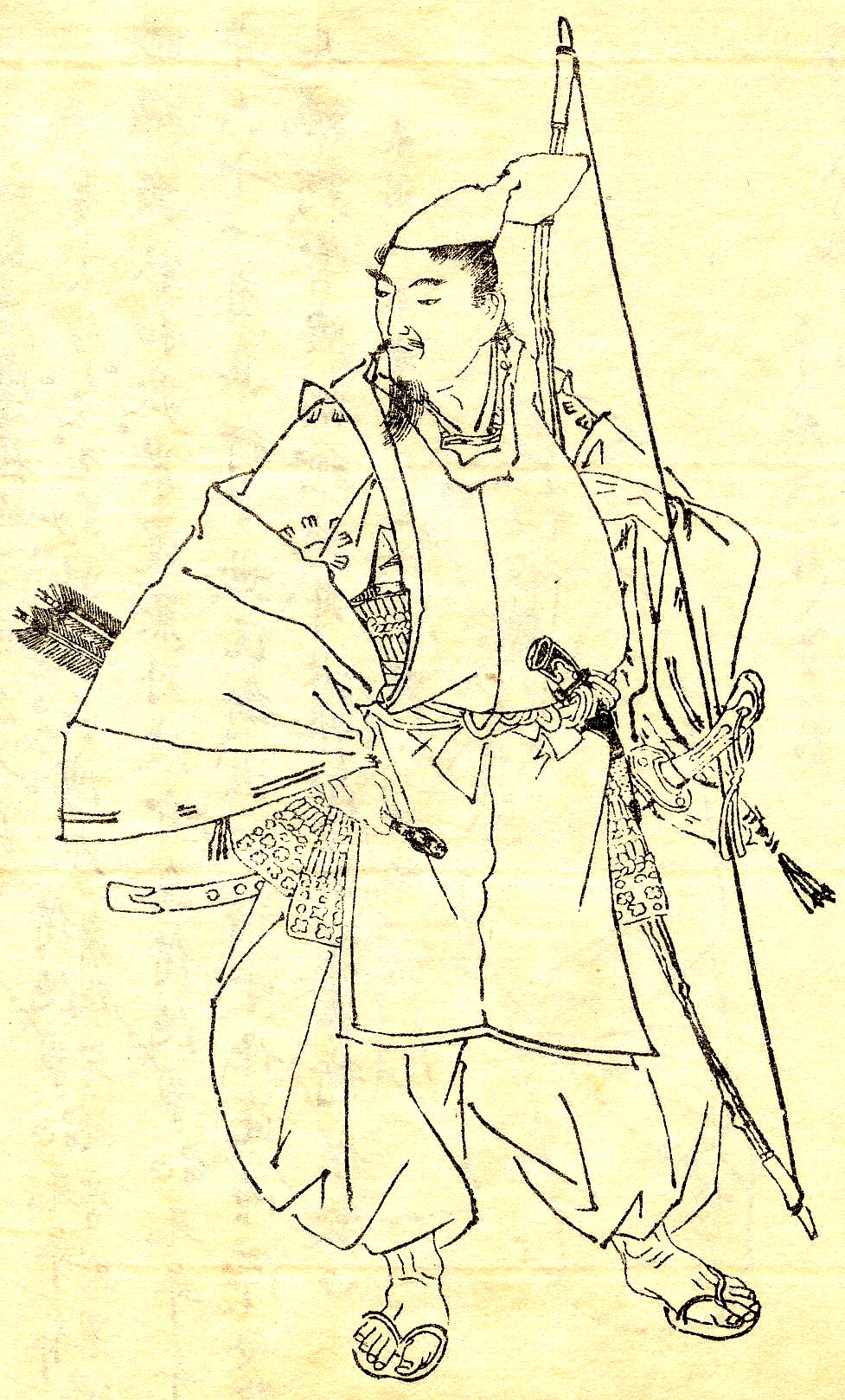
Minamoto no Yorimitsu (948–1021)

=== Daigo Genji ===
These were descendants of Emperor Daigo. His son Minamoto no Takaakira became a sadaijin, but his downfall came during the Anna incident. Takaakira's descendants include the Okamoto and Kawajiri clans. Daigo's grandson Minamoto no Hiromasa was a reputed musician.

=== Murakami Genji ===
These were descendants of Emperor Murakami. His grandson Morofusa was an udaijin and had many descendants, among them several houses of dōjō kuge. Until the Ashikaga clan took it during the Muromachi period, the title of Genji no Chōja always fell to one of Morofusa's progeny.

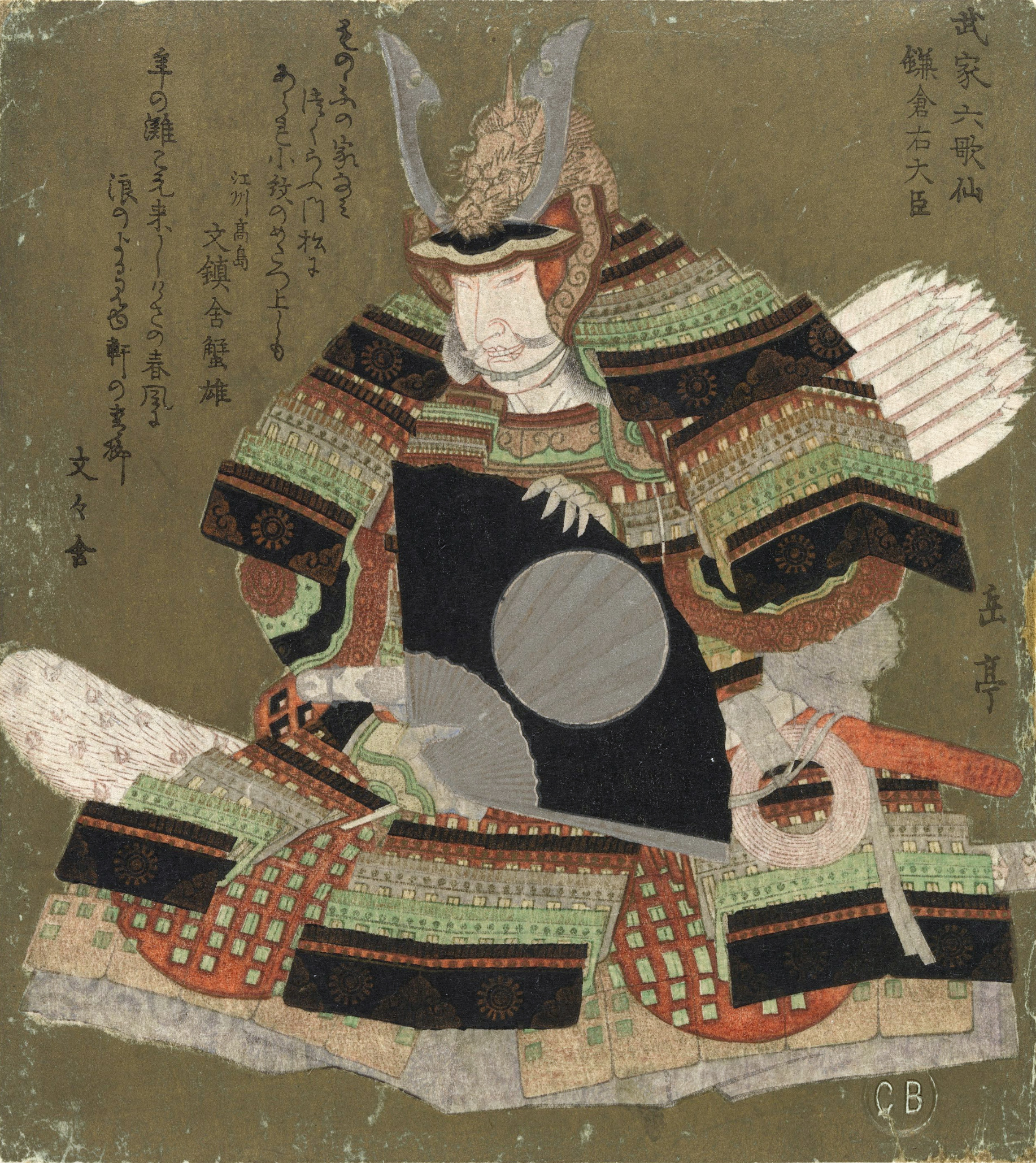
Painting of Minamoto no Sanetomo (1192–1219) – Kamakura Udaijin

=== Reizei Genji ===
These were descendants of Emperor Reizei. Though they are included among the listing of 21 Genji lineages, no concrete record of the names of his descendants made Minamoto is known to survive.

=== Kazan Genji ===
These were descendants of Emperor Kazan. They became the dōjō Shirakawa family, which headed the Jingi-kan for centuries, responsible for the centralised aspects of Shinto.

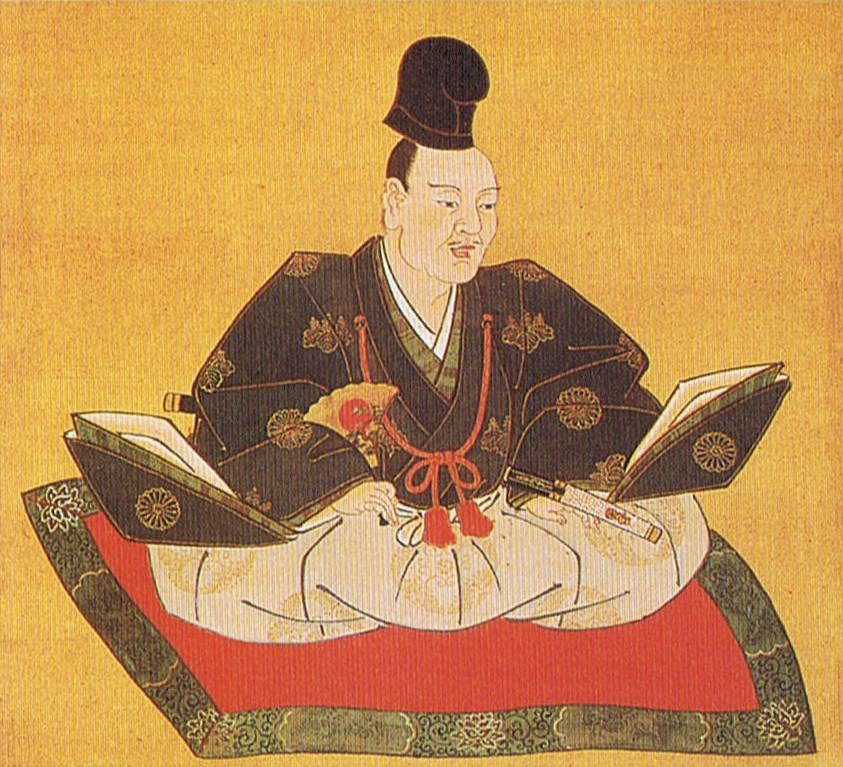
A portrait of Minamoto no Yoshinaka (1154–1184)

=== Sanjō Genji ===
These were descendants of Emperor Sanjō's son Prince Atsuakira. Starting with one of them, Minamoto no Michisue, the position of Ōkimi-no-kami (chief genealogist of the imperial family) in the Ministry of the Imperial Household was passed down hereditarily.

=== Go-Sanjō Genji ===
These were descendants of Emperor Go-Sanjō's son Prince Sukehito. Sukehito's son Minamoto no Arihito was a sadaijin. Minamoto no Yoritomo's vassal Tashiro Nobutsuna, who appears in the Tale of the Heike, was allegedly Arihito's grandson (according to the Genpei Jōsuiki).

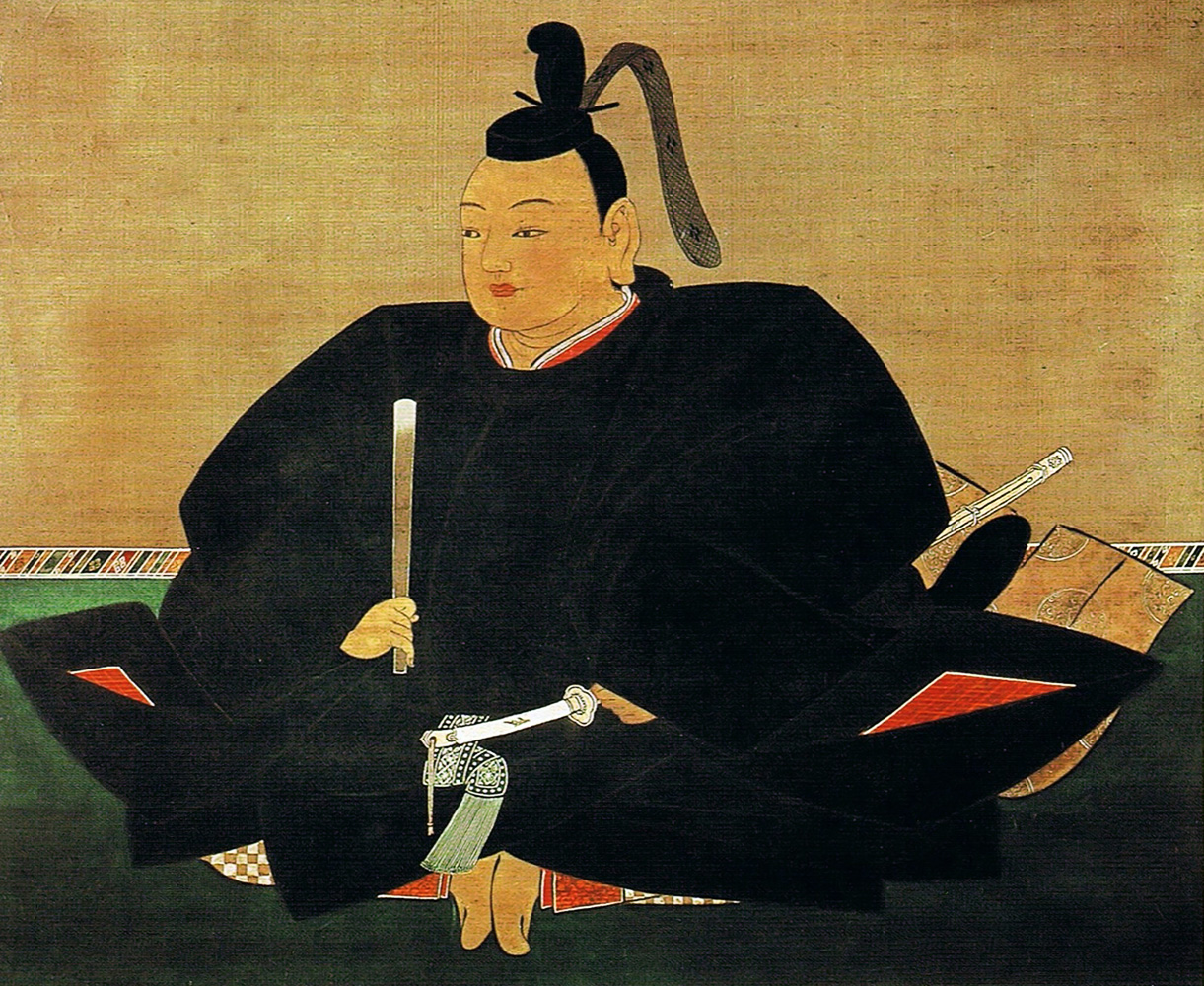
Minamoto no Yoriie (1182–1204)

=== Go-Shirakawa Genji ===
This line consisted solely of Emperor Go-Shirakawa son Mochihito-ō (Takakura-no-Miya). As part of the succession dispute that led to the opening hostilities of the Genpei War, he was declassed (renamed "Minamoto no Mochimitsu") and exiled.

=== Juntoku Genji ===
These were descendants of Emperor Juntoku's sons Tadanari-ō and Prince Yoshimune. The latter's grandson Yoshinari rose to sadaijin with the help of Ashikaga Yoshimitsu.

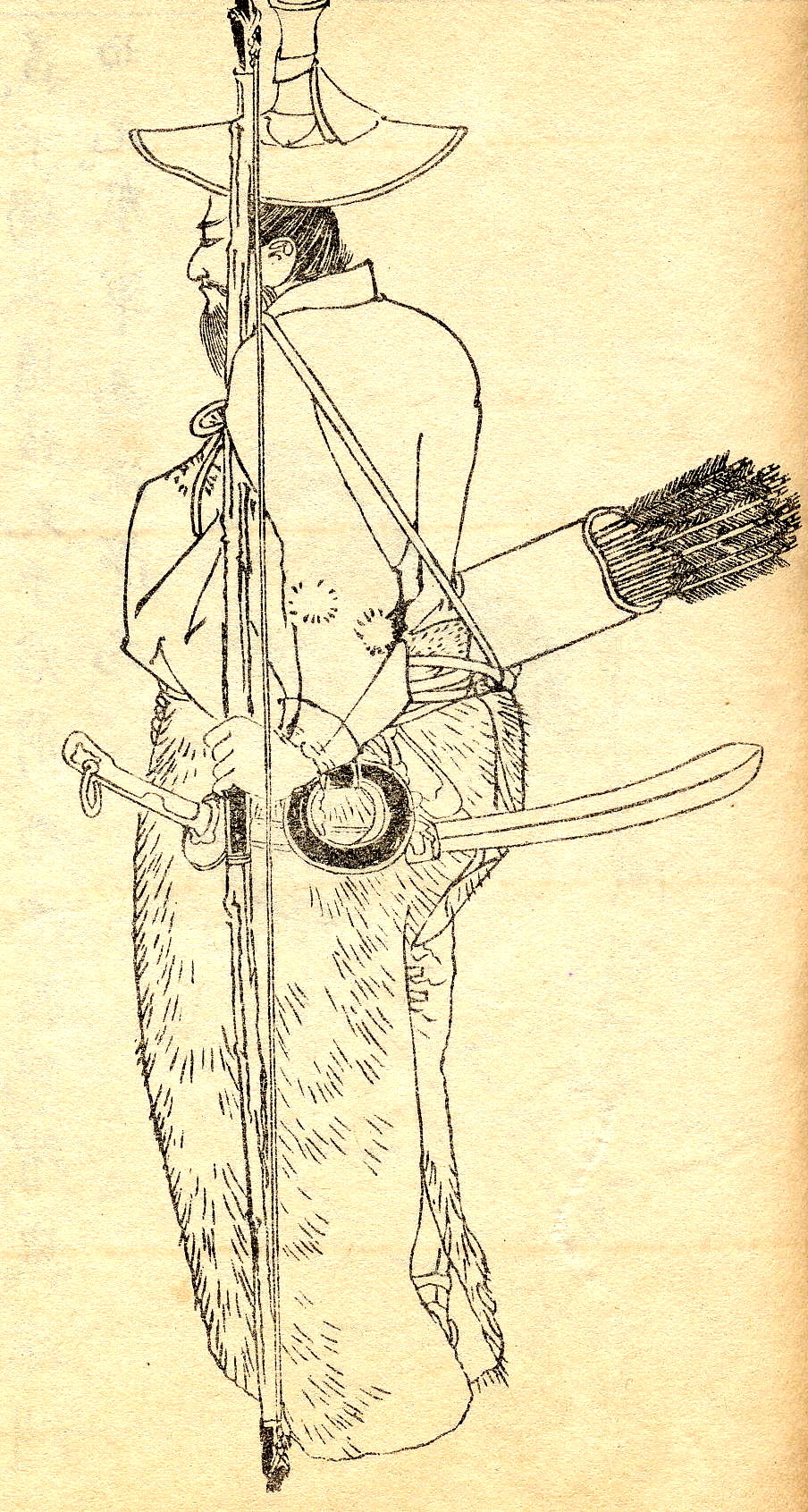
Minamoto no Yorinobu (968–1048)

=== Go-Saga Genji ===
This line consisted solely of Emperor Go-Saga's grandson Prince Koreyasu. Koreyasu-ō was installed as a puppet shōgun (the seventh of the Kamakura shogunate) at a young age, and was renamed "Minamoto no Koreyasu" a few years later. After he was deposed, he regained royal status, and became a monk soon after, thereby losing the Minamoto name.

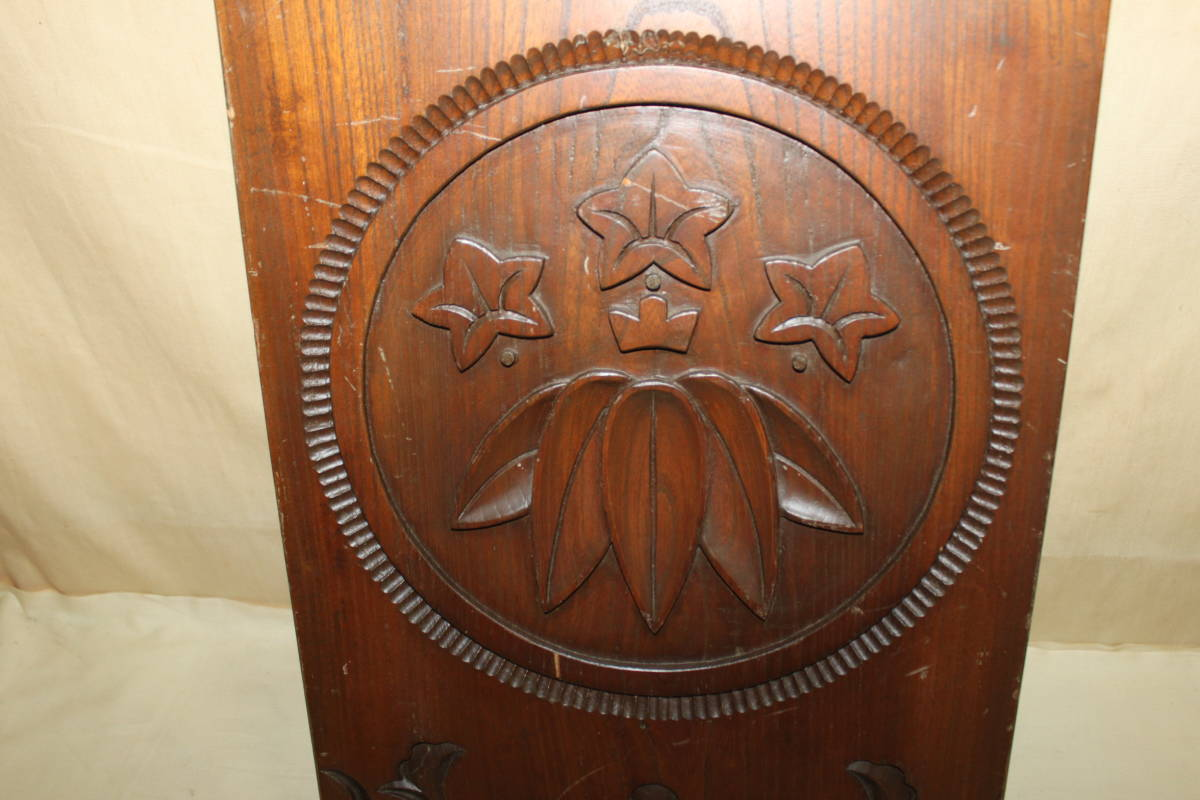
A wooden signboard with a family crest of Minamoto clan (sasa-rindou)

=== Go-Fusakusa Genji ===
These were descendants of Emperor Go-Fukakusa's son Prince Hisaaki (the eighth shōgun of the Kamakura shogunate). Hisaaki's sons Prince Morikuni (the next shōgun) and Prince Hisayoshi were made Minamoto. Hisayoshi's adopted "nephew" (actually Nijō Michihira's son) Muneaki became a gon-dainagon (acting dainagon).

=== Ōgimachi Genji ===
These were non-royal descendants of Emperor Ōgimachi. At first they were buke, but they later became dōjō-ke, the Hirohata family.

== Legacy ==
=== Historical periods and cities founding ===
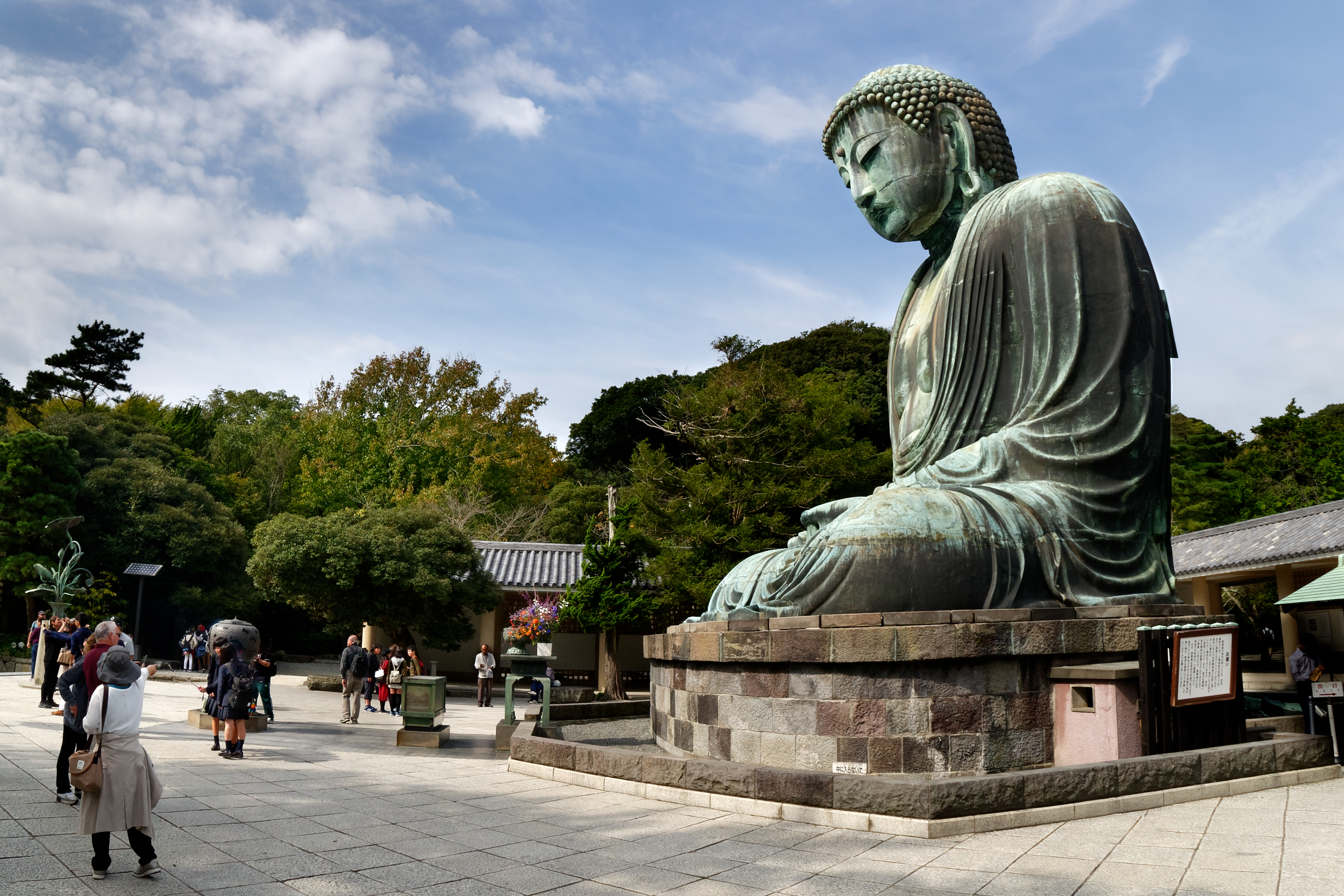
The statue of Amida Buddha at Kōtoku-in, Kamakura

- Kamakura period and Kamakura city, which were established and founded by Minamoto no Yoritomo—the first shōgun of Japan.
- Muromachi period was founded by shōgun Ashikaga Takauji—a direct descendant of Minamoto no Yoshiyasu (also known as Ashikaga Yoshiyasu).
- Edo period was founded by shōgun Tokugawa Ieyasu—who claimed to be a descendant of Minamoto no Yoshishige (also known as Nitta Yoshishige).

=== Shinto shrines founding ===
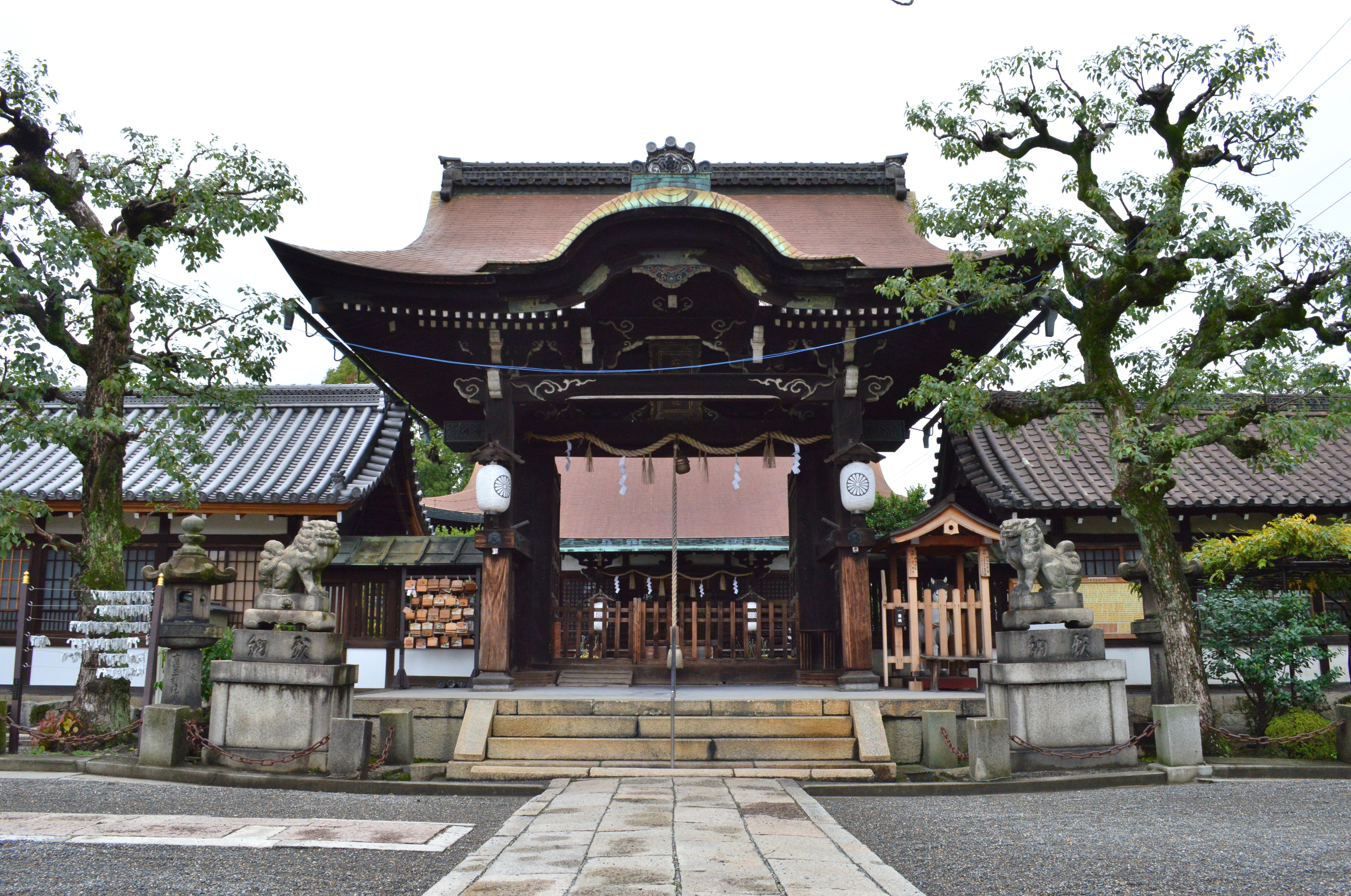
Shinmon of Rokusonnō Shrine in Kyoto

- Three Genji Shrines (源氏三神社, Genji San Jinja) - A group of Shinto shrines connected closedly with the members of Seiwa Genji branch of the Minamoto clan.
  - Rokusonnō Shrine, Minami-ku, Kyoto, Kyoto Prefecture
  - Tada Jinja, Kawanishi, Hyōgo Prefecture
  - Tsuboi Hachimangū, Habikino, Osaka Prefecture
- Sasaki Shrine (沙沙貴神社) - a Shinto shrine connected closely with the members of Uda Genji branch of the Minamoto clan.

=== Literature and arts ===
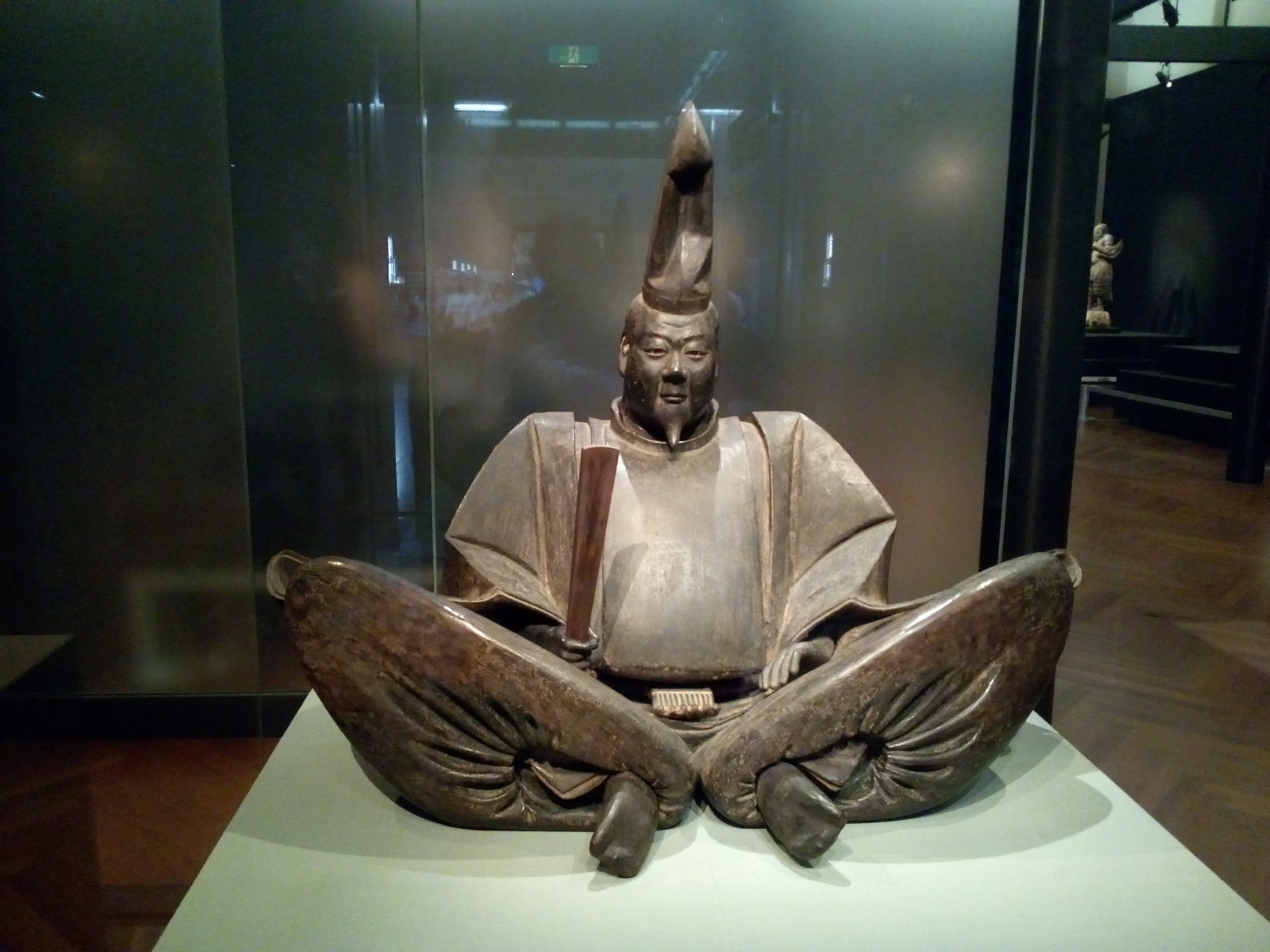
Seated Portrait of Minamoto no Yoritomo - Important Cultural Property in Tokyo National Museum

- The Tale of Genji (源氏物語, Genji monogatari; The Tale of the Minamoto clan) by Murasaki Shikibu, an important 11th-century classical Japanese novel.
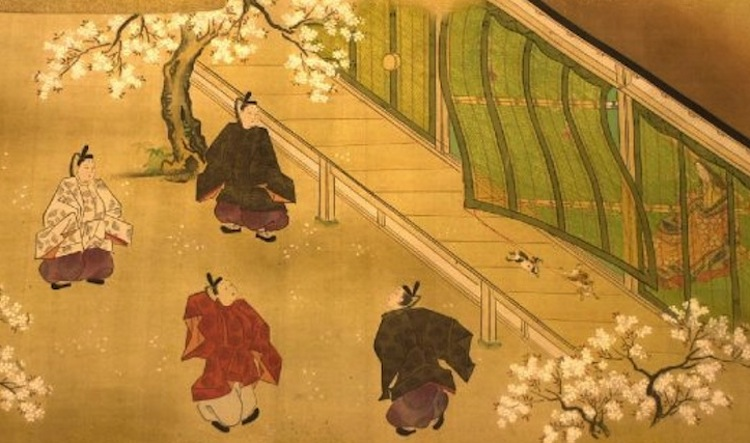
  Genji monogatari
- The Tale of the Heike (平家物語, Heike Monogatari; The Tale of house of Taira), a 14th-century epic poetry compiled of the struggle between the Minamoto clan and the Taira clan for control of Japan at the end of the 12th century in the Genpei War (1180–1185).

== See also ==
- History of Japan
- Japanese clans
- Minamoto (surname)
- Minamoto Yoritomo
