= Tada Shrine =

Shinto shrine in Hyōgo Prefecture, Japan

Tada Shrine 多田神社
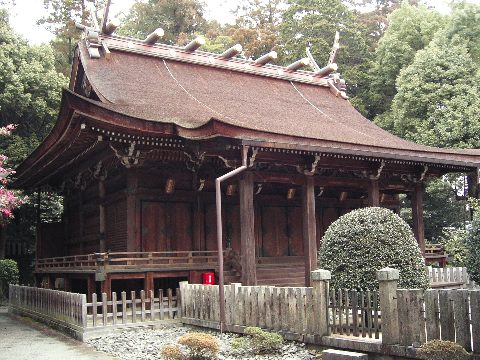
- Honden of Tada Shrine

- Tada Shrine Tada Shrine (Japan)

Religion
- Affiliation: Shinto
- Festivals: April 10 and October 27

Location
- Location: 1-1 Tadain Tadadokorocho, Kawanishi-shi, Hyōgo-ken 666-0127
- Interactive map of Tada Shrine 多田神社
- Coordinates: 34°51′40.6″N 135°24′9.4″E

Architecture
- Established: 978 AD

Website
- Official website

Tada Shrine (多田神社) is a Shinto shrine in the Tadadokoro neighborhood of the city of Kawanishi in Hyōgo Prefecture, Japan. The shrine is also called ‘Tada-Daigongen-Sha’ or ‘Kansai Nikko’, literally, ‘Nikko of Western Japan’. This shrine is the shrine of the Seiwa Genji clan from which Minamoto no Yoritomo and many subsequent Shogun and daimyō clans claimed descent. This shrine is one of Three Genji Shrines, with Rokusonnō Shrine in Kyoto and Tsuboi Hachimangū in Osaka. The shrine was designated a National Historic Site in 1951.

== Enshrined kami ==
The kami enshrined at Tada Jinja are:

- Minamoto no Mitsunaka (源満仲), also known as Tada Daigongen (多田大権現) Minamoto no Mitsunaka, also known as Tada no Manjū, is the oldest son of Minamoto no Tsunemoto. Due to his involvement in exposing the Anna Incident, he established himself to be a formidable samurai and was able to earn many governmental positions in various provinces. After serving as governor of Settsu Province, he helped to train various samurais alongside his retainers. Later on in his last few years, Mitsunaka became a Buddhist monk.
- Minamoto no Yorimitsu (源頼光) Minamoto no Yorimitsu is the eldest son of Mitsunaka. He served the Fujiwara clan and accumulated a great deal of wealth through holding government positions over many provinces. He is most famous for his endeavors with his Four Heavenly Kings in later years, such as the subjugation of Shuten-douji and the extermination of the Tsuchigumo. Yorimitsu inherited his father’s post as governor of Settsu Province and eventually became the founder of the Settsu-Genji.
- Minamoto no Yorinobu (源頼信) Minamoto no Yorinobu is the third son of Mitsunaka. Along with his elder brother Yorimitsu, he served the Fujiwara clan and held the position of Commander-in-Chief of the Defense of the North. He was noted for having excellent martial prowess, and by suppressing Taira no Tadatsune’s rebellion, he laid the foundation for the Minamoto to advance into the eastern part of the country. In his later years, after serving as the governor of Kawachi Province, he became the founder of the Kawachi-Genji line.
- Minamoto no Yoriyoshi (源頼義) Minamoto no Yoriyoshi is the eldest son of Yorinobu, inheriting his father’s excellent skill in martial arts. He gained fame in the eastern part of Japan during his time serving as Commander-in-Chief of the Defense of the North and as a naval base general. He guaranteed the high reputation and prosperity of the Minamoto in the eastern provinces by putting an end to the Early Nine Years’ War.
- Minamoto no Yoshiie (源義家) Minamoto no Yoshiie is the eldest son of Yoriyoshi, and he is widely known as “Hachiman-taro” due to his exceptional martial prowess. Following his father’s footsteps, he served as Commander-in-Chief of the Defense of the North and as a military leader in the eastern part of the country. He was able to successfully put an end to the Later Three Years’ War, earning him the title of the “greatest and bravest warrior in the world”.

== History ==
In 970, Settsu-no-kami Minamoto no Mitsunaka, the founder of the Seiwa Genji clan, received an oracle from Sumiyoshi Ōkami to established his residence in what is now Kawanishi. A temple (commonly known as Tada-in) was built, as Mitsunaka, converted to Buddhism following the visit of Ingen (954–1028), Genshin (942–1017), and Kaku'ub, of the Tendai sect. The new convert declared, "You have shown me such extraordinary virtuous things. I'm someone who has killed an immeasurable number of living things. I'd like to atone for these sins. By building a Buddhist Hall I will stop committing any more crimes and save the lives of living things." "What is known as Tada-in is a cluster of halls that began to be built with this one." When Mitsunaka died in 997 he was buried in Tada-in. In the Kamakura period, the temple was regarded as the ancestral mausoleum of Seiwa-Genji, but it gradually declined. In the middle of the Kamakura period, Hojo Yasutoki, the shikken of the Kamakura Shogunate, became the land steward of Tada-sho shōen, he decided to carry out a large-scale reconstruction of the Tada-in. In 1273, Ninsho of Saidai-ji was appointed to undertake the restoration, and as a result, the temple changed from the Tendai sect to the Shingon Risshu sect. In the Muromachi period, Ashikaga Takauji, who was a descendent of the Seiwa Genji, revered the Tada-in, and temple became a mortuary temple for the Ashikaga shogunate, with the ashes of successive generations of shogun buried at the temple. However, the temple was destroyed by the forces of Oda Nobunaga in 1577. It remained in ruins until restored in 1665 by Sakakibara Tadatsugu of Himeji Domain, Inaba Masanori of Odawara Domain and the descendants of the Tada-in retainers. Shogun Tokugawa Ietsuna granted an estate with a kokudaka of 500 koku for its upkeep, and most of its structures were rebuilt by 1667. As with the Ashikaga, successive generation of the Tokugawa shoguns ashes and ihai mortuary tablets with enshrined at the temple. Shogun Tokugawa Tsunayoshi restored the main shrine building in 1695.

In the Meiji period, due to the separation of Shintoism and Buddhism by the government, Tada-in was transformed into a Shinto shrine enshrining Minamoto no Mitsunaka, Minamoto no Yorimitsu, Minamoto no Yorinobu, Minamoto no Yoriyoshi, and Minamoto no Yoshiie as kami. The shrine was ranked as a Prefectural Shrine under the Modern system of ranked Shinto Shrines.

== Gallery ==
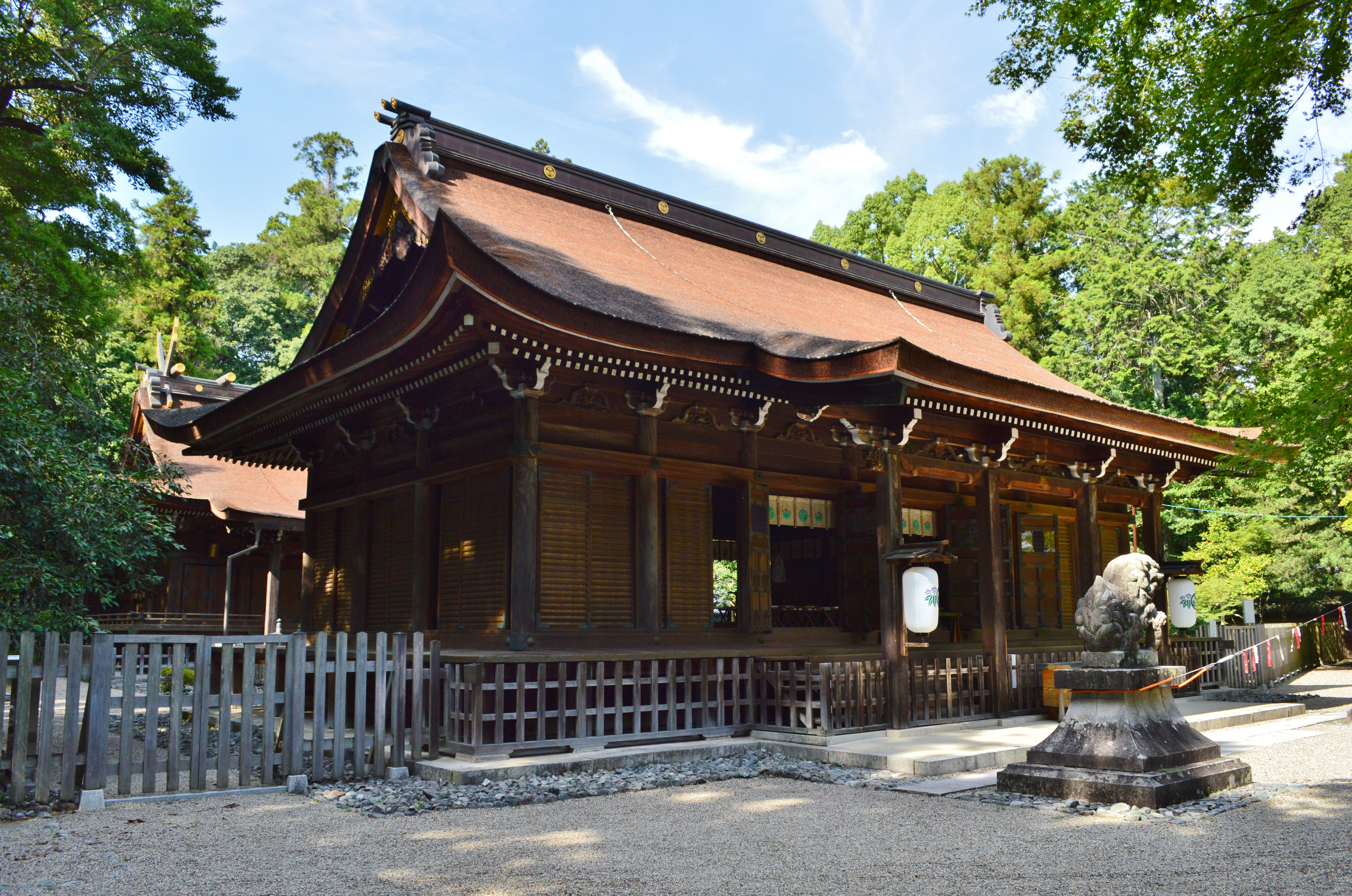
Haiden (ICP)

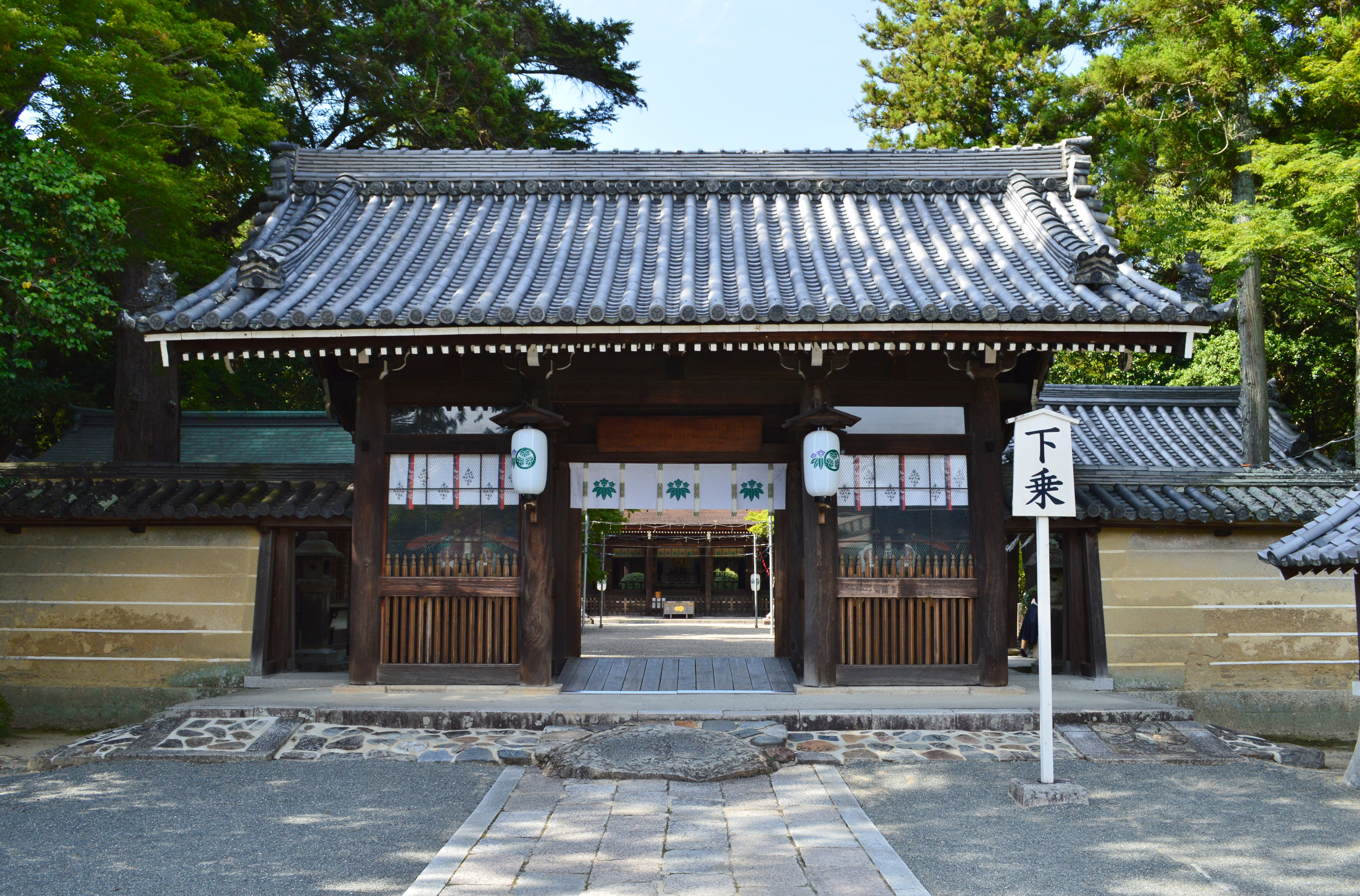
Zuishinmon (ICP)

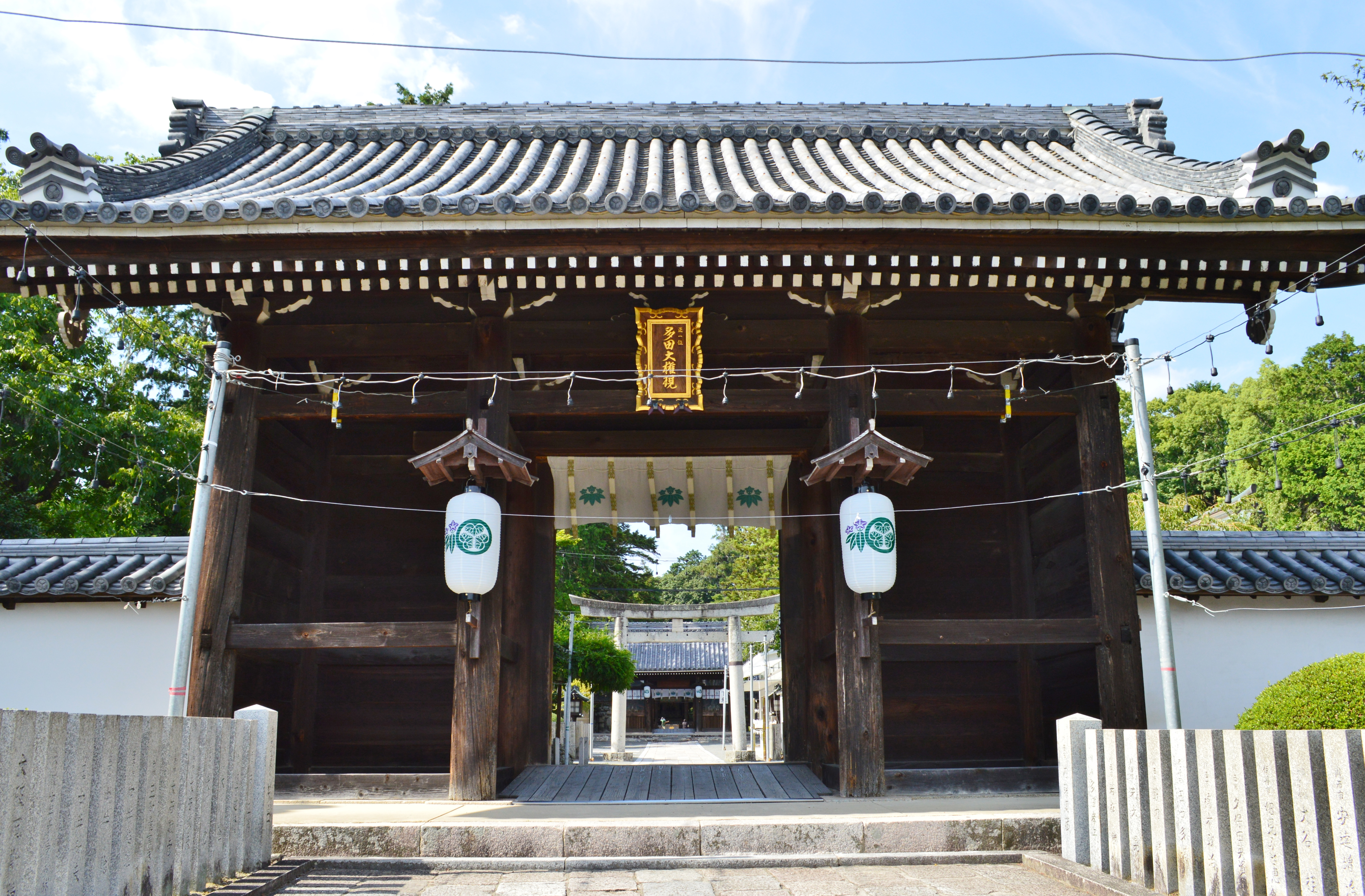
MInami Daimon (兵庫県指定文化財)

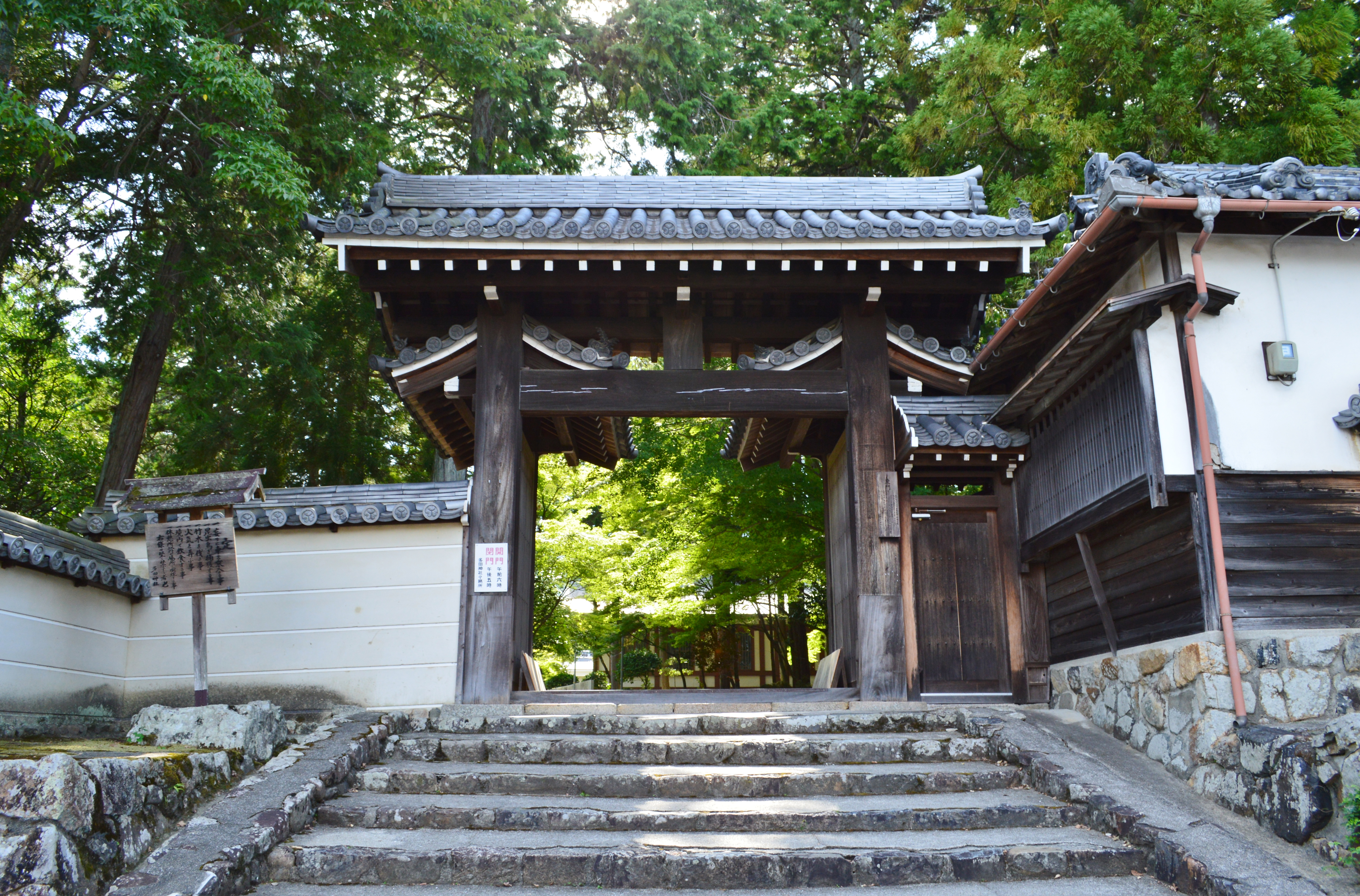
Higashi-mon (兵庫県指定文化財)

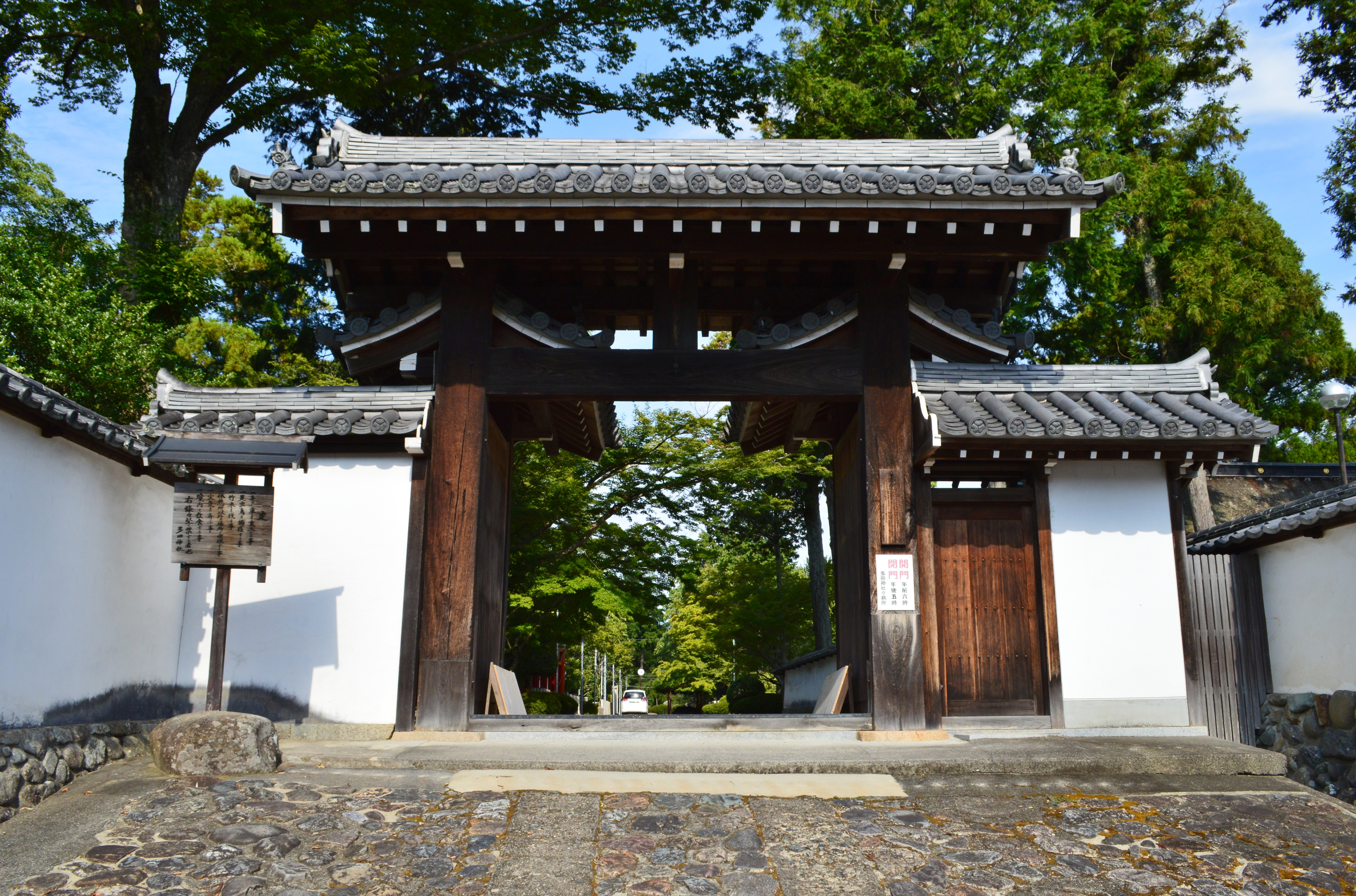
Nishi-mon (兵庫県指定文化財)

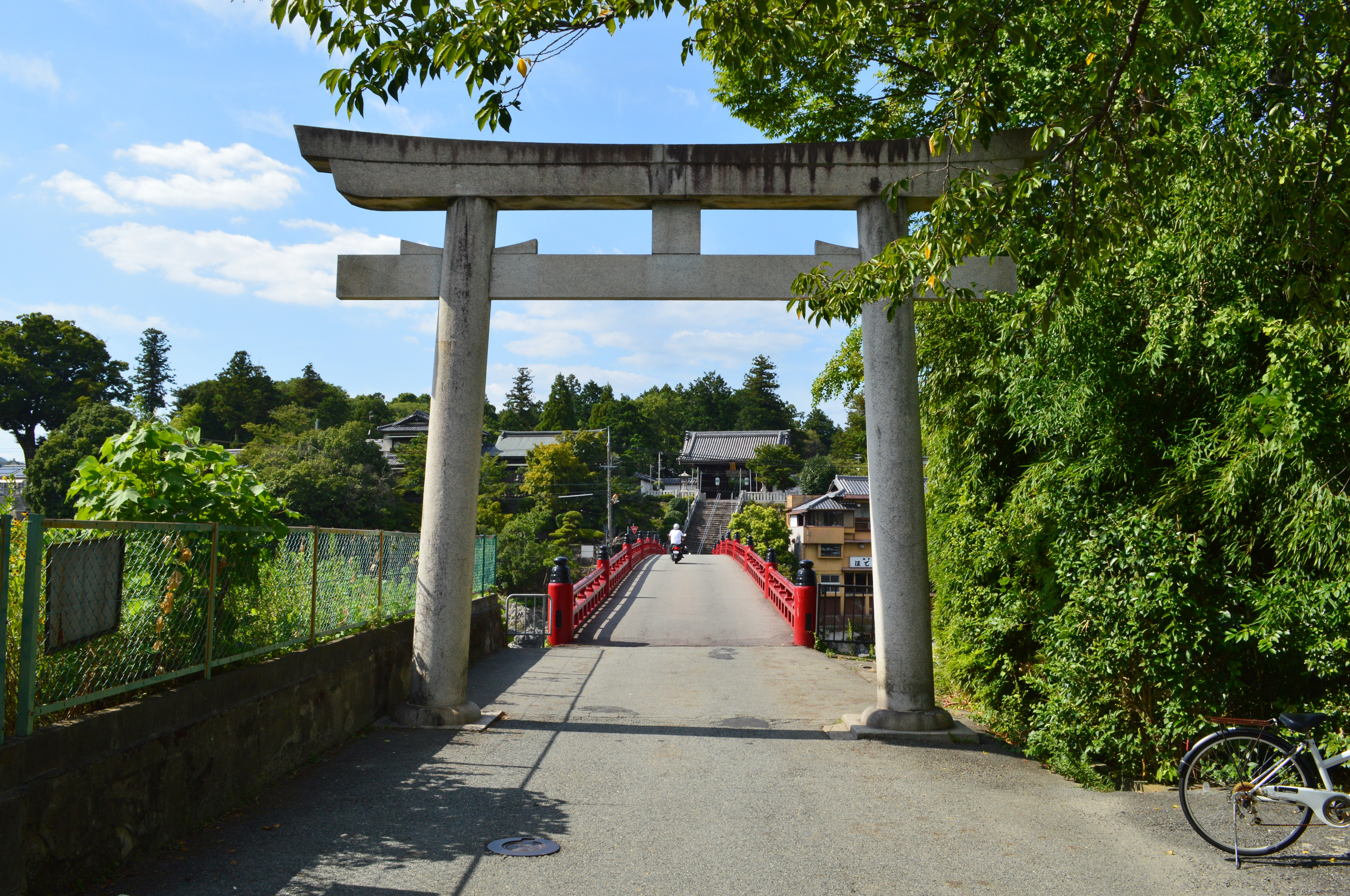
Ōtorii

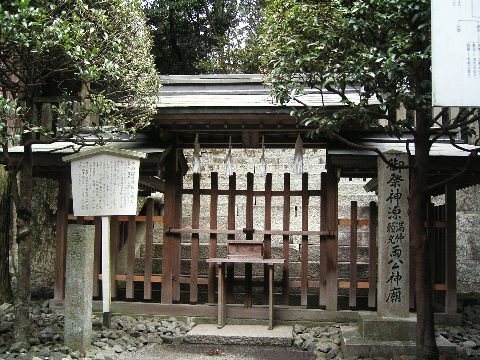
Grave of Minamoto no Yorimitsu

== Cultural Properties ==
=== Important Cultural Properties ===
- Tada Shrine Honden (多田神社 本殿), built in 1667
- Tada Shrine Haiden (多田神社 拝殿), built in 1667
- Tada Shrine Zuishimon (多田神社 随神門), built in 1667
- Tada Shrine Monjo (多田神社文書), 43 scrolls with 492 document

=== National Tangible Cultural Properties ===
- Tada Shrine Treasury (多田神社宝物殿), built in 1667

== See also ==
- List of Shinto shrines
- List of Historic Sites of Japan (Hyōgo)
