= Jūjō Station (Kyoto Municipal Subway) =

Metro station in Kyoto, Japan

Coordinates: 34°58′20″N 135°45′35″E

K13 Jujō Station 十条駅
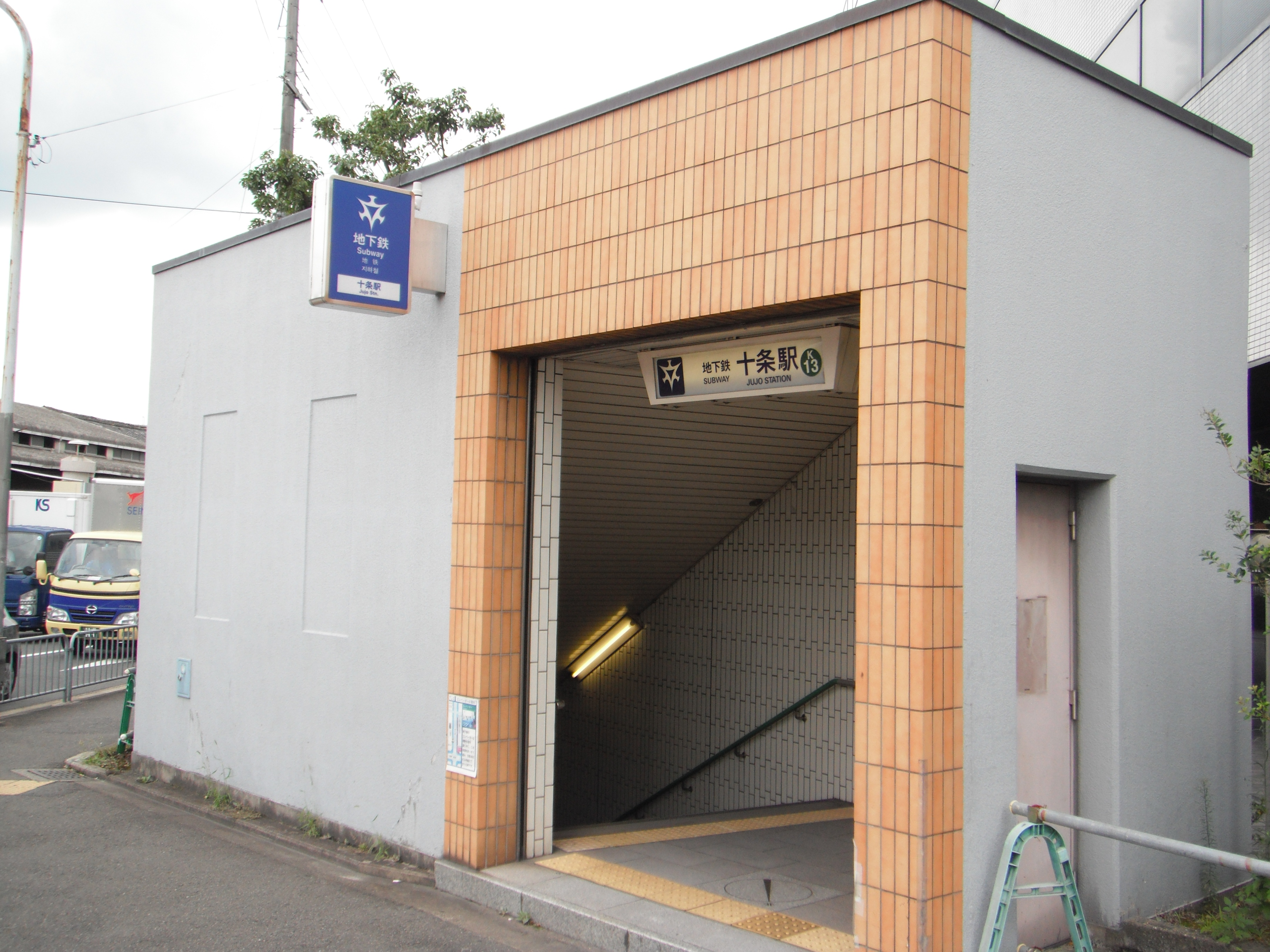

General information
- Location: Minami, Kyoto, Kyoto; Japan
- Operator: Kyoto Municipal Subway
- Line: Karasuma Line
- Platforms: 1 island platform
- Tracks: 2

Other information
- Station code: K13

History
- Opened: 11 June 1988; 38 years ago

Passengers
- FY2016: 7,184 daily

Services
Preceding station	Kyoto Municipal Subway	Following station
Kuinabashi K14 towards Takeda	Karasuma Line	Kujō K12 towards Kokusaikaikan
Location

Jūjō Station (十条駅, Jūjō-eki) is a train station on the Kyoto Municipal Subway Karasuma Line in Minami-ku, Kyoto, Japan.

== Lines ==
- Kyoto Municipal Subway
  - Karasuma Line (Station Number: K13)

== Layout ==
The station has one underground island platform with two tracks.

== Surrounding area ==
Nintendo Co., Ltd. headquarters
