= Kujō Station =

Kujō Station (九条駅, Kujō-eki) is the name of several train stations in the Kansai region, Japan:

- Kujō Station (Nara), on the Kintetsu Kashihara Line in Yamatokōriyama, Nara
- Kujō Station (Kyoto), on the Kyoto Municipal Subway Karasuma Line in Kyoto
- Kujō Station (Osaka), on the Osaka Metro Chuo Line and the Hanshin Namba Line in Osaka
