= Three Genji Shrines =

Japanese Shinto shrines

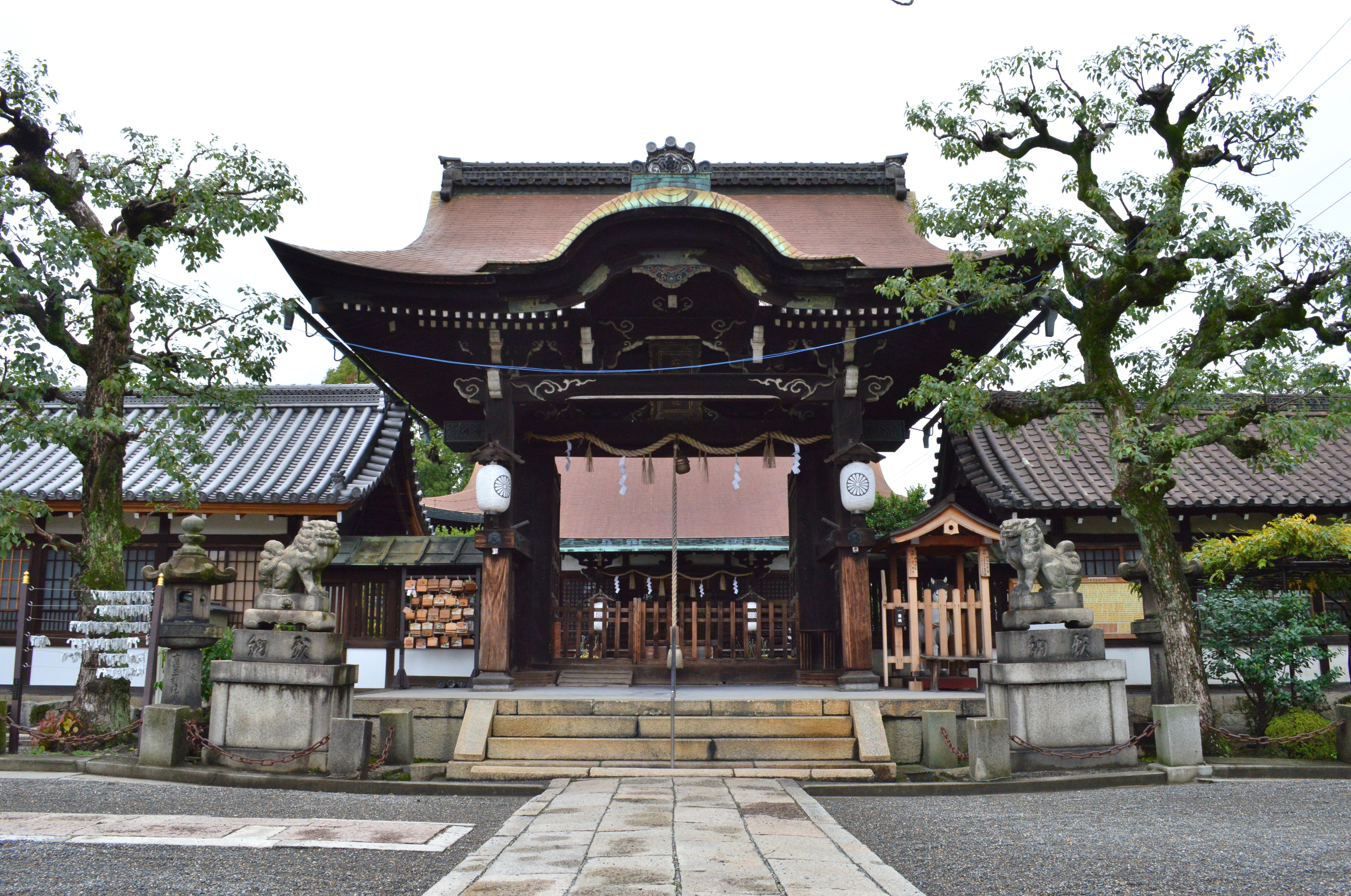
Rokusonnō Shrine

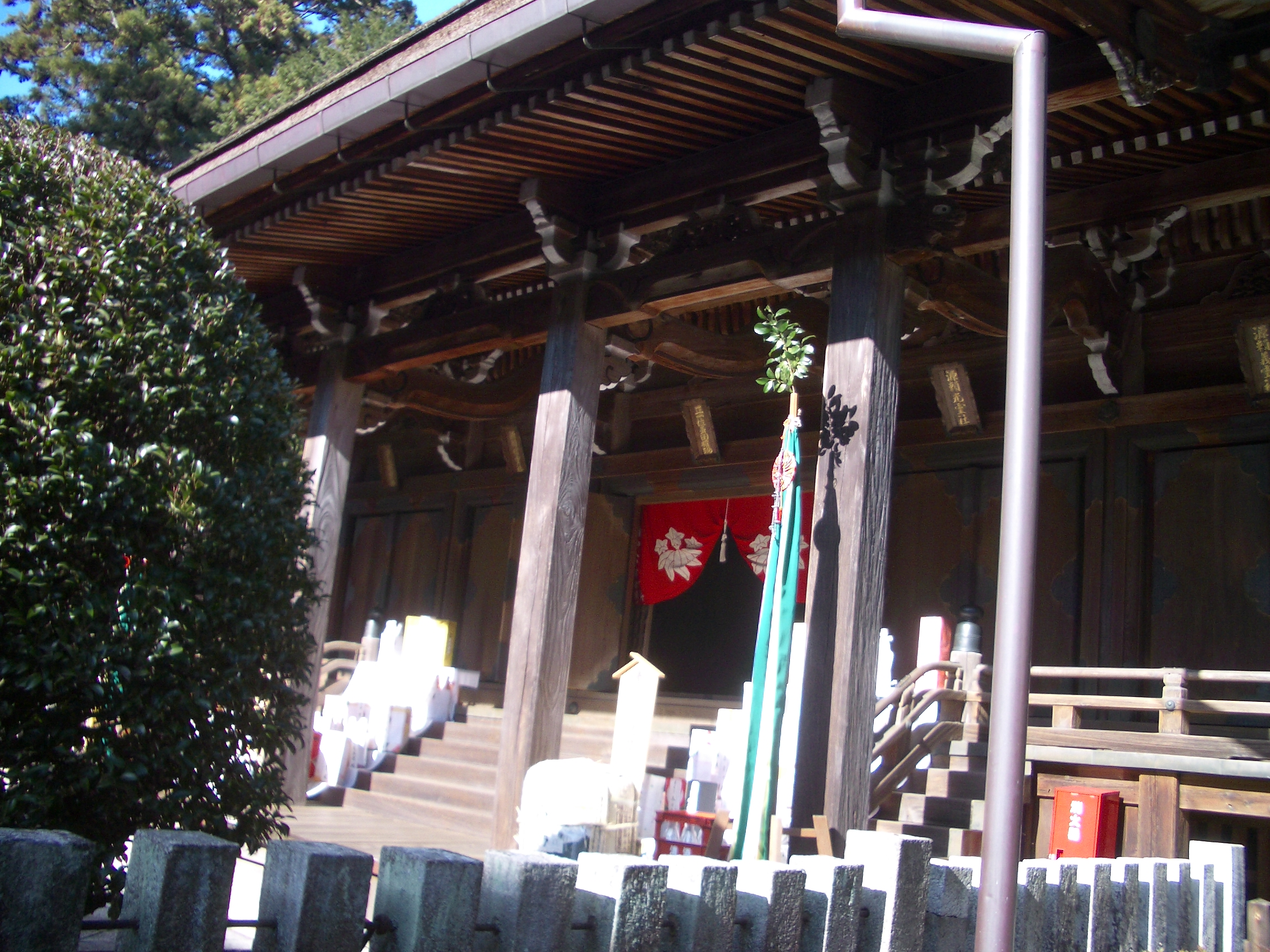
Tada Jinja

Three Genji Shrines (源氏三神社, Genji san jinja) are a group of three Japanese Shinto shrines connected with the Seiwa Genji group (the descent from Emperor Seiwa) of the Minamoto clan.

- Rokusonnō Shrine, Minami-ku, Kyoto, Kyoto Prefecture
- Tada Jinja, Kawanishi, Hyōgo Prefecture
- Tsuboi Hachimangū, Habikino, Osaka Prefecture
