= Kujō Station (Kyoto) =

Metro station in Kyoto, Japan

Coordinates: 34°58′45″N 135°45′35″E

K12 Kujō Station 九条駅
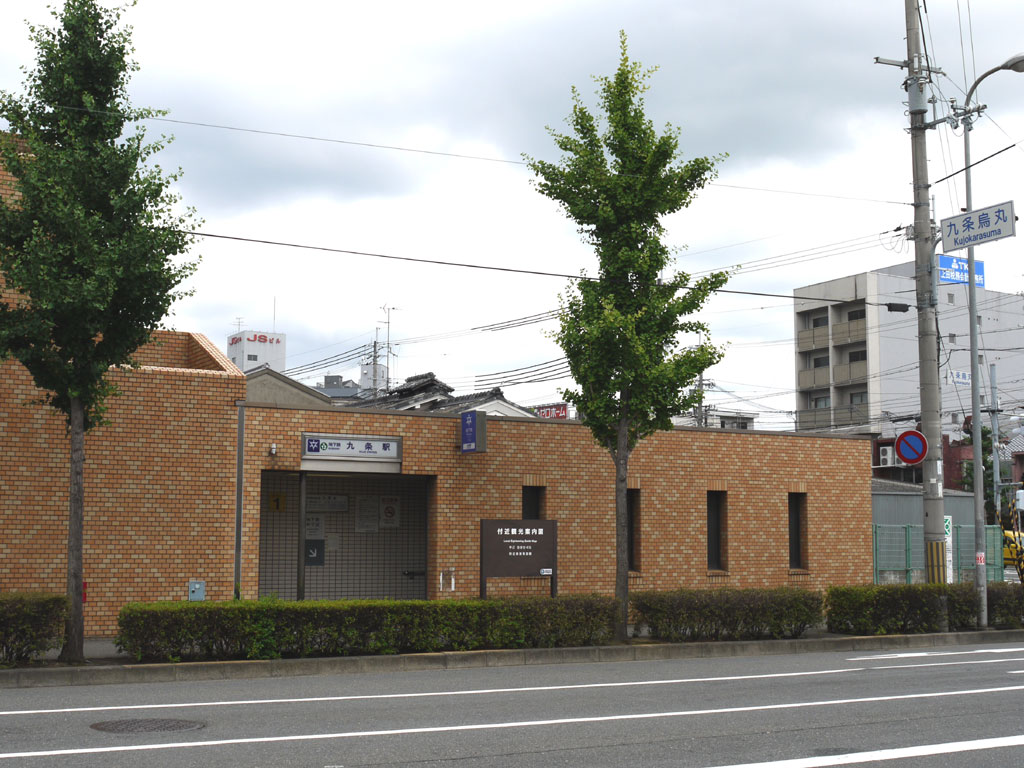
- Kujō Station entrance, June 2009

General information
- Location: Minami, Kyoto, Kyoto; Japan
- Operator: Kyoto Municipal Subway
- Line: Karasuma Line
- Platforms: 1 island platform
- Tracks: 2

Other information
- Station code: K12

History
- Opened: 11 June 1988; 38 years ago

Passengers
- 2025: 7,634 daily

Services
Preceding station	Kyoto Municipal Subway	Following station
Jūjō K13 towards Takeda	Karasuma Line	Kyoto K11 towards Kokusaikaikan
Location

Kujō Station (九条駅, Kujō-eki) is a subway station on the Karasuma Line in Minami-ku, Kyoto, Japan. The station sits at the intersection of Kujō Street and Karasuma Street. Kujō Station is one station south of Kyoto Station, the central hub of Kyoto. It was opened on 11 June 1988.

== Lines ==
- Kyoto Municipal Subway
  - Karasuma Line (Station Number: K12)

== Layout ==
The station has one underground island platform with two tracks.
