= Rokusonnō Shrine =

Shinto shrine in Kyoto Prefecture, Japan

Rokusonnō Shrine (六孫王神社)
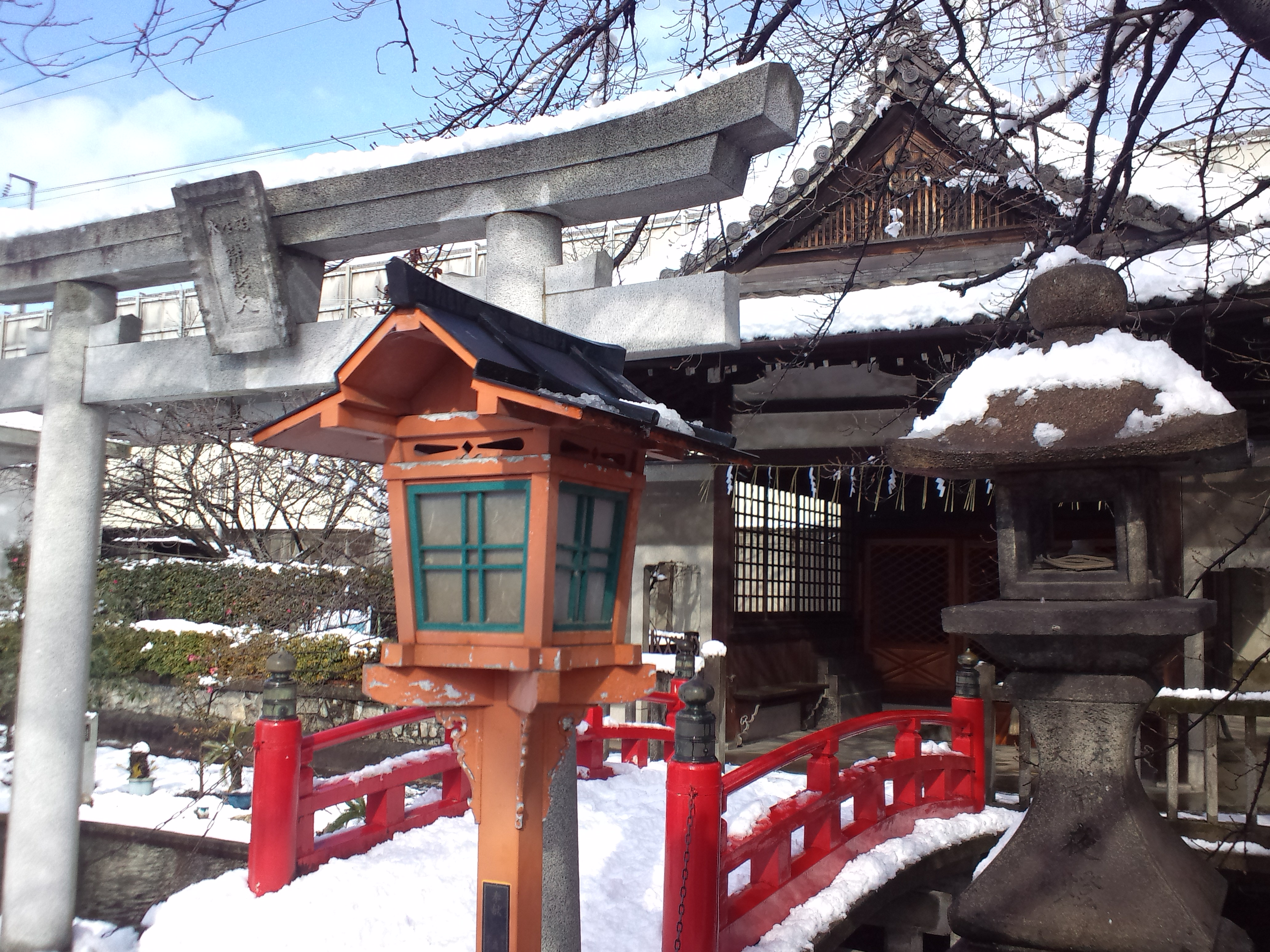
- Rokusonnō Shrine

- Location within Japan

Religion
- Affiliation: Shinto

Location
- Interactive map of Rokusonnō Shrine (六孫王神社)
- Coordinates: 34.9846°N 135.7449°E

Rokusonnō Shrine (六孫王神社) is a Shinto shrine located in Minami-ku, Kyoto, Kyoto Prefecture, Japan. It is one of the Three Genji Shrines, a group of three Japanese Shinto shrines connected with the Seiwa Genji group (the descent from Emperor Seiwa) of the Minamoto clan.

== See also ==
- Three Genji Shrines
