= Tsuboi Hachimangū =

Shrine in Habikino, Osaka Prefecture, Japan

Coordinates: 34°31′51″N 135°37′33″E

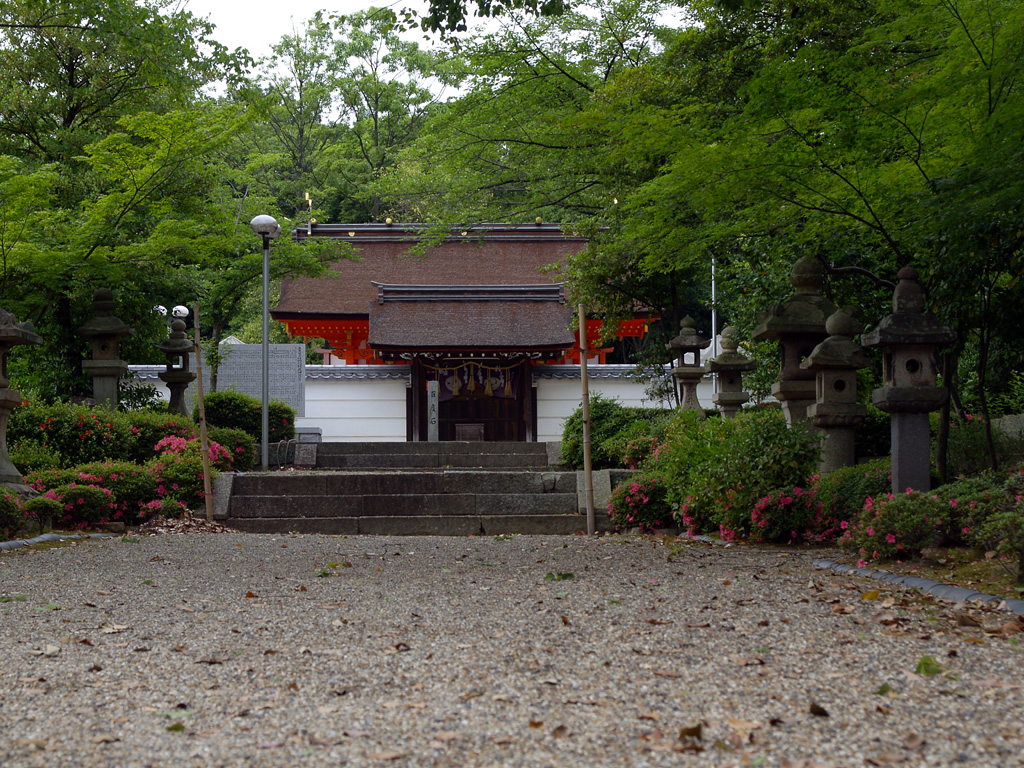

Tsuboi Hachimangū (壺井八幡宮, Tsuboi Hachimangū) is a Shinto shrine located in Habikino, Osaka Prefecture, Japan. It is a Hachiman shrine, dedicated to the kami Hachiman. It was established in 1063 by Minamoto no Yoriyoshi. Its main festival is held annually on May 15.

Tsuboi Hachimangū is one of the Three Genji Shrines (源氏三神社, Genji san jinja) a group of three shrines connected with the Seiwa Genji clan (with descent from Emperor Seiwa) of the Minamoto clan.

== See also ==
- List of Shinto shrines in Japan
- Hachiman shrine
