= Minami-ku, Kyoto =

Minami 南区
- Ward of Kyoto
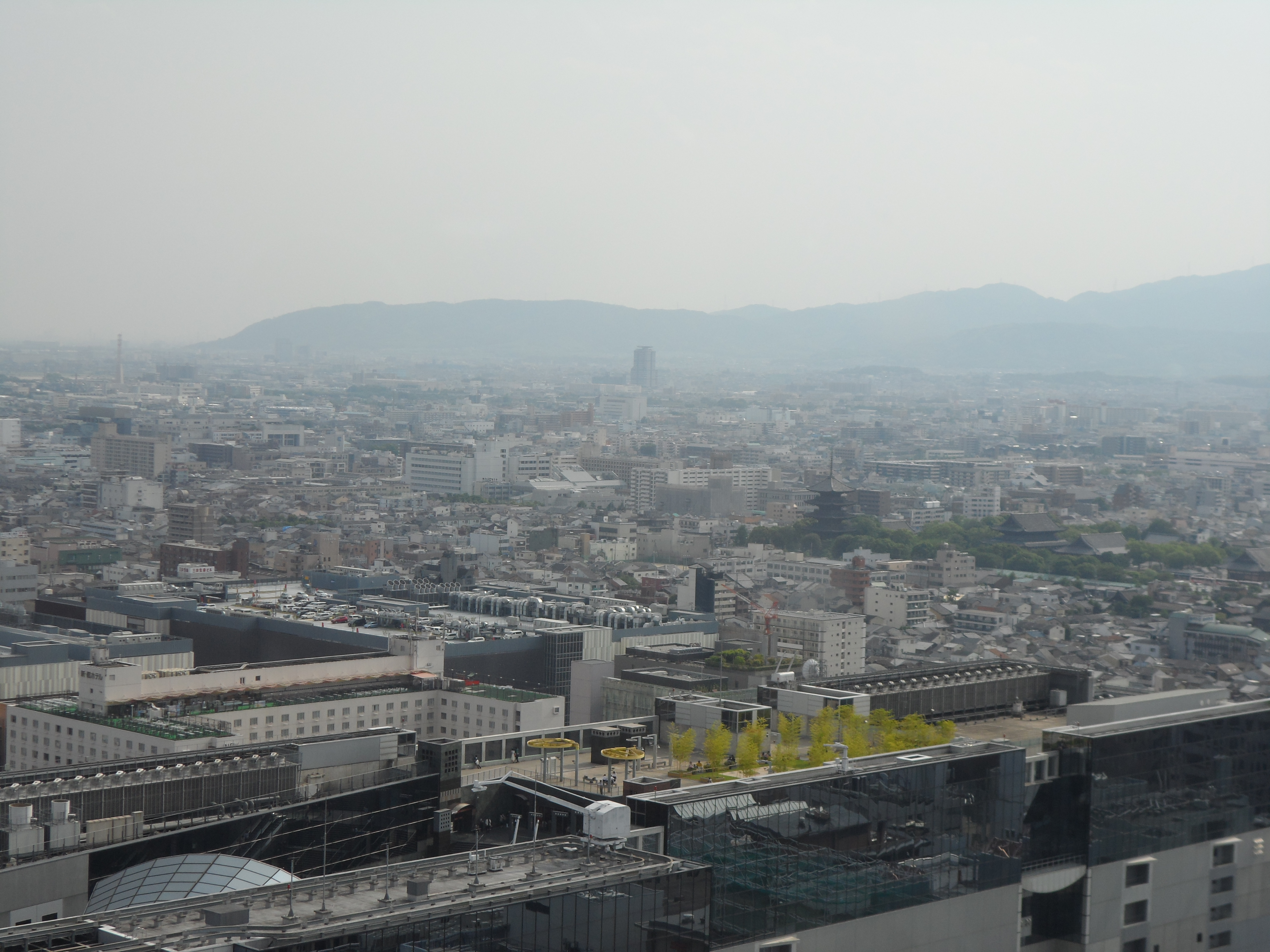

- Location of Minami-ku in Kyoto

- Location of Minami-ku in Japan
- Country: Japan
- Prefecture: Kyoto
- City: Kyoto
- Founded: 1955

Area
  - Total: 15.81 km^{2} (6.10 sq mi)
- Highest elevation: 28 m (92 ft)
- Lowest elevation: 14 m (46 ft)

Population (October 1, 2020)
  - Total: 101,970
  - Estimate (2021): 100,708
  - Density: 6,450/km^{2} (16,700/sq mi)
- Time zone: UTC+9 (Japan Standard Time)
- Website: www.city.kyoto.lg.jp/minami/

Minami (南区, Minami-ku) is one of the eleven wards in the city of Kyoto, in Kyoto Prefecture, Japan. Its name means "South Ward." It was established in 1955 when it was separated from Shimogyo-ku. As of April 2016, the ward has an estimated population of 100,781 people. The Kamo River and the Katsura River flow through the district. It is home to several historical places and temples.

Minami-ku is roughly bound on the east by the Kamo River, on the west by the Katsura River (although it extends over the Katsura River in some places), on the north by Hachijō Street and the JR Kyoto line (leading into Kyoto station), and on the south by the Meishin Expressway (although it extends over the expressway in some places).

The southern portion of Kyoto city (including Minami-ku) is sometimes referred to as Rakunan. This area is the only side of Kyoto not lined with mountains, a feature that historically made Rakunan important as a gateway into Kyoto.

Minami-ku is more working-class than some other Kyoto districts, and includes a large population of Korean nationals known as Zainichi Koreans. Instead of restaurants and clubs, portions of the land near the Kamo River are lined with factories and industrial buildings. Residential areas include both standard houses and apartments, and occasional government-subsidized housing projects.

The area around Kujo Street from around Toji station to the Kamo River is known as Higashi (east) Kujo. This area is particularly working-class, and home to a relatively large number of Korean nationals and other working class members of Japanese society. As such, it has been called "Kyoto's only international town".

Minami-ku has few notable areas of tourist interest compared to other parts of Kyoto. A notable exception is the To-ji Temple.

The Minami-ku ward office is located on Route 1, near its intersection with Kujō Street. The Kyoto City Disaster Prevention Center is also in Minami-ku, near the intersection of Route 1 and Jujō Street.

To the east of Minami-ku is Higashiyama-ku, and to the southeast is Fushimi-ku.

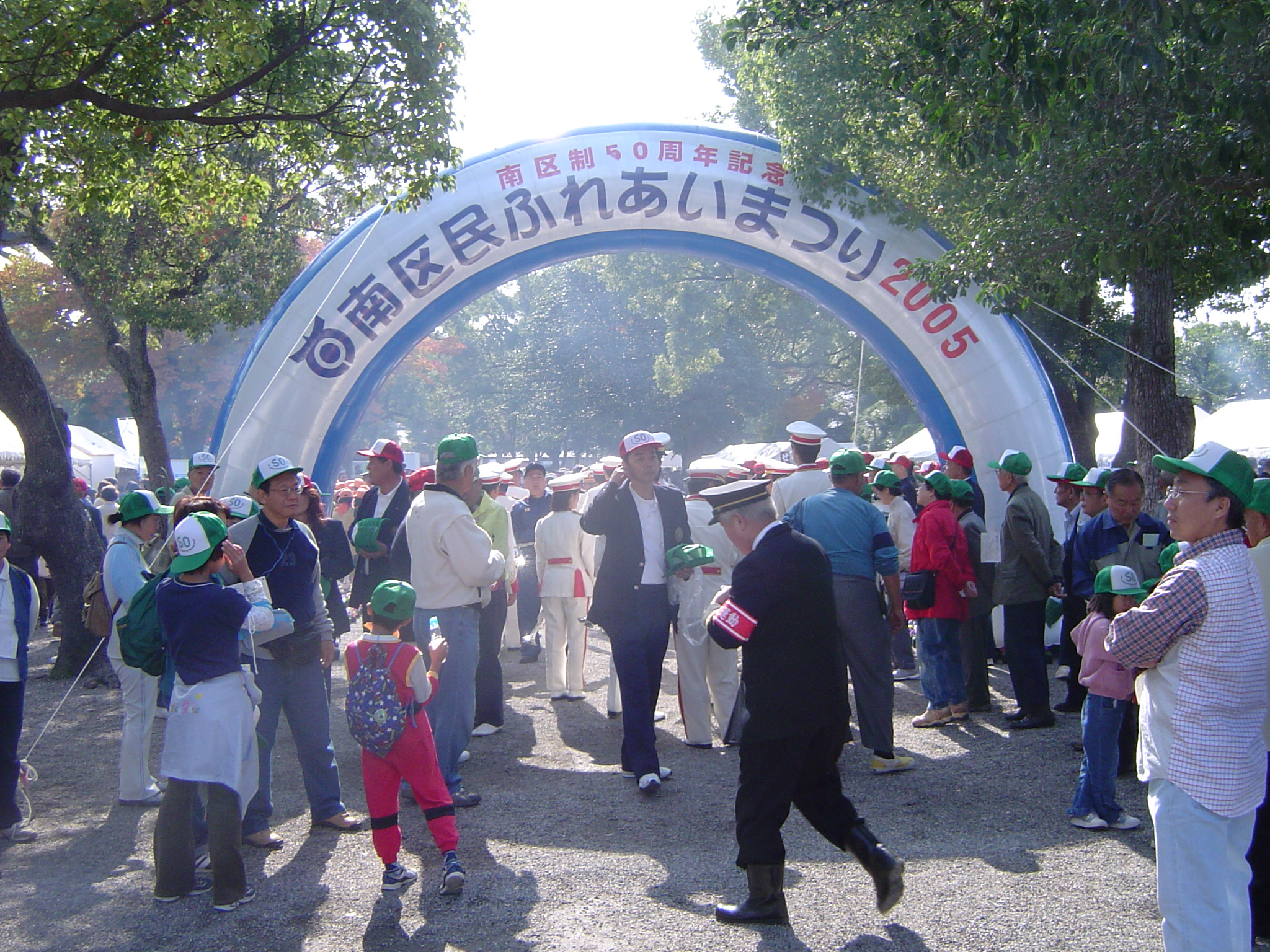
The 50th anniversary celebration of Minami-ku on the To-ji temple grounds

== Demographics ==
Historical population
Year	Pop.	±%
1960	104,918	—
1970	108,200	+3.1%
1980	101,713	−6.0%
1990	98,962	−2.7%
2000	97,820	−1.2%
2010	98,744	+0.9%
2020	101,970	+3.3%

== Temples and landmarks ==
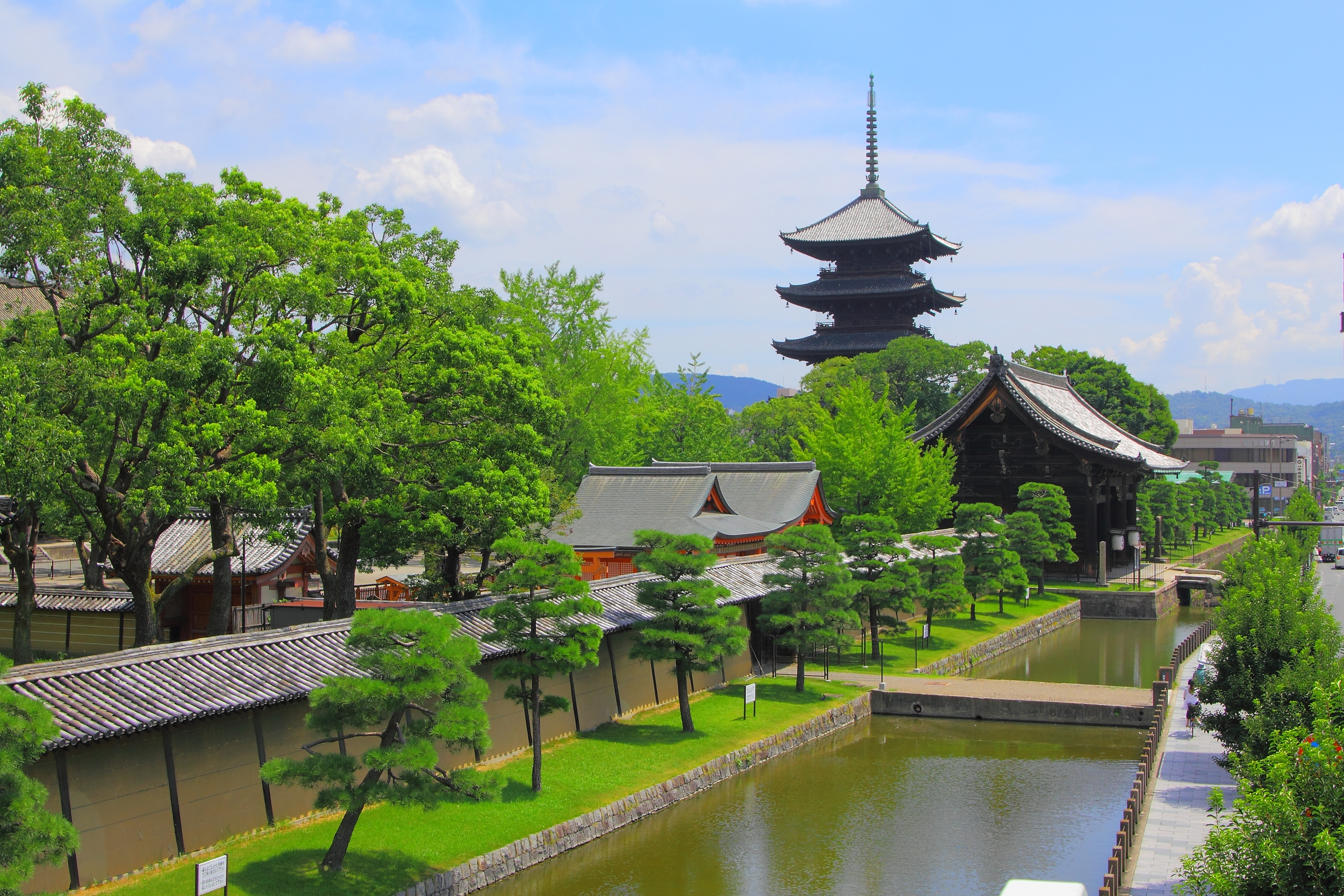
Tō-ji is one of the most famous landmarks of Minami-ku.

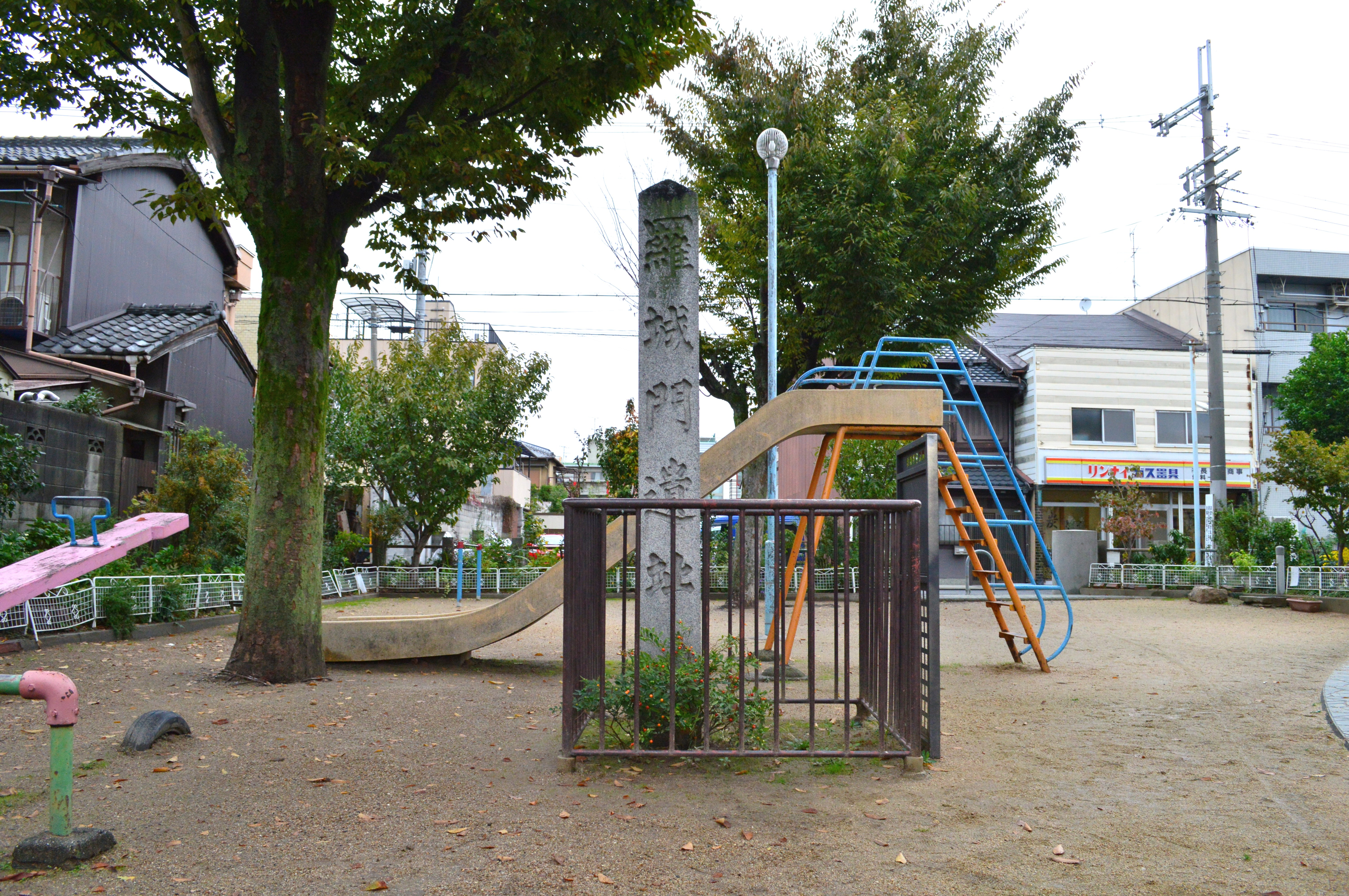
This stone marks the location of the former Rashōmon, the gate immortalized in the Akira Kurosawa film.

- Tō-ji a famous Buddhist temple with strong associations to the Buddhist priest Kūkai
- Former site of the Rashomon Gate, the old Southern entrance to the city
- Rokusonnō Shrine, one of the Three Genji Shrines

== Economy ==
The following companies have their headquarters in Minami:

- the home office of international company Nintendo is near the aforementioned intersection.
- Horiba, a global manufacturer of precision instruments for measurement and analysis
- Nidec, a global electric motor and electronic and optical components company
- Wacoal, a manufacturer of women's lingerie and underwear
- GS Yuasa, a manufacturer of batteries

== Education ==
- Kyoto Computer Gakuin
- Shuchiin University - A private Buddhist university tied to the Shingon Sect.
- Kyoto Chuokangohoken University - Vocational university focused on healthcare training and nursing.
- Amuse Beauty School - Vocational school focused on cosmetology, hairdressing, and aesthetics.

The community previously had a North Korean school, Kyoto Korean No. 1 Elementary School (京都朝鮮第一初級学校).
