= Oike Street =

Street in Kyoto city, Japan

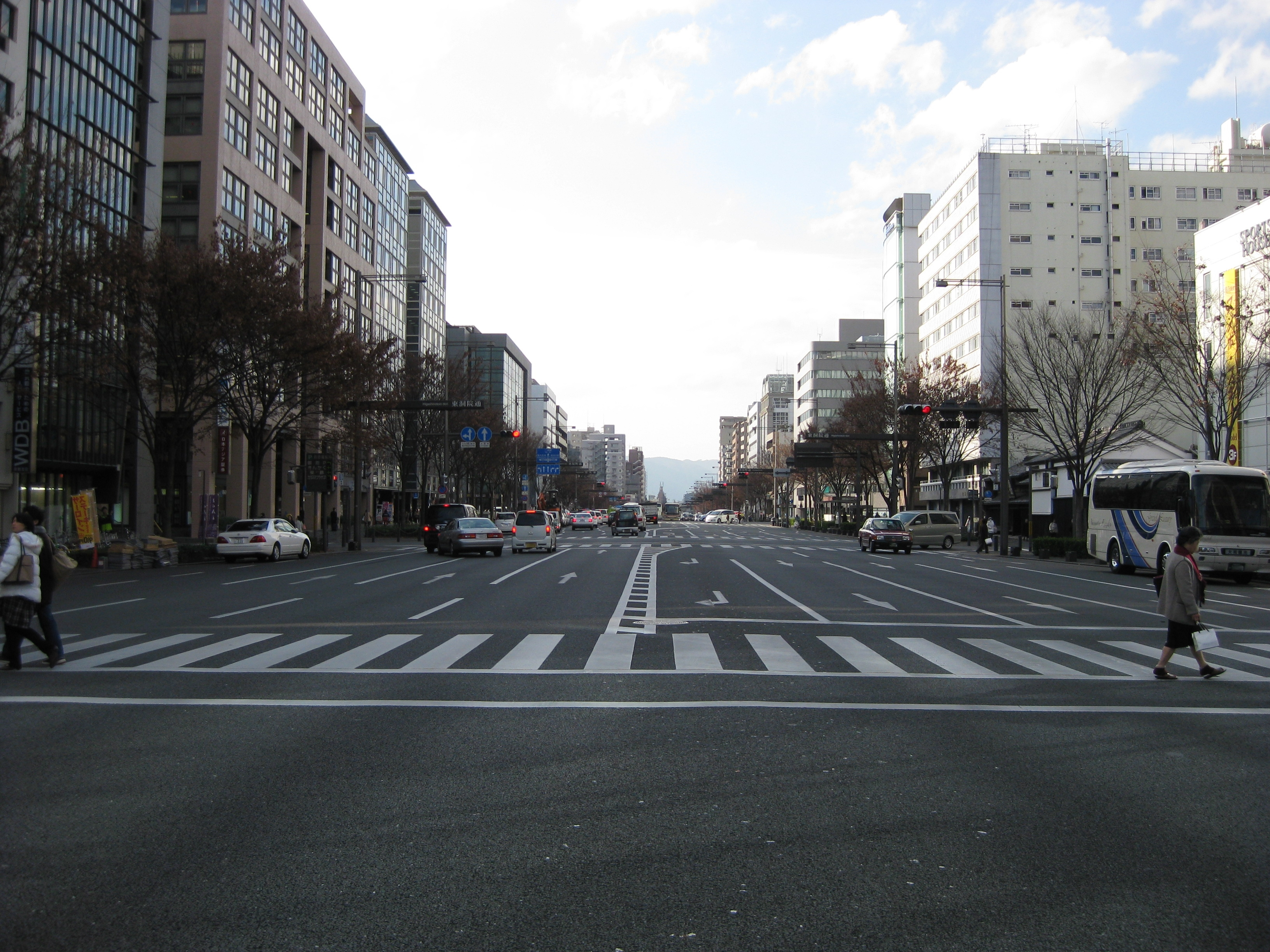
Looking east towards the Karasuma Oike intersection.

Oike Street (御池通 おいけどおり Oike Dōri) is a major street that crosses the center of the city of Kyoto from east to west, running approximately 4.9 km from Kawabata Street (east) to Tenjingawa Street (west).

== History ==
During the period of the Heian-kyō, it was a narrow street known as Sanjō Bonmon Koji (三条坊門小路). From the mid Edo period the street began to be known as Oike, due to the fact that in the past it passed by a large pond (池 ike) contained inside the then larger Shinsenen. In 1945 during WW2, in the section between the west side of the Kamo River and Horikawa Street, houses and buildings were removed to create a firewall, making the street considerably wider. After 1947, due to the urban planning policy of the city, it was decided to maintain a width of 50 meters for this section.

== Present Day ==
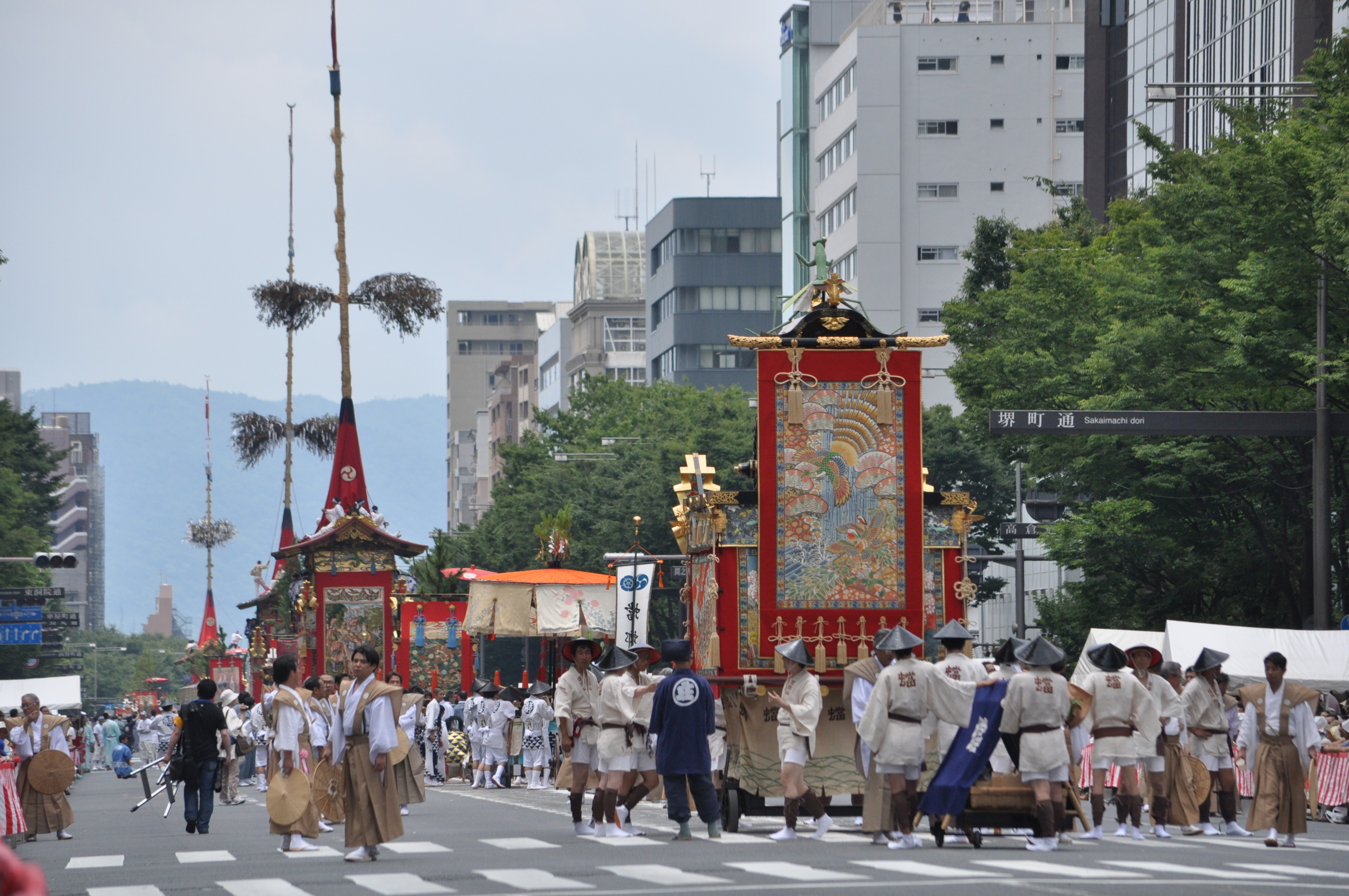
Yamaboko Junkō procession of the Gion Matsuri.

Nowadays the section between Kawabata Street and Horikawa Street is the widest street in the city of Kyoto. This section is on the route of the Yamaboko Junkō parade of the Gion Matsuri and on the route of the parade of the Jidai Matsuri. Several subway stations of the Tōzai Line are located along this segment, as well as several relevant public facilities such as the Kyoto City Hall and Zest Oike, making it an important public space. For this reason, in the year 2003 after an extensive infrastructure improvement project, this section was designated as "Symbol Road" by the city of Kyoto.

== Relevant landmarks along the Street ==
- Kamo River
- Kyoto Hotel Okura
- Kyoto City Hall.
- Zest Oike
- Honnō-ji temple
- Hello Work Karasuma Oike Plaza
- Nichicon Corporation
- Nijō Castle
- Shinsenen Garden
- Shimadzu Corporation Sanjō Factory

=== Train Stations ===
==== Subway ====
- Kyoto Shiyakusho-mae Station
- Karasuma Oike Station
- Nijōjō-mae Station
- Nishiōji Oike Station
- Uzumasa Tenjingawa Station

==== JR San'in Main Line ====
- Nijō Station

== Links ==
- Kyoto Hotel Okura
- Zest Oike
- Nichicon Corporation
- Shimadzu Corporation
