= Nijō Station (Kyoto) =

Railway and metro station in Kyoto, Japan

Nijō Station 二条駅
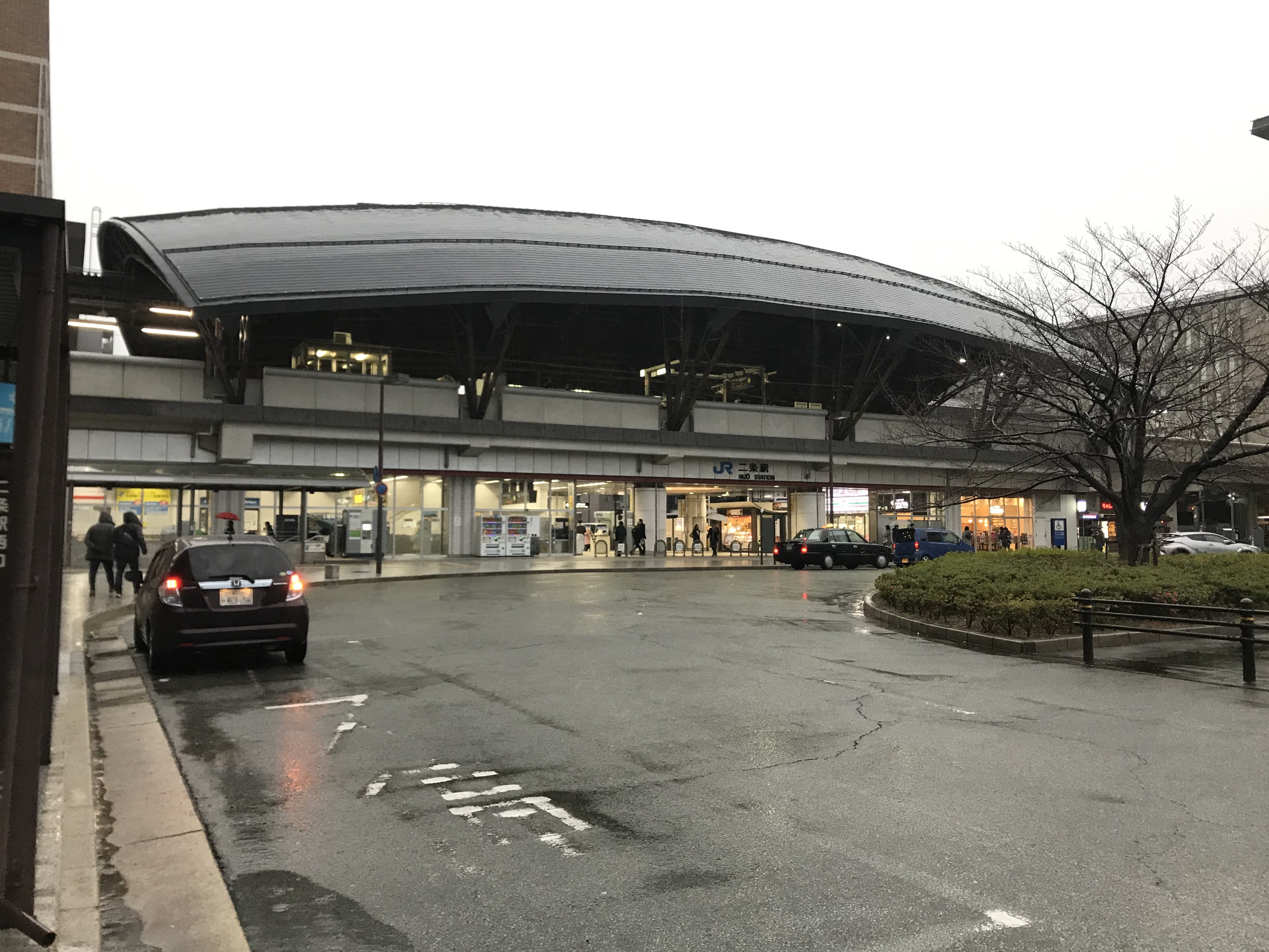
- Nijō Station, February 2019

General information
- Location: Nishinokyo Toganoocho, Nakagyō, Kyoto, Kyoto （京都市中京区西ノ京栂尾町） Japan
- Operator: JR West; Kyoto Municipal Subway
- Connections: Bus terminal

Other information
- Station code: T15

History
- Opened: 15 February 1897; 129 years ago
Location

Nijō Station (二条駅, Nijō-eki) is a train station in Nakagyō-ku, Kyoto, Japan.

== Lines ==
- JR West
  - Sagano Line (Sanin Main Line)
- Kyoto Municipal Subway
  - Tōzai Line (Station Number: T15)

== Layout ==
=== JR West ===
Nijō Station 二条駅
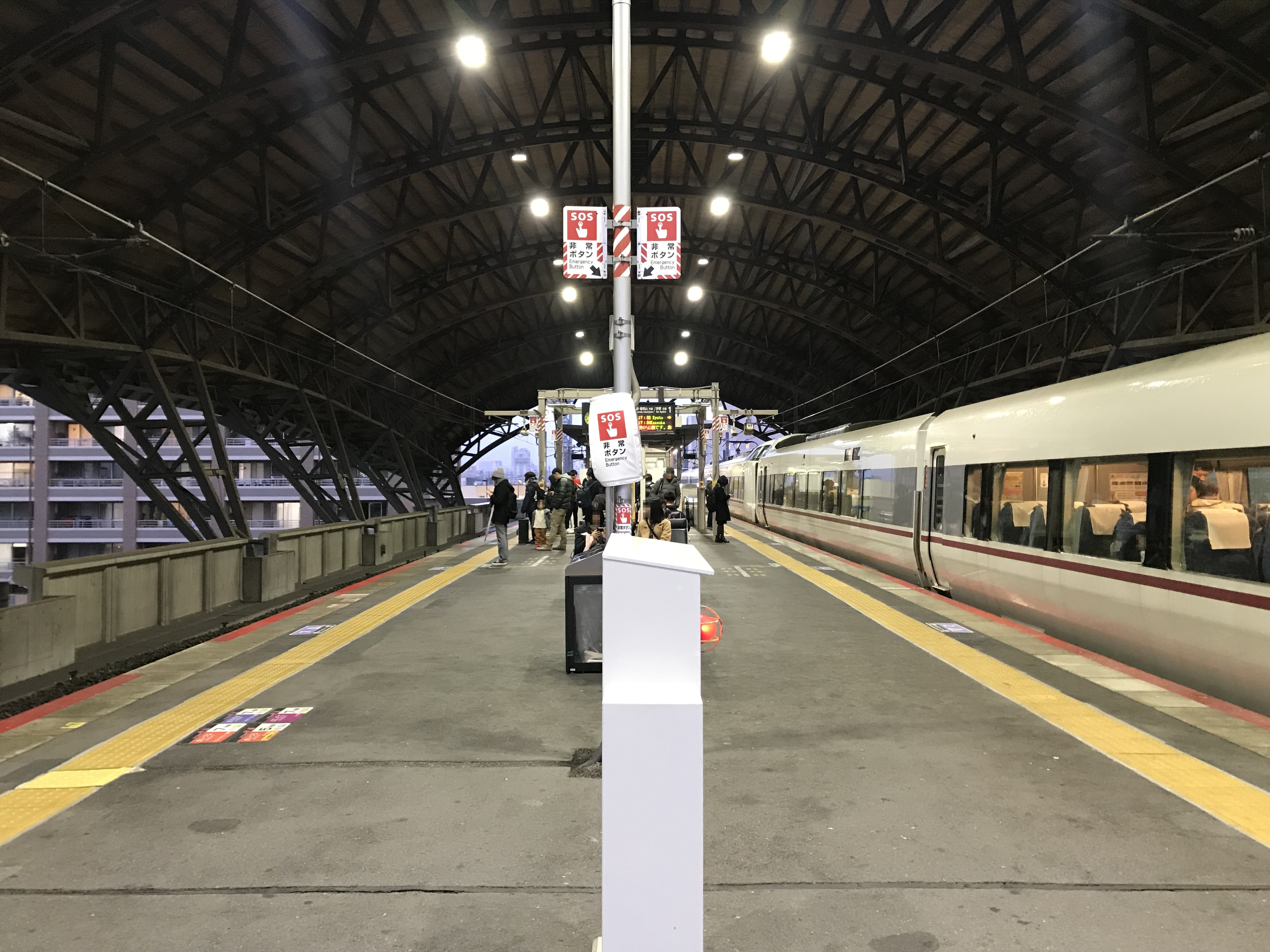
- Nijō Station platforms, February 2019

General information
- Location: 3, Nishinokyo Toganoocho, Nakagyō, Kyoto, Kyoto （京都市中京区西ノ京栂尾町3） Japan
- Coordinates: 35°0′39.51″N 135°44′30.1″E
- System: JR West station
- Operator: JR West
- Line: Sanin Main Line (Sagano Line)
- Platforms: 1 Island platform
- Tracks: 2

Construction
- Structure type: Elevated
- Accessible: Yes

Other information
- Station code: JR-E04

History
- Opened: 15 February 1897; 129 years ago

Passengers
- FY 2023: 25,938 daily

Services
Preceding station	JR West	Following station
Emmachi towards Sonobe	Sagano Line Rapid	Kyoto Terminus
Emmachi towards Sonobe	Sagano Line Local	Tambaguchi towards Kyoto
Kameoka towards Kinosaki Onsen	Sagano Line Kinosaki	Kyoto Terminus
Kameoka towards Higashi-Maizuru	Sagano Line Maizuru	Kyoto Terminus
Kameoka towards Toyooka	Sagano Line Hashidate	Kyoto Terminus
Location

The station has one elevated island platform between two tracks. The station building was designed by Urabesekkei, an architectural firm based in Osaka. Prior to the platform elevation, the station was only accessible from the east (Sembon Street side), but the station renovation made it accessible from both the east and west sides.

The design elements of the former station building were evocative of nearby Nijō Castle. The building was dismantled and rebuilt at the Kyoto Railway Museum (then called the Umekoji Steam Locomotive Museum) in 1996.

1	■ Sagano Line	for Kyoto
2	■ Sagano Line	for Kameoka, Sonobe and Fukuchiyama

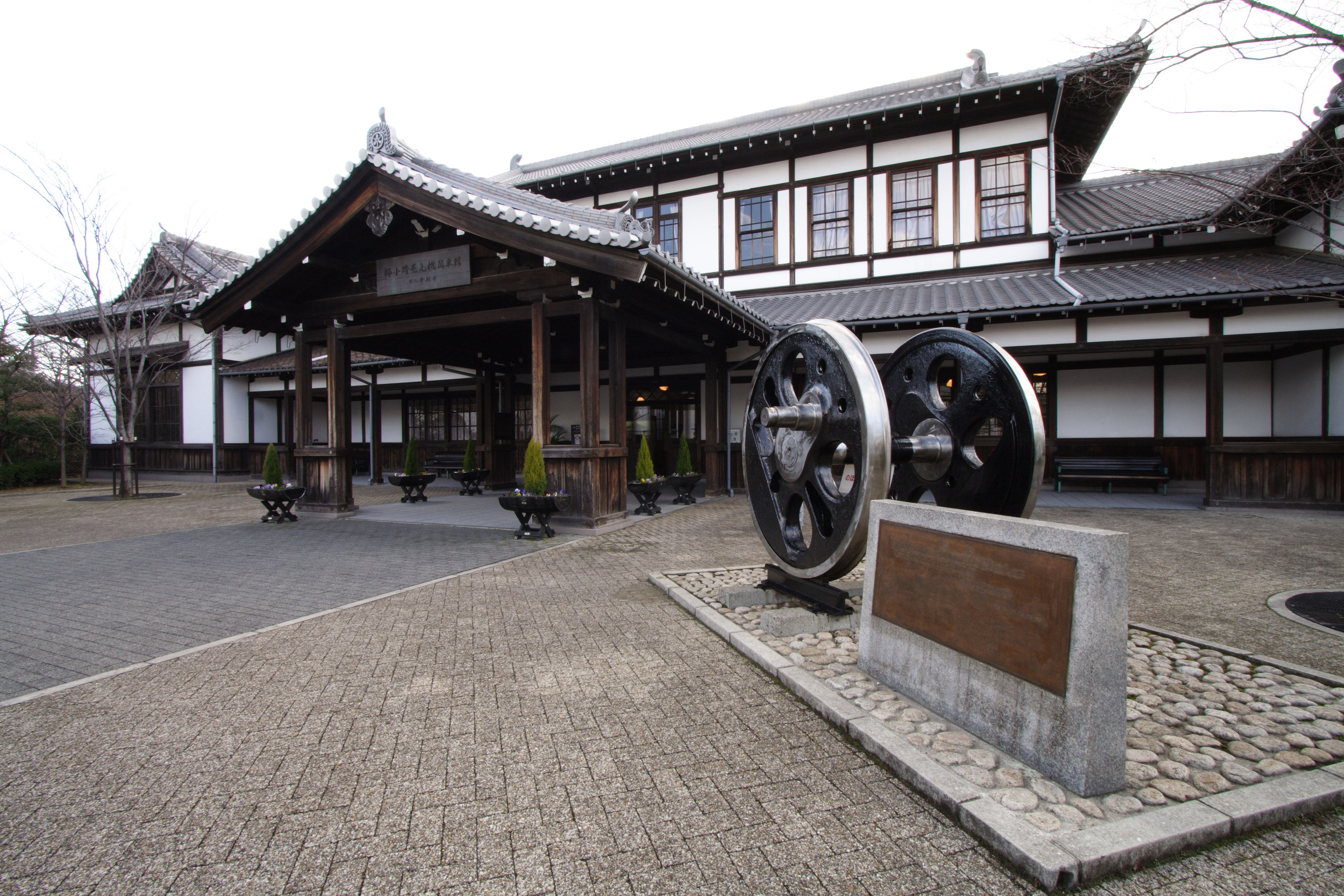
Former Nijō Station building now at Kyoto Railway Museum

=== Kyoto Subway ===
T15 Nijō Station 二条駅
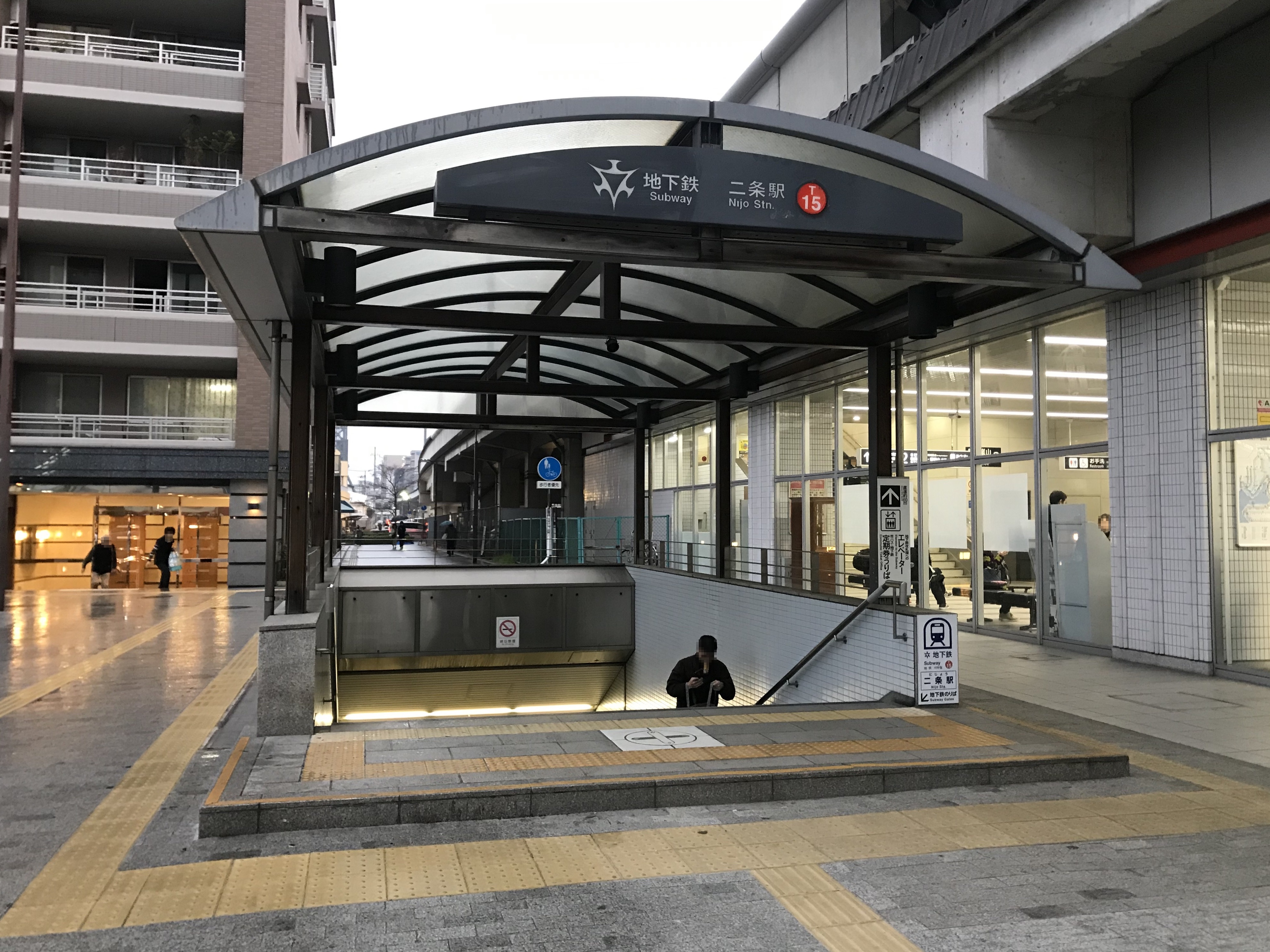
- Station entrance, February 2019

General information
- Location: 3, Nishinokyo Toganoocho, Nakagyō, Kyoto, Kyoto （京都市中京区西ノ京栂尾町3） Japan
- Coordinates: 35°0′42.76″N 135°44′28.73″E
- System: Kyoto Municipal Subway station
- Operator: Kyoto Municipal Subway
- Line: Tōzai Line
- Platforms: 1 island platform
- Tracks: 2

Construction
- Structure type: Underground

Other information
- Station code: T15

History
- Opened: 12 October 1997; 28 years ago

Passengers
- FY 2023: 20,408 daily

Services
Preceding station	Kyoto Municipal Subway	Following station
Nishiōji Oike T16 towards Uzumasa Tenjingawa	Tōzai Line	Nijōjō-mae T14 towards Rokujizō
Location

Subway station has one underground island platform with two tracks, separated by platform screen doors.

1	■ Tōzai Line	for Uzumasa Tenjingawa
2	■ Tōzai Line	for Karasuma Oike, Rokujizō and Hamaotsu

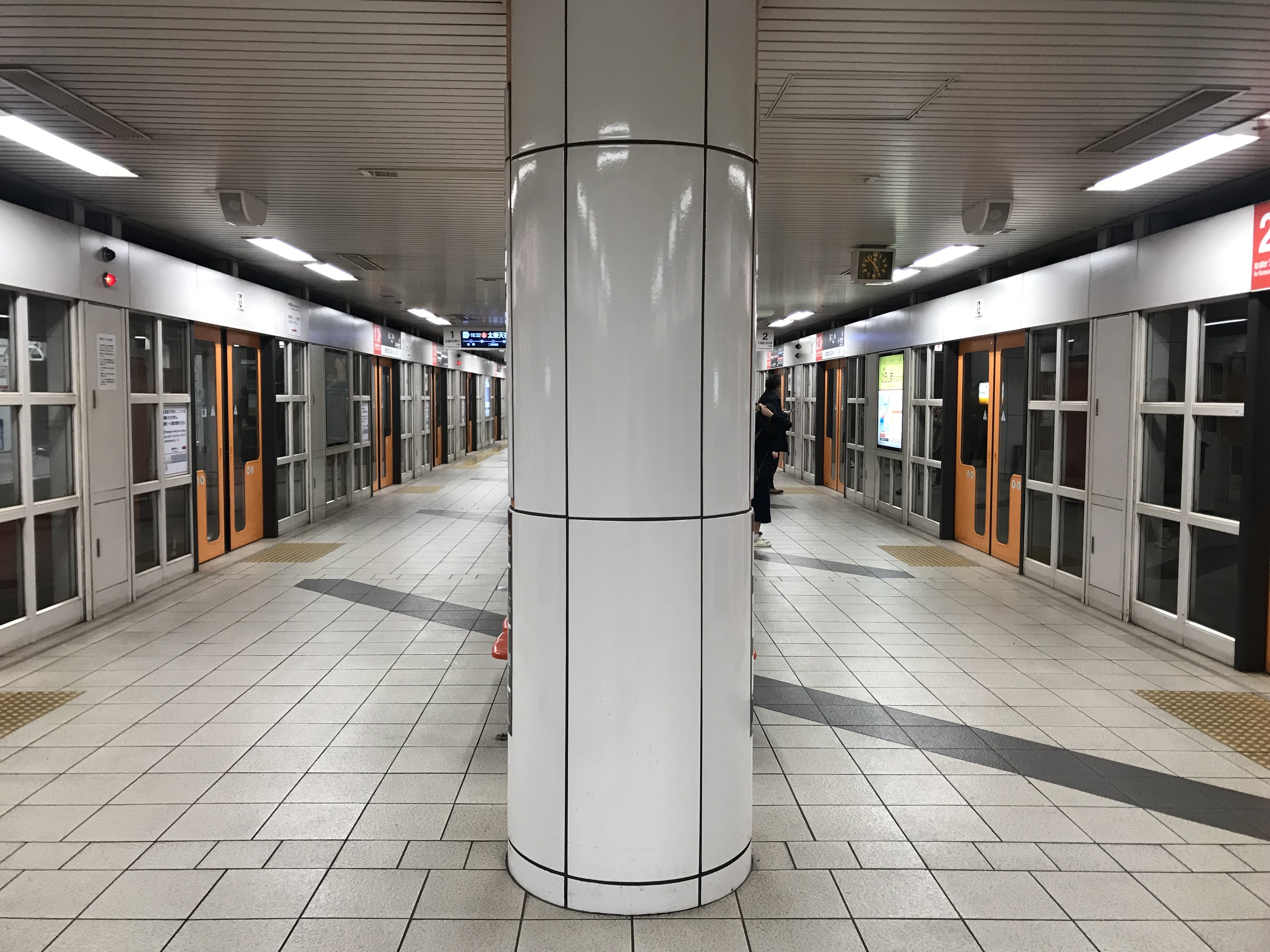
Tōzai Line platforms

== History ==
Nijō Station opened on 15 February 1897 and was the terminus of the Kyoto Railway (present-day San'in Main Line) until 27 April of the same year. The original station building was moved to its current location at the Kyoto Railway Museum on 1 April 1996. The Tōzai Line subway opened on 12 October 1997. The Tōzai line was extended to the Uzumasa Tenjingawa Station on 16 January 2008.

Station numbering was introduced to the JR West platforms in March 2018 with Nijō being assigned station number JR-E04.

== Ridership ==
Daily Average, Nijō Subway Station
Year	Boarding Passengers	Arriving Passengers	Total
2013	8,802	8,364	17,166
2014	9,202	8,745	17,947
2015	9,624	9,143	18,767
2016	9,985	9,486	19,471
2017	10,281	9,767	20,048

== Surrounding area ==
=== East Side ===
The Shinsenen and the Nijō Castle are within walking distance, however in case of traveling via subway, the adjacent station of Nijōjō-mae is closer.

- Ritsumeikan University Nijō Campus.
- Bukkyo University Nijō Campus.
- Senbon Street
- Life Supermarket Nijo Station Store

=== West Side ===
- BiVi Nijō.

== Buses ==
=== Nijo-eki-nishiguchi ===
Kyoto City Bus
- Route 66 for Katsura-eki-higashiguchi
Airport limousine
- for Osaka International Airport (Osaka Airport Transport Co., Ltd.)
- for Kansai International Airport (Kansai Airport Transportation Enterprise Co., Ltd.)

=== Nijo-ekimae ===
Kyoto City Bus
- Route 6 for Shijo Omiya / for Bukkyo University and Gentaku
- Route 15 for Shijo Kawaramachi and Sanjo Keihan via Oike Street / for Emmachi and Ritsumeikan University
- Route 46 for Gion and Heian Shrine / for Kamigamo Shrine via Sembon Street
- Route 55 for Shijo Omiya and Shijo Karasuma / for Kitano Tenman-gu and Ritsumeikan University
- Route 66 for Katsura-eki-higashiguchi / for Nijo-eki-nishiguchi
- Route 201 for Mibu and Gion / for Sembon Imadegawa and Hyakuman-ben
- Route 206 for Nanajo Omiya and Kyoto Station / for Sembon Kitaoji and Kitaoji Bus Terminal
- Rapid buses for Bukkyo University / Rapid buses for Ritsumeikan University
Kyoto Bus Co., Ltd.
- Route 61 for Arashiyama and Daikaku-ji via Marutamachi Street and Kyoto Studio Park / for Sanjo Keihan via Shijo Kawaramachi
- Route 62 for Arashiyama and Kiyotaki via Marutamachi Street and Kyoto Studio Park / for Sanjo Keihan via Horikawa Oike (Nijo Castle), Karasuma Oike and Shijo Kawaramachi
- Route 63 for Arashiyama, Koke-dera and Suzumushi-dera via Marutamachi Street and Kyoto Studio Park / for Sanjo Keihan via Shijo Kawaramachi
- Route 65 for Arashiyama and Arisugawa via Marutamachi Street and Kyoto Studio Park
West JR Bus Company
- for Kyoto Station / for Toganoo and Shuzan
