= Senbon Street =

Street in Kyoto city, Japan

Senbon Street (千本通; せんぼんどお; Senbon dōri) is one of the major streets running from north to south in the city of Kyoto, Japan. It extends from the Takagamine area of the Kita-ku (north) to the vicinity of Nōso, in the Fushimi-ku (south).

== History ==
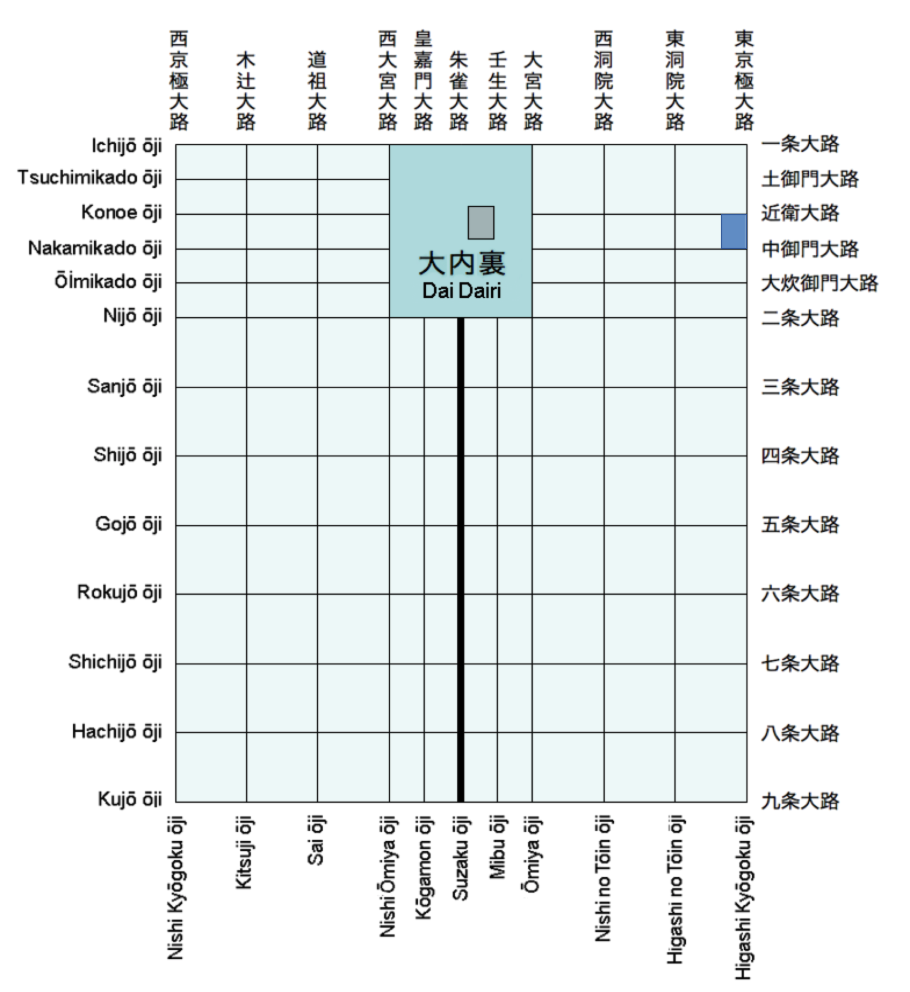
Suzaku Avenue of the Heian-kyō, shown in bold vertical line.

The section of present-day Senbon Street located between Nijō and Kujō streets corresponds to the Suzaku Avenue, the central and most important road of the ancient Heian-kyō, which was 84 meters wide and approximately 4 km long. Later, one thousand (千本 senbon) stupas were built as an offering and it is believed that because of this the current name of the street came to use.

== Relevant landmarks along the street ==
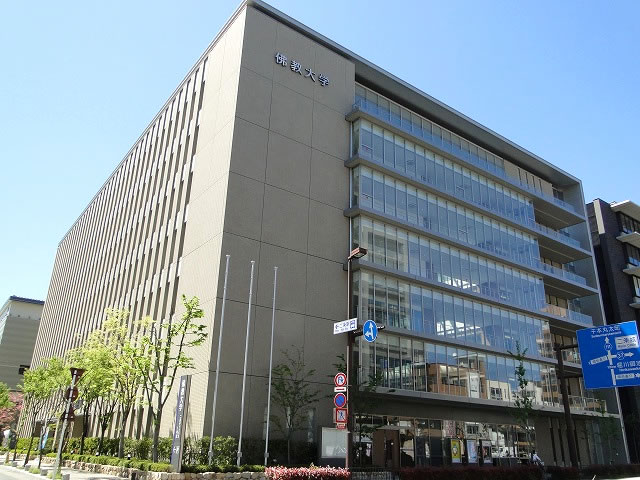
Bukkyo University Nijō Campus.

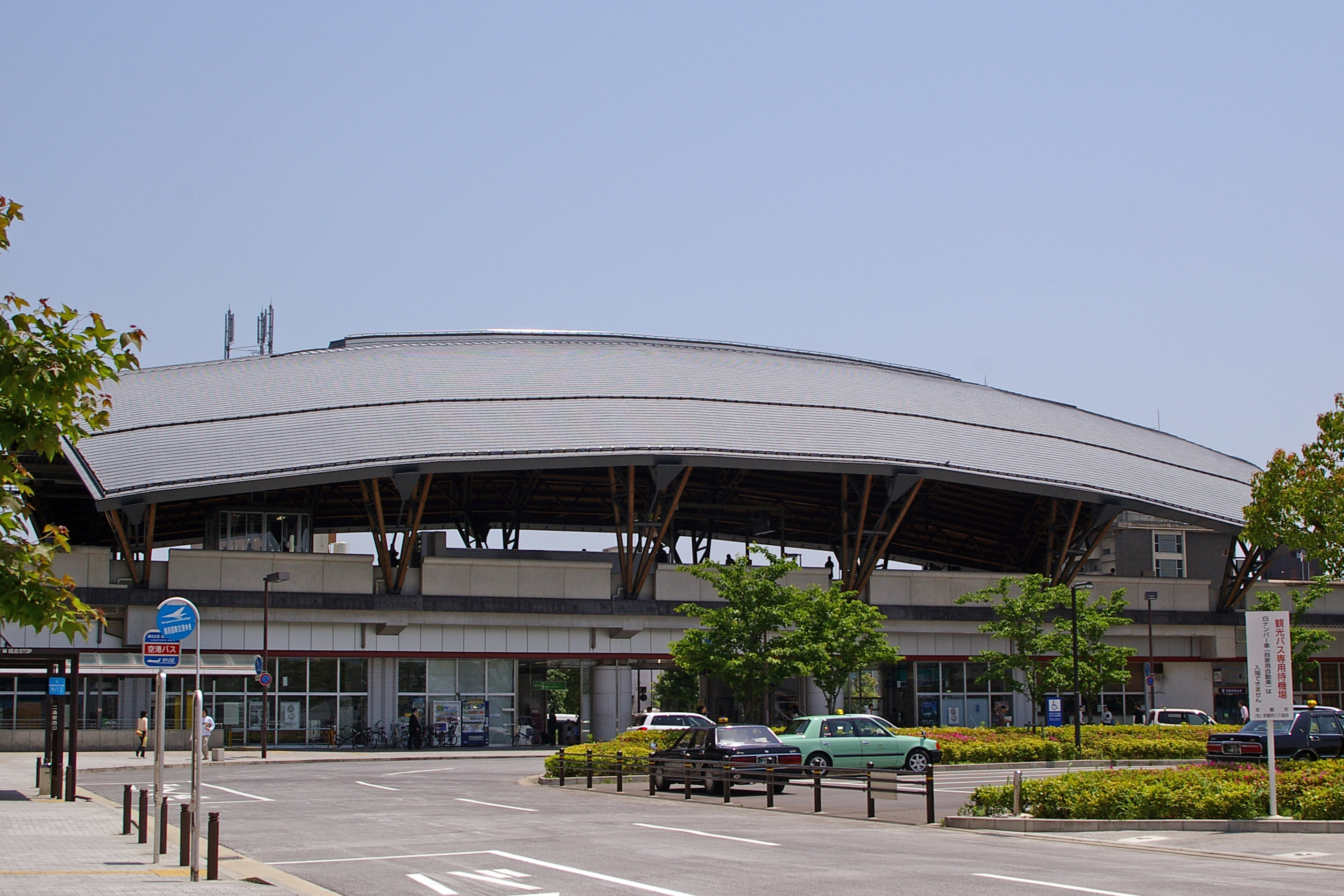
Nijō Station.

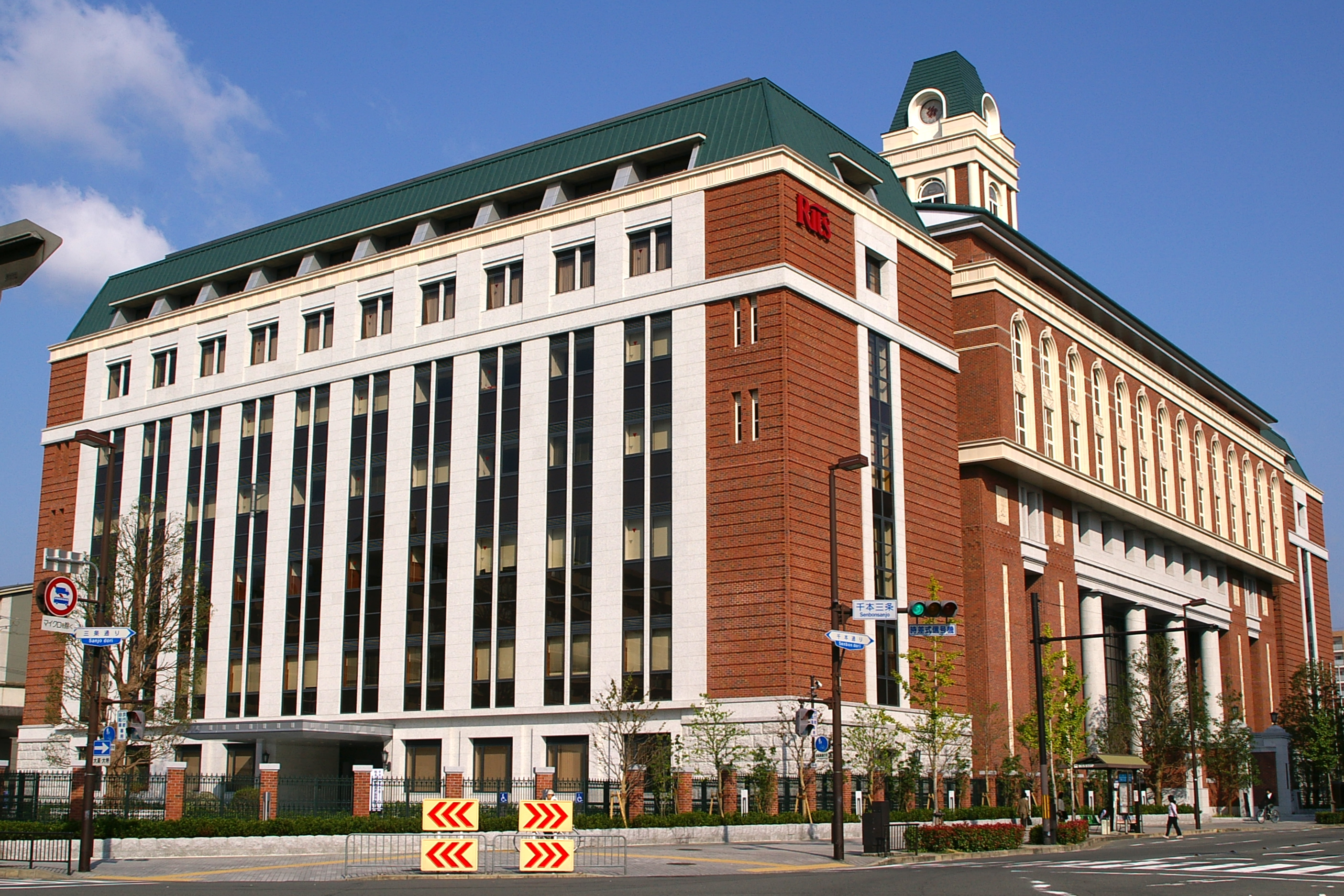
Ritsumeikan University, Nijō Campus.

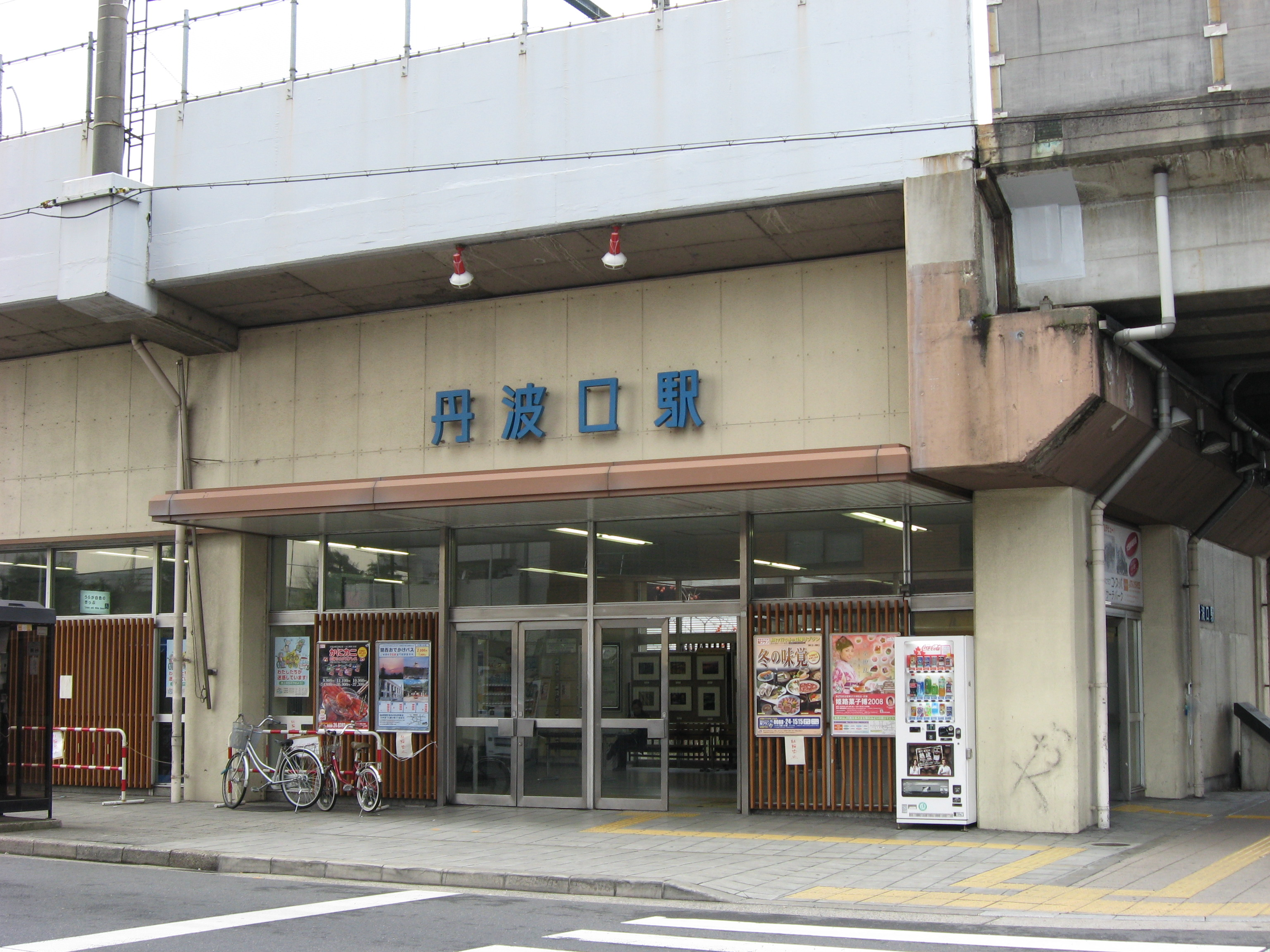
Tanbaguchi Station.

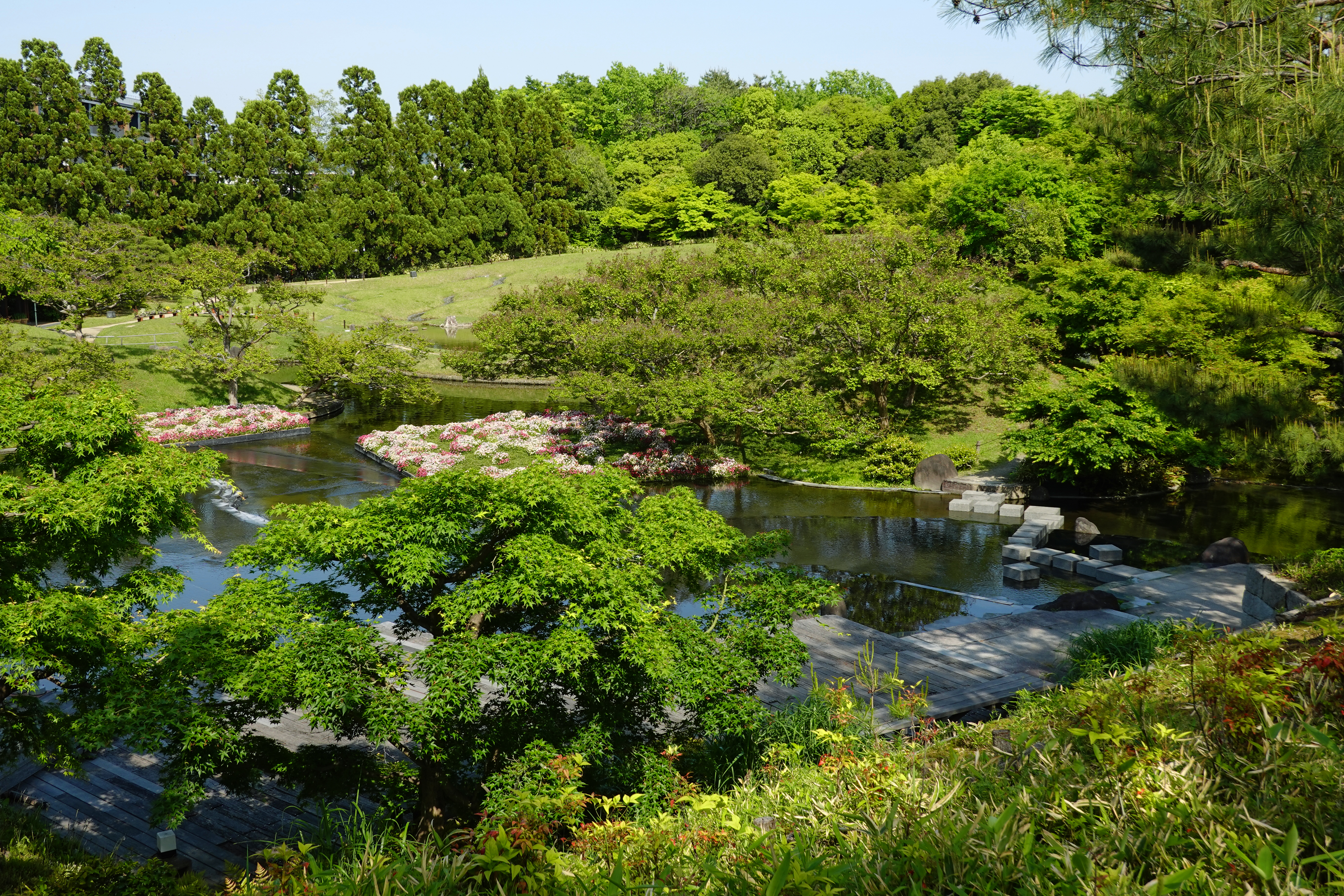
Umekoji Park.

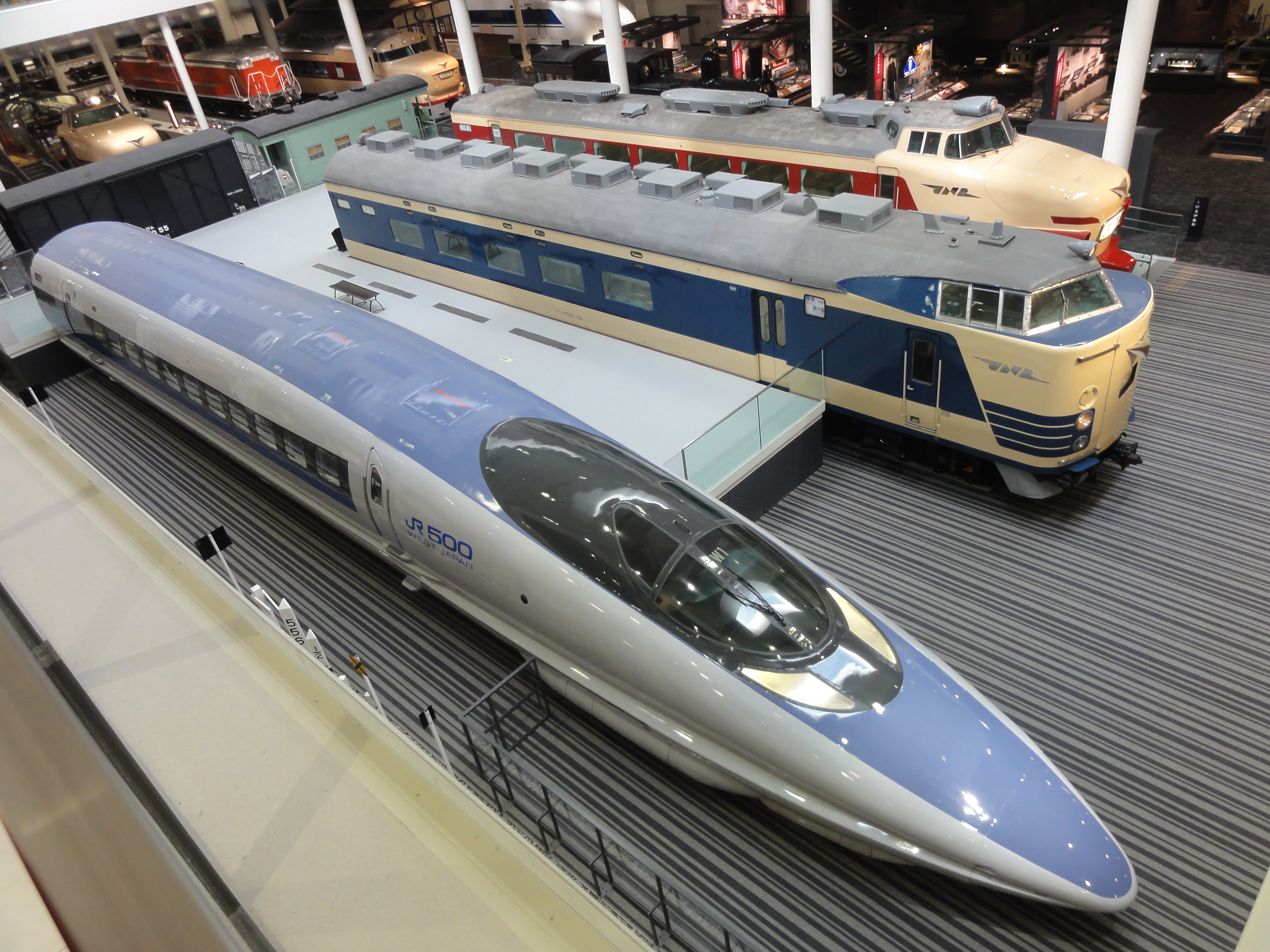
Kyoto Railway Museum.

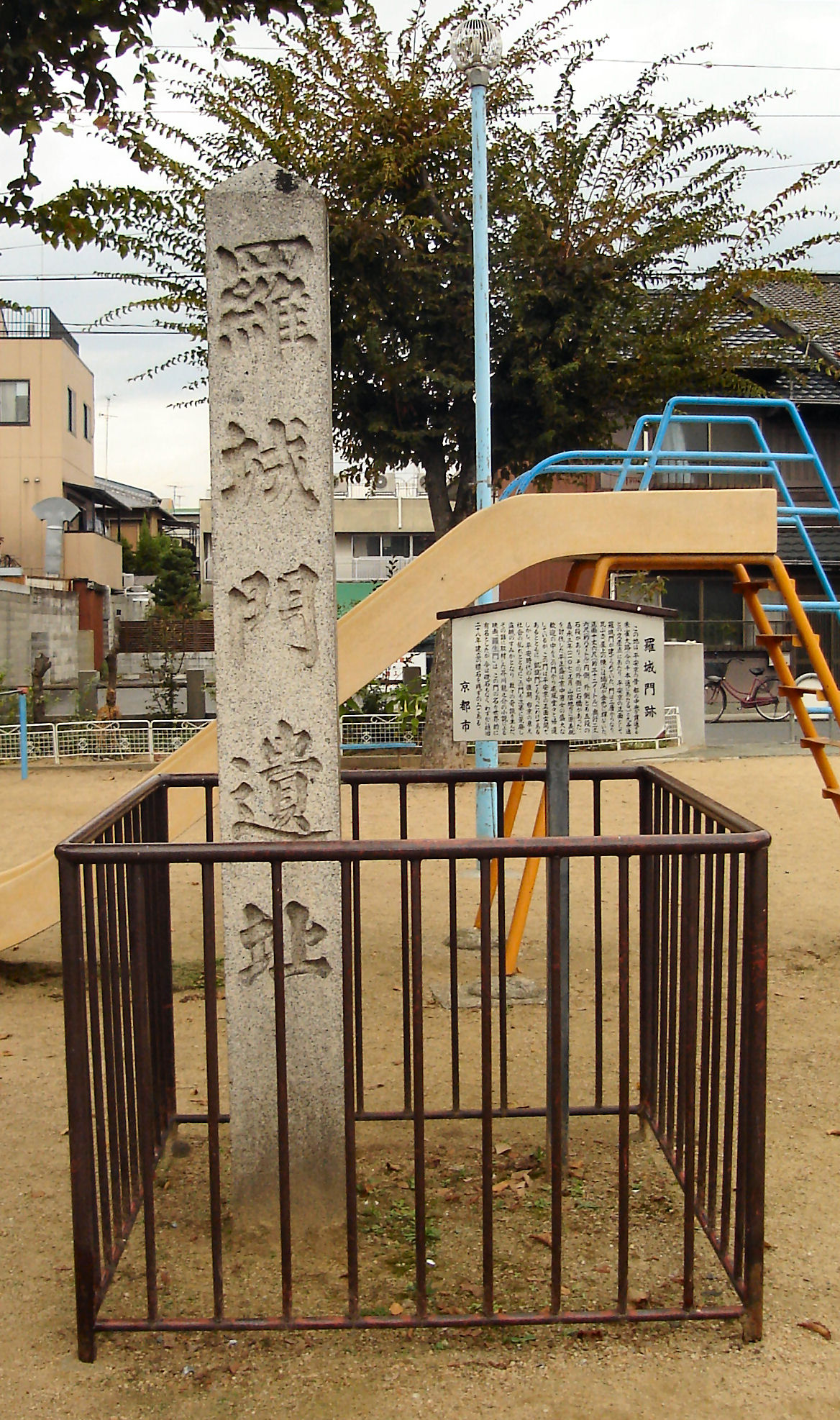
Stone pillar marking the site of the Rashōmon in Kyoto.

- Bukkyo University Nijō Campus.
- Nijō Station.
- Ritsumeikan University Nijō Campus.
- Tambaguchi Station.
- Umekoji Park.
- Kyoto Railway Museum.
- Site of the Heian Kyō Rashōmon (Rajōmon) Gate.

== Links ==
- Kyoto Railway Museum
- Urban Hotel Kyoto-Nijo Premium
