= Nijōjō-mae Station =

Metro station in Kyoto, Japan

T14 Nijōjō-mae Station 二条城前駅
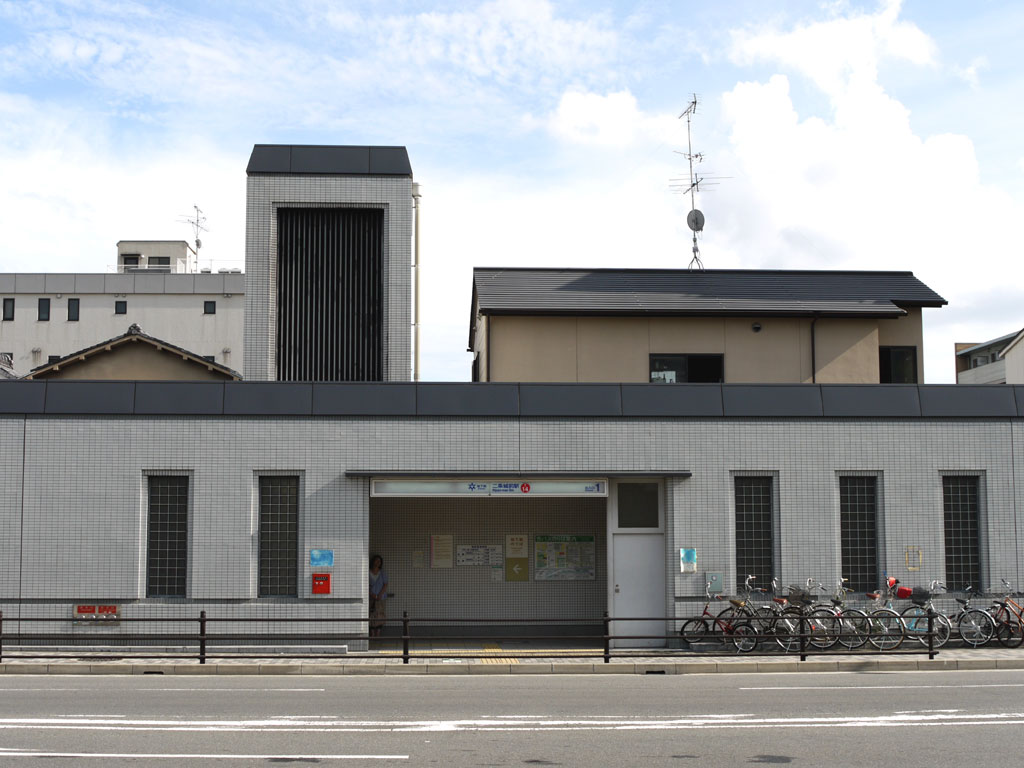
- Nijōjō-mae Station entrance, June 2009

General information
- Location: Nakagyō, Kyoto, Kyoto; Japan
- Coordinates: 35.0121°N 135.7505°E
- Operator: Kyoto Municipal Subway
- Line: Tōzai Line
- Platforms: 1 island platform
- Tracks: 2

Construction
- Structure type: Underground

Other information
- Station code: T14

History
- Opened: 12 October 1997; 28 years ago

Passengers
- FY2016: 8,640 daily

Services
Preceding station	Kyoto Municipal Subway	Following station
Nijō T15 towards Uzumasa Tenjingawa	Tōzai Line	Karasuma Oike T13 towards Rokujizō
Location

Nijōjō-mae Station (二条城前駅, Nijōjō-mae-eki) is a train station in Nakagyō-ku ward, city of Kyoto, Kyoto Prefecture, Japan.

== Lines ==
- Kyoto Municipal Subway
  - Tōzai Line (Station Number: T14)

== Layout ==
The underground station has an island platform with two tracks.

1	■ Tōzai Line	for Uzumasa Tenjingawa
2	■ Tōzai Line	for Rokujizō and Hamaotsu

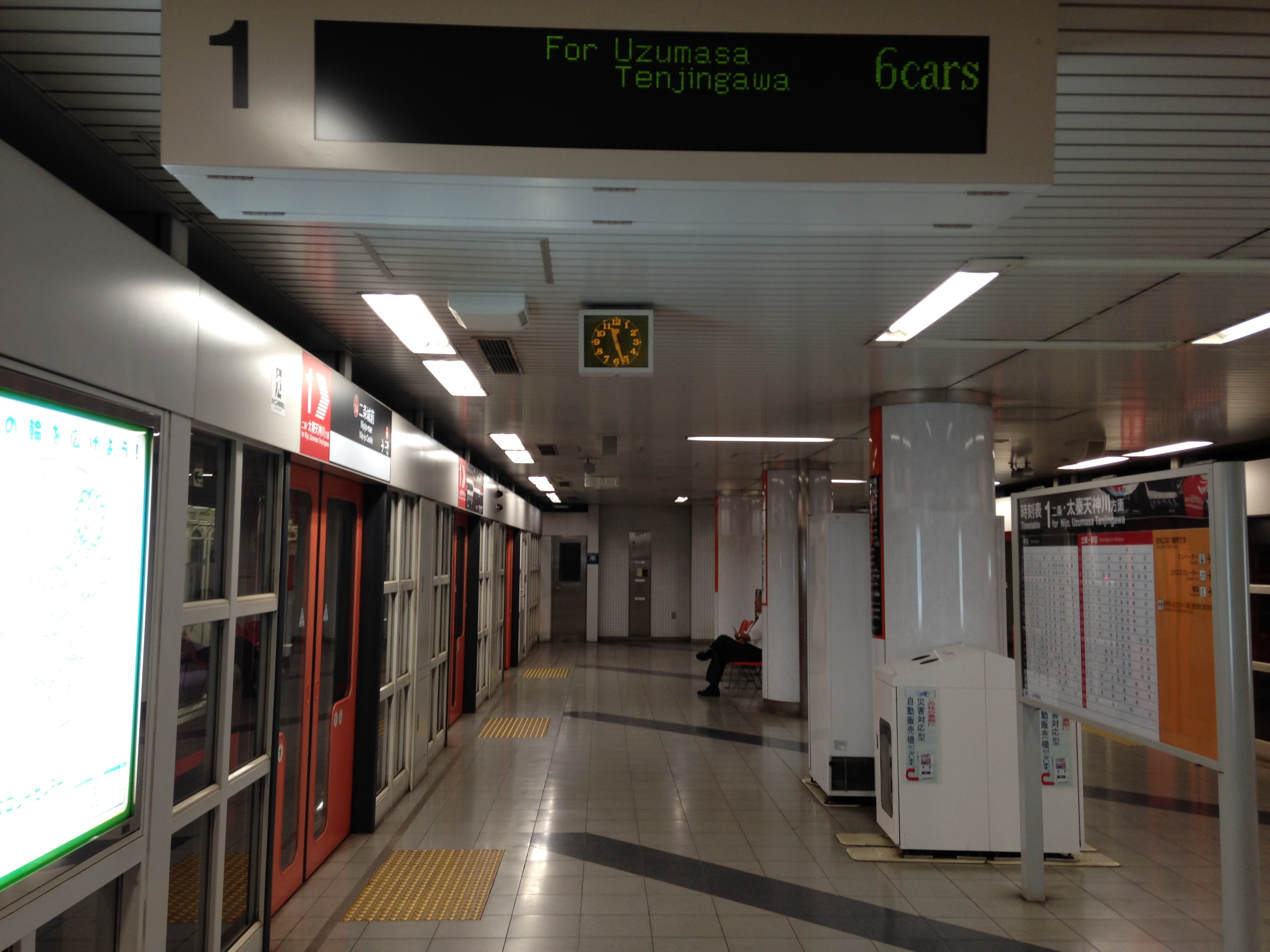
Platform

== Ridership ==
Daily Average
Year	Boarding Passengers	Arriving Passengers	Total
2013	3,970	3,908	7,878
2014	4,276	4,198	8,474
2015	4,289	4,219	8,508
2016	4,354	4,286	8,640
2017	5,221	5,127	10,348

== Surrounding area ==
- Nijō Castle
- Shinsenen Garden
- Mikane Shrine
- Takenobu Inari Jinja
- Horikawa Street
- Oike Street
