= Horikawa Street =

Street in Kyoto city, Japan

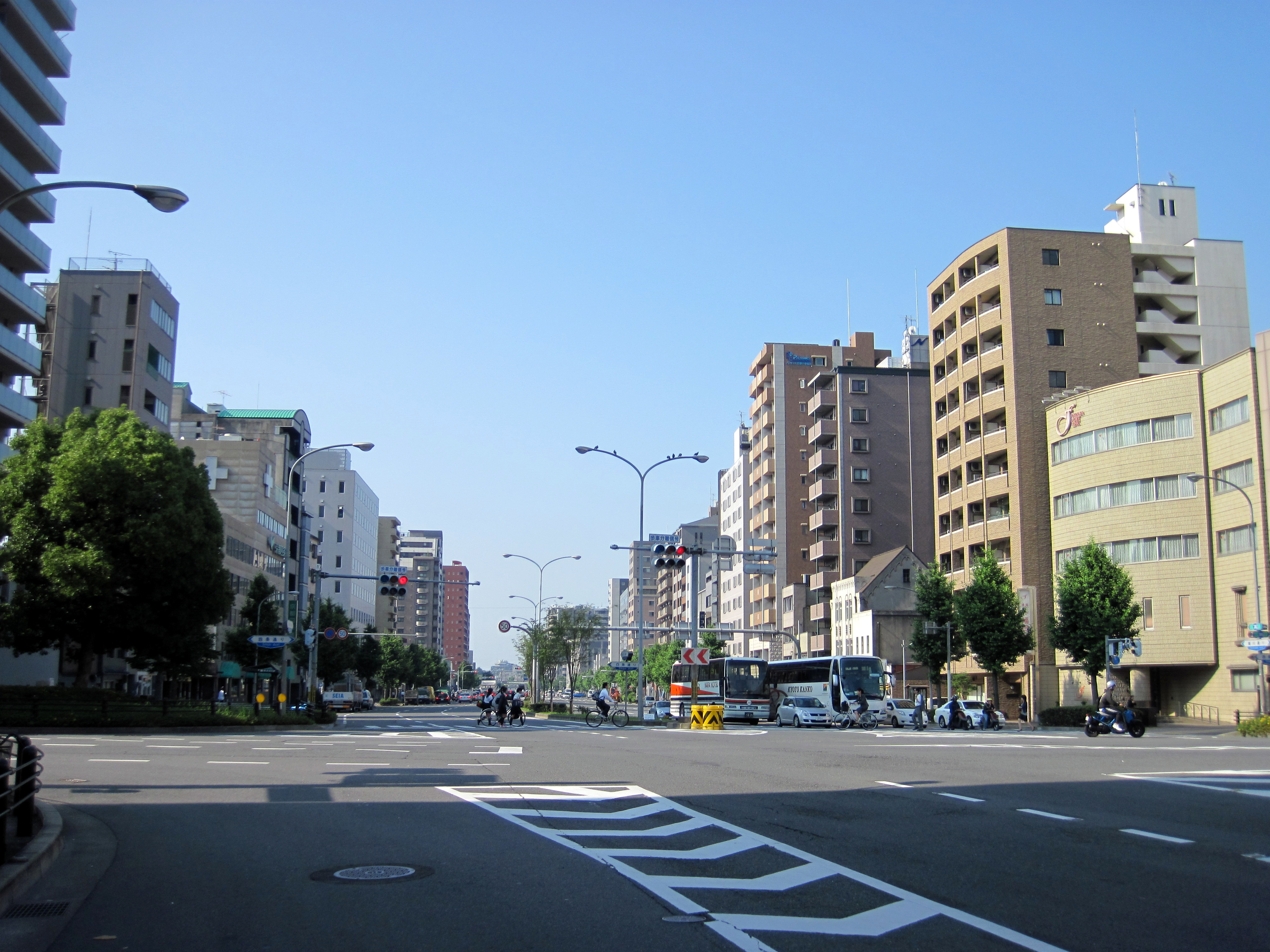
Intersection with Shijō Street, facing south.

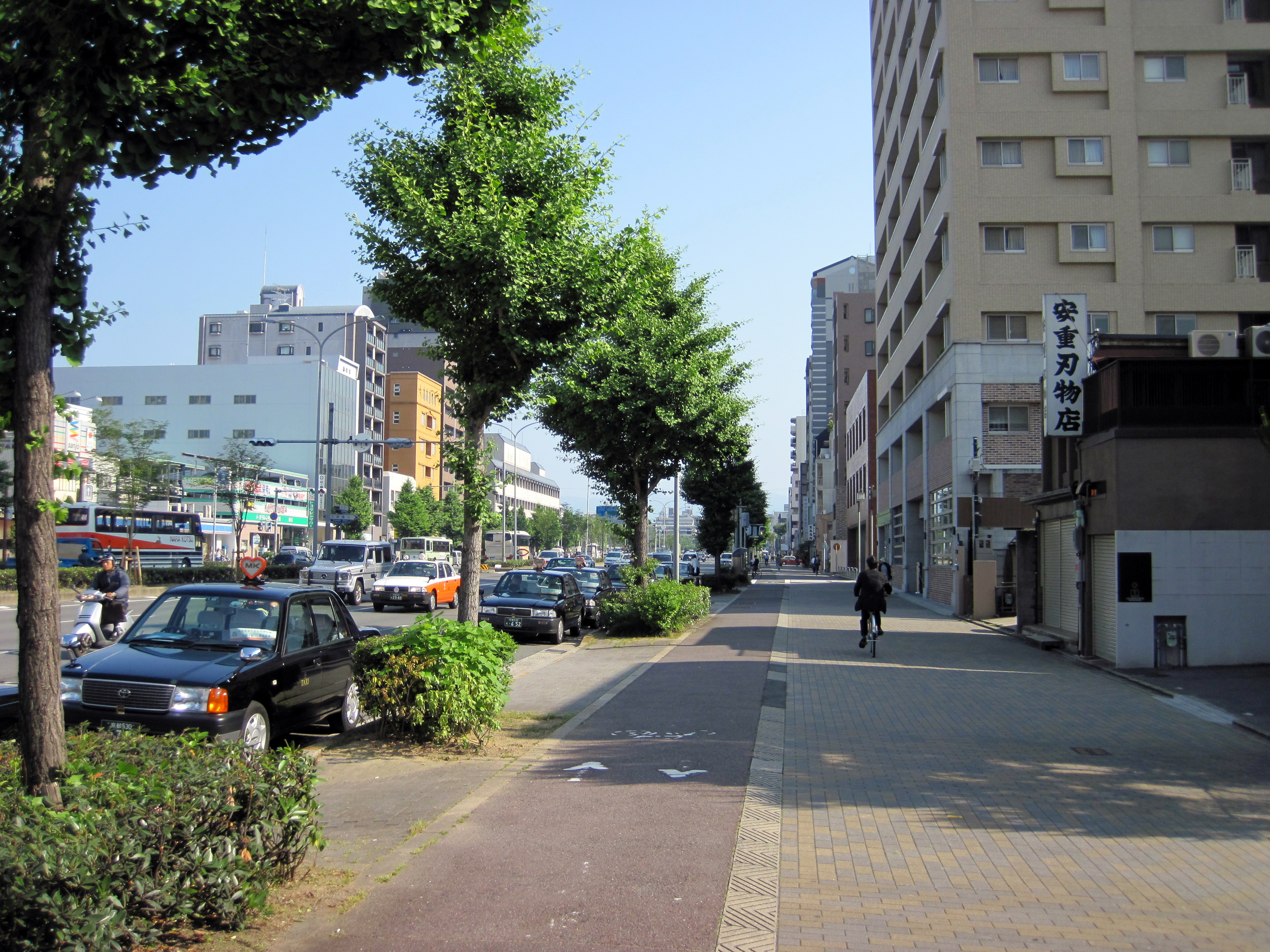
North of the intersection with Shijō Street, the street has a bike lane and a wide sidewalk.

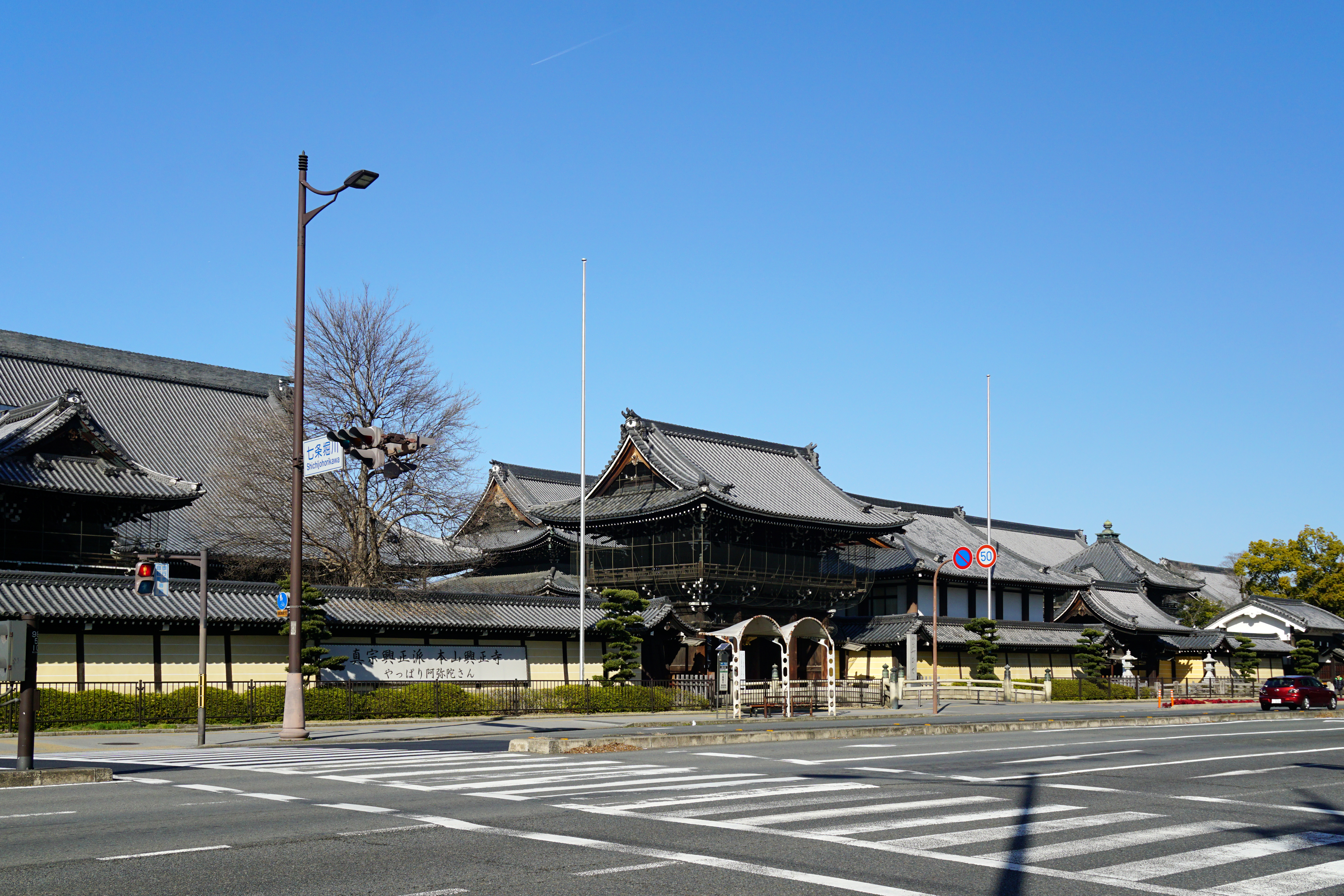
Shichijō and Horikawa Intersection.

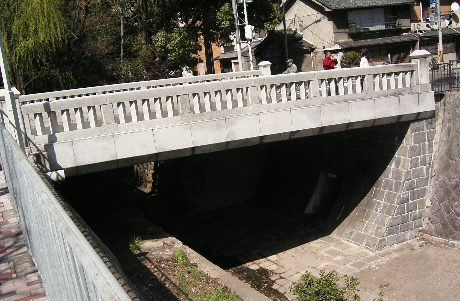
Ichijō Modori Bashi, crossing the Horikawa river.

Horikawa Street (堀川通 ほりかわどおり Horikawa dōri) is one of the major streets running from north to south in the city of Kyoto, Japan. It extends about 8 km from the Misono-bashi bridge near the Kamigamo Shrine (north) to Hachijō Street, near Kyoto Station (south).

== History ==
In the past, the street was divided in two by the Horikawa river, being the Higashi Horikawa Street on the west side and the Nishi Horikawa Street on the east side, having both the same width. During the period between 1895 and 1961 the Kyōto Denki Tetsudō tram line operated between the intersection of Horikawa and Nakadachiuri streets, and the intersection of Shijō Street and Horikawa street. During WWII, the houses along Nishi Horikawa Street were removed in order to create a firewall and, due to later city planning, it was expanded, eventually becoming a highway. In March 2009, a construction project to improve the condition of the Horikawa river was completed, restoring the clear stream and creating a promenade with benches and open spaces.

== Relevant landmarks along the street ==
- Honpō-ji Temple
- Urasenke Chado Research Center (裏千家茶道資料館)
- Nishijin Textile Center
- Seimei Shrine
- Ichijō Modori Bashi (一条戻橋)
- Horikawa Shopping Street (堀川商店街)
- Nijō Castle
- Hotel Ana Crowne Plaza Kyoto
- Nijōjō-mae Subway Station
- Nakagyō-ku Ward Office
- Kyoto Tokyu Hotel
- Nishi Hongan-ji Temple
- Rihga Royal Hotel Kyoto

== Links ==
- Urasenke Chado Research Center
- Nishijin Textile Center
