= Tambaguchi Station =

Railway station in Kyoto, Japan

Tambaguchi Station 丹波口駅
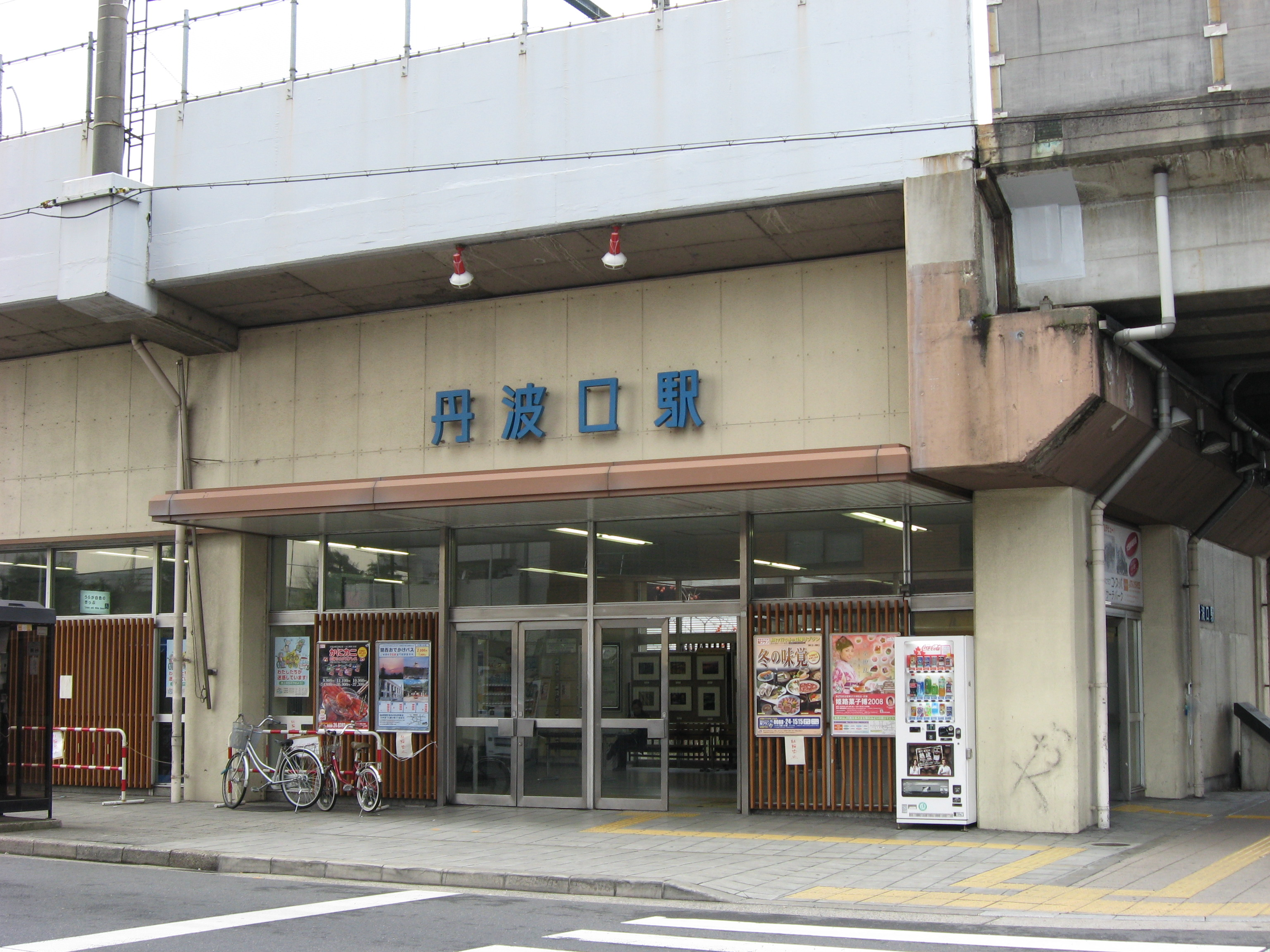
- Station facilities under tracks, January 2008

General information
- Location: 1-5, Chūdōji-minamimachi, Shimogyō, Kyoto, Kyoto （京都市下京区中堂寺南町1-5） Japan
- Coordinates: 34°59′43.51″N 135°44′32.73″E
- Operator: West Japan Railway Company
- Line: Sagano Line
- Platforms: 1 Island platform
- Tracks: 2

Construction
- Structure type: Elevated

Other information
- Station code: JR-E03

History
- Opened: 1897

Passengers
- FY 2023: 12,620 daily

Services
Preceding station	JR West	Following station
Nijo towards Sonobe	Sagano Line Local	Umekōji-Kyōtonishi towards Kyoto
Location

Tambaguchi Station (丹波口駅, Tambaguchi-eki) is a railway station in Shimogyo-ku, Kyoto, Japan.

== Lines ==
- West Japan Railway Company (JR West)
  - Sagano Line (Sanin Main Line)

== Layout ==
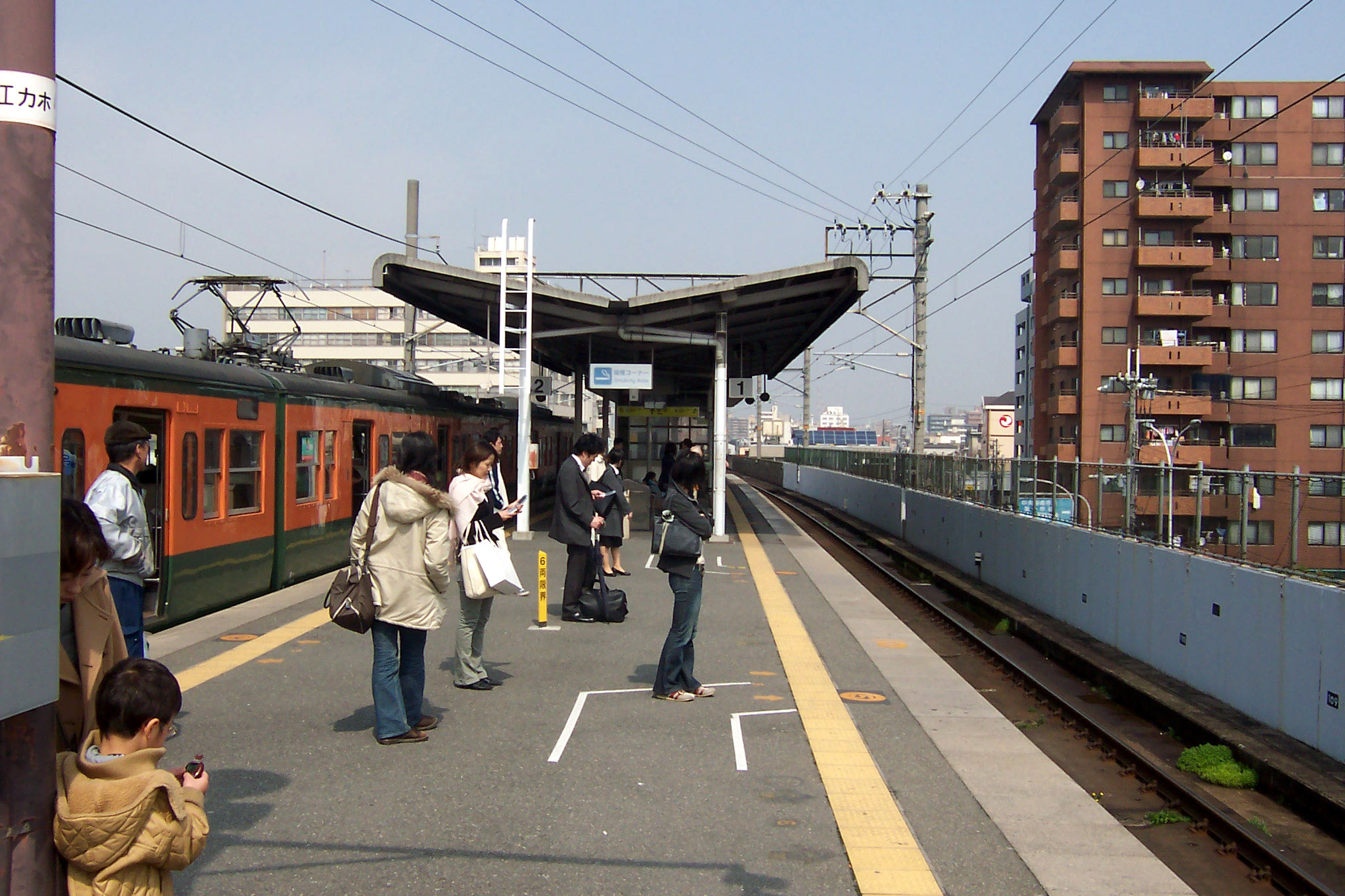
Elevated platform, March 2006

The elevated station has an island platform with two tracks.

1	■ Sagano Line	for Kyoto
2	■ Sagano Line	for Kameoka, Sonobe and Fukuchiyama

== History ==
Tambaguchi Station opened on 27 April 1897, when the Kyoto Railway extended from Nijō to Ōmiya (temporary terminal in Kyoto). On 16 March 1976, the station was moved 500 m (1,600 ft) northward and elevated. At this time, the freight facilities of the station, which had served Kyoto Central Wholesale Market, were not elevated and became independent Kyōto-ichiba Freight Terminal (京都市場駅, Kyōto-ichiba-eki). The freight terminal closed on 1 February 1984.

Station numbering was introduced in March 2018 with Tamabaguchi being assigned station number JR-E03.

== Nearby ==
The station directly abuts the Kyoto Central Wholesale Market, and nearby is the defunct courtesan's district of Shimabara.
