= Bukkyo University =

Private University in Japan

- 佛教大学
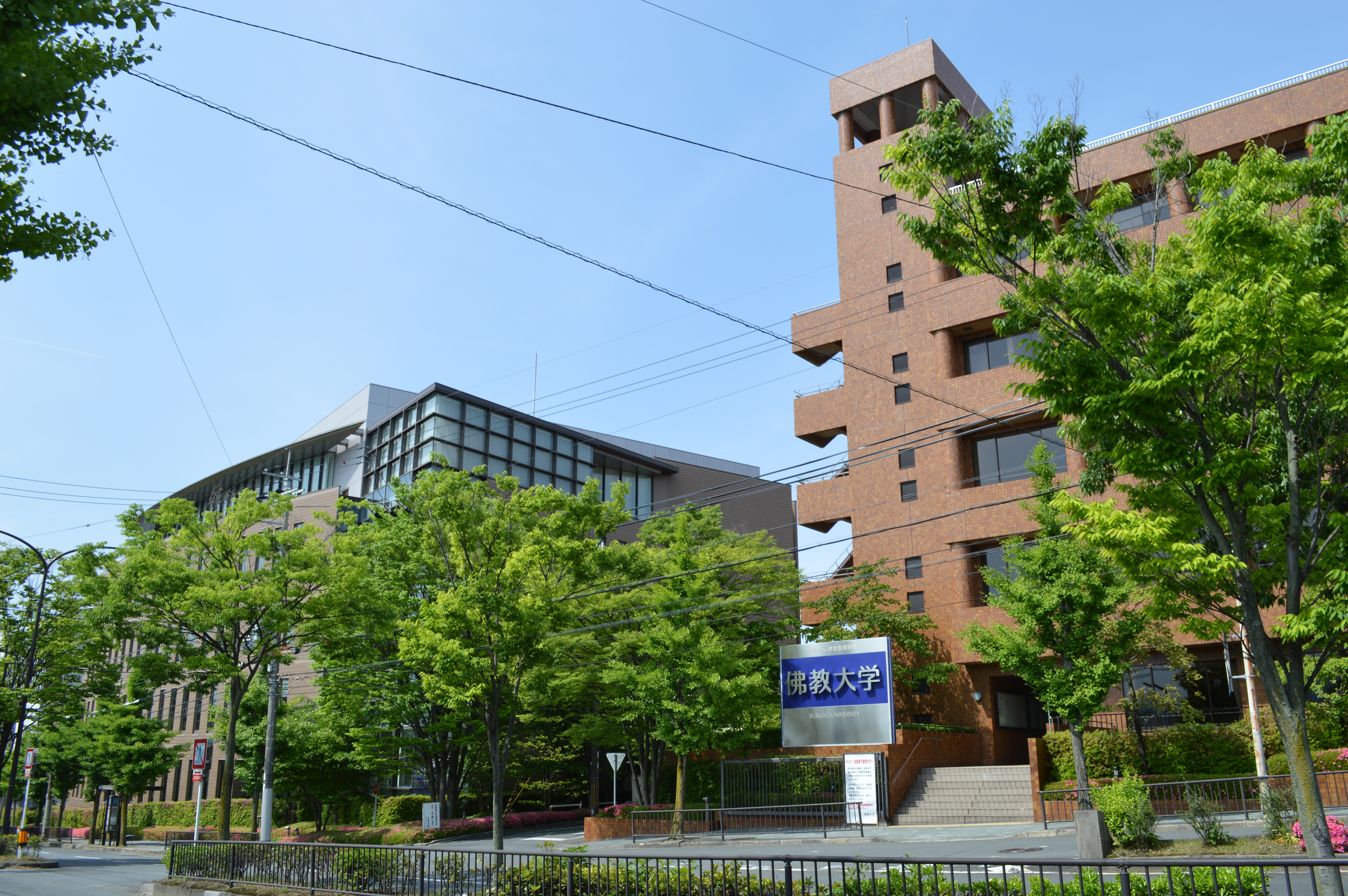
- Main Campus
- Type: Private
- Established: 1912
- Religious affiliation: Jōdo-shū
- President: Masahiro Ito
- Students: 11,585
- Undergraduates: 11,311
- Postgraduates: 274
- Location: Kyoto, Japan; 35°2′36″N 135°44′13.9″E
- Campus: Urban
- Website: www.bukkyo-u.ac.jp/english/

- Location in Kyoto

Bukkyo University (佛教大学, Bukkyō daigaku) is a private university in Kita-ku, Kyoto in Kyoto Prefecture, Japan. The university began as an organization within the Chion-in Temple for the lecturing and study of Buddhism in 1868. The school's official predecessor was founded in 1912, and it was chartered as a junior college in 1949. Bukkyo means Buddhism in Japanese, and the university's philosophy is based on Jōdo-shū (Pure Land) Buddhism.

== Faculties/Graduate Schools ==
=== Faculties ===
- Faculty of Buddhism
- Faculty of Literature
- Faculty of History
- Faculty of Education
- Faculty of Sociology
- Faculty of Social Welfare
- Faculty of Health Sciences

=== Graduate Schools ===
- Graduate School of Literature
- Graduate School of Education
- Graduate School of Sociology
- Graduate School of Social Welfare

== Partner universities ==
- Wonkwang University (Korea)
- Dongguk University (Korea)
- Northwest University (China)
- Kangnam University (Korea)
- Tunghai University (Taiwan)
- Jingjue Buddhism Research Institute (Taiwan)
- Chung Hwa Institute of Buddhist Studies (Taiwan)
- Joong-Ang Sangha University (Korea)
- Zhongguo Institute of Buddhist Studies (China)
- Ho Chi Minh City University of Foreign Languages and Information Technology (Vietnam)
- University of Hawaii at Mānoa (United States)
- Tzu Chi University (Taiwan)
- Zanabazar Buddhist University (Mongolia)
- Jilin University (China)
- College of the Desert (United States)
- Deakin University (Australia)
- Institute of Literature, Chinese Academy of Social Sciences (China)
- Beijing Language and Culture University (China)
