= Shinsenen =

Buddhist temple and garden in Kyoto, Japan

Shinsen-en
- 神泉苑
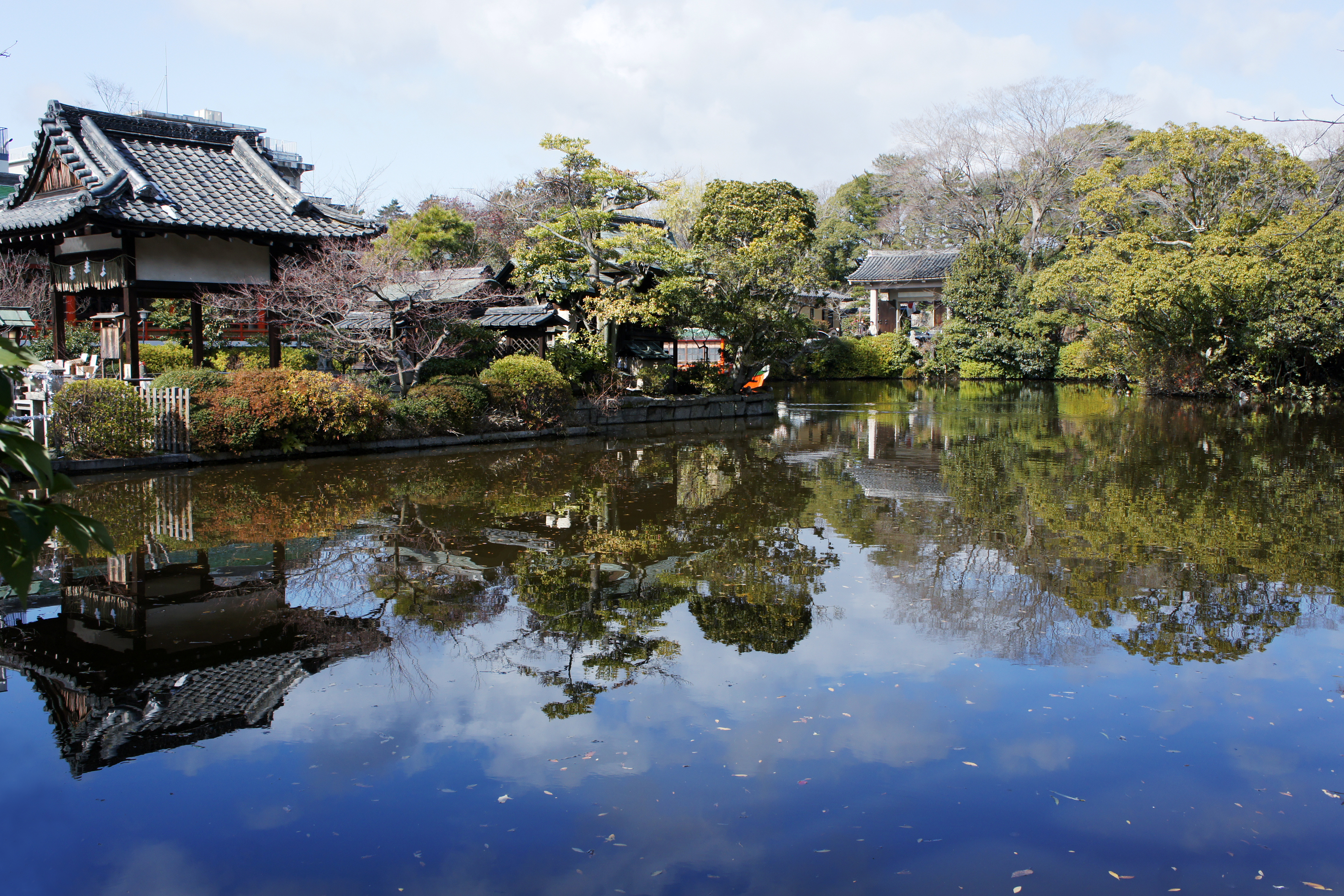
- Shinsen-en

- Shinsen-en Shinsenen (Japan)

Religion
- Affiliation: Buddhist
- Deity: Sho-Kannon
- Rite: Tō-ji Shingon-shū

Location
- Location: Monzenchō, Oike-dori Shisenencho Higashi-iru, Nakagyo-ku, Kyoto-shi, Kyoto-fu
- Country: Japan
- Coordinates: 35°0′40.97″N 135°44′54.14″E

Architecture
- Founder: Kūkai
- Completed: c.826

Website
- Official website
- National Historic Site of Japan

Shinsen-en (神泉苑) is a garden with Buddhist temple located in the approximate center of the modern city of Kyoto, Japan. The temple belongs to the Tō-ji-branch of Shingon-shū and its honzon is a statue of Sho-Kannon. The pond and garden are the last surviving remnant of the original Heian Palace and is the oldest existing garden in Kyoto. It 1935, Shinsen-en was designated a National Historic Site.

== History ==
In the original layout of Heian-kyō in 794, a very large garden centered on a large pond was constructed on the land adjacent to the Heian Palace, extending south from Nijō-dōri to Sanjō-dōri streets, about 500 meters north-to-south and 240 meters east-to-west. (500 meters and 240 meters according to different sources). This was a "forbidden garden" as it was intended as a private garden for the Emperor.

The first time the name "Shiensen-en" appears in historical documents is in an article in the Nihon Kiryaku, which states that Emperor Kanmu visited the garden on July 19, 19th year of the Enryaku era (August 12 of the year 800). An elegant banquet was held there in 802, and it is believed that around this time Shinsen-en became a place for emperors and courtiers to enjoy banquets and leisure. The Nihon Koki also states that Emperor Saga held a "Flower Banquet" at Shinsenen in 812, which is the first known recorded instance of cherry blossom viewing. As the pond in the garden never dried up regardless of the season or even in a drought year, the pond also became known as a holy site, and a place for rainmaking rituals. One of the most famous of these was a rain-making contest in 824 between the priests Morotoshi of Sai-ji and Kūkai of Tō-ji. With the victory of Kūkai, the pond later came under the jurisdiction of Tō-ji and was a frequent location for rain-making rituals. In 863 a plague extended throughout the city and a sacred ritual to appease the angry spirits was held. Later, a total of 66 pikes (representing the provinces of Japan) were erected on the south end of the Shinsenen, Mikoshi from the Gion-sha (today's Yasaka Shrine) were brought in and a ritual was conducted. Over the years this became a local festival and the pikes were mounted on decorated carts, which is said to be the origin of the modern day Gion Matsuri.

However, in the mid-Heian period, Shinsen-en was also used for irrigation, and in 1180 it was destroyed by a storm. During the Kenkyu era (1190–1199), Minamoto no Yoritomo restored it at the command of Prince Shukaku, (the son of Emperor Go-Shirakawa) but it was abandoned again during the Jōkyū War and restored again by Hojō Yasutoki. In 1333, Emperor Go-Daigo appointed Chikyōbō Sonkyō, a monk and aide of Saidai-ji, as the chief priest of Chofuku-ji in Sanjō-Ōmiya for the purpose of restoring Shinsen-en, but the garden and pond fell into ruins. By 1459, the hovels of outcasts, beggars and itinerant priests and merchants occupied the area. Around this time, the Karahashi family attempted to make the area their own which led to a dispute with Tō-ji, but Tō-ji was granted jurisdiction. In 1498, the priests of Chofuku-ji were punished for cultivating Shinsen-en, and Tō-ji took over direct management of the area, but the fields were maintained and expanded, as Tō-ji found that it could rent out the fields for a profit. When Tokugawa Ieyasu built Nijo Castle in 1602, most of the land to the north of Shinsen-en was incorporated into the castle, significantly reducing its size. In addition, the water source for Shinsen-en was also incorporated into the castle grounds (the inner moat of Nijo Castle). However, a monk from Tsukushi, received permission from the Imperial Court and attempted to restore the area as a Shingon temple from 1607 to 1615–1624. Thus, Shinsen-en was rebuilt as a temple under the jurisdiction of Tō-ji and was granted 40 koku of land by the Tokugawa shogunate for its upkeep. The Tahōtō pagoda and temple buildings constructed during that restoration were destroyed in the Kyoto Tenmei fire of 1788.

The temple's current Main Hall is a structure relocated from Tō-ji in 1847. The Zennyo Ryuosha Shrine, the Haiden, Heiden and middle gate all date from 1813.

Shinsen-en is about a 10-minute walk east of Nijō Station on the JR West Sagano Line (Sanin Main Line), Kyoto Municipal Subway Tozai Line

== See also ==
- List of Historic Sites of Japan (Kyoto)
