= Nijō Castle =

Castle in Kyoto, Japan

Coordinates: 35°0′51″N 135°44′51″E

Former Imperial Villa Nijō Castle
- 元離宮二条城
- Kyoto, Japan
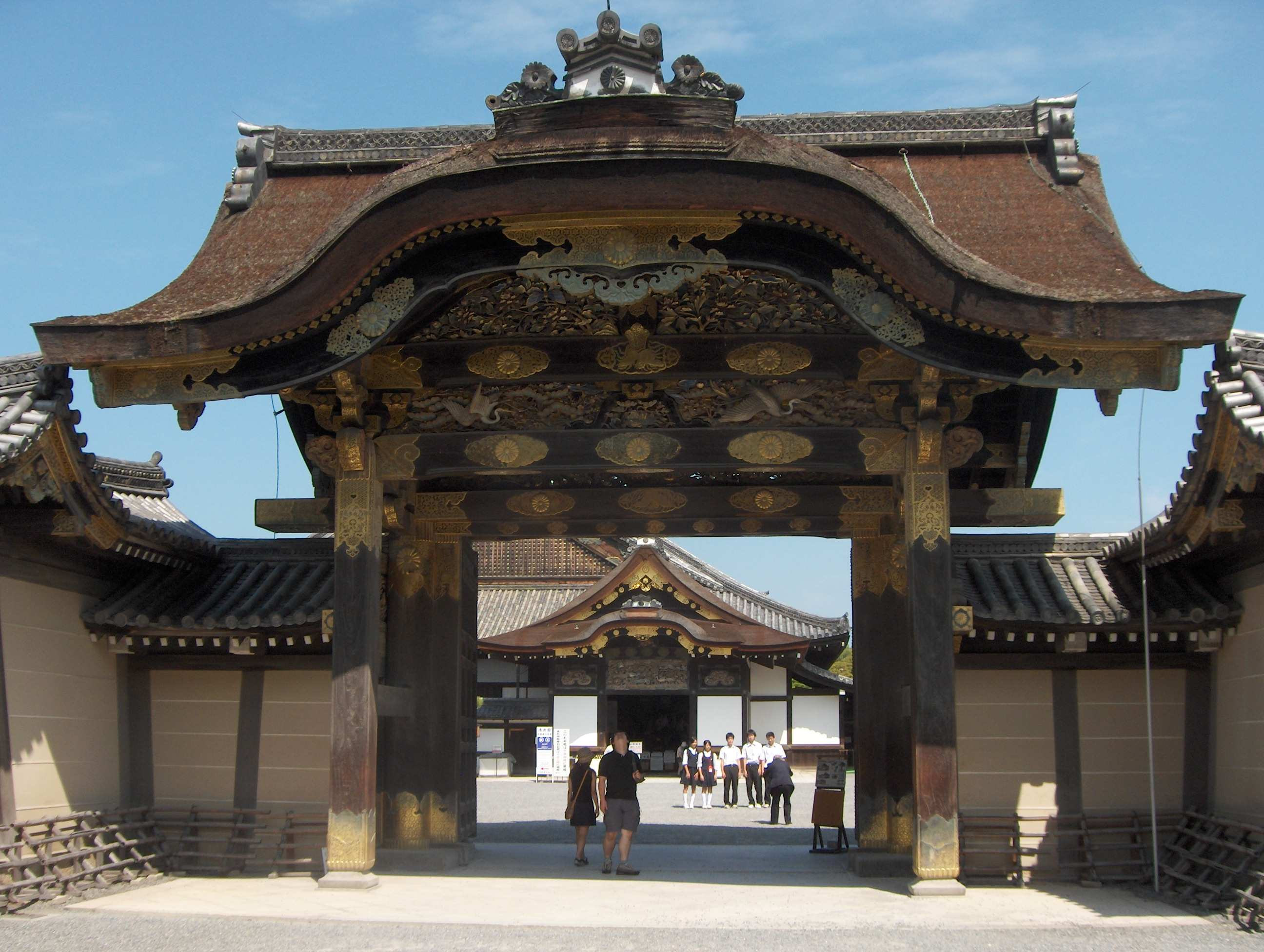
- The karamon main gate to Ninomaru Palace

Site information
- Type: Plains castle (平城)
- Owner: Kyoto
- Open to the public: yes

Site history
- Built: 1624; 402 years ago
- Built by: Tokugawa shogunate
- In use: 1626–1939

Nijō Castle (二条城, Nijō-jō) is a flatland castle in Kyoto, Japan. The castle consists of two concentric rings (Kuruwa) of fortifications, the Ninomaru Palace, the ruins of the Honmaru Palace, various support buildings and several gardens. The surface area of the castle is 275,000 square metres (27.5 ha; 68 acres), of which 8,000 square metres (86,000 sq ft) is occupied by buildings.

It is one of the seventeen Historic Monuments of Ancient Kyoto which have been designated by UNESCO as a World Heritage Site.

== History ==
Plan of Nijō Castle: 1. Great Eastern Gate (Higashi-Ōte-mon); 2. Guard house 3. Kara-mon; 4. Honourable Carriage Approach; 5. Ninomaru Palace; 6. Kuroshoin; 7. Shiroshoin (shōgun's quarters); 8. Ninomaru Garden; 9. Pond; 10. Kitchen; 11. Meal preparation room 12. Storage buildings 13. Resting room 14. Toilets / 15. Southern Gate (Minami-mon); 16. Cherry-trees grove 17. Plum-trees grove 18. West Gate (Nishi-mon); 19. Honmaru; 20. Bridge; 21. Honmaru Garden; 22. Donjon; 23. Waraku-an (teahouse); 24. Koun-tei (teahouse); 25. Great North Gate (Kita-Ōte-mon); 26. Green Garden; 27. Gallery

In 1601, Tokugawa Ieyasu, the founder of the Tokugawa shogunate, ordered all the feudal lords in western Japan to contribute to the construction of Nijō Castle, which was completed during the reign of his grandson Tokugawa Iemitsu in 1626. While the castle was being built, a portion of land from the partially abandoned Shinsenen Garden (originally part of the imperial palace and located south) was absorbed, and its abundant water was used in the castle gardens and ponds. Parts of Fushimi Castle, such as the main tower and the karamon, were moved here in 1625–26. Nijo Castle was built as the Kyoto residence of the Tokugawa shōguns. The Tokugawa shogunate used Edo as the capital city, but Kyoto continued to be the home of the Imperial Court. Kyoto Imperial Palace is located north-east of Nijō Castle.

The central keep, or tenshu, was struck by lightning and burned to the ground in 1750. In 1788, the Inner Ward was destroyed by a citywide fire. The site remained empty until it was replaced by a prince's residence transferred from the Kyoto Imperial Palace in 1893.

In 1867, the Ninomaru Palace, in the Outer Ward, was the stage for the declaration by Tokugawa Yoshinobu, returning the authority to the Imperial Court (大政奉還). In 1868 the Imperial Cabinet was installed in the castle. The palace became imperial property and was declared a detached palace. During this time, the Tokugawa hollyhock crest was removed wherever possible and replaced with the imperial chrysanthemum.

In 1939, the palace was donated to the city of Kyoto and opened to the public the following year. In the 21st century, typhoons have periodically caused sections of plaster to peel off the walls after exposure to rain and wind.

It is generally believed that the karamon gate of Toyokuni shrine was originally built for Hideyoshi's Fushimi castle in 1598. When the castle was dismantled in 1623, the gate was first moved to Nijō Castle, and then to the Konchi-in in Nanzen-ji. It was finally relocated to Toyokuni shrine in 1876 after the Meiji Restoration.

== Fortifications ==
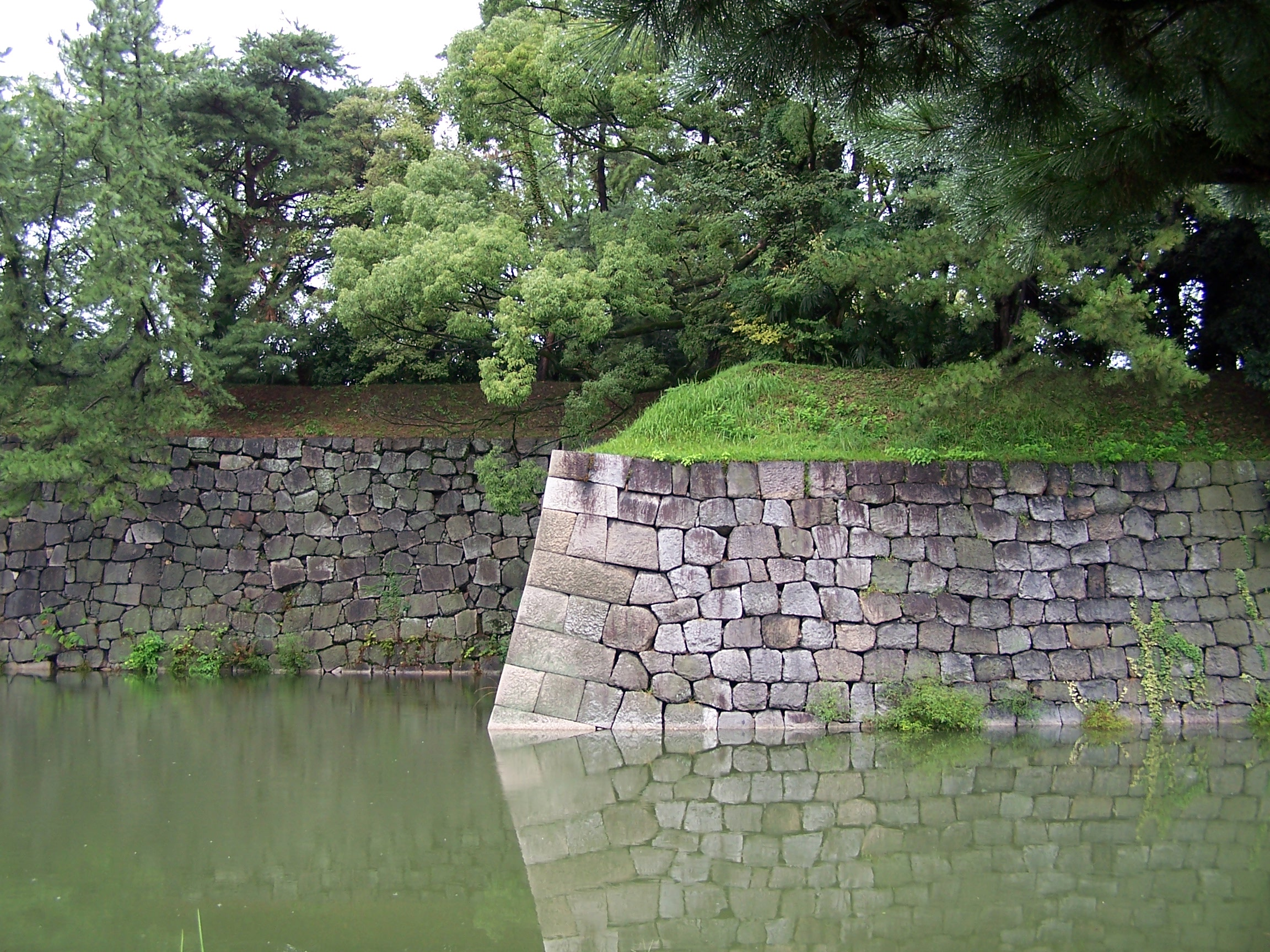
Inner walls and moat of the Nijō Castle

Nijō Castle has two concentric rings of fortifications, each consisting of a wall and a wide moat. The outer wall has four gates, while the inner wall has two, one of them in ruins. Originally, there were only three gates on the outer wall, but the Minamimon ("South Gate") was built in 1915 for a visit from the emperor. Two corner turrets survive on the outer wall as well. In the southwest corner of the inner wall, there are foundations of a five-story keep, destroyed by a fire in 1750. The inner walls surround the Inner Ward, which contain Honmaru ("Inner Ward") Palace with its garden. Ninomaru ("Second Ward") Palace, the kitchens, guard house, three storehouses, and a number of gates and several gardens are located in the Outer Ward, between the two main rings of fortifications.

== Ninomaru Palace ==
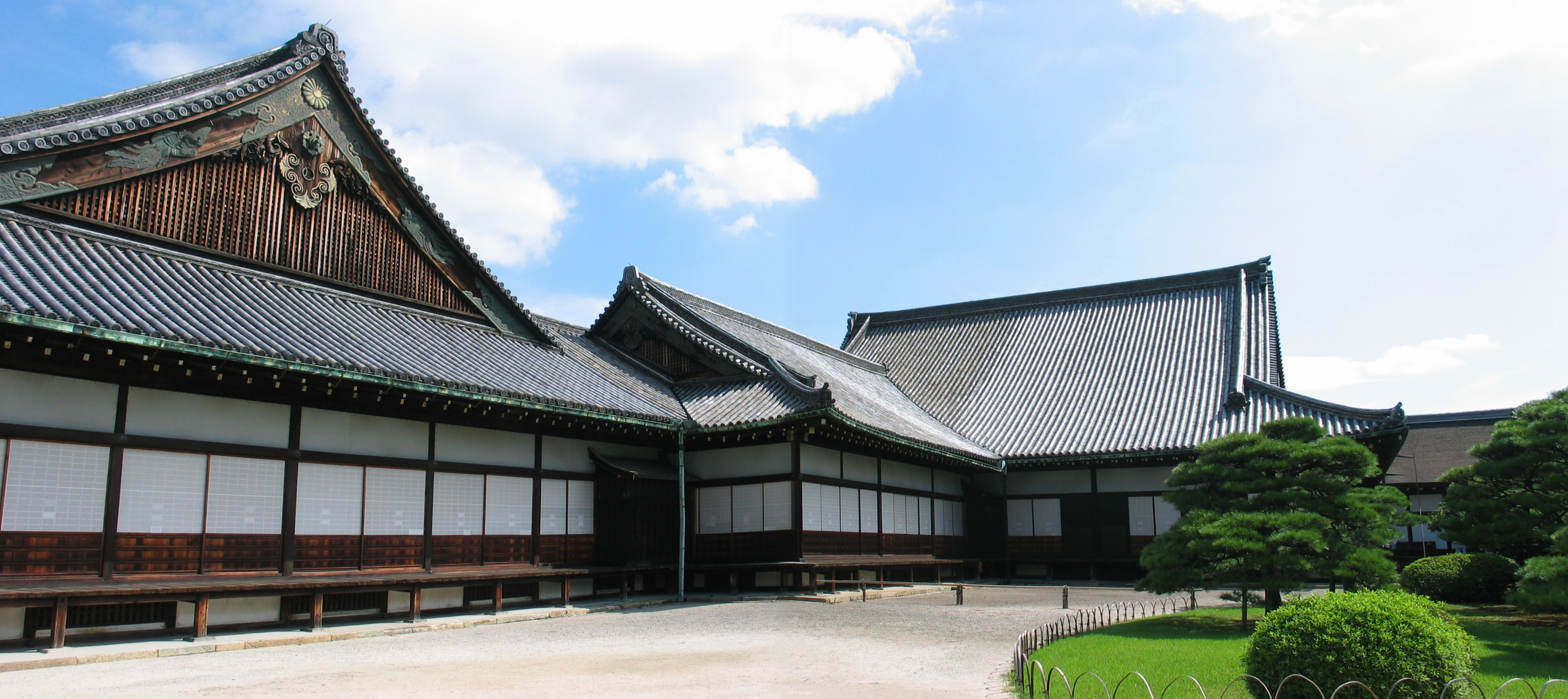
Ninomaru palace of Nijō Castle

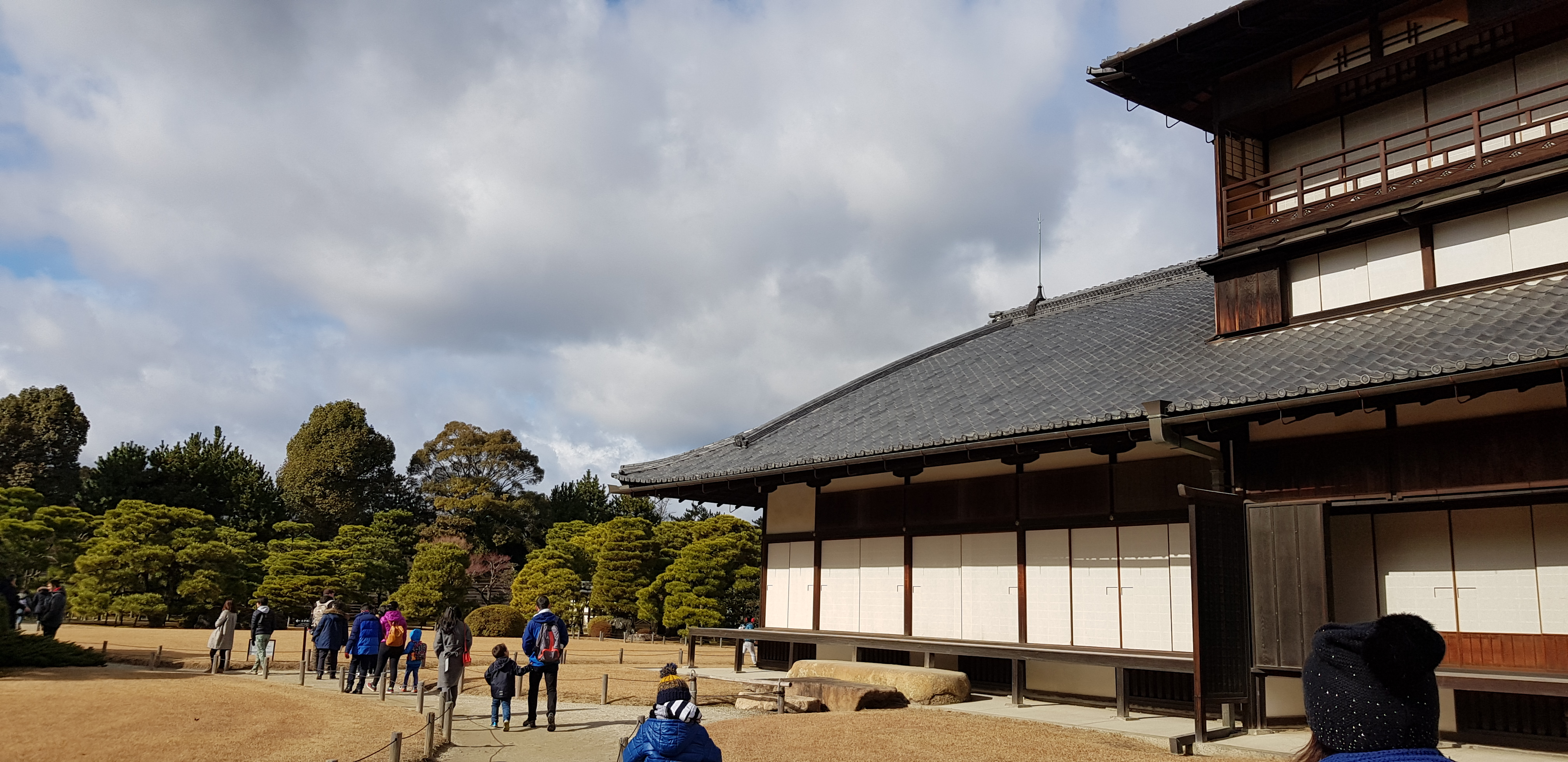
Exterior view of the Ninomaru Palace

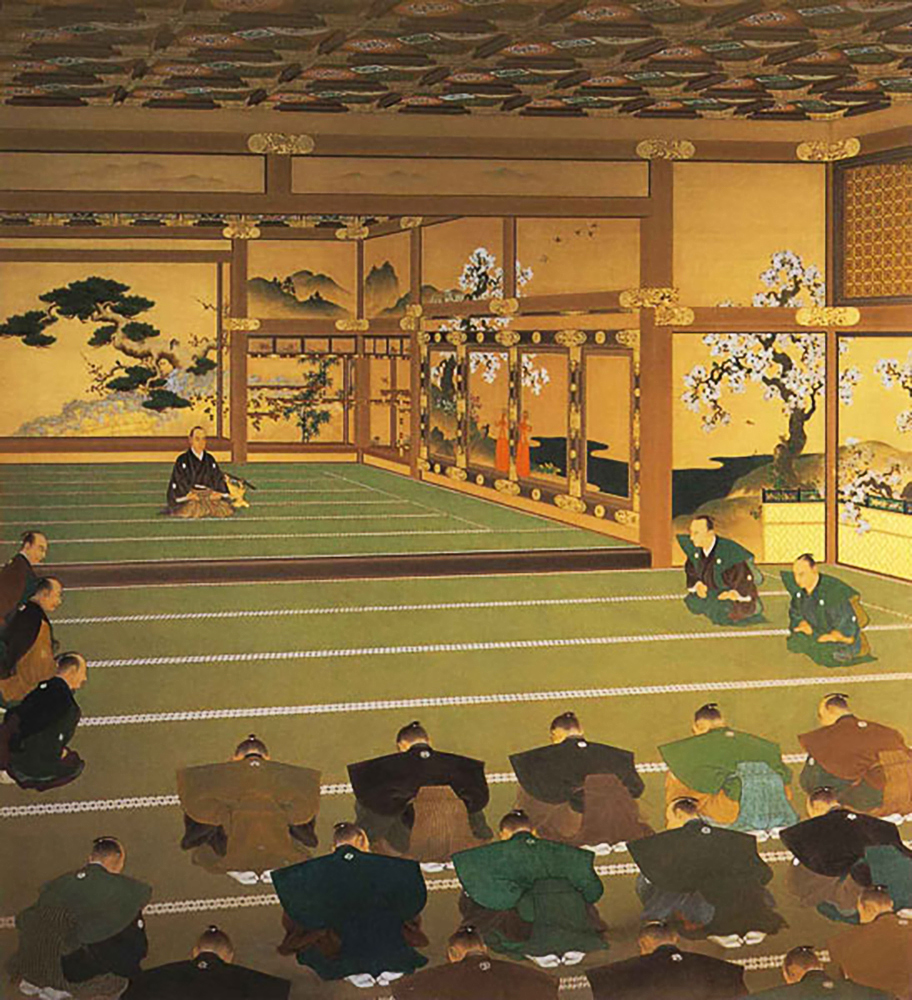
Tokugawa Yoshinobu in the Kuroshoin

Map of the Ninomaru Palace (click for detailed view and explanation)

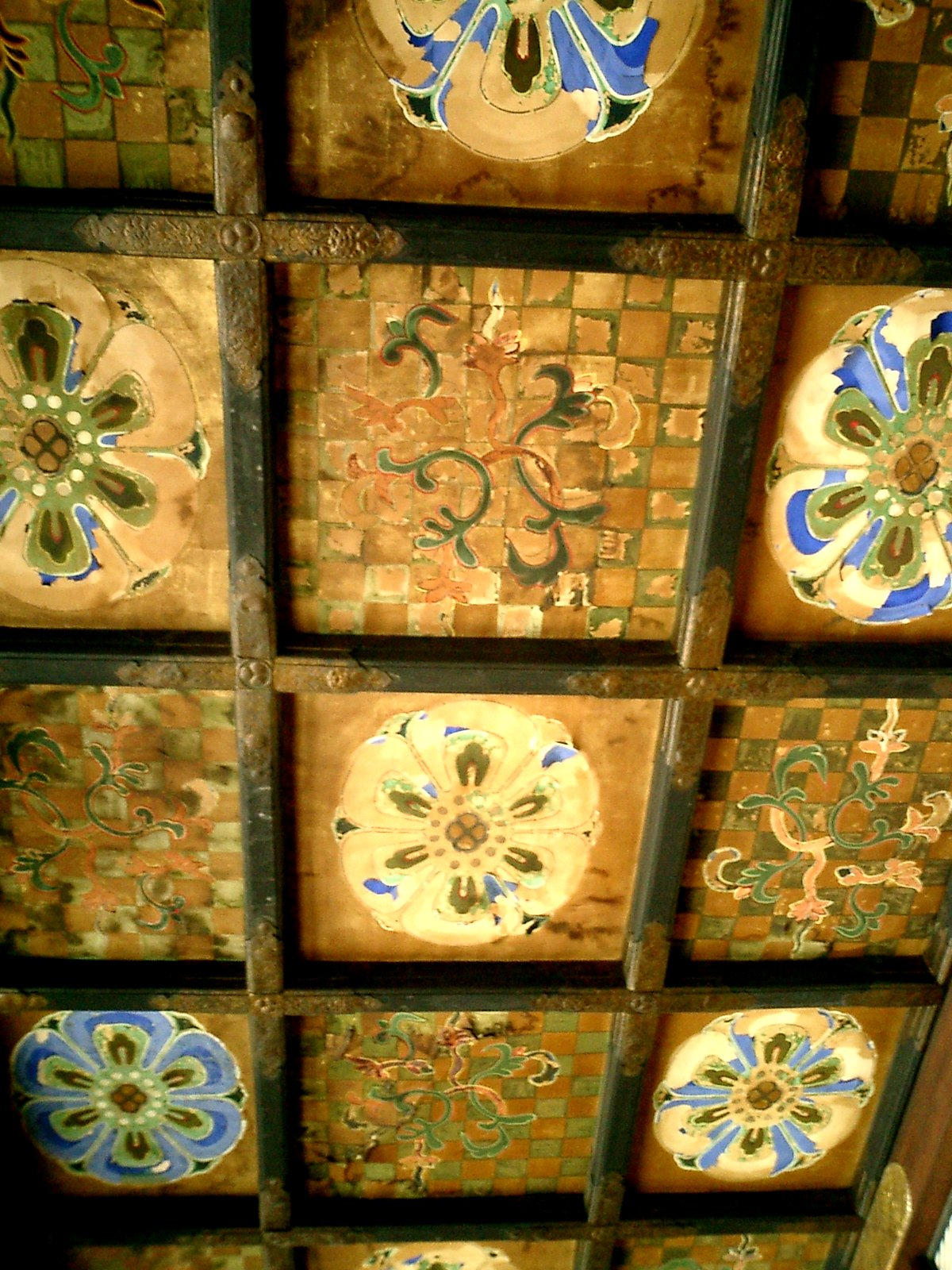
Detail of the ceiling of Ninomaru Palace

The 3,300-square-meter (36,000-square-foot) Ninomaru Palace (二の丸御殿, Ninomaru Goten) consists of six connected separate main buildings and is built almost entirely of Hinoki cypress. The decoration includes lavish quantities of gold leaf and elaborate wood carvings, intended to impress visitors with the power and wealth of the shōguns. The sliding doors and walls of each room are decorated with wall paintings by artists of the Kanō school. The six main buildings have National Treasure Status, and other buildings in the palace complex have Important Cultural Property status.

The castle is an excellent example of social control manifested in architectural space. Low-ranking visitors were received in the outer regions of the Ninomaru, whereas high-ranking visitors were shown the more subtle inner chambers. Rather than attempt to conceal the entrances to the rooms for bodyguards (as was done in many castles), the Tokugawas chose to display them prominently. Thus, the construction lent itself to expressing intimidation and power to Edo-period visitors.

The building houses several different reception chambers, offices and the living quarters of the shōgun, where only female attendants were allowed. One of the most striking features of the Ninomaru Palace are the "nightingale floors" (uguisubari) in the corridors that make a chirping sound when walked upon. These are often incorrectly described as a feature to alert the presence of intruders, but it is actually just caused by clamps moving against nails in the wooden beams that support the floor. However, the design of the palace buildings do contain defensive features; for example, some of the rooms in the castle also contained special doors where the shogun's bodyguard could sneak out to protect him.

The room sequence starting at the entrance is:

- Yanagi-no-ma (Willow Room),
- Wakamatsu-no-ma (Young Pine Room)
- Tozamurai-no-ma (Retainers' Room)
- Shikidai-no-ma (Reception Room)
- Rōchu-no-ma (Ministers' Offices)
- Chokushi-no-ma (Imperial Messenger's Room)

The Ōhiroma (Great Hall) is the central core of the Ninomaru Palace and consists of four chambers:

- Ichi-no-ma (First Grand Chamber)
- Ni-no-ma (Second Grand Chamber)
- San-no-ma (Third Grand Chamber)
- Yon-no-ma (Fourth Grand Chamber)

as well as the Musha-kakushi-no-ma (Bodyguards' Chamber) and the Sotetsu-no-ma (Japanese fern-palm chamber).

The rear sections are the Kuroshoin (Inner Audience Chamber) and Shiroshoin (shōgun's living quarters). The main access to the Ninomaru is through the karamon, a court and the mi-kurumayose or "honourable carriages approach".

== Honmaru Palace ==
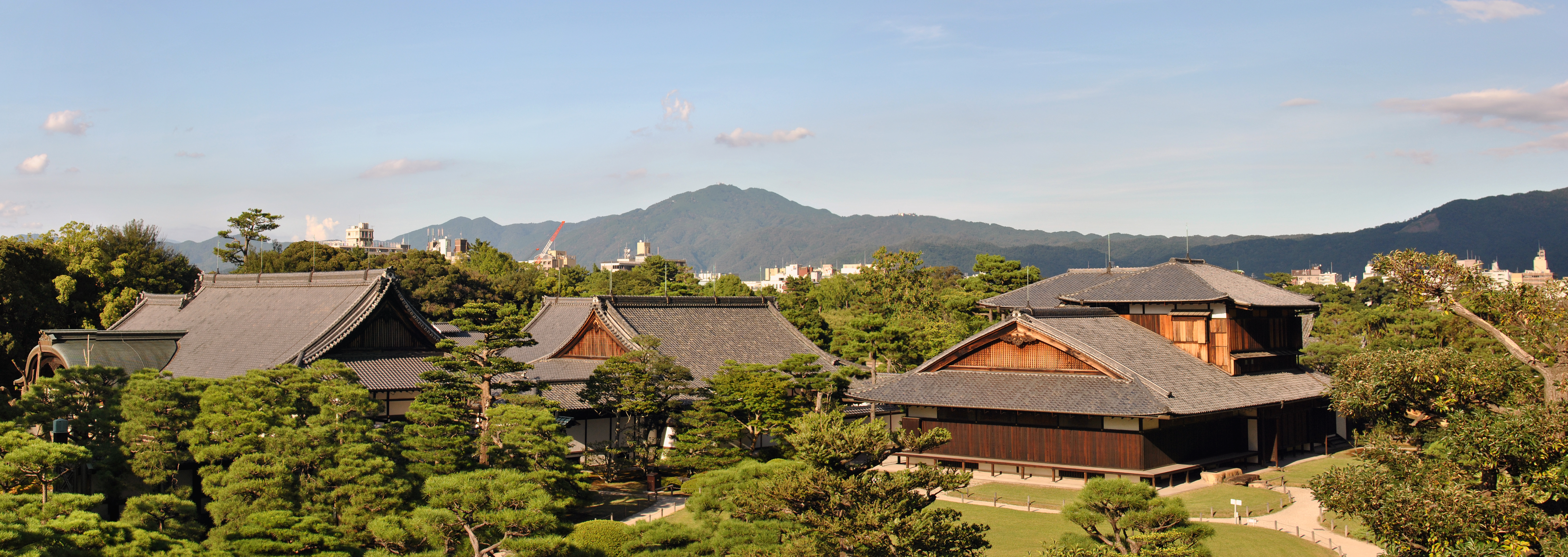
Honmaru Palace

Honmaru Palace (本丸御殿, Honmaru Goten) has a surface area of 1,600 square meters (17,000 square feet). The complex has four parts: living quarters, reception and entertainment rooms, entrance halls and kitchen area. The different areas are connected by corridors and courtyards. The architectural style is late Edo period. The palace displays paintings by several famous masters, such as Kanō Eigaku.

Honmaru Palace was originally similar to Ninomaru Palace. The original structures were replaced by the present structures between 1893 and 1894, by moving one part of the former Katsura Palace within the Kyoto Imperial Enclosure (Kyoto Gyoen, the enclosure surrounding the Kyoto Imperial Palace) to the inner ward of Nijō Castle, as part of the systematic clearing of the disused residences and palaces in the Imperial Enclosure after the Imperial Court moved to Tokyo in 1869. In its original location, the palace had 55 buildings, but only a small part was relocated. In 1928 the enthronement banquet of Emperor Hirohito was held here.

== Gardens ==
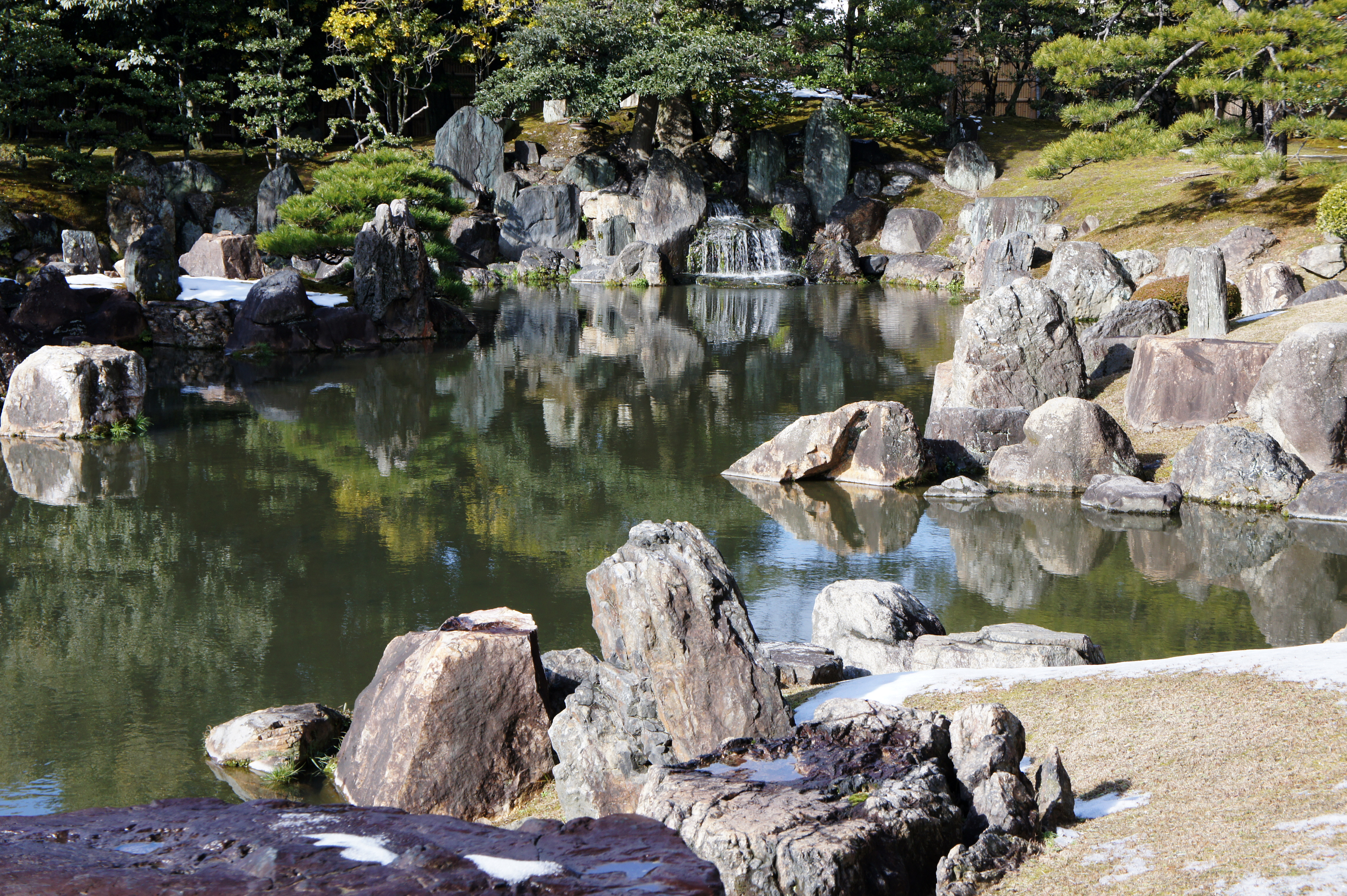
The pond of the Ninomaru Garden

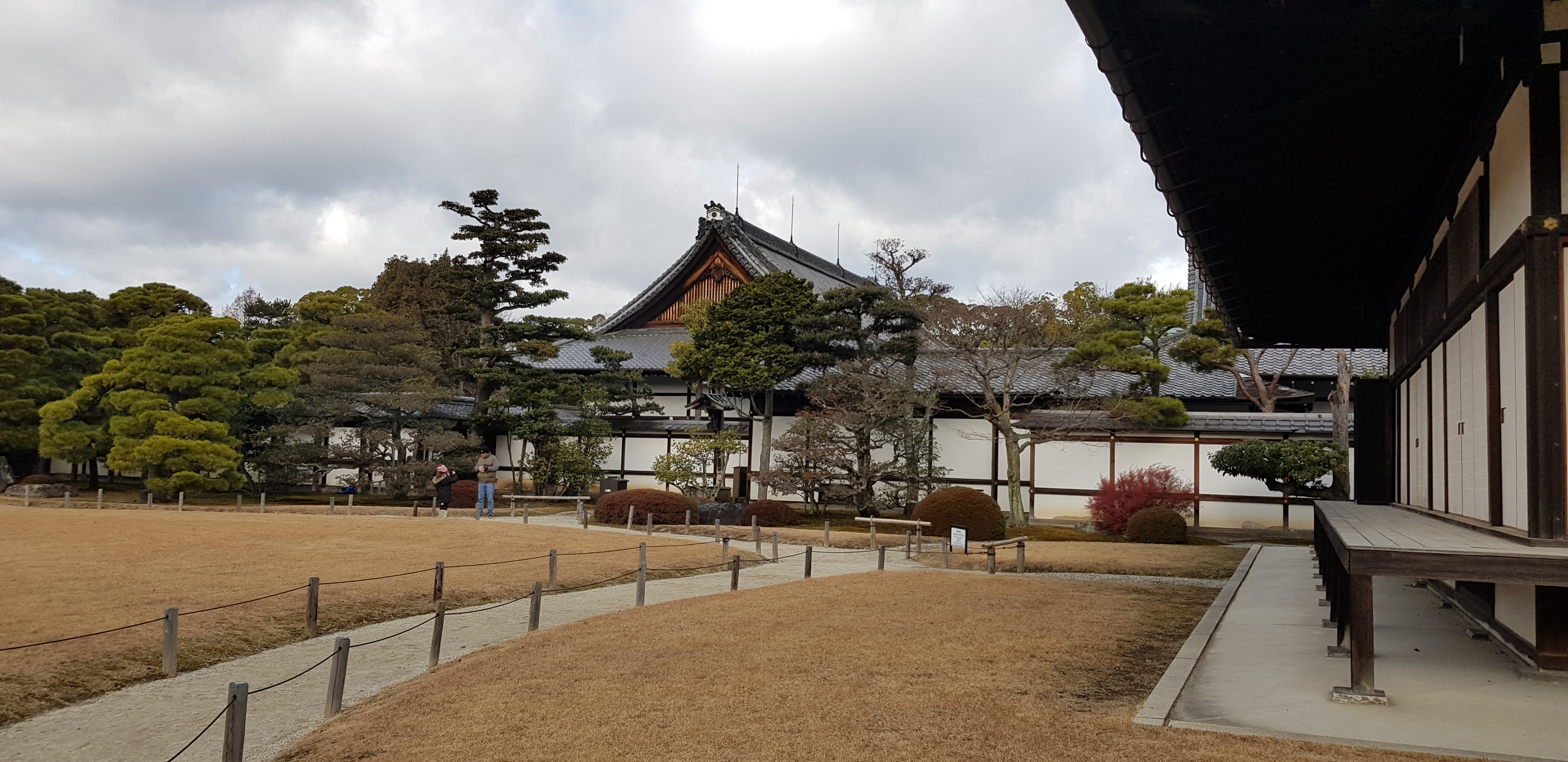
The Ninomaru Garden adjoining the Ninomaru Palace

The castle area has several gardens and groves of cherry and Japanese plum trees. The Ninomaru garden was designed by the landscape architect and tea master Kobori Enshū. It is located between the two main rings of fortifications, next to the palace of the same name. The garden has a large pond with three islands and features numerous carefully placed stones and topiary pine trees.

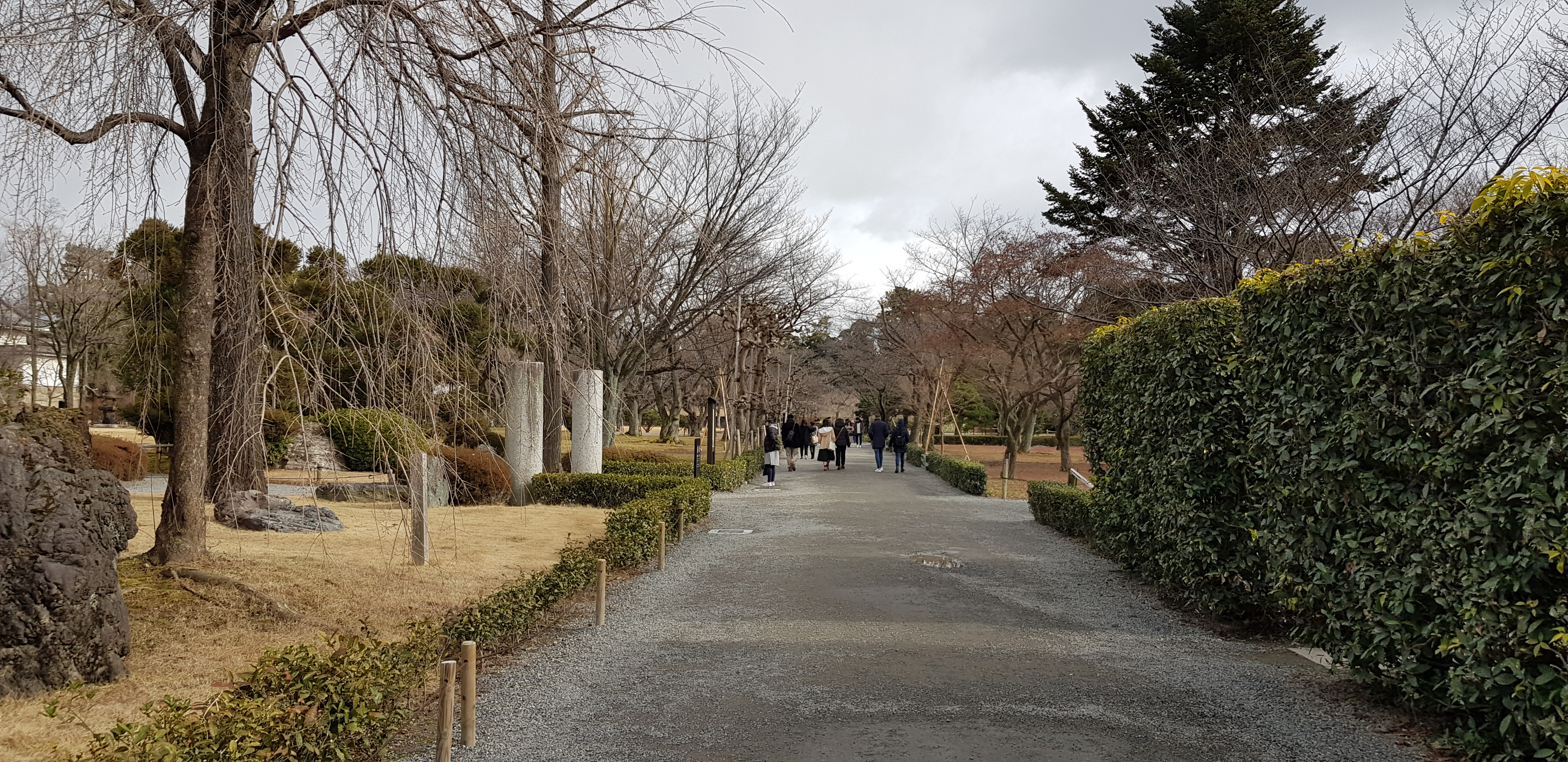
The Seiryu-en Garden

The Seiryū-en garden is the most recent part of Nijō Castle. It was constructed in 1965 in the northern part of the complex, as a facility for the reception of official guests of Kyoto and as a venue for cultural events. Seiryū-en has two tea houses and more than 1,000 carefully arranged stones.

== See also ==
- List of Special Places of Scenic Beauty, Special Historic Sites and Special Natural Monuments
- Historic Monuments of Ancient Kyoto (Kyoto, Uji and Otsu Cities)
- List of National Treasures of Japan (residences)
