= Kyoto Botanical Garden =

Botanical garden in Kyoto, Japan

Kyoto Botanical Gardens
- 京都府立植物園
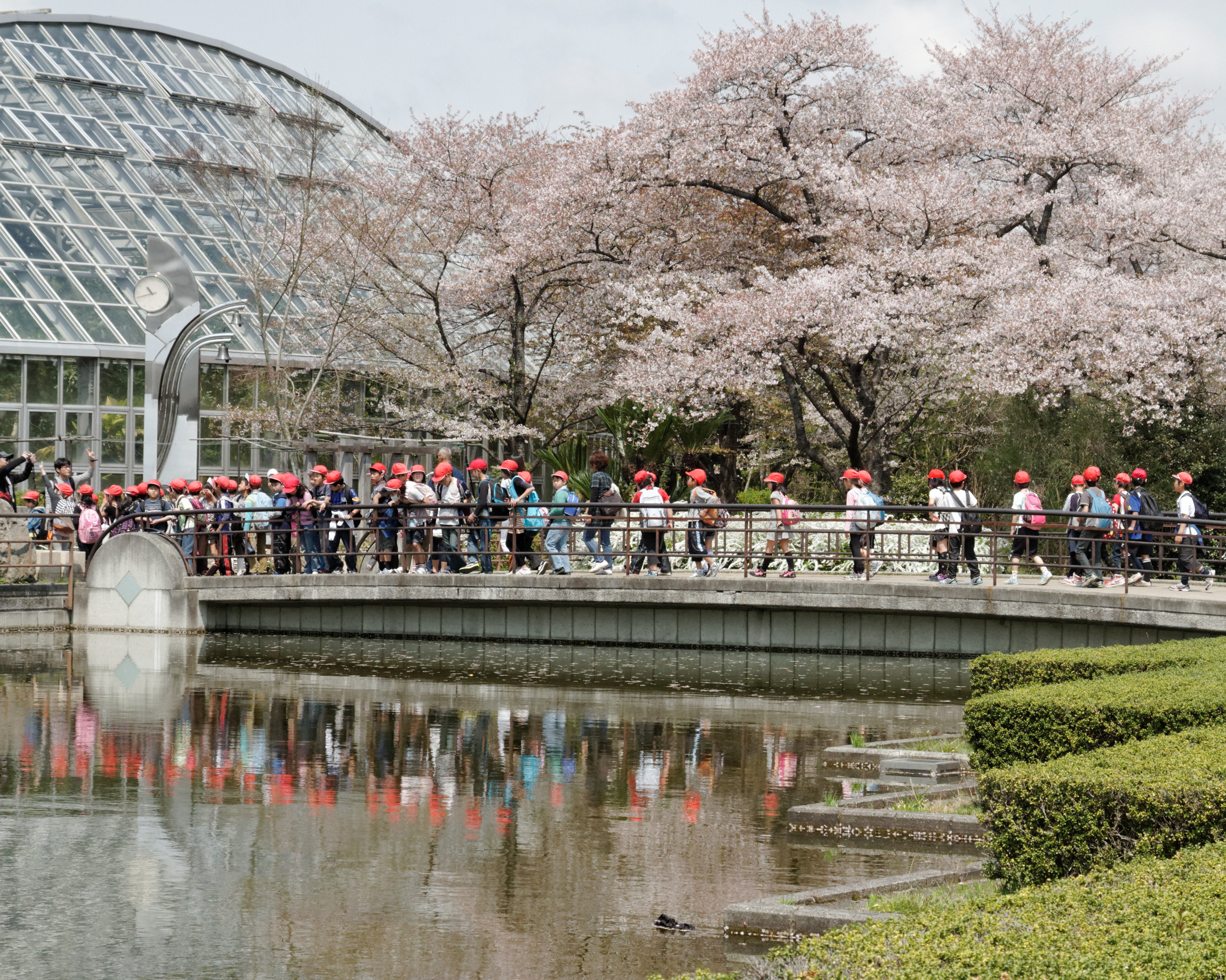
- Interactive map of Kyoto Botanical Gardens
- Location: Sakyō-ku, Kyoto, Japan
- Coordinates: 35°02′54″N 135°45′40″E
- Area: 24 hectares (59 acres)
- Established: January 1, 1924
- Operator: Kyoto Prefecture Government
- Visitors: 882,524 (in 2015)
- Open: 9am-5pm (Last entry at 4pm)
- Status: Closed from December 28 to January 4
- Species: 12,000
- Public transit: Kitayama Station (Kyoto Municipal Subway)
- Website: www.pref.kyoto.jp/en/02-02-10.html

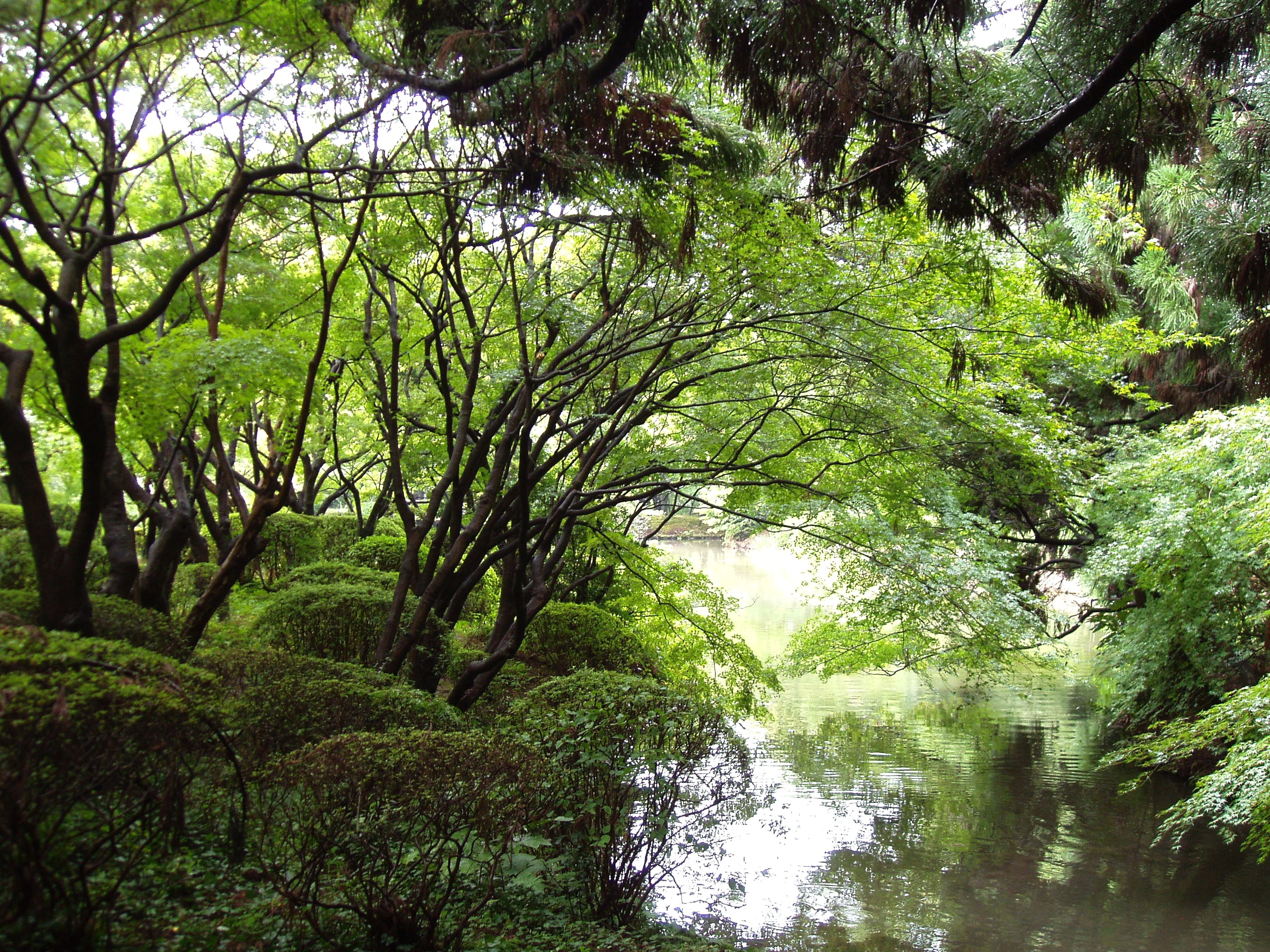
Kyoto Botanical Garden

The Kyoto Botanical Garden (京都府立植物園, Kyōto Furitsu Shokubutsuen; 240,000 m²), also known as the Kyoto Prefectural Botanical Garden, is a major botanical garden with conservatory located next to the Kamo River, Hangi-cho Simogamo, Sakyō-ku, Kyoto, Japan. It is open daily; a general admission fee is charged, and an additional fee is charged for accessing the conservatory.

The garden was first established in 1924. When World War II ended, the garden was designated a garrison by Occupation forces and was seized in 1946.

== Plants ==
As of 2007, it contains about 120,000 plants representing some 12,000 species and is organized into the following major areas: Bamboo Garden; Bonsai Exhibit; Camellia Garden; Cherry Trees; European Style Garden; Flower Bed; Hydrangea Garden; Japanese Iris Garden; Japanese Native Plants; Lotus Pond; Nakaragi-no-mori Pond (trees native to the Yamashiro Basin); Peony Garden; Perennial and Useful Plants Garden; Sunken Garden; and the Uma Grove.

The garden also contains a very substantial conservatory complex (4,694 m^{2}) containing about 25,000 specimens representing 4,500 species. It is a set of rooms shaped to resemble the nearby Kinkaku-ji Temple and Kyoto's northern mountains, built of glass with iron frames, and opened in 1992. It currently contains the following areas: Ananas Room; Aquatic and Carnivorous Plants; Bromeliads Room; Desert and Savanna Plants Room; Forest Succulent Plants Room; Jungle Zone; Orchids Room; Potted Plants Room; Tropical Alpine Plants Room; and Tropical Produce Room.

== Location and access ==
The garden is located in northern part of Kyoto city and accessible by public transports. Parking is also available for car and bicycle.

- Main gate
  - Metro: Gate 3, Kitaōji Station on Karasuma line
  - Bus stop: Botanical garden (in Japanese 植物園) on line 1, 204, 205, 206, N8 of Kyoto City Bus, and line 32, 34, 35, 45, 46 by Kyoto Bus.
- Kitayama gate
  - Metro: Gate 3, Kitayama station on Karasuma line.
- Kamogawa gate
  - Bus stop: Kitayama-bashi higashi-zume (in Japanese 北山橋東詰) on line N8 of Kyoto City Bus.
- Hokusen gate
  - Connected to Inamori Memorial Hall of Kyoto Prefectural University.

== Gallery ==
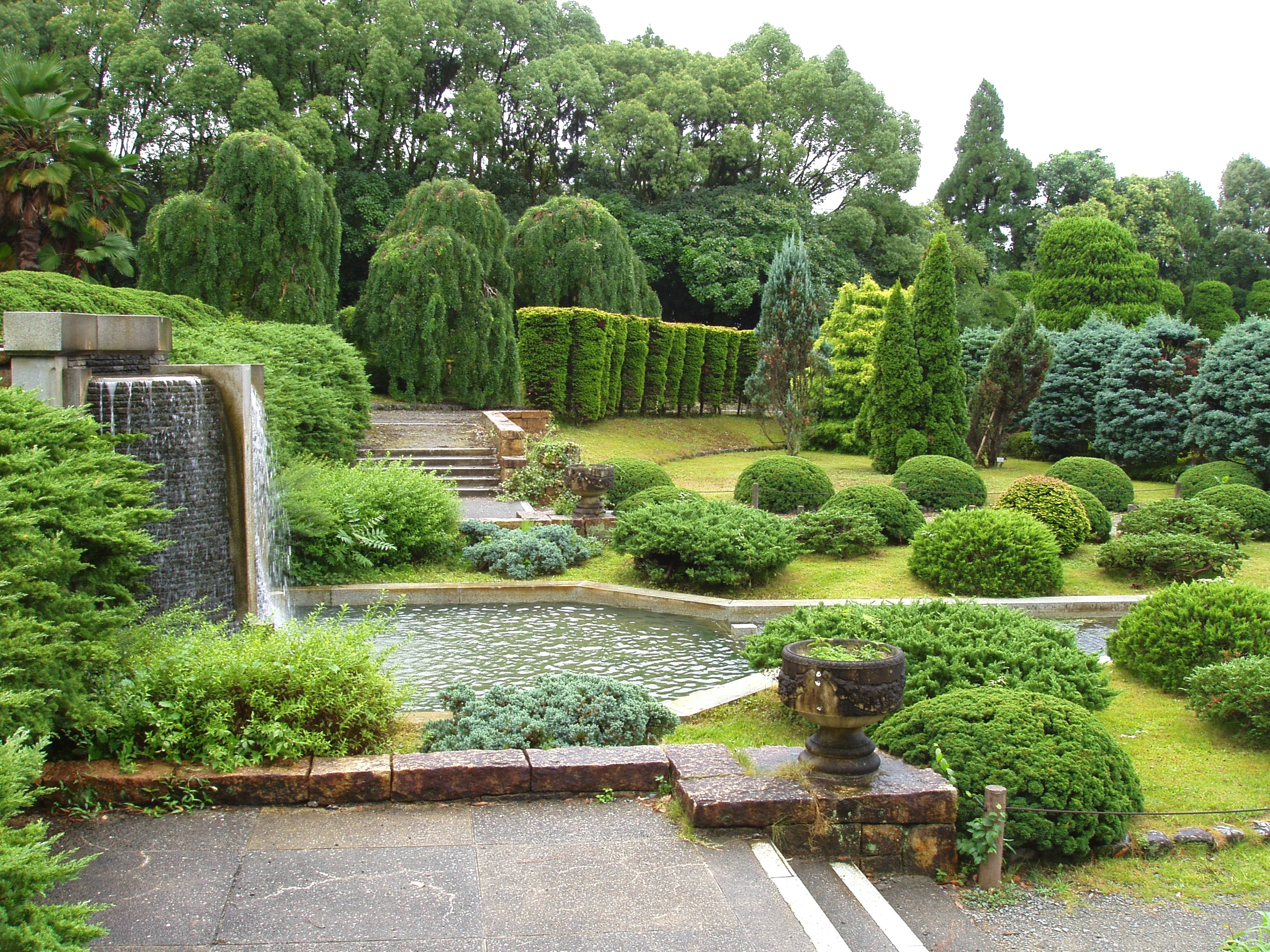
Sunken garden

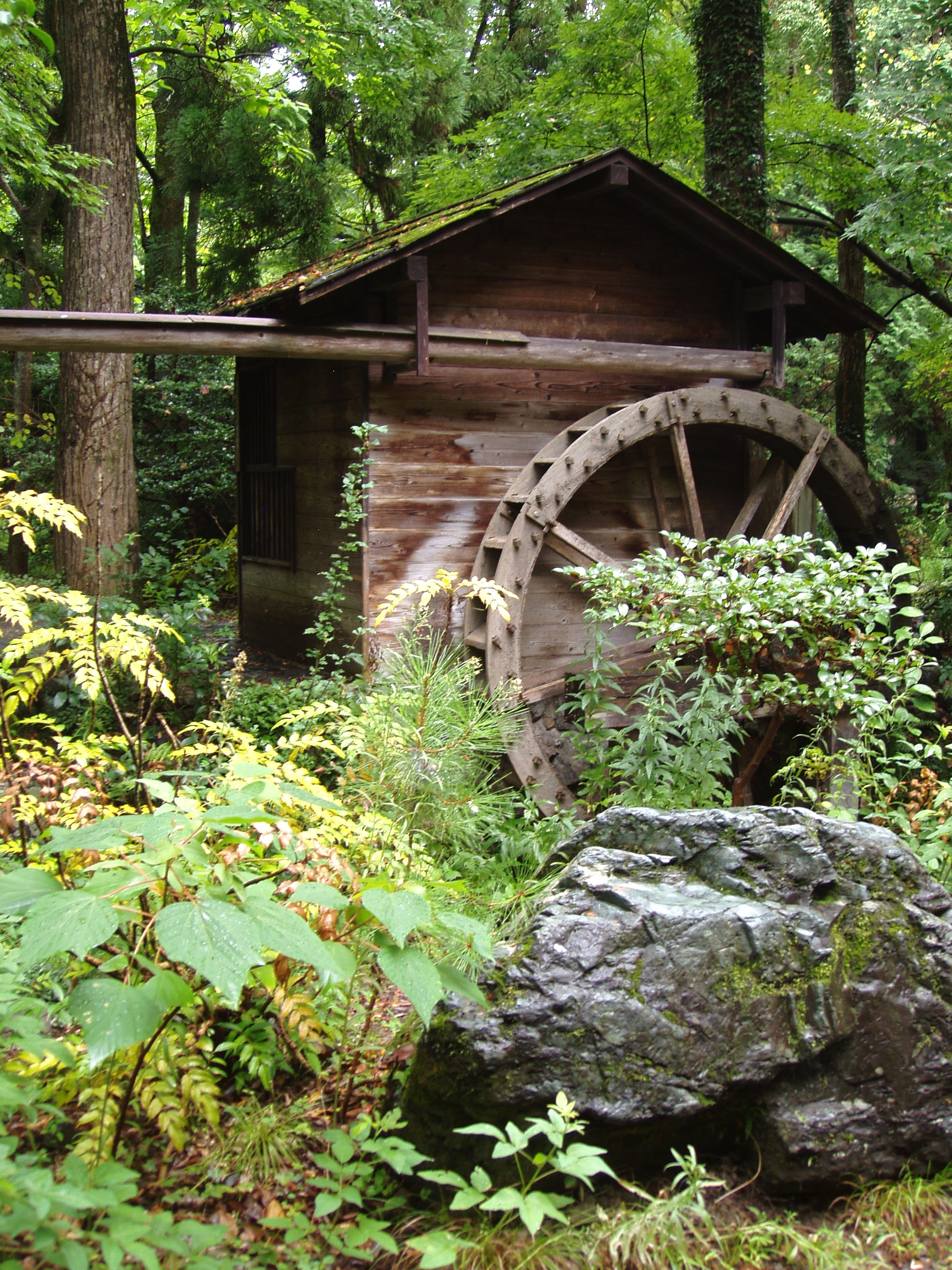
Water mill

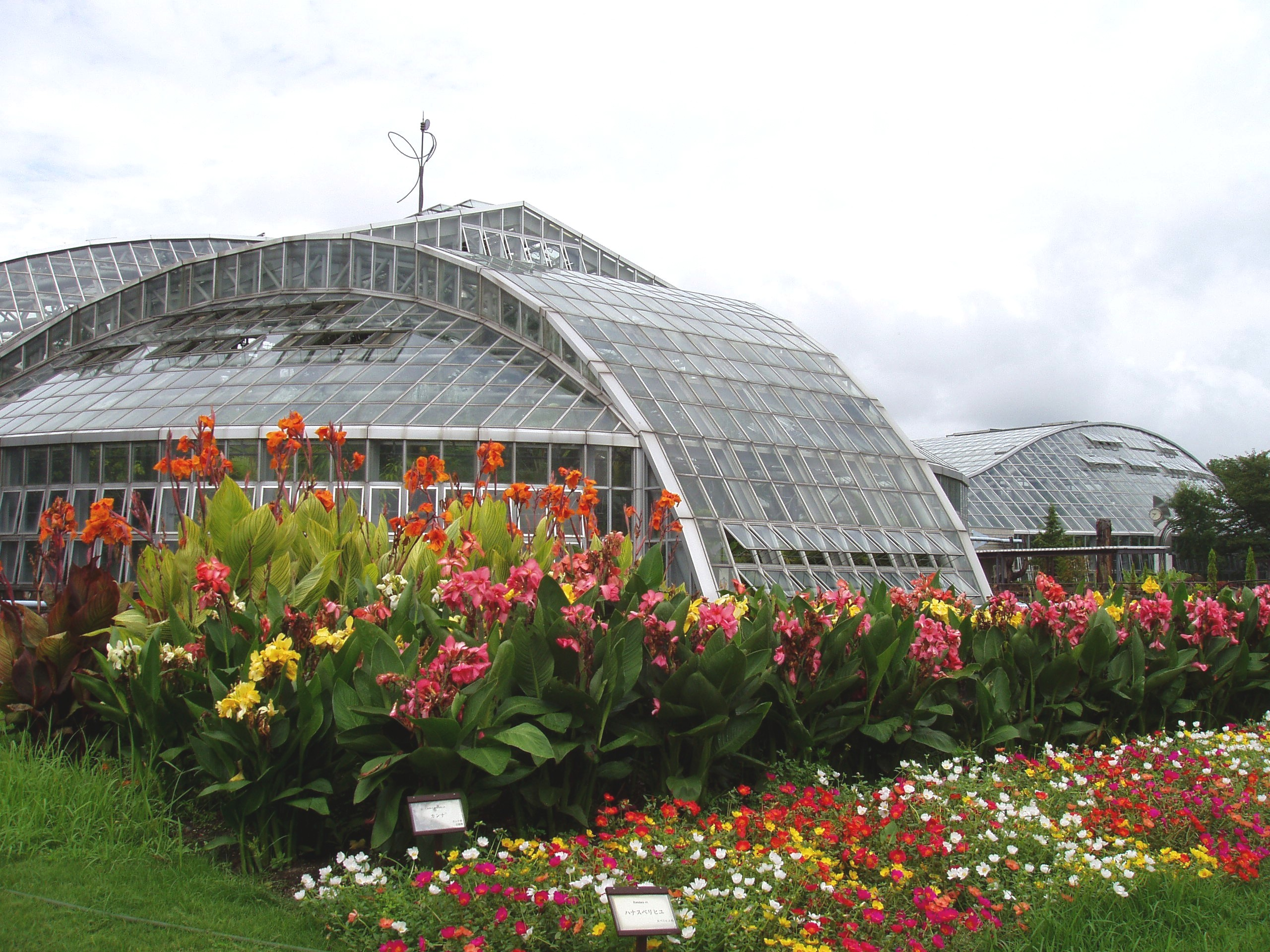
Conservatory

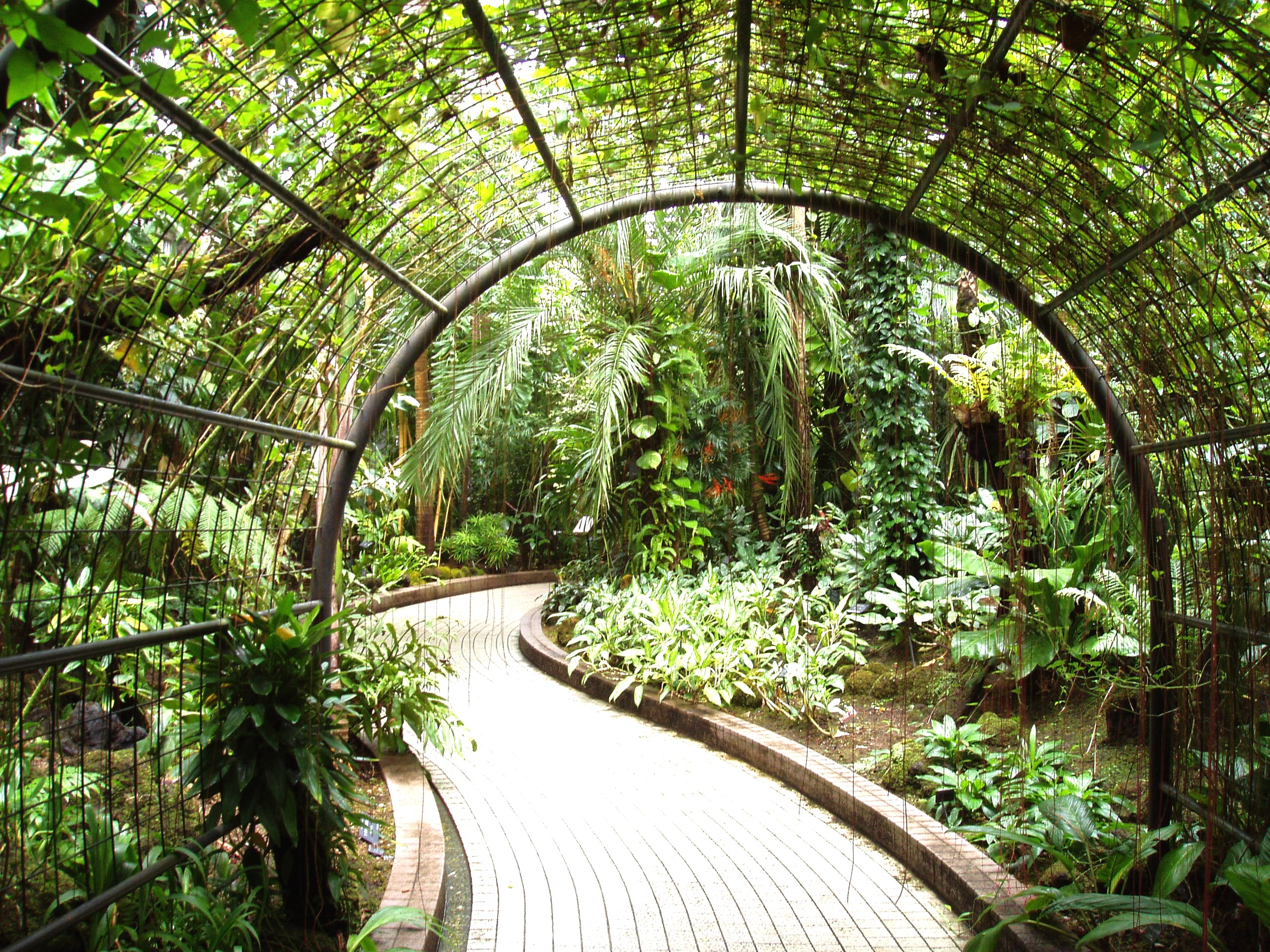
Conservatory (interior view)

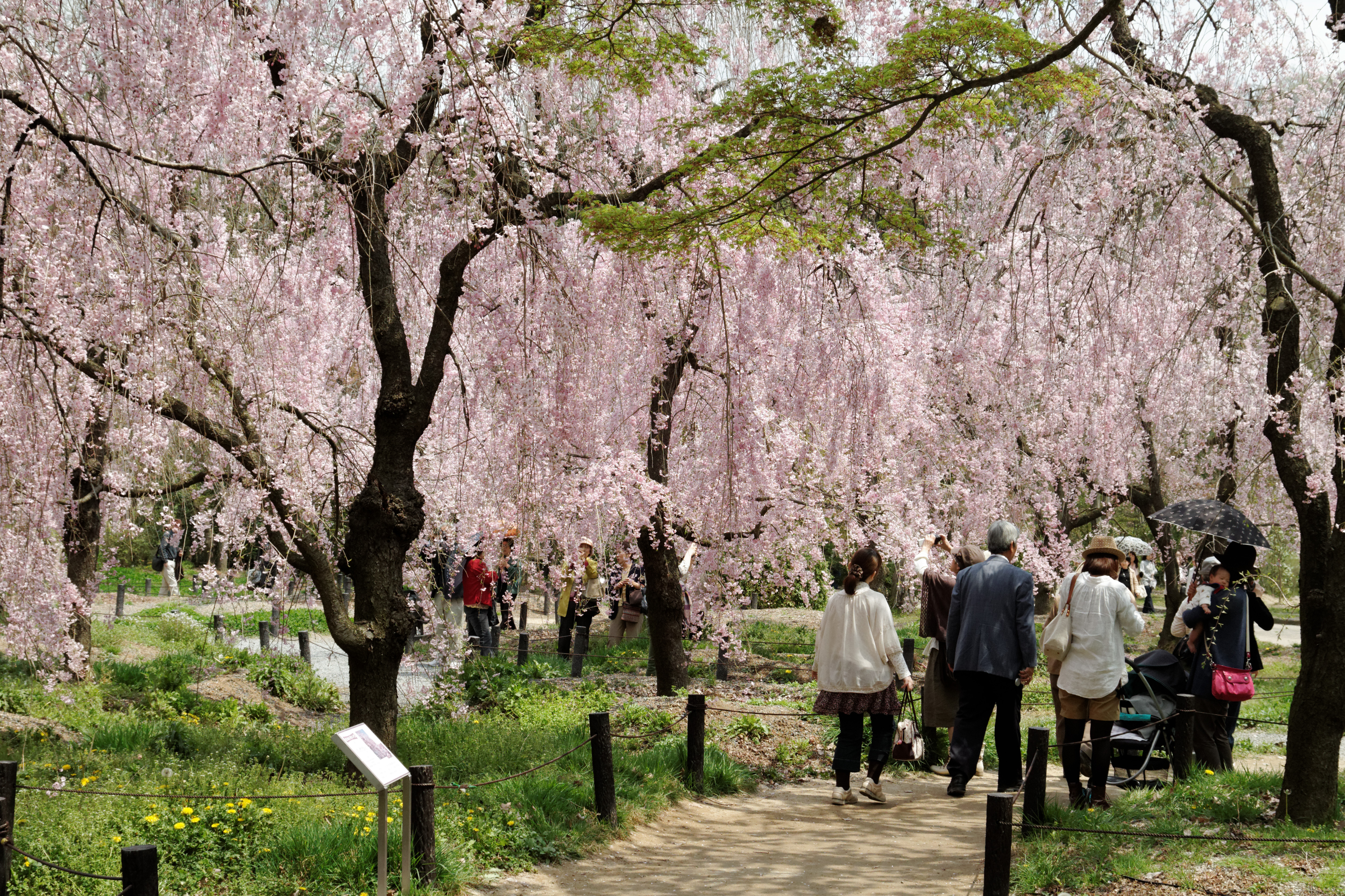
Weeping cherry (in Japanese, Shidare zakura; しだれ桜)

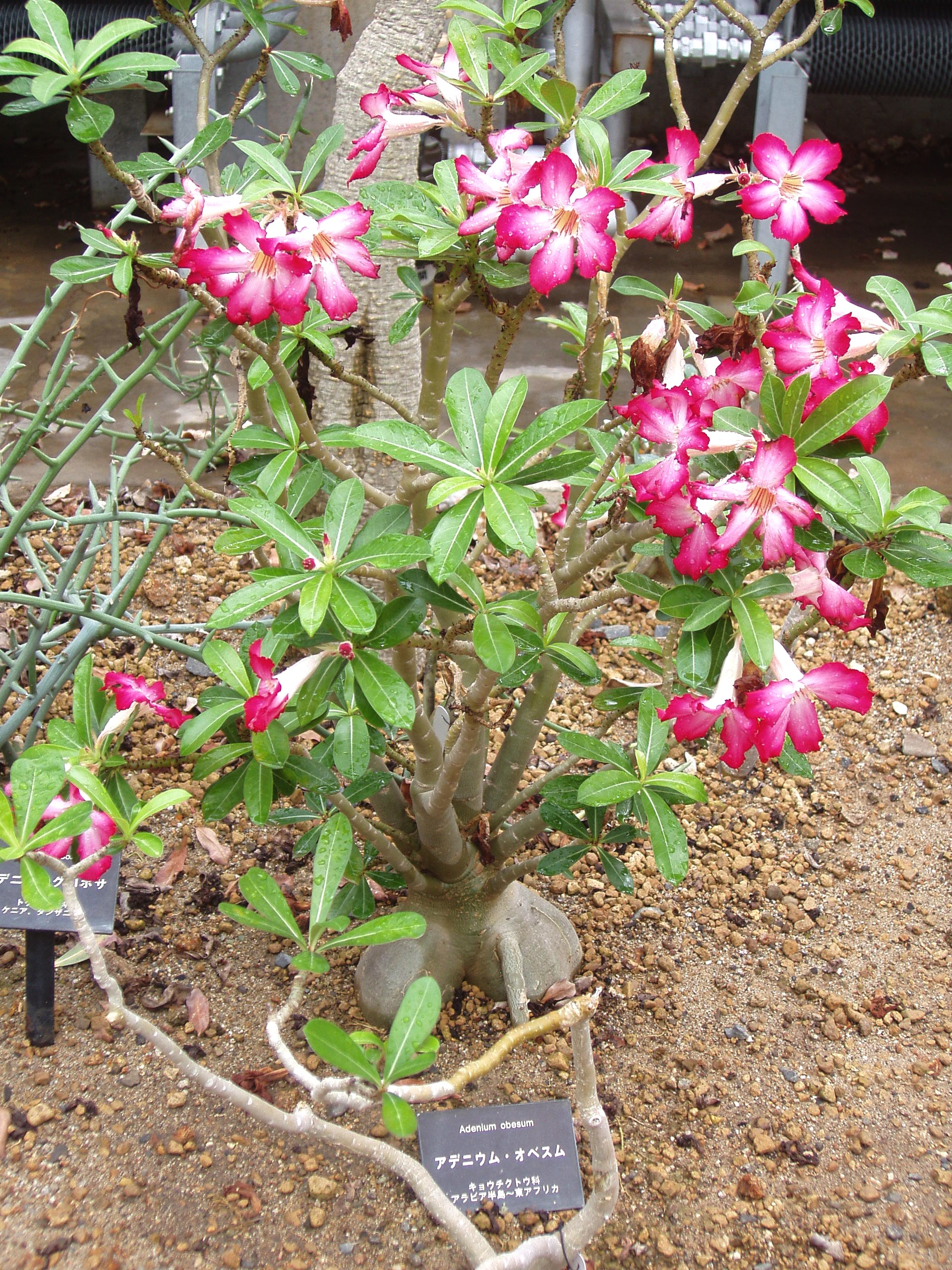
Adenium obesum

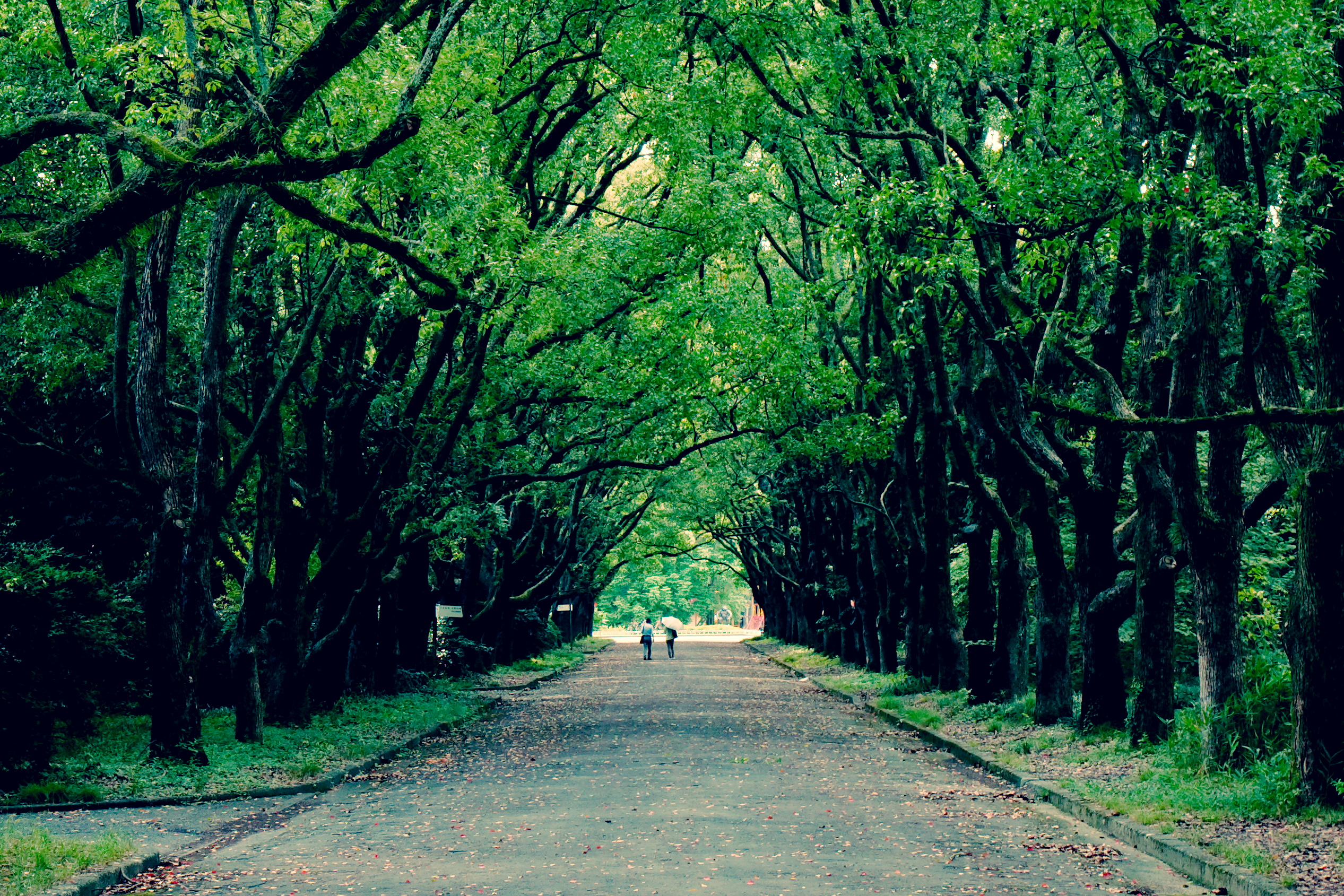
Avenue of Camphor trees (Kusuno-ki; 楠 in Japanese)

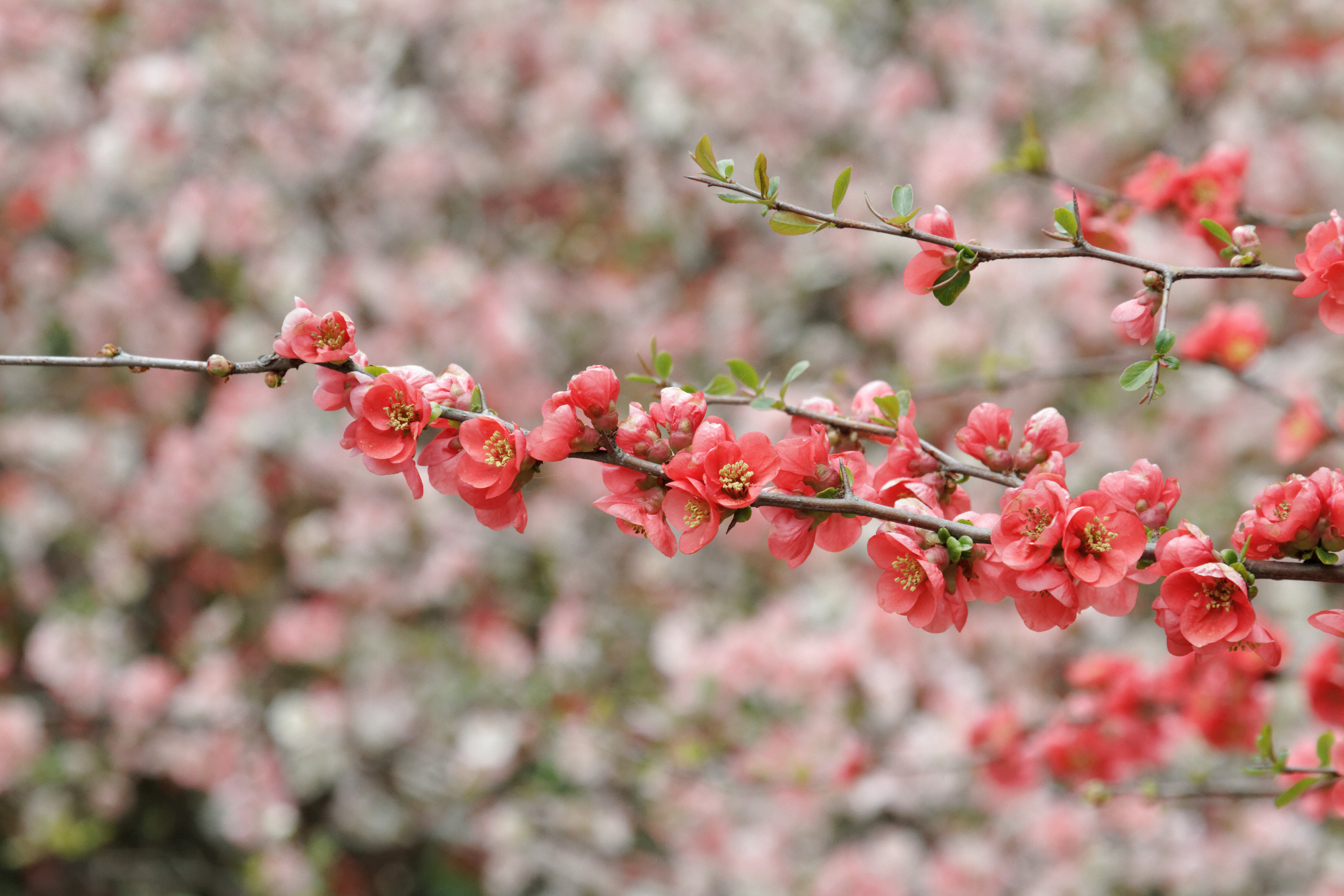
Ume, Japanese apricot, Prunus mume

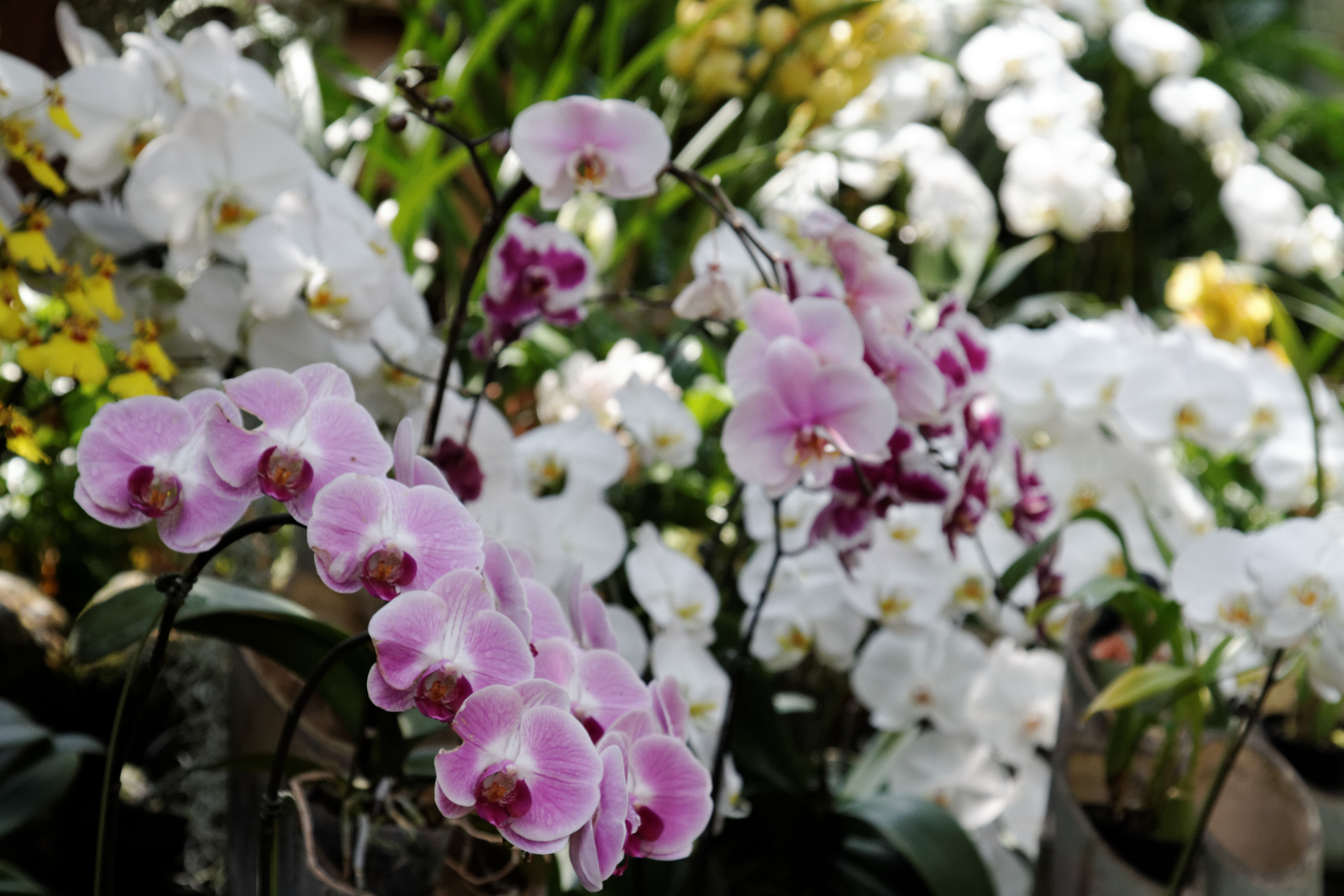
Orchids

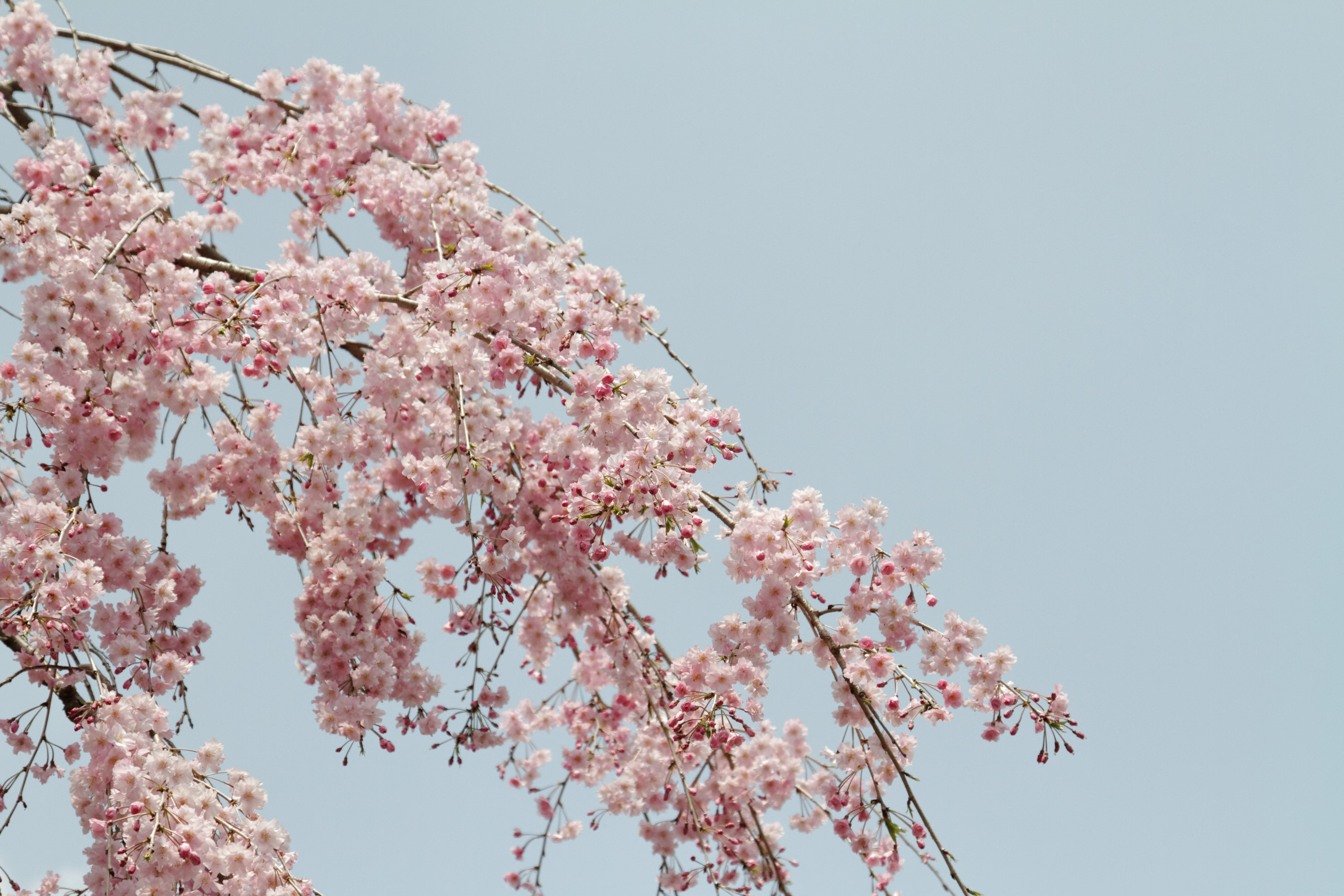
Cherry blossoms

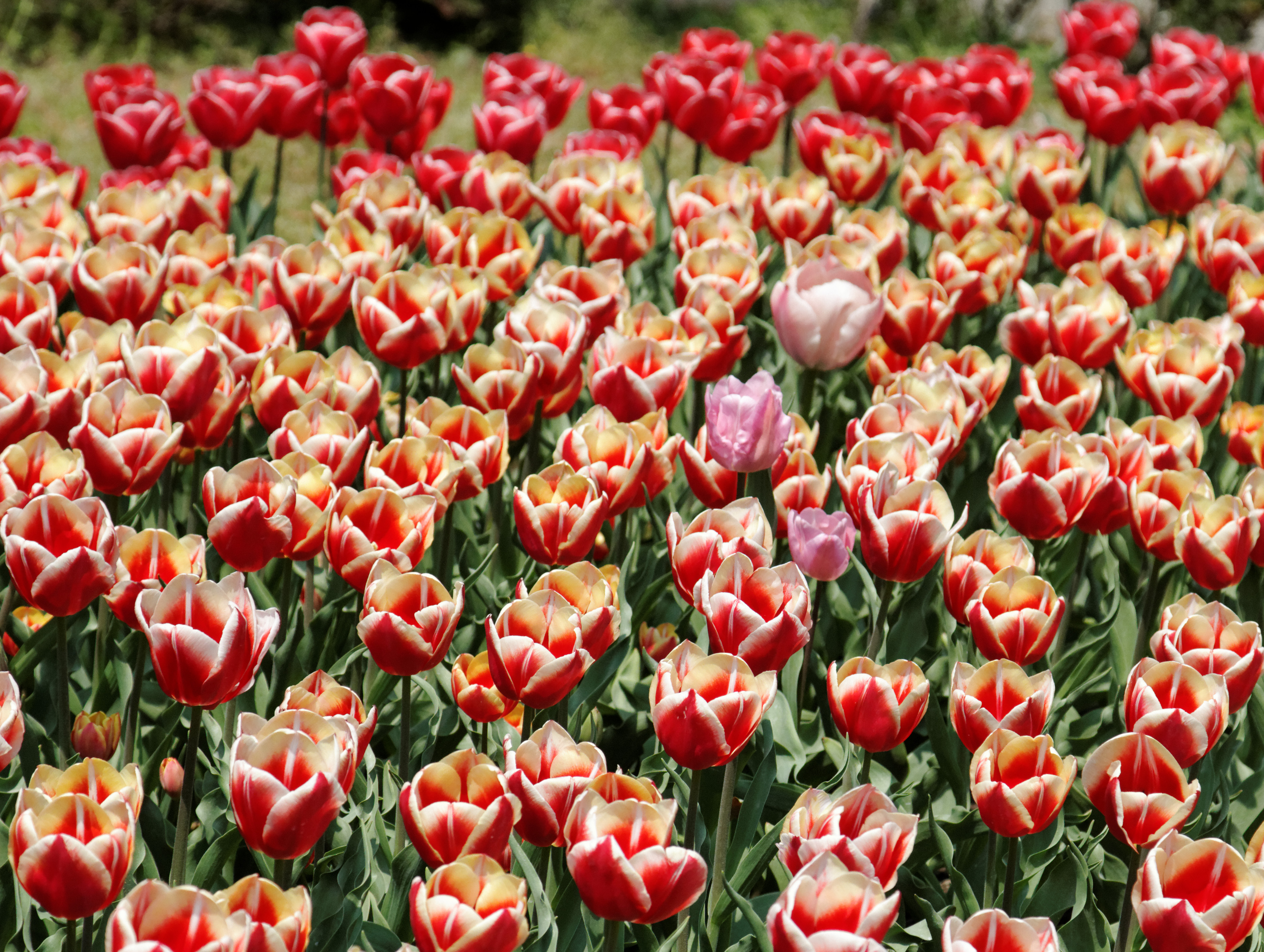
Tulips

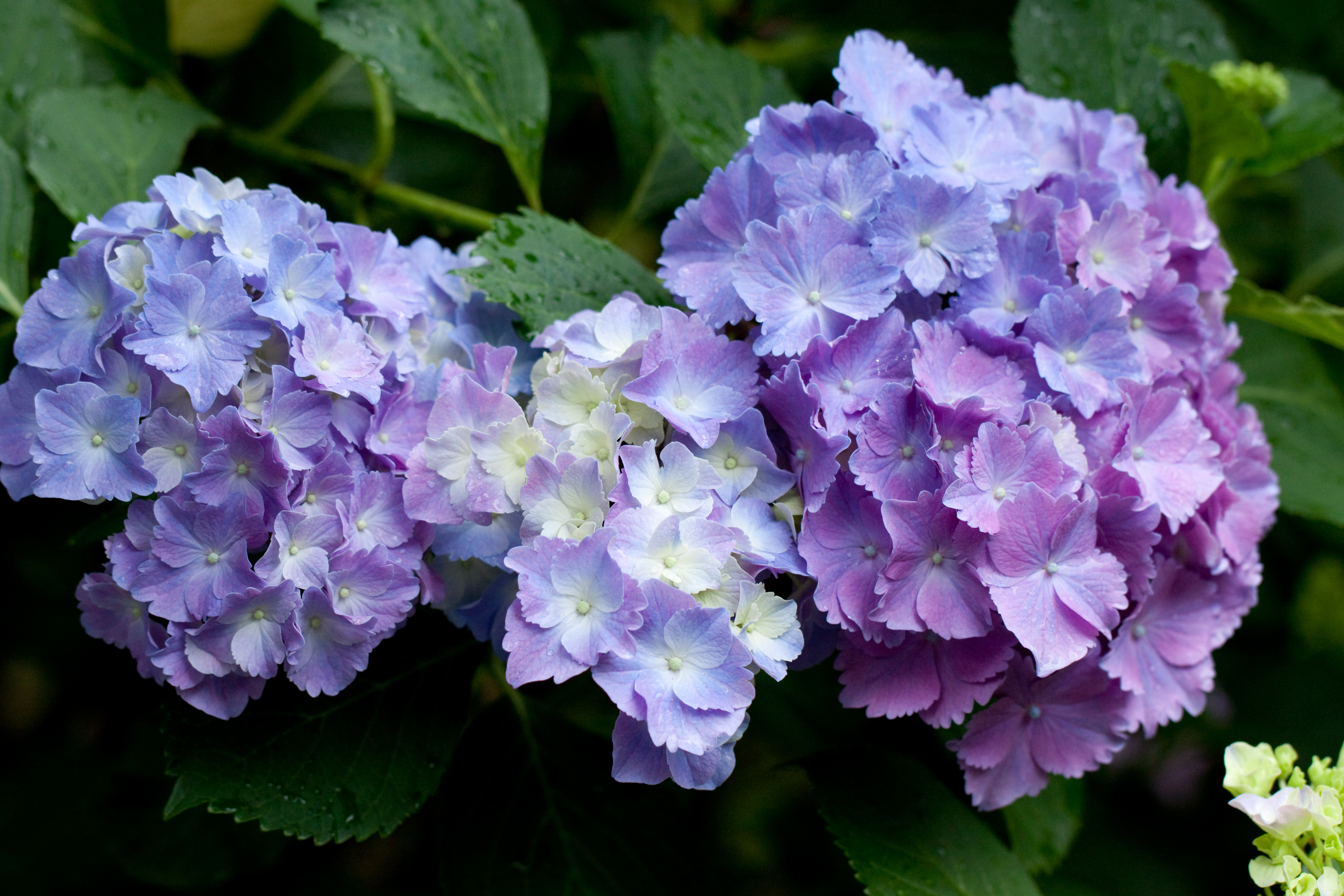
Hydrangea

== See also ==
- List of botanical gardens in Japan

== References and external links ==
- The Kyoto Botanical Garden (Guide Map), undated brochure, Kyoto Botanical Garden (August 2007)
- The Conservatory: The Kyoto Botanical Garden, undated brochure, Kyoto Botanical Garden (August 2007)
- Kyoto Botanical Gardens
