= Kitaōji Station =

Metro station in Kyoto, Japan

Coordinates: 35.0449°N 135.7589°E

K04 Kitaōji Station 北大路駅
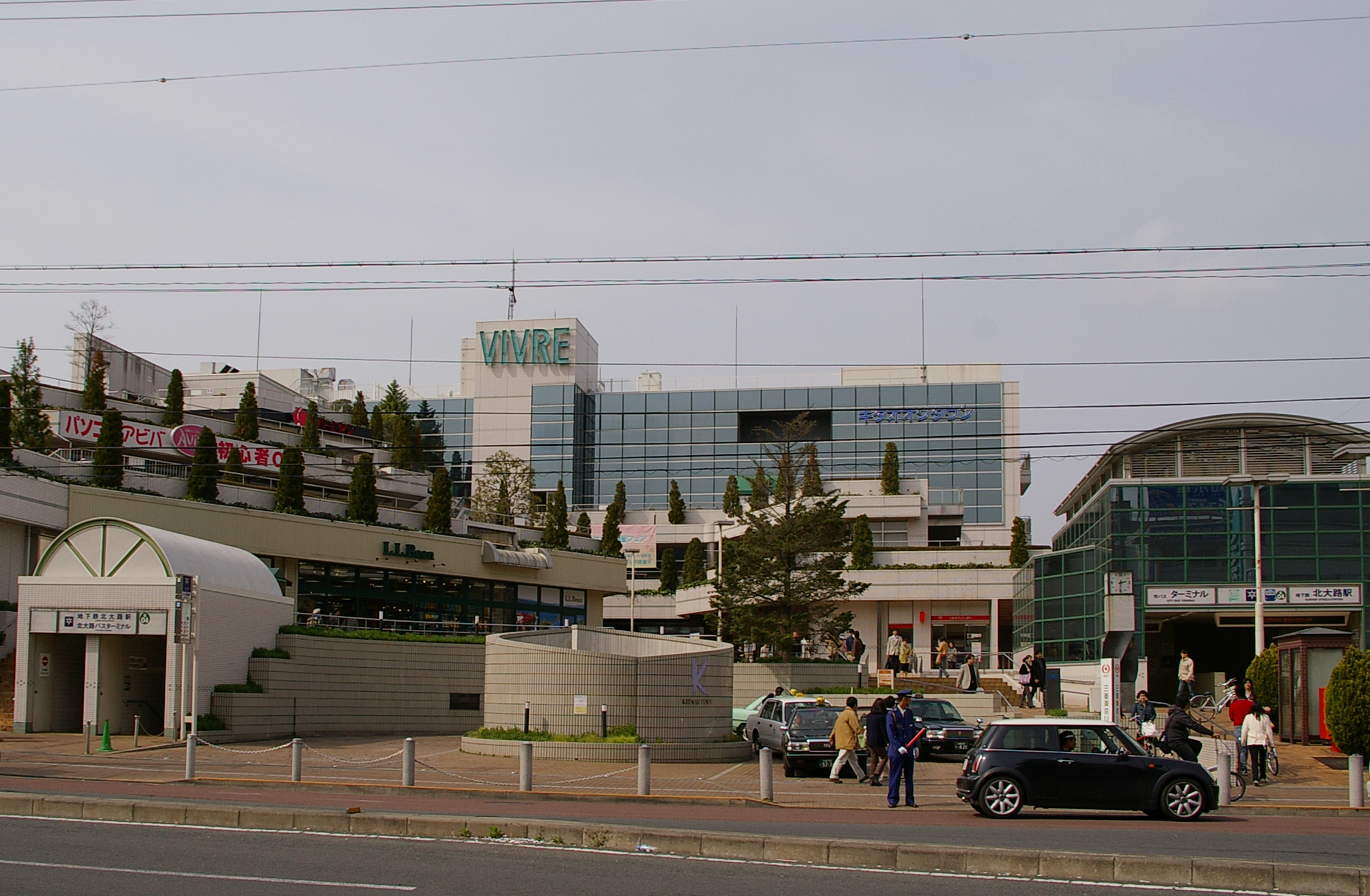
- Kitaōji Town commercial complex above the station

General information
- Location: Kita-ku, Kyoto; Japan
- Owner: Kyoto Municipal Transportation Bureau
- Operator: Kyoto Municipal Subway
- Line: Karasuma Line
- Platforms: 1 island platform
- Tracks: 2
- Connections: Bus terminal

Other information
- Station code: K04

History
- Opened: May 29, 1981; 45 years ago

Passengers
- FY2016: 30,328 daily

Services
Preceding station	Kyoto Municipal Subway	Following station
Kuramaguchi K05 towards Takeda	Karasuma Line	Kitayama K03 towards Kokusaikaikan
Location
- Location within Kyoto city Location within Japan

Kitaōji Station (北大路駅, Kitaōji-eki; station number: K04) is a railway station on the Kyoto Municipal Subway Karasuma Line in Kita-ku, Kyoto, Japan.

== History ==
The station opened on May 29, 1981 when the Karasuma Line started operation between Kitaōji and Kyoto. Until October 24, 1990, the station was the terminus of the line.

== Layout ==
This station has an island platform with two tracks under Karasuma Street.

=== Platforms ===
Platforms	Platform 1	Karasuma Line towards Kyoto, Takeda and Kintetsu Nara →
Platforms	Island platform, doors will open on the left
Platforms	Platform 2	← Karasuma Line towards Kitayama and Kokusaikaikan

== Surroundings ==
- Kitaōji Town
  - Kyoto City Kitaōji Bus Terminal
  - Kyoto North Hall
  - Kitaoji Vivre
- Otani University
- Ritsumeikan Primary School
- Kyoto Botanical Garden

=== Kyoto City Kitaōji Bus Terminal ===
- Bus Platform A for Kyoto Sangyo University
  - Route 北3 for Kamigamo Shrine and Kyoto Sangyo University
  - Non-stop buses to Kyoto Sangyo University
- Bus Platform B for Higashiyama Street and Takano
  - Route 204 for Takano and Ginkaku-ji via Shirakawa Street
  - Route 206 for Chion-in, Gion, Kiyomizu-dera and Kyoto Station via Higashiyama Street
- Bus Platform C for Kawaramachi Street
  - Route 1 for Rakuhoku High School, Shimogamo Shrine and Demachiyanagi
  - Route 37 for Shijo Kawaramachi and Sanjo Keihan via Kawaramachi Street
  - Route 205 for Rakuhoku High School, Shimogamo Shrine, Shijo Kawaramachi and Kyoto Station
- Bus Platform D for Takano and Shugakuin-michi
  - Route 北8 for Takano and Shugakuin-michi
- Bus Platform E for Sembon Kitaoji and Bukkyo University
  - Route 1 for Daitoku-ji and Bukkyo University
  - Extra route for Bukkyo University
  - Route 北1 for Bukkyo University and Gentaku
  - Route 37 for Nishigamo Depot via Horikawa Street
  - Route 特37 for Omiya Kotsu-koen and Nishigamo Depot
- Bus Platform F for Sembon and Nishioji
  - Route 101 Raku Bus for Daitoku-ji, Kinkaku-ji, Kitano Tenman-gu, Nijō Castle and Kyoto Station
  - Route 102 Raku Bus for Daitoku-ji, Kinkaku-ji, Kitano Tenman-gu and Ginkaku-ji
  - Route 205 for Daitoku-ji, Kinkaku-ji and Nishioji Shijo via Nishioji Street
  - Route M1 for Haradani
  - Route M1 for Ritsumeikan University
  - Route 北8 for Bukkyo University and Matsugasaki
- Bus Platform G for Sembon and Nishioji
  - Route 204 for Daitoku-ji, Kinkaku-ji and Nishinokyo Emmachi via Nishioji Street
  - Route 206 for Shijo-Omiya and Kyoto Station via Sembon Street

=== Karasuma Kitaōji Intersection ===
- Kyoto City Bus (Karasuma Kitaōji)
  - Route 1 for Demachiyanagi via Shimogamo Shrine / for Bukkyo University and Nishigamo Depot
  - Route 37 for Shijo Kawaramachi and Sanjo Keihan via Kawaramachi Street / for Kitaoji Bus Terminal and Nishigamo Depot
  - Route 204 for Takano and Ginkaku-ji via Shirakawa Street / for Daitoku-ji, Kinkaku-ji and Nishinokyo Emmachi via Nishioji Street
  - Route 205 for Shijo Kawaramachi and Kyoto Station via Kawaramachi Street / for Daitoku-ji, Kinkaku-ji and Nishioji Shijo via Nishioji Street
  - Route 206 for Chion-in, Gion, Kiyomizu-dera and Kyoto Station via Higashiyama Street / for Shijo-Omiya, Kyoto Aquarium and Kyoto Station via Sembon Street
  - Route 北3 for Kyoto Sangyo University
  - Route 北8 for Takano and Shugakuin-michi
- Kyoto Bus (Kitaōji Ekimae)
  - Route 30 and Express Route 36 for Demachiyanagi via Izumojibashi
  - Route 32 for Hirogawara via Kibuneguchi, Kurama and Hanasetoge / for Demachiyanagi via Takanobashi-higashizume
  - Route 34 for Shizuhara and Shiroyama via Kyoto Sangyo University / for Demachiyanagi via Takanobashi-higashizume
  - Route 35 for Ichihara via Kyoto Sangyo University / for Demachiyanagi via Takanobashi-higashizume
  - Route 45 for Kyoto Station via Karasuma Street / for Iwakura-Muramatsu via Rakuhoku University and Midorogaike
  - Route 46 for Iwakura-Muramatsu via Rakuhoku University and Midorogaike
- Kumogahata Bus Mokumoku-go (Kitaōji Ekimae)
  - for Kumogahata (2 roundtrips per day, between Kitaoji Ekimae and Kumogahata Iwayabashi)
