= Matsugasaki Station (Kyoto) =

Metro station in Kyoto, Japan

K02 Matsugasaki Station 松ヶ崎駅
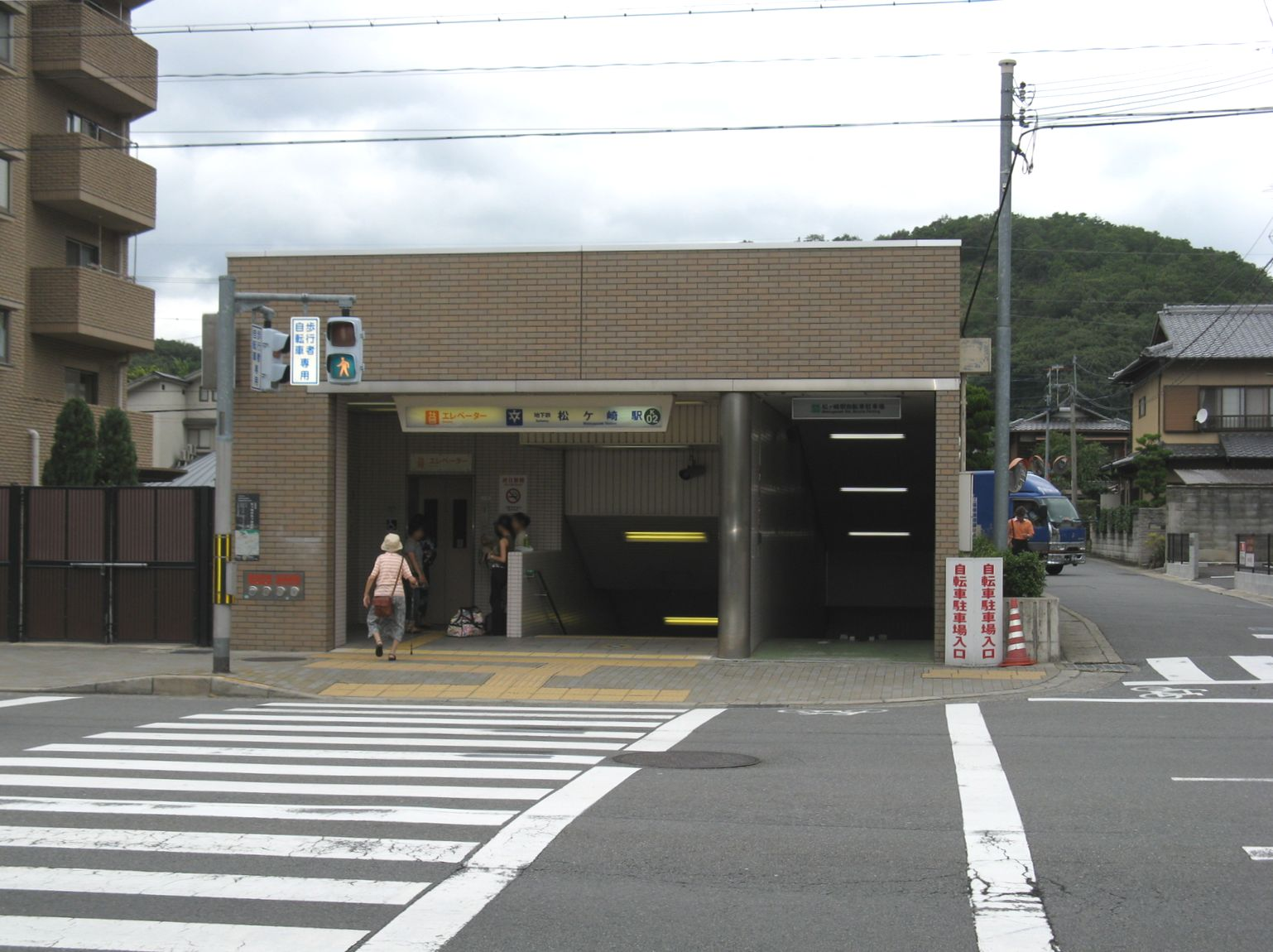
- Matsugasaki Station

General information
- Location: Matsugasaki Rokunotsubo-cho, Sakyo-ku, Kyoto, Kyoto （京都府京都市左京区松ヶ崎六ノ坪町） Japan
- Coordinates: 35°03′06″N 135°46′38″E
- Operator: Kyoto Municipal Subway
- Line: Karasuma Line
- Platforms: 1 island platform
- Tracks: 2
- Connections: Bus stop

Other information
- Station code: K02

History
- Opened: 1997; 29 years ago

Passengers
- FY2016: 11,786 daily

Services
Preceding station	Kyoto Municipal Subway	Following station
Kitayama K03 towards Takeda	Karasuma Line	Kokusaikaikan K01 Terminus
Location

Matsugasaki Station (松ヶ崎駅, Matsugasaki-eki) is a train station on the Kyoto Municipal Subway Karasuma Line in Sakyo-ku, Kyoto, Japan.

== Layout ==
The station locates underneath Kitayama dori street, all station structures except stairs are underground. The station has two floors, the upper one is the station office and ticket gates and lower one is an island platform with two tracks. The station has two stairs to access outside, the first stairs are on East side and the second is in West. East one is with escalators while West is with a lift. West one is with bicycle parking lots.

Pictures of Matsugasaki station

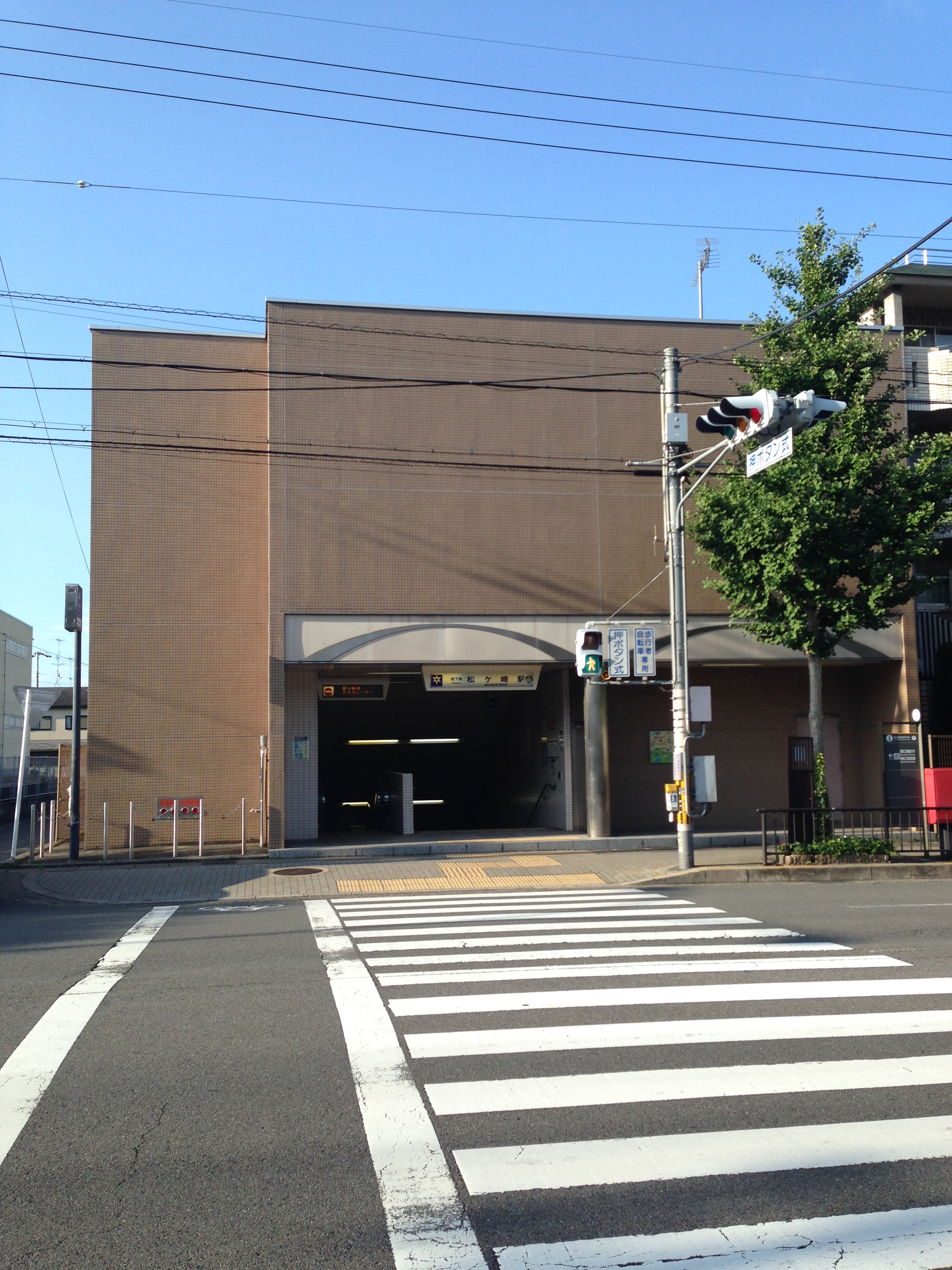
First stairs

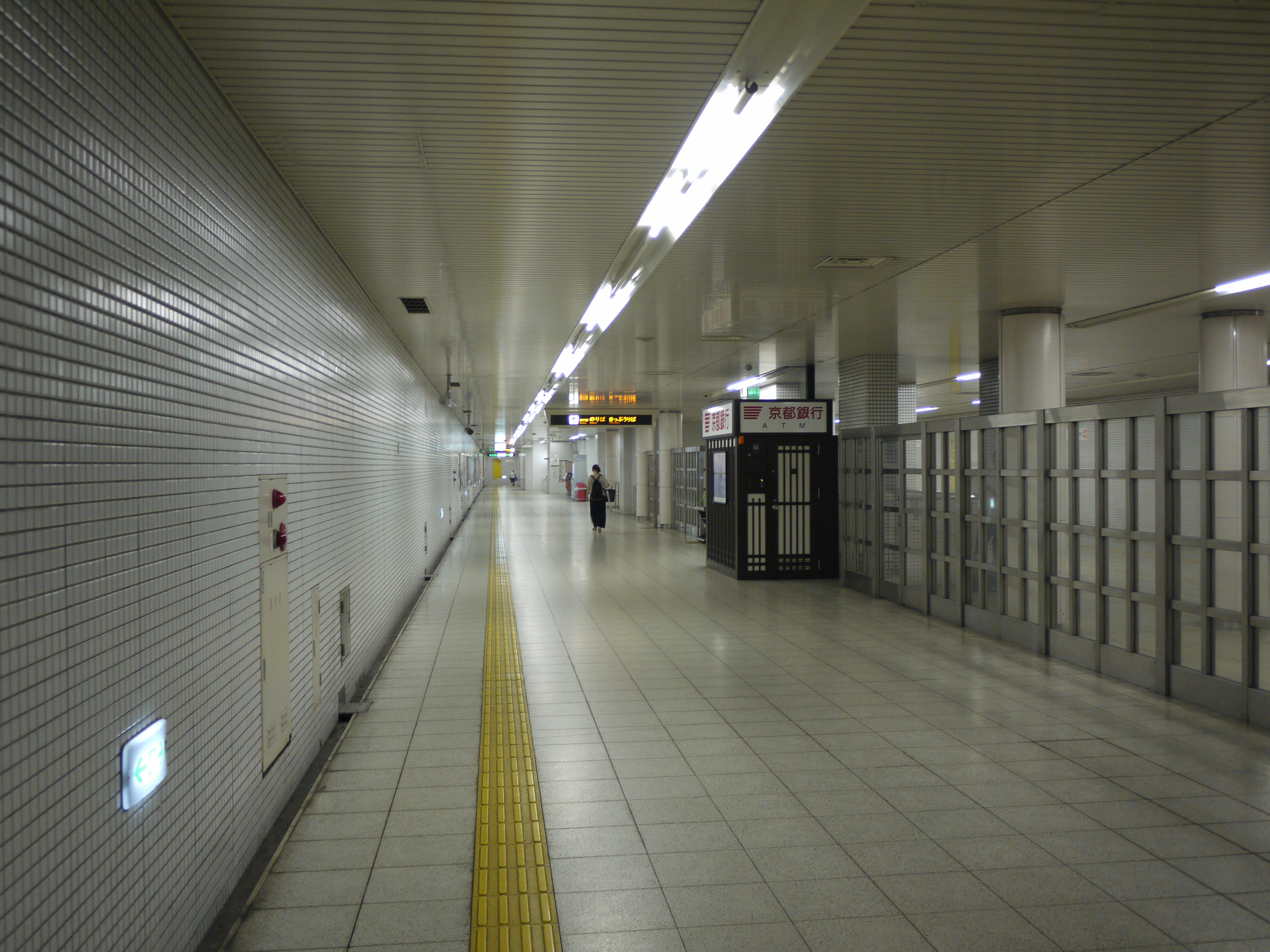
Concourse outside ticket gates

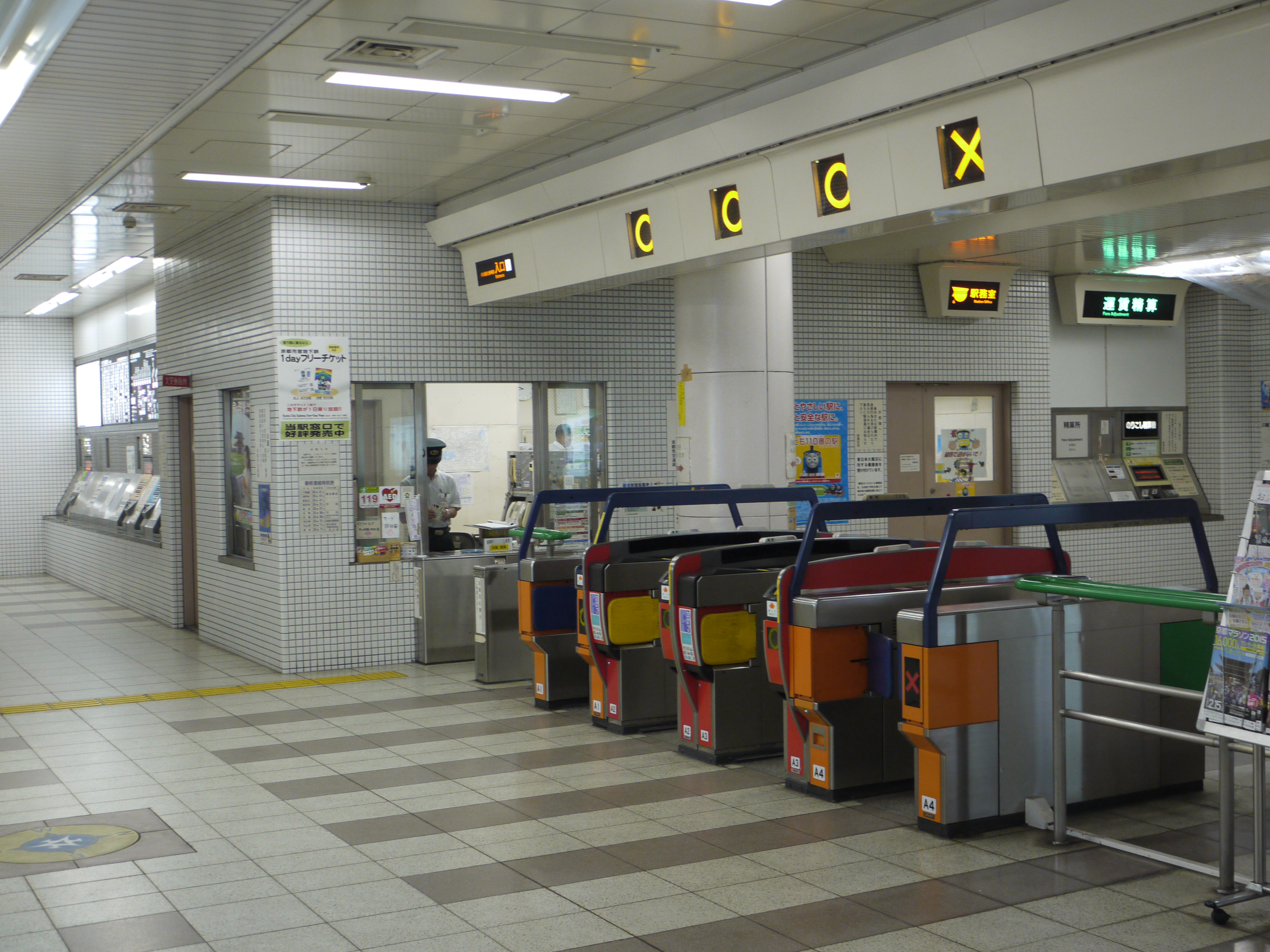
Ticket gates
IC cards can be used。

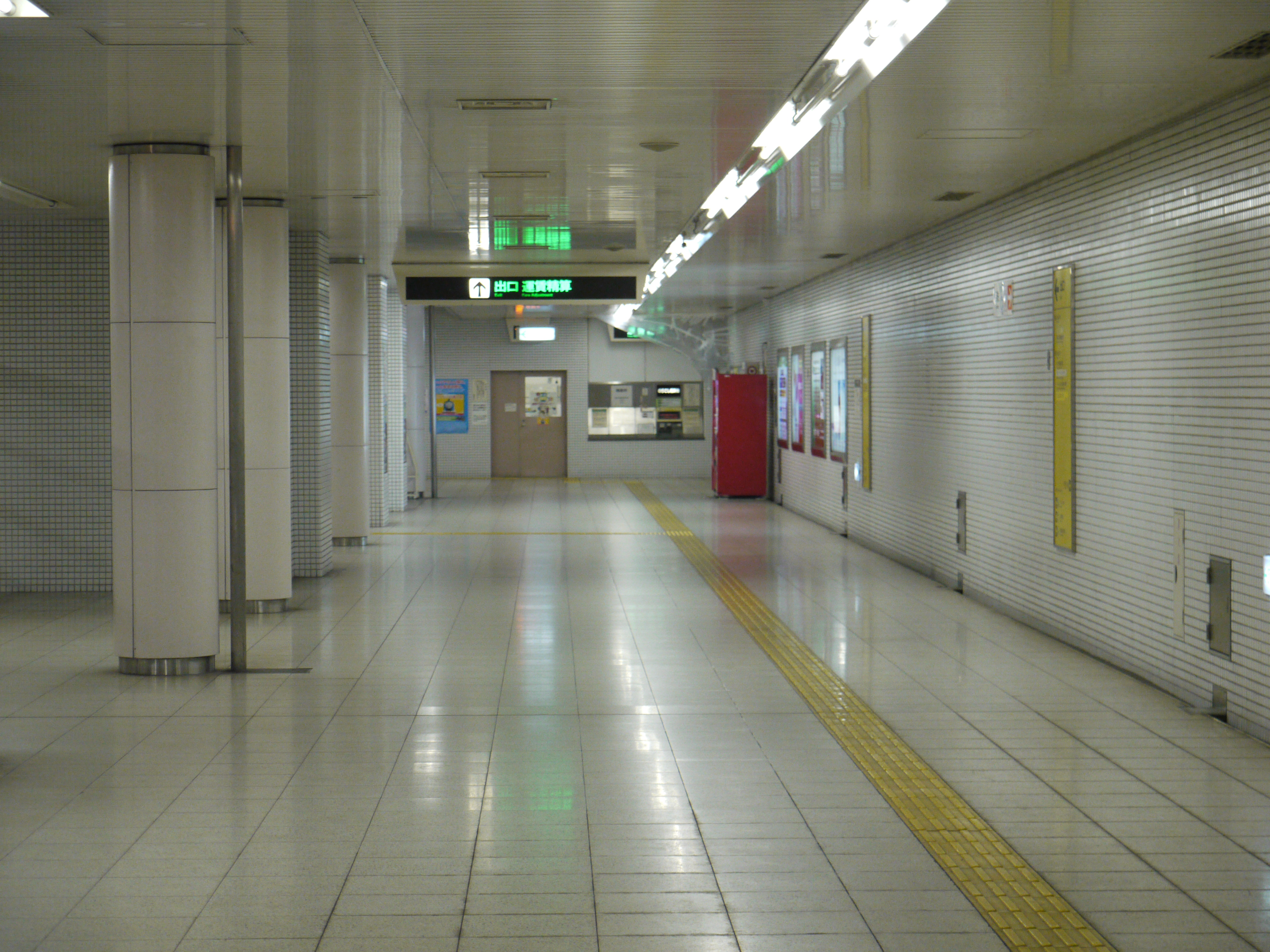
Concourse inside ticket gates

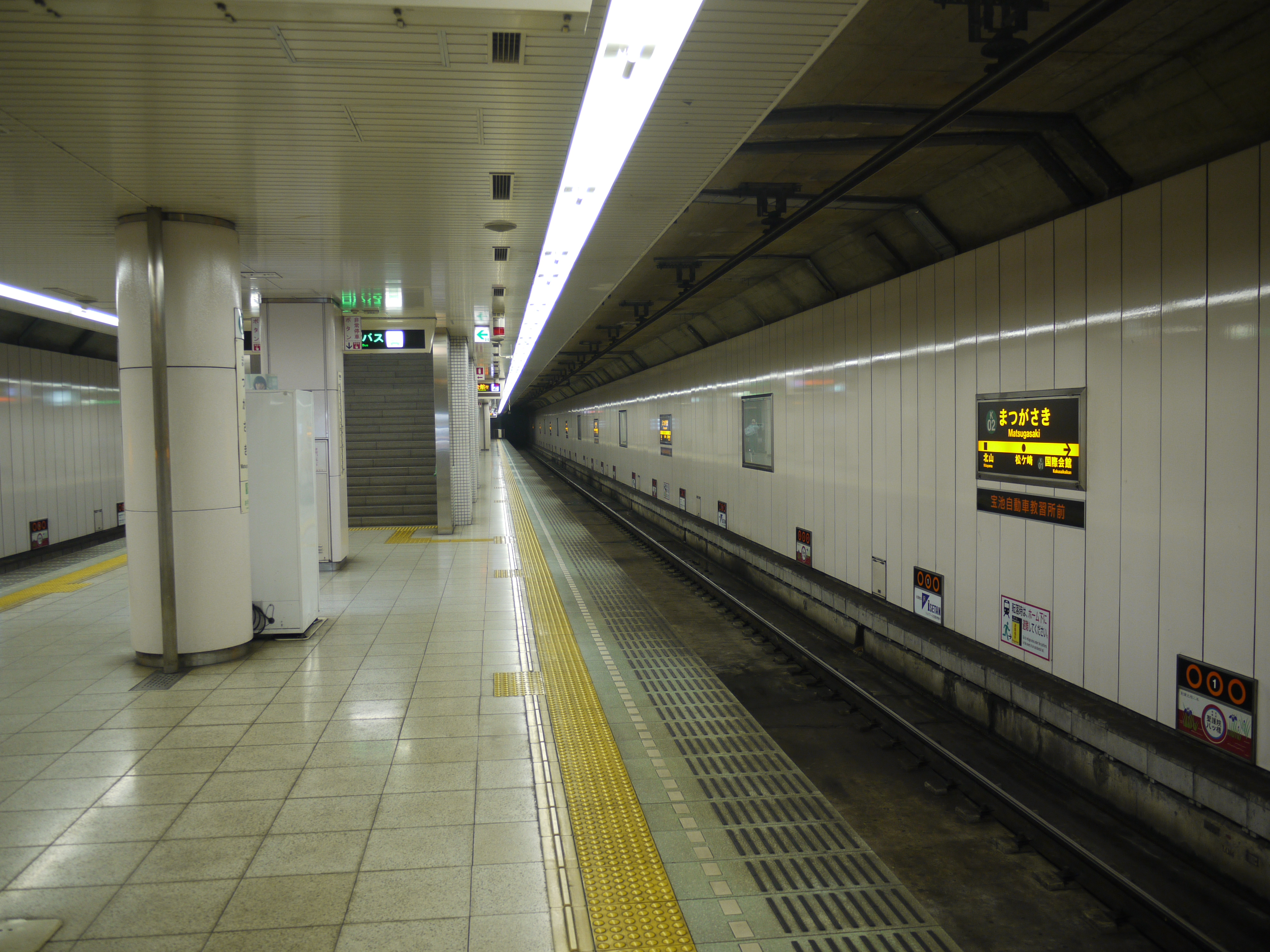
Platforms

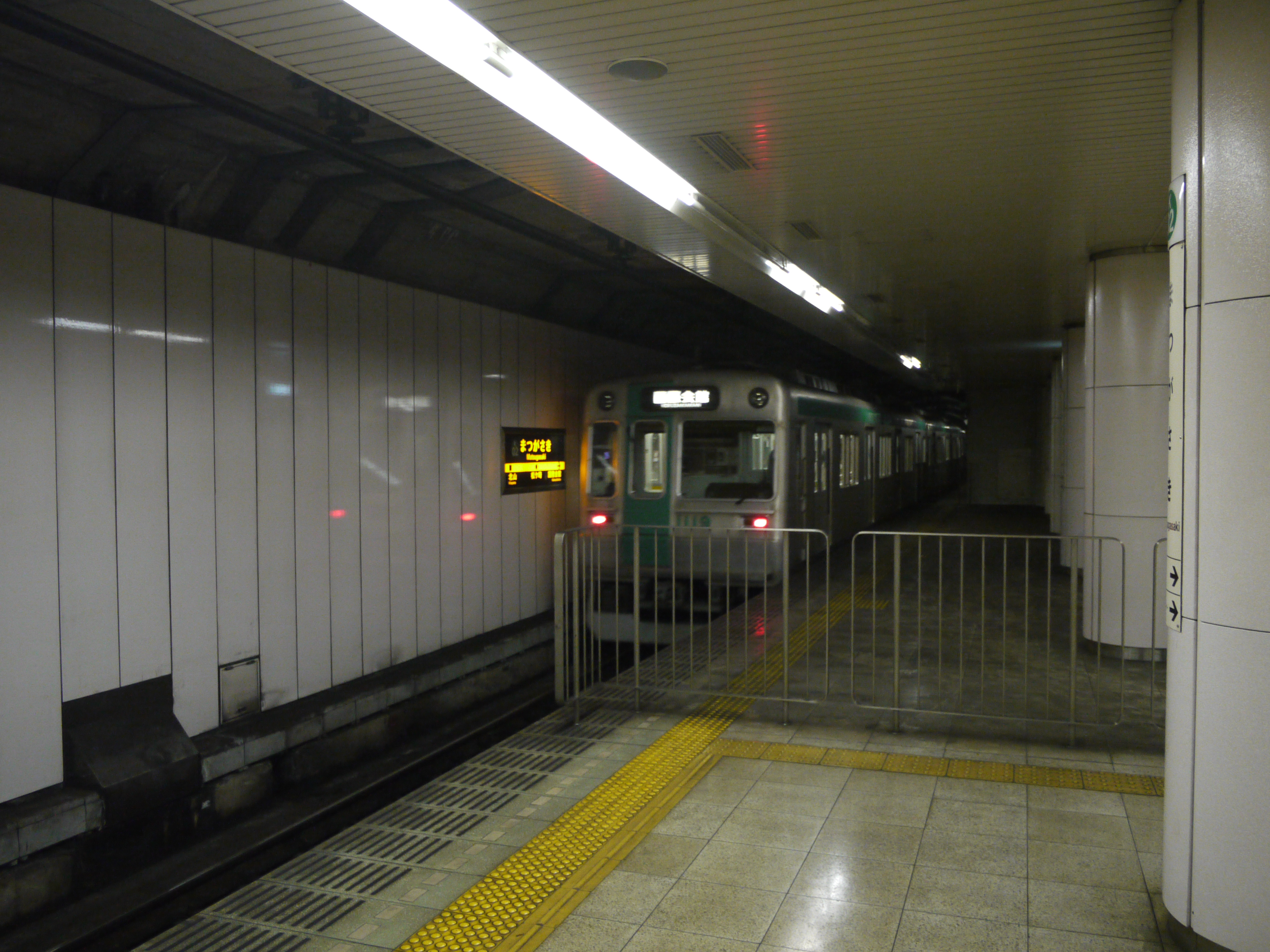
Each end of platforms equivalent to one train carriages is not used.

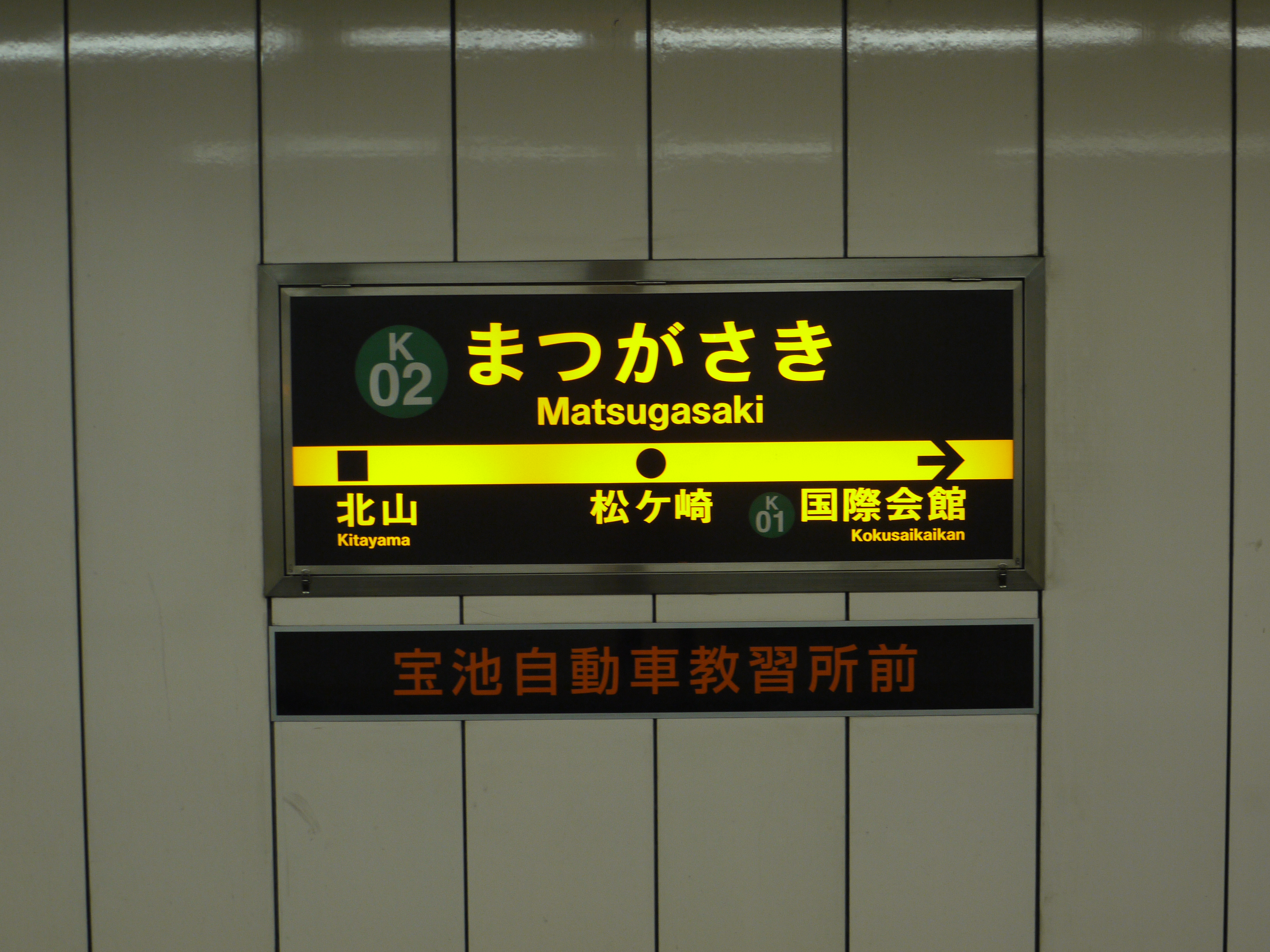
Running in board
Advertisement plate is added underneath the board from April 2010。

=== Tracks ===
P Platforms	Platform 1	Karasuma Line towards Takeda (Kitayama) →
P Platforms	Island platform, doors will open on the left
P Platforms	Platform 2	← Karasuma Line towards Koukusaikaikan (terminus)

Destination of platforms are in accordance with the Kyoto city website

== Around the station ==
The station locates underneath Kitayama dori. Sugakuin Station of Eizan Electric Railway locates 800 m east from Matsugasaki Station. Myō/Hō (妙・法), the characters meaning "wondrous dharma" (referring to Buddhist teachings) of Gozan no Okuribi are held at the north of the station on 16 August every year.。

It is recorded that farmers having paddy ground started living in Matsugasaki in late 8th century and the name of Matsugasaki are found in the Yugiri waley, Evening Mistof The Tale of Genji. Even though the area flourished for over one thousand years, population of the area had remained the same between 9th and 19th centuries because strict local rule existed. The original route of Eizan Electric Railway planned in 1922 was from Kitaoji to Nikendyaya via Matsugasaki, the route was changed before actual construction was commenced. From the end of Taisho era, Matsugasaki area has utilized as residential area and the movement is accelerated the opening of Kitayama dori street in 1985 and construction of subway Karasuma line.。

=== Bus stops ===
Matsugasaki Station bus stop (adjacent to exit 1)

- Kyoto City Bus
  - Route 4: To Kamigamo Shrine / Kyoto Station
  - Route North 8(北8): To Senbon Kitaoji / Kitaoji Bus Terminal
- Kyoto Bus
  - No number: To Takano Depot / Iwakura Muramatsu

Matsugasaki Kaijiri Cho bus stop

- Kyoto City Bus
  - Route 65: To Shijo Karasuma / Iwakura Depot
  - Route North 8(北8): To Senbon Kitaoji / Kitaoji Bus Terminal
- Kyoto Bus
  - Rounte 56: To Demachiyanagi station
  - No number: To Takano Depot / Iwakura Muramatsu

== Bibliography ==
- 田中真人、宇田正、西藤二郎 (1998). 京都 滋賀 鉄道の歴史. 京都新聞社.
- 松ヶ崎を記録する会 (2000). 松ヶ崎. 松ヶ崎立正会.
