= Kitayama Station (Kyoto) =

Metro station in Kyoto, Japan

Coordinates: 35°03′05″N 135°45′59″E

K03 Kitayama Station 北山駅
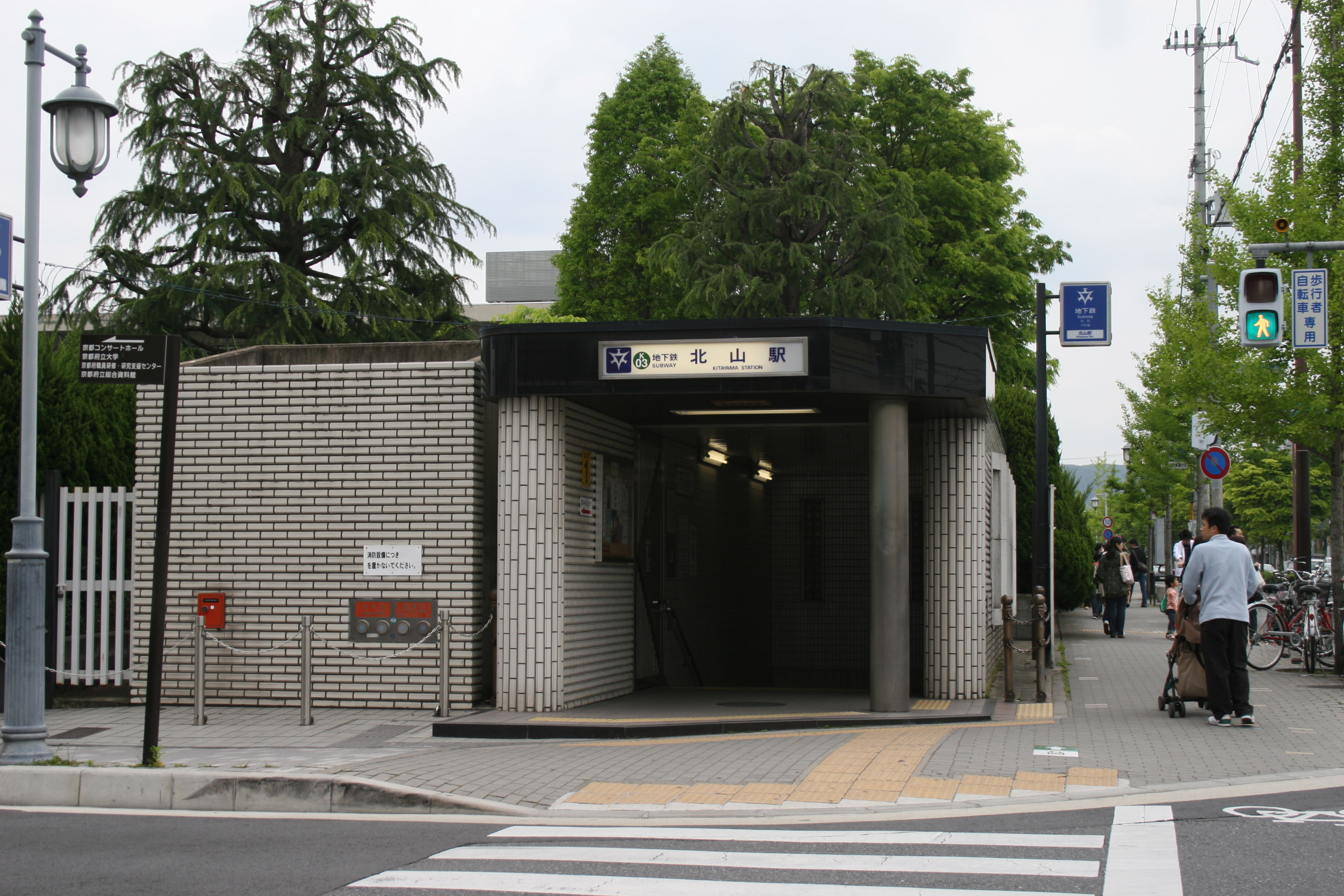
- Entrance of the station

General information
- Location: Kita-ku, Kyoto; Japan
- Operator: Kyoto Municipal Subway
- Line: Karasuma Line
- Platforms: 1 island platform
- Tracks: 2

Other information
- Station code: K03

History
- Opened: October 24, 1990; 35 years ago

Passengers
- FY2016: 14,083 daily

Services
Preceding station	Kyoto Municipal Subway	Following station
Kitaōji K04 towards Takeda	Karasuma Line	Matsugasaki K02 towards Kokusaikaikan
Location

Kitayama Station (北山駅, Kitayama-eki) is a train station on the Kyoto Municipal Subway Karasuma Line in Kita-ku, Kyoto, Japan.

== Lines ==
- Kyoto Municipal Subway
  - Karasuma Line (Station Number: K03)

== History ==
The station opened on October 24, 1990 when the Karasuma Line extension between Kitaōji and Kitayama completed. Until June 3, 1997, the station was the terminus of the line.

== Layout ==
The underground station has one island platform serving two tracks. The tracks are on the second basement and the concourse is on the first basement.
