= Tōji Station =

Railway station in Kyoto, Japan

Tōji Station 東寺駅
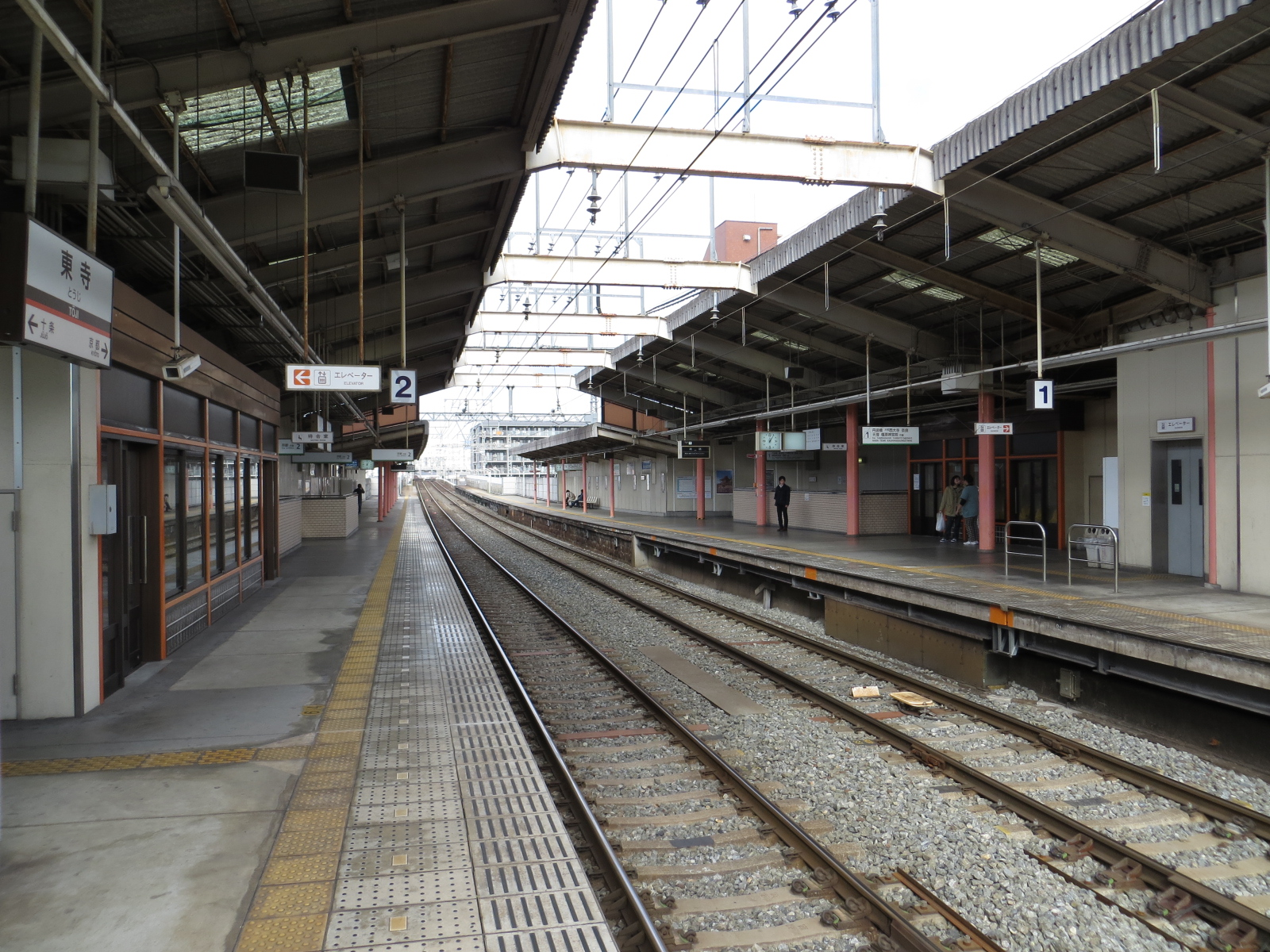
- Platform of Tōji Station on Kintetsu Kyoto Line.

General information
- Location: 39, Nishi-Kujo Zaocho, Minami-ku, Kyoto-shi, Kyoto-fu （京都府京都市南区西九条蔵王町39） Japan
- Coordinates: 34°58′47.59″N 135°45′9.48″E
- System: Kintetsu Railway commuter rail station
- Owner: Kintetsu Railway
- Operator: Kintetsu Railway
- Line: Kyoto/Kashihara Line
- Distance: 0.9 km from Kyoto
- Platforms: 2 side platforms
- Tracks: 2
- Connections: Bus stop

Construction
- Structure type: Elevated

Other information
- Station code: B02
- Website: Official

History
- Opened: 3 November 1928

Passengers
- FY2015: 2.6 million

Services
Preceding station	Kintetsu Railway	Following station
Kyōto Terminus	Kyoto Line Local Semi-Express	Jūjō towards Yamato-Saidaiji
Kyōto Terminus	Kyoto Line Express	Takeda towards Yamato-Saidaiji
Location
- Location within Kyoto Prefecture Location within Japan

Tōji Station (東寺駅, Tōji-eki) is a passenger railway station located in Minami-ku in Kyoto, Japan. It is operated by the private railway operator Kintetsu Railway.It is station number B02.

== Lines ==
Tōji Station is served by the Kyoto Line, and is located 0.9 kilometers from the terminus of the line at Kyoto Station.

== Station layout ==
The station consists two opposed elevated side platforms, with an effective platform length of six cars.The ticket gates and concourse are on the first floor, and there is only one ticket gate. The station is unattended.

=== Platforms ===
1	■ Kintetsu Kyoto Line	for Tambabashi, Shin-Tanabe, Yamato-Saidaiji, Kintetsu Nara, Tenri and Kashiharajingu-mae
2	■ Kintetsu Kyoto Line	for Kyoto

== History ==
The station opened on 15 November 1928 as a station of Nara Electric Railroad. In 1938, the station was moved 100 metres (330 ft) towards Yamato-Saidaiji, and became an elevated station. Nara Electric Railroad merged with Kintetsu in 1963. In 2007, the station started using PiTaPa.

== Passenger statistics ==
In fiscal 2023, the station was used by an average of 7,931 passengers daily (boarding passengers only).

== Surrounding area ==
- Tō-ji, noted Buddhist temple
- NTT West Japan Kyoto Hospital
- Kyoto Municipal Kujo Junior High School
- Kyoto Municipal Kujo Kodo Elementary School
- Kyoto Computer Gakuin

== See also ==
- List of railway stations in Japan
