= Kyoto Municipal Subway =

Rapid transit system in Kyoto, Japan

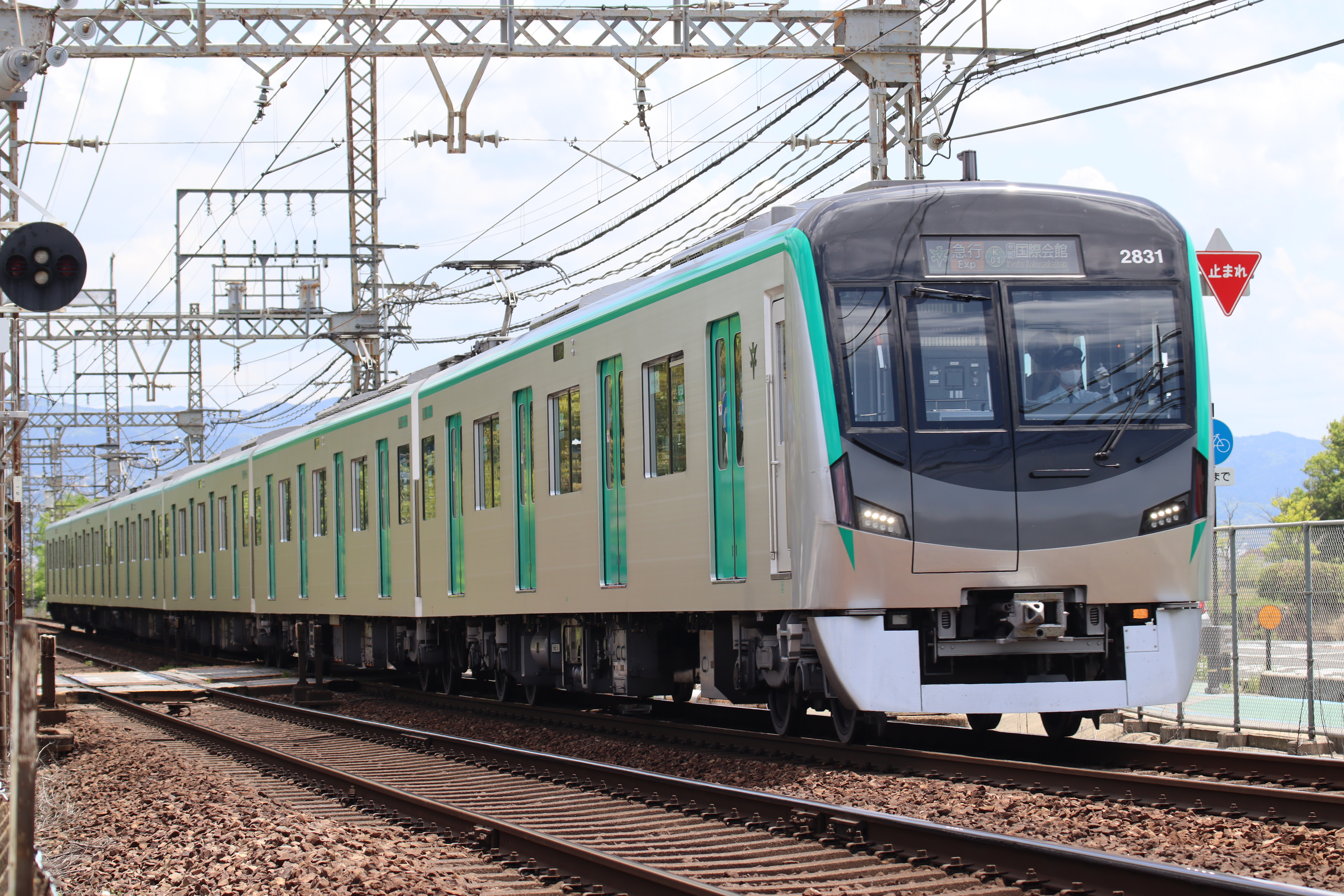
- A 20 series train

Overview
- Native name: 京都市営地下鉄
- Locale: Kyoto, Japan
- Transit type: Rapid transit
- Number of lines: 2
- Number of stations: 31
- Daily ridership: 397,000 (2018)
- Website: Website

Operation
- Began operation: 29 May 1981; 45 years ago
- Operator: Kyoto Municipal Transportation Bureau

Technical
- System length: 31.2 km (19.4 mi)
- Track gauge: 1,435 mm (4 ft 8 1/2 in) standard gauge
- Electrification: 1,500 V DC overhead catenary
- Top speed: 75 km/h (47 mph)
System map
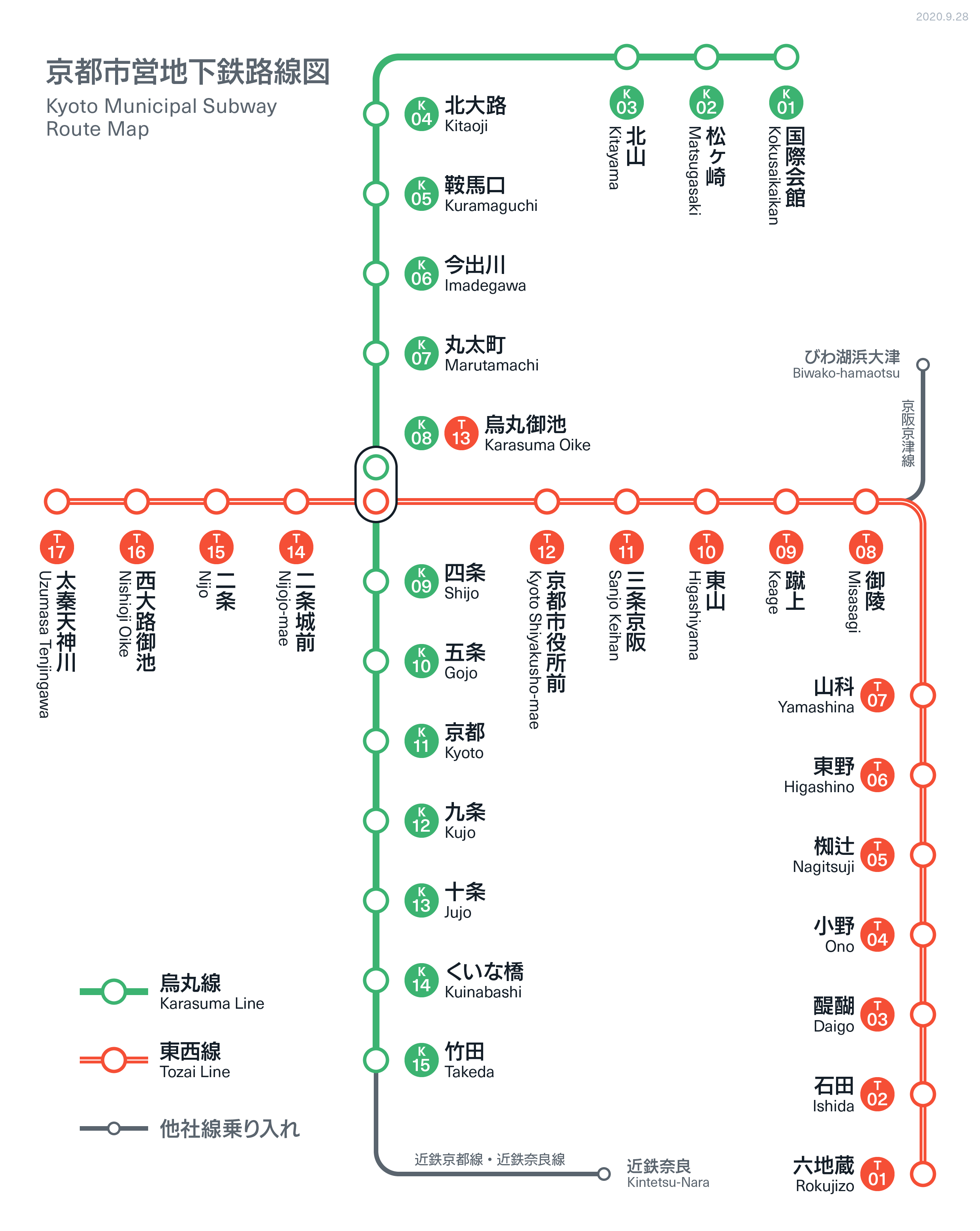

The Kyoto Municipal Subway (京都市営地下鉄, Kyōto-shiei chikatetsu), also known as the Kyoto City Subway, is the rapid transit network in the city of Kyoto, Japan. Operated by the Kyoto Municipal Transportation Bureau, it has two lines.

== History ==
In 1931, the Kyoto City Civil Engineering Bureau proposed a municipal development plan that included the construction of a “high-speed railway” along either the Horikawa Line (堀川線) or the Nishioji Line (西大路線), with a connection to Kyoto Station. At the time, the precise form of this system had not been defined, and possibilities included an underground railway, a monorail, or a surface line built on a dedicated right-of-way.

By 1939, amid growing international tensions during the World War II, the head of Kyoto City’s urban planning department advocated for formal study of a subway system, reportedly noting that air battles would occur, highlighting concerns over the vulnerability of surface transportation. In July of that year, the issue became a subject of debate at the Fourth Subcommittee of the Greater Kyoto Development Council (大京都振興審議会).

In 1965, the Kyoto City Transportation Business Council, chaired by Eiji Yonetani, Professor Emeritus of Kyoto University released a report concluding that, in the long term, Kyoto’s urban transportation system should transition to a framework centered on subways and buses, with the gradual abolition of the streetcar network. Building on this assessment, the Kyoto City Long-Term Development Plan announced in August 1966 identified streetcars as a significant impediment to road traffic flow amid rising motorization.

On October 24, 1972, the Minister of Transport granted Kyoto City a license to operate a local railway, authorizing construction of the Karasuma Line between Kitayama and Takeda. The initial plan envisioned the full opening of the Kitayama–Takeda corridor by March 1978. However, worsening municipal finances and prolonged land acquisition negotiations, particularly in the sections between Kitayama and Kitaōji, and between Kyoto and Takeda necessitated a revision of the construction schedule. As a result, the Kitaōji–Kyoto segment was designated as a priority development area and advanced ahead of the remaining sections.

A groundbreaking ceremony for the project was held on November 29, 1974, marking the formal start of construction. The first operational section of the Karasuma Line, running between Kitaōji Station and Kyoto Station, commenced service on May 29, 1981.

== Lines ==
The Kyoto Municipal Subway is made up of two lines: the 13.7-kilometer (8.5 mi) long, 15-station Karasuma Line, and the 17.5-kilometer (10.9 mi) long, 17-station Tōzai Line, which together share one interchange station (Karasuma Oike Station):

Color & Icon	Mark	Name		First section opened	Last ex- tension	Length	Stations
Green	K	-	Karasuma Line	1981	1997	13.7 km (8.5 mi)	15
Green	-	Via trackage rights	Kintetsu Kyōto Line	1988 (Note: Between Takeda Station and Yamato-Saidaiji Station.)	2000	31.0 km (19.3 mi)	22 (Note: Including Takeda Station.)
Green	-	Via trackage rights	Kintetsu Nara Line	2000 (Note: Between Yamato-Saidaiji Station and Kintetsu Nara Station.)	-	4.4 km (2.7 mi)	3 (Note: Including Yamato-Saidaiji Station.)
Vermilion	T	-	Tōzai Line	1997 (Note: Between Rokujizō Station and Misasagi Station.)	2004	8.7 km (5.4 mi)	8
Vermilion	T	Via trackage rights	Tōzai Line	1997 (Note: Between Misasagi Station and Sanjō Keihan Station; owned by Kyoto High-Speed Rail.)	-	3.4 km (2.1 mi)	3 (Note: Including Keage Station, Higashiyama Station and Sanjō Keihan Station, but not including Misasagi Station.)
Vermilion	T	-	Tōzai Line	1997 (Note: Between Sanjō Keihan Station and Nijō Station.)	-	3.0 km (1.9 mi)	4 (Note: Including Kyoto Shiyakusho-mae Station, Nijōjō-mae Station and Nijō Station, and the Karasuma Oike interchange station (previously counted with the Karasuma Line), but not including Sanjō Keihan Station.)
Vermilion	T	-	Tōzai Line	2008 (Note: Between Nijō Station and Uzumasa Tenjingawa Station.)	-	2.4 km (1.5 mi)	2 (Note: Including Nishiōji Oike Station and Uzumasa Tenjingawa Station.)
Total						31.2 km (19.4 mi)	31

== Rolling stock ==
=== Karasuma Line ===
- Kyoto Municipal Subway 10 series
- Kyoto Municipal Subway 20 series
- Kintetsu 3200 series
- Kintetsu 3220 series
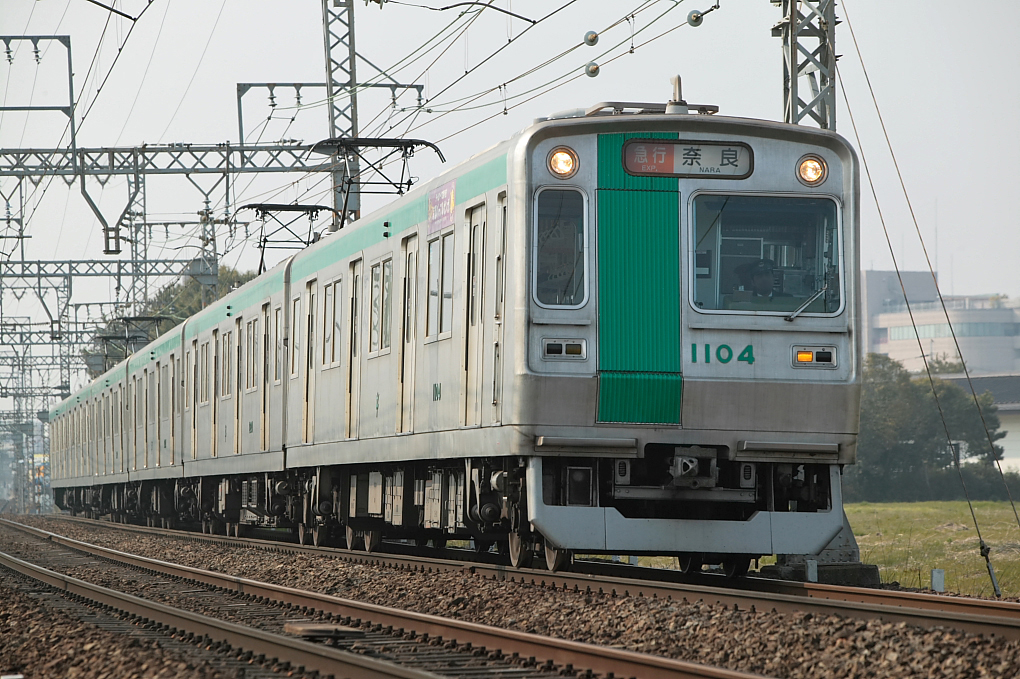
Kyoto Municipal Subway 10 series

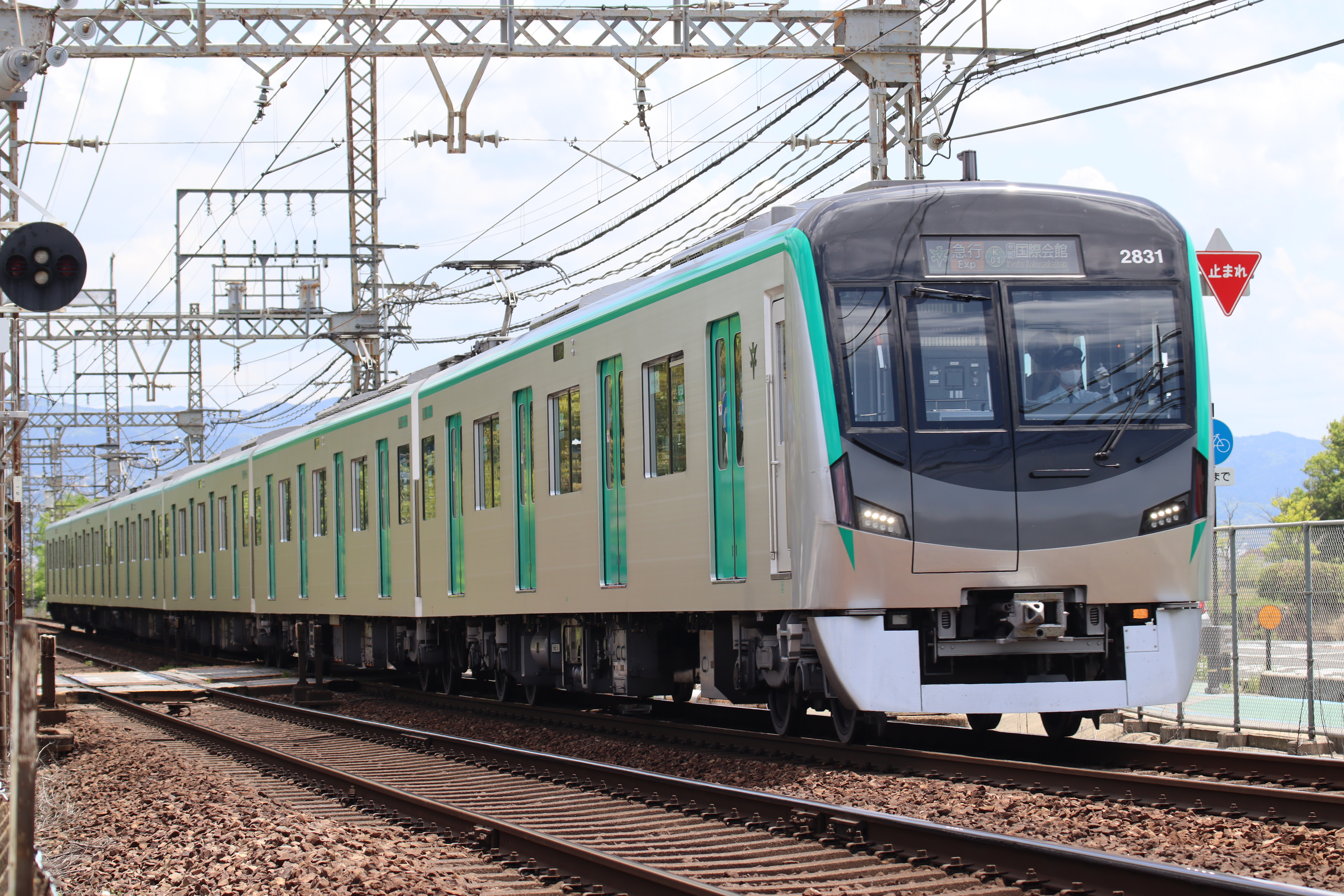
Kyoto Municipal Subway 20 series

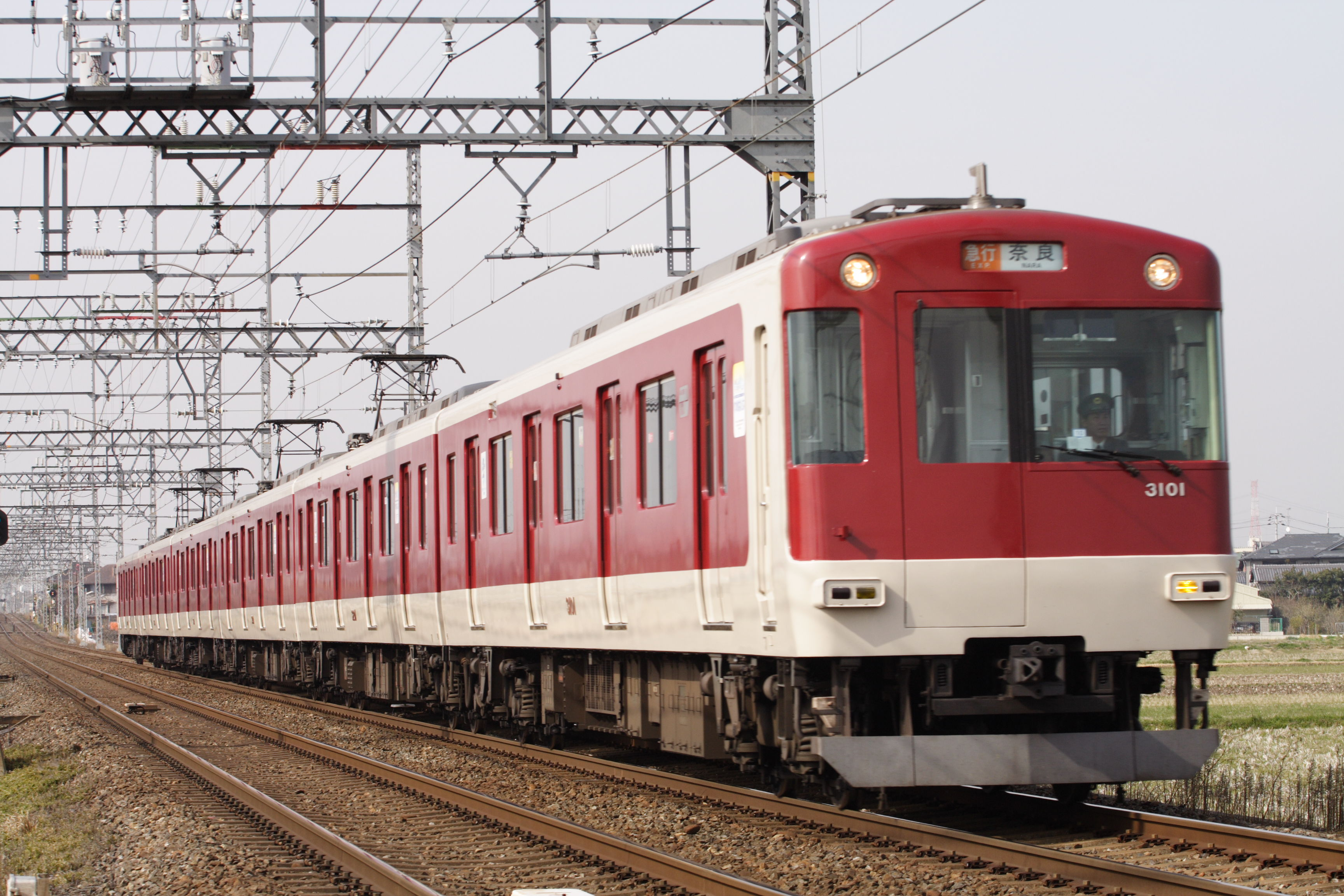
Kintetsu 3200 series

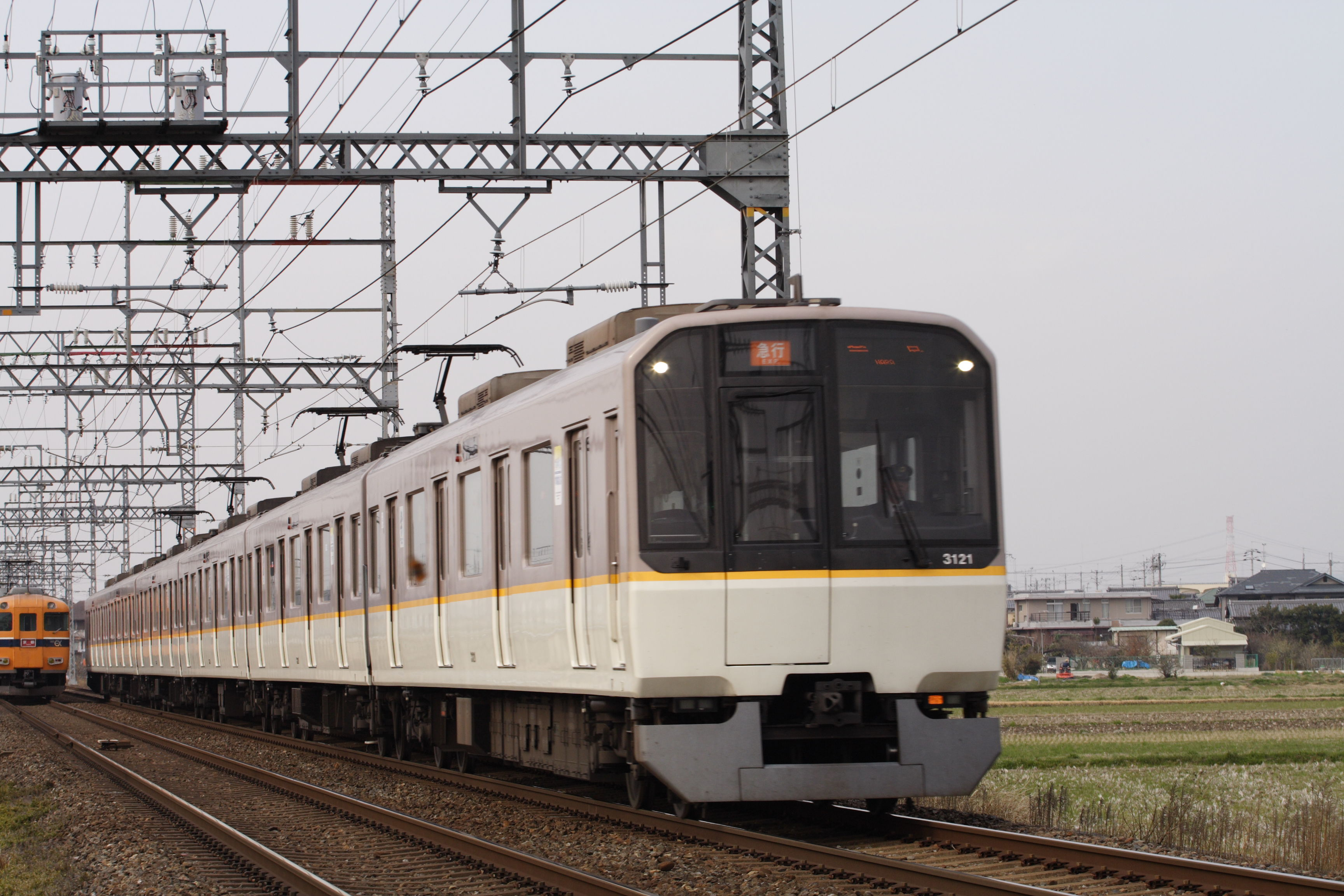
Kintetsu 3220 series

=== Tozai Line ===
- Kyoto Municipal Subway 50 series
- Keihan 800 series
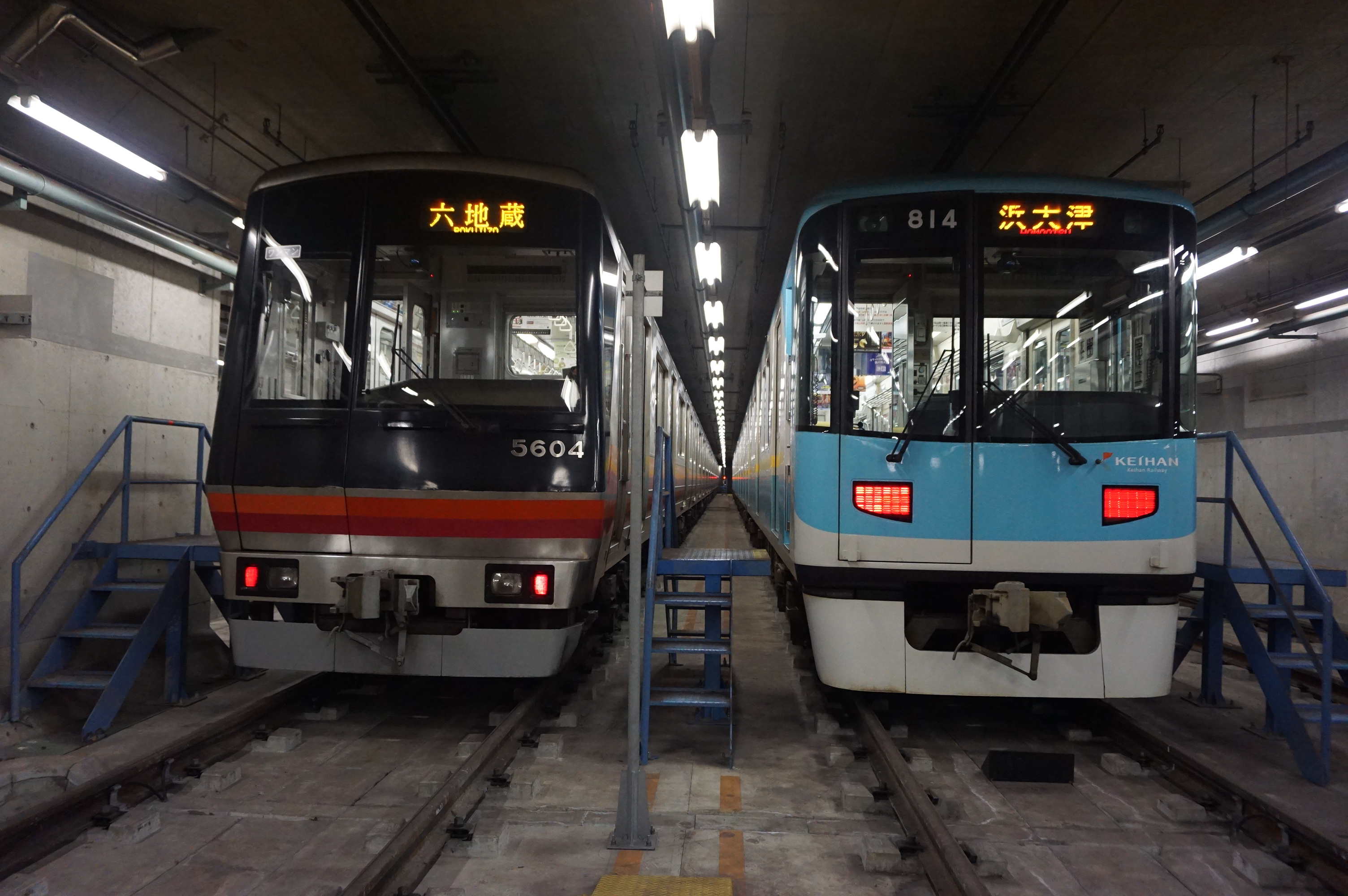
Kyoto Municipal Subway 50 series and Keihan 800 series

== See also ==
- Transport in Keihanshin
- List of metro systems
