= Takeda Station (Kyoto) =

Metro station in Kyoto, Japan

K15 B05 Takeda 竹田駅
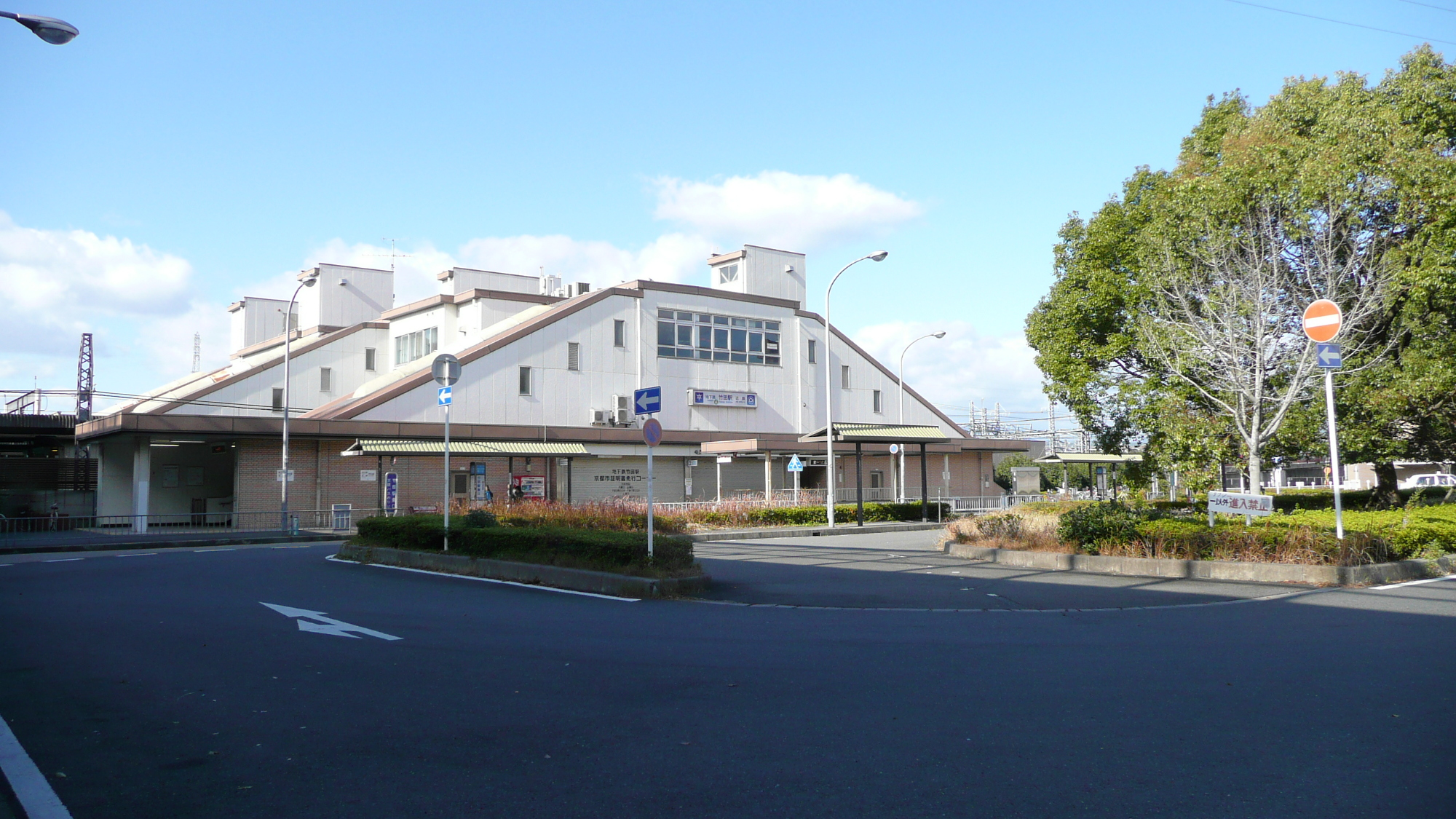
- East side

General information
- Location: Takeda Okenoicho, Fushimi-ku, Kyoto-fu, 612-8421; Japan
- Coordinates: 34°57′24.82″N 135°45′22.01″E
- Owner: Kyoto Municipal Subway
- Operator: Kyoto Municipal Subway; Kintetsu Railway
- Distance: 13.7 km from Kyoto
- Platforms: 2 island platforms
- Tracks: 4
- Connections: Bus stop

Construction
- Structure type: Elevated

Other information
- Station code: B05 (Kintetsu Railway); K15 (Kyoto Municipal Subway)
- Website: Kintetsu

History
- Opened: 15 November 1928
- Former names: Jōnangū-mae (until 1940); Naraden Takeda (to 1963)

Passengers
- 17.8 million (Kintetsu, FY2015); 51,649 daily (Subway, FY2016)

Services
| Preceding station | Kyoto Municipal Subway | Following station |
|---|---|---|
| Terminus | Karasuma Line | Kuinabashi K14 towards Kokusaikaikan |
| Preceding station | Kintetsu Railway | Following station |
| Kamitobaguchi towards Kyōto | Kyoto Line Local | Fushimi towards Yamato-Saidaiji |
| Tōji towards Kyōto | Kyoto Line Semi-Express Express | Kintetsu Tambabashi towards Yamato-Saidaiji |
Location
- Location within Kyoto Prefecture Location within Japan

Takeda station (Japanese: 竹田駅, Hepburn: Takeda-eki) is a passenger railway station located in Fushimi-ku in Kyoto, Japan. It is jointly operated by the private railway operator Kintetsu Railway and the Kyoto Municipal Transportation Bureau, but is under the legal jurisdiction of the Kyoto Municipal Transportation Bureau. It is Kintetsu station number B05 and Kyoto Municipal Subway station number K15.

== Lines ==
Takeda station is served by the Kyoto Line, and is located 13.7 kilometers from the terminus of the line at Kyoto Station. It is also the southern terminal station of the Karasuma Line subway, and is 13.7 kilometers from the northern terminal of the line at Kokusaikaikan. Some Karasuma Line trains operate through service with the Kyoto Line, reaching as far as Kintetsu Nara Station on the Kintetsu Nara Line.

== Station layout ==
The station has two buildings, one on the north side and one on the south side, both of which are elevated stations. The station consists of two island platforms and four tracks, with the inner subway line surrounded by the outer Kintetsu line. The platforms are long enough for eight cars, but because all subway and Kintetsu line trains are a maximum of six cars, two of the cars are separated by a fence. Platforms 2 and 3 are used by trains that operate with the Karasuma Subway Line and the Kintetsu Line, while platforms 1 and 4 are used by trains departing from and arriving at Kintetsu Kyoto Station. Trains traveling in the same direction can transfer between the subway line and the Kintetsu line on the same platform.

Approximately 300 meters south of platforms 2 and 3, just before the crossing, there is a siding for two trains, sandwiched between the Kintetsu tracks. Trains arriving at platform 2 on the Karasuma Line bound for Kokusaikaikan will enter a siding, then turn around and enter platform 3. The siding is reserved for the subway line and does not allow trains to access the Kintetsu Line. In addition, a crossover track branches off from the main line north of platforms 2 and 3 to allow trains to enter and exit the Takeda Subway Depot, located northwest of the station.

This is the only above-ground station on the Kyoto Municipal Subway. The section of the Karasuma Line near this station is the only above-ground section of the entire Kyoto Municipal Subway.

=== Platforms ===
| 1 | ■ Kintetsu Kyoto Line | from Kyoto on the Kintetsu Kyoto Line for Tambabashi, Shin-Tanabe, Yamato-Saidaiji, and Nara |
| 2 | ■ Kintetsu Kyoto Line | from the Karasuma Line for Tambabashi, Shin-Tanabe, Yamato-Saidaiji, and Nara |
| 3 | ■ Karasuma Line | for Kyoto (Subway), Shijō, and Kokusaikaikan |
| 4 | ■ Kintetsu Kyoto Line | for Tōji and Kyoto (Kintetsu) |

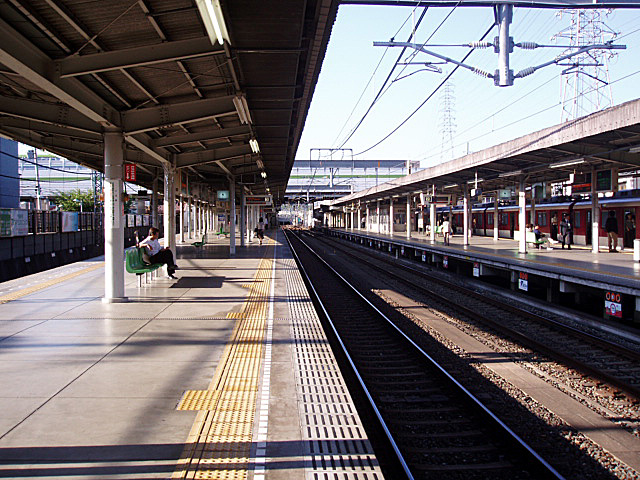
Platforms and tracks

== History ==
The station was opened as by the Nara Electric Railway (奈良電気鉄道, Nara Denki Tetsudō) as Jōnangūmae Station (城南宮前駅) on 15 November 1928, when the railway started the operation between Kyoto and Momoyamagoryō-mae stations. On April 1, 1940, the station was renamed Naraden Takeda Station (奈良電竹田駅). The Nara Electric Railway was merged into the Kintetsu Railway on October 1, 1963, and the station was renamed to its present name.

On June 11, 1988, when the extension of the Karasuma Line subway was completed the station was moved to its current site where is about 350 meters north of the original location and was expanded to serve both Kintetsu and subway lines. At this time the station was handed from Kintetsu to the Kyoto Municipal Transportation Bureau.

== Passenger statistics ==
In fiscal 2023, the Kintetsu station was used by an average of 10,902 passengers daily (boarding passengers only) and the subway portion of the station was used by 18,708 passengers during the same period.

== Surrounding area ==
- Jonan-gu Shrine
- Anrakuju-in Temple
- Nozomi Takeda Campus
- Kyoto Prefectural General Exhibition Center (Pulse Plaza)
- Kyoto City Youth Science Center
- Kyoto Municipal Takeda Elementary School
- Kyoto City Transportation Bureau Takeda Depot
- Kyocera Headquarters

== See also ==
- List of railway stations in Japan
