= Kyoto =

City in the Kansai region of Japan

Kyoto 京都市
- Prefectural capital and Designated city
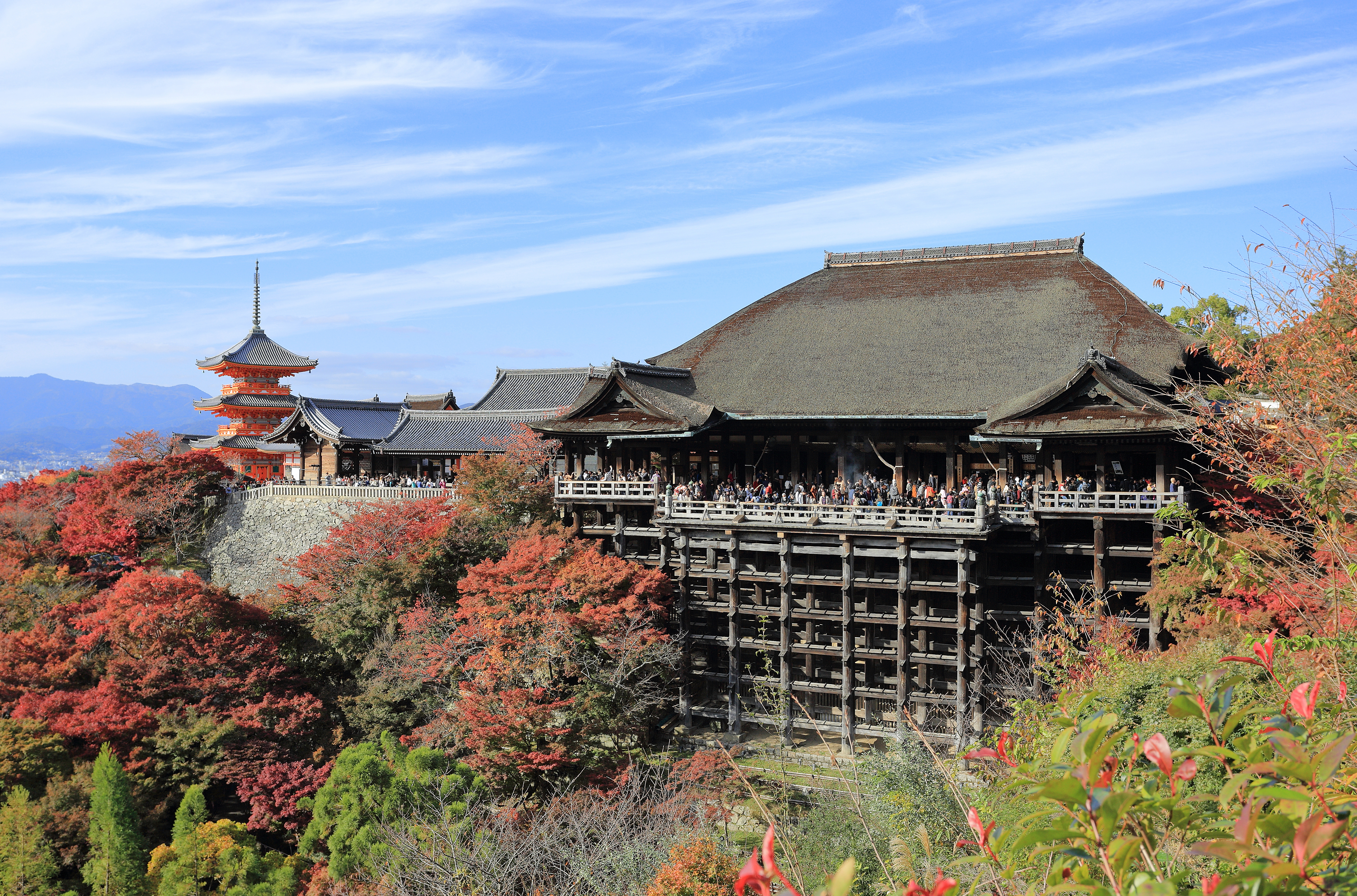
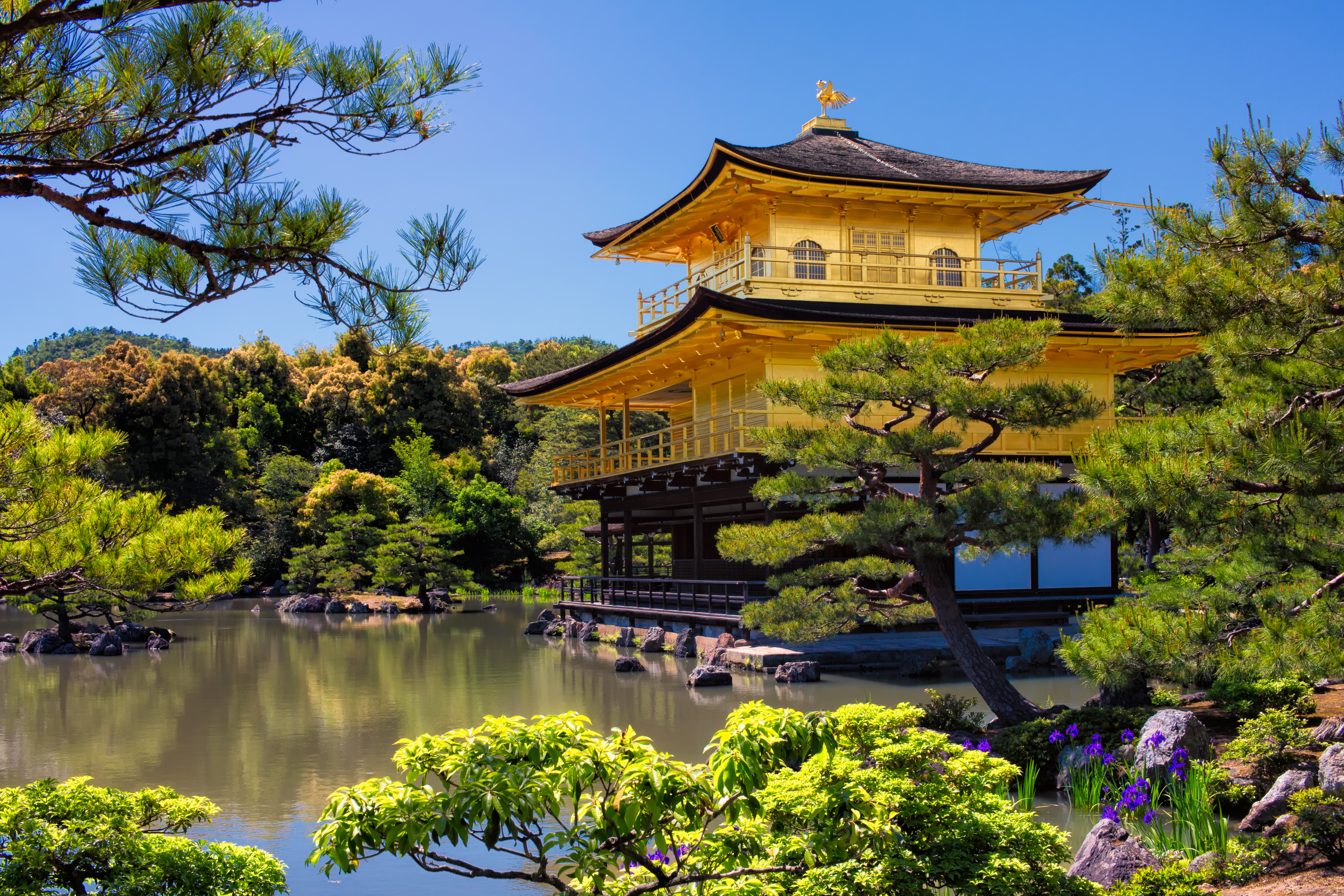
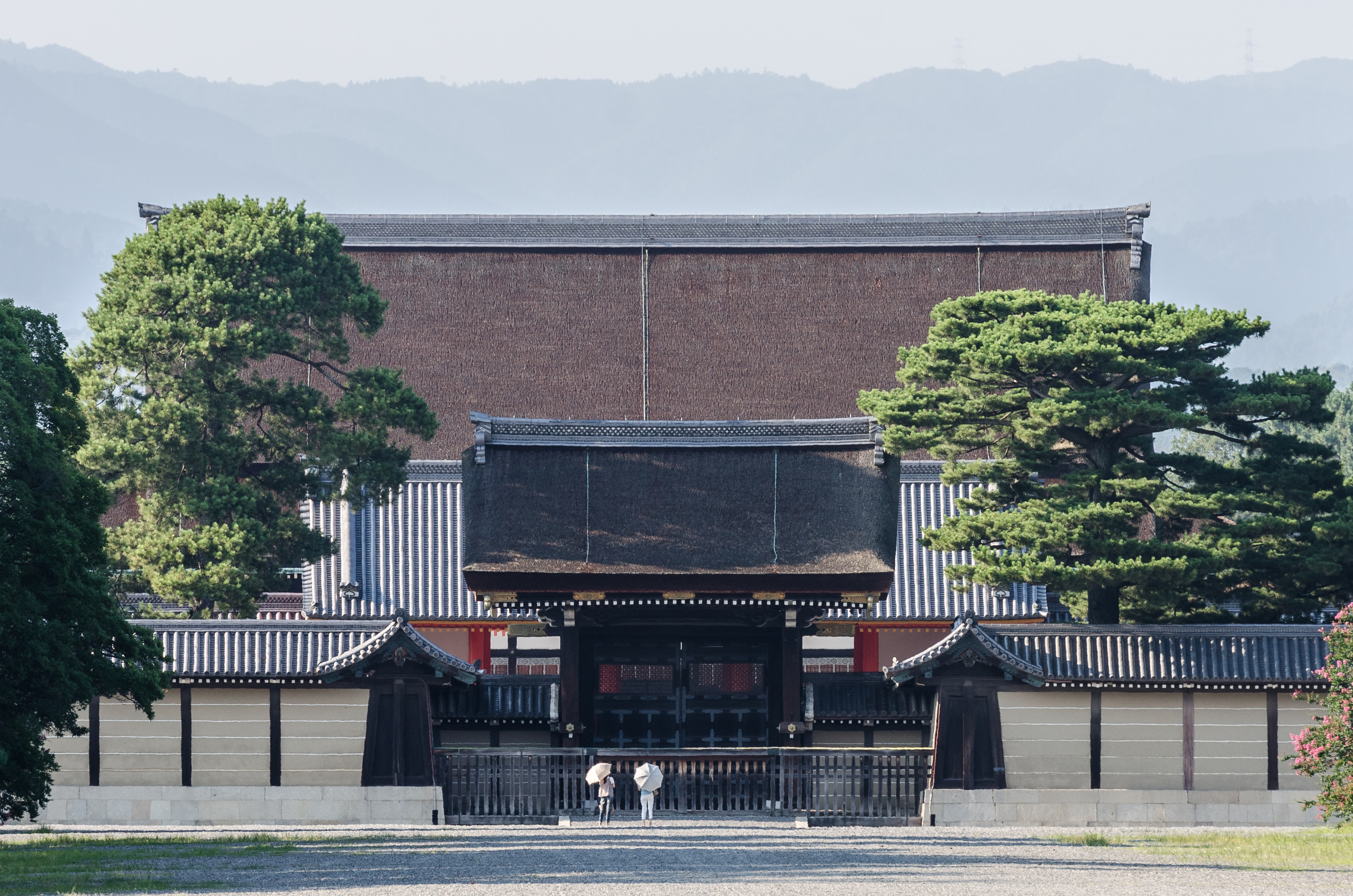
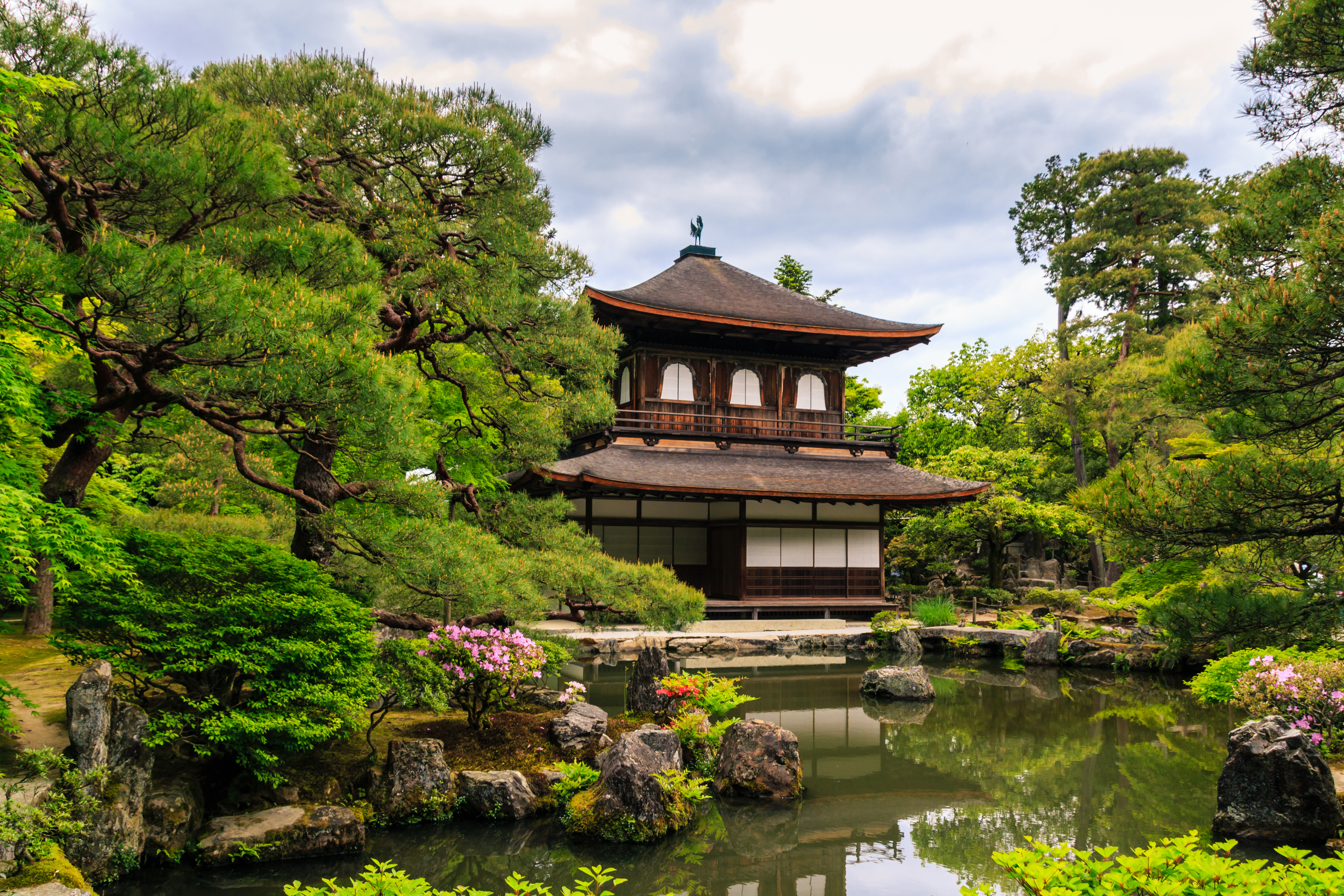
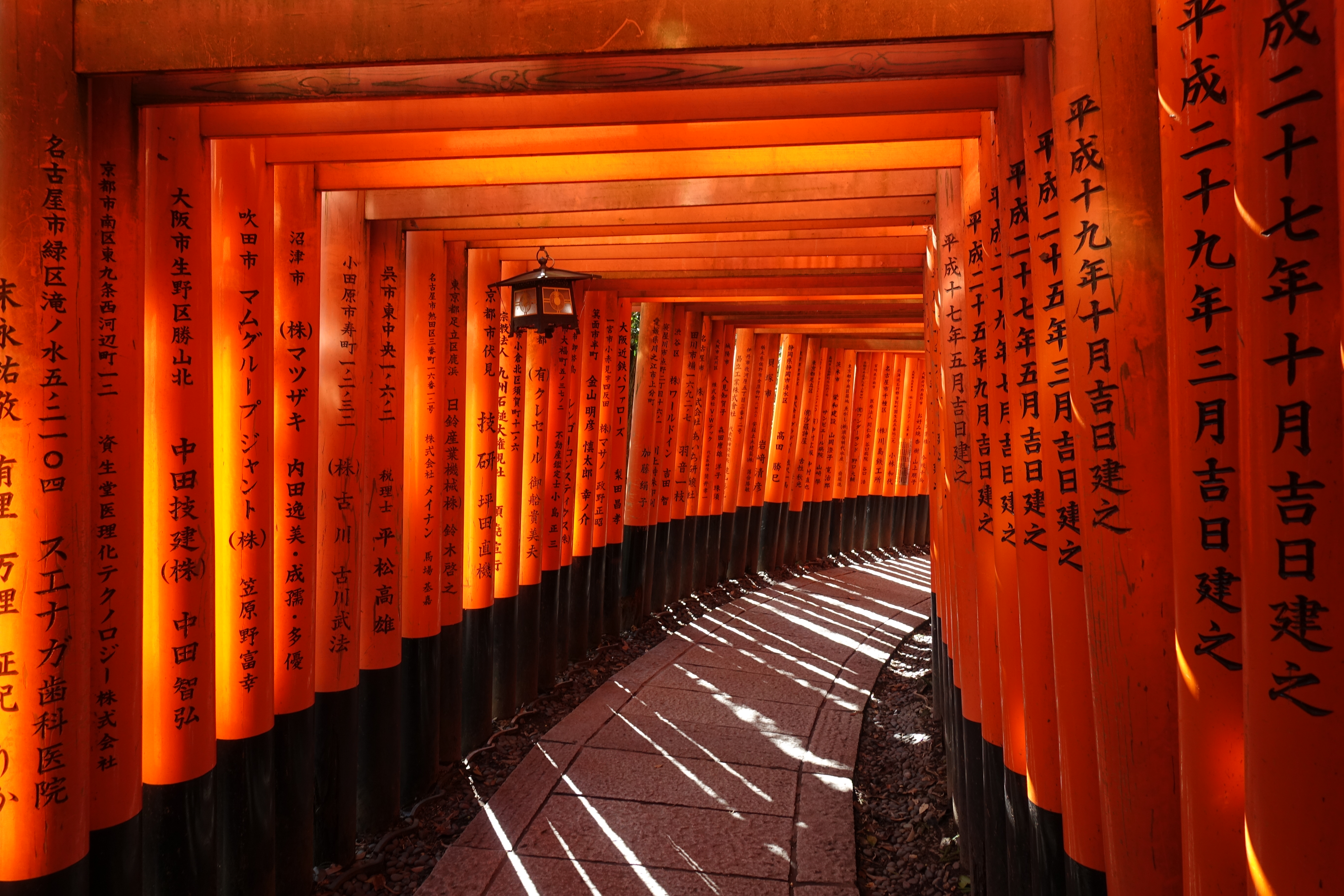
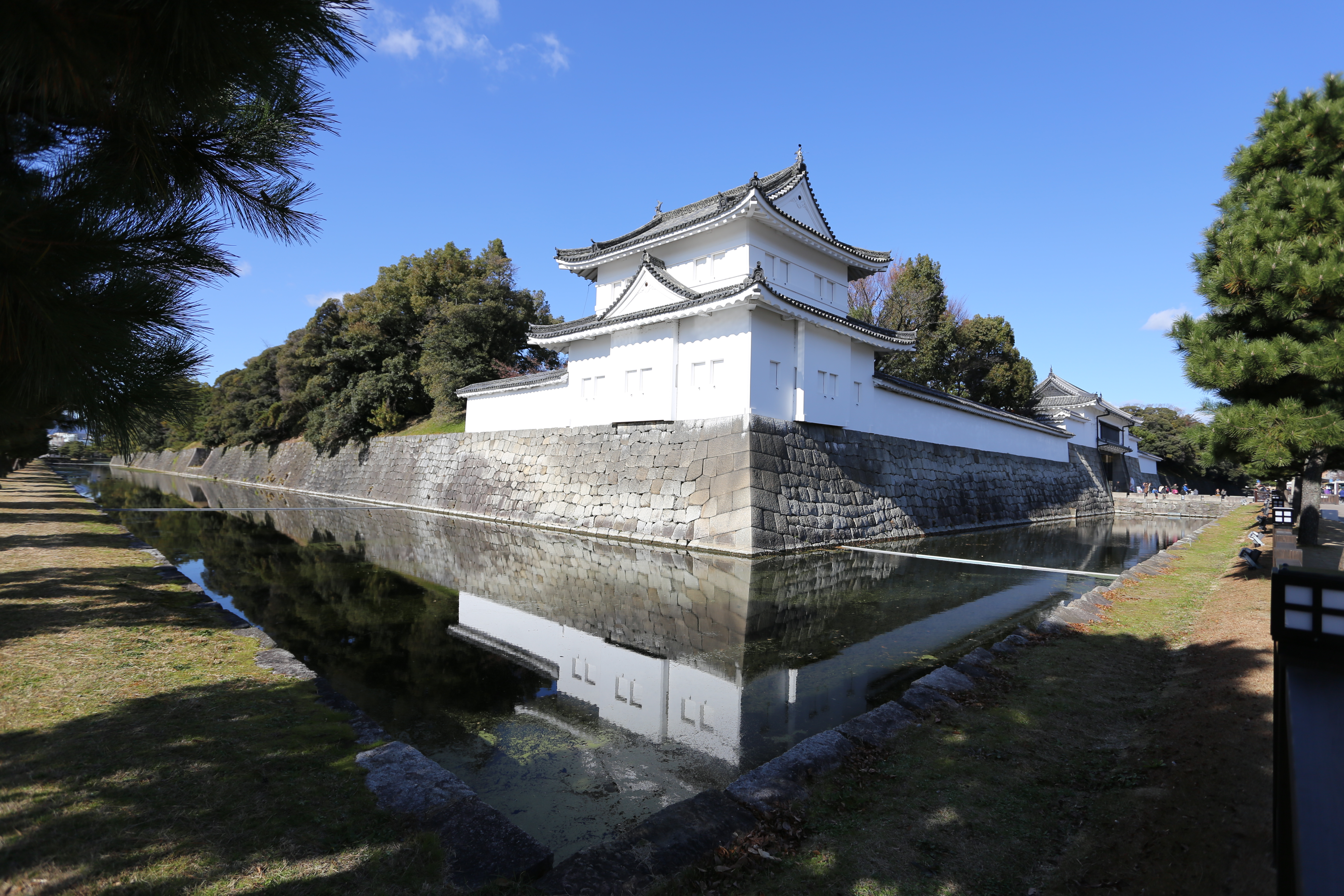
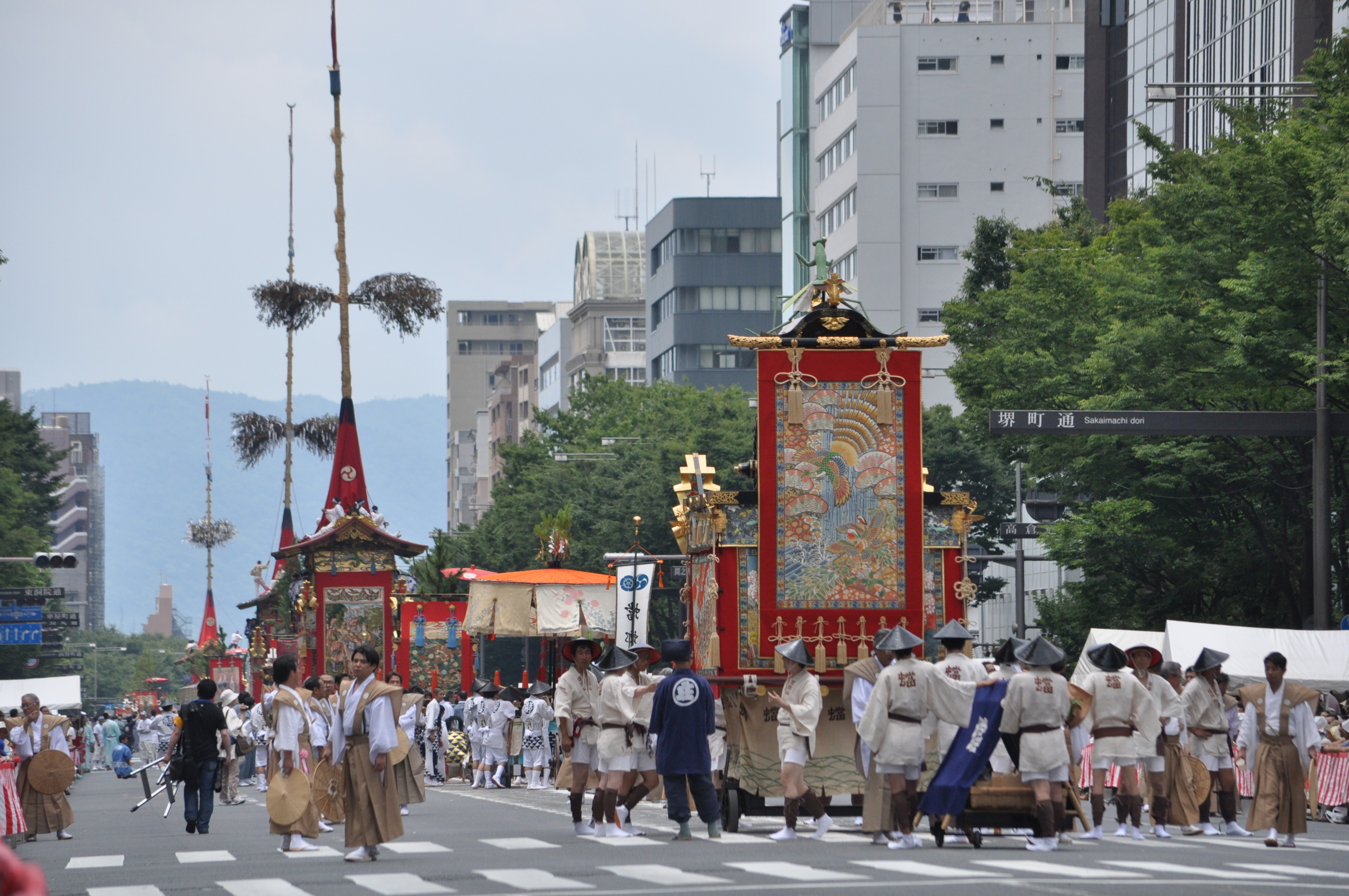
- Kiyomizu-dera Kyoto Station Kinkaku-ji Kyoto Imperial Palace Ginkaku-ji Tō-ji Fushimi Inari-taisha Nijō Castle Ponto-chō Gion Matsuri

- Flag Emblem
- Interactive map outlining Kyoto
- Location of Kyoto in Kyoto Prefecture

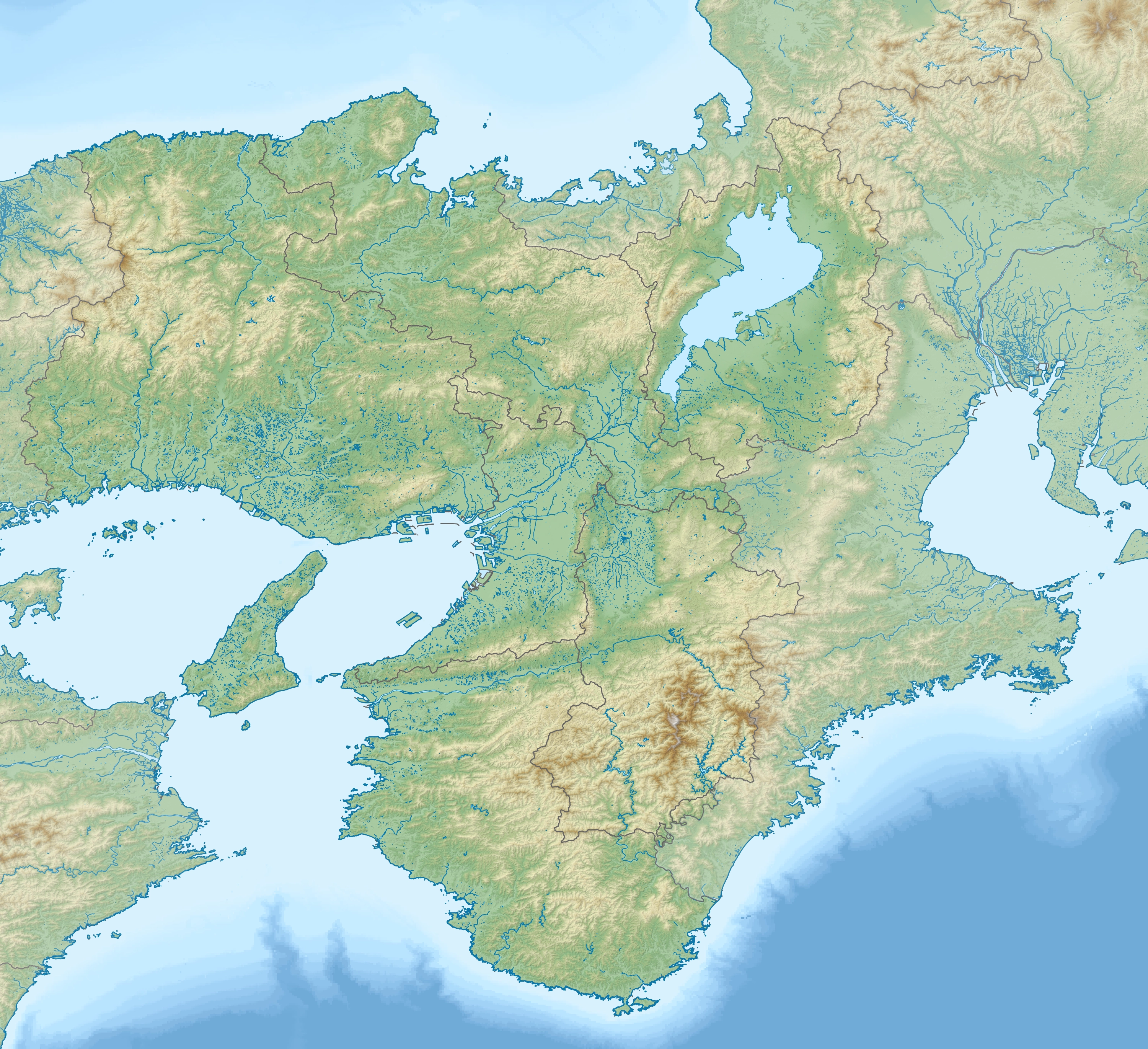
- Location within Japan Location within Kansai Region Location within Kyoto Prefecture Kyoto City
- Coordinates: 35°00′42″N 135°46′05″E
- Country: Japan
- Region: Kansai
- Prefecture: Kyoto Prefecture
- Island: Honshu
- Founded: 794

Government
  - Type: Mayor–council
  - Body: Kyoto City Assembly
  - Mayor: Kōji Matsui

Area
  - Total: 827.83 km^{2} (319.63 sq mi)
- Highest elevation (Note: The highest point in Kyoto City is Mt. Minago.): 971 m (3,186 ft)
- Lowest elevation: 9 m (30 ft)

Population (January 1, 2026)
  - Total: 1,431,419
  - Rank: 9th in Japan
  - Density: 1,729.1/km^{2} (4,478.4/sq mi)
  - Metro: 3,783,014

GDP (nominal, 2022)
  - Total: ¥6.77 trillion (US$42.76 billion)
- Time zone: UTC+09:00 (Japan Standard Time)
- Climate: Humid subtropical climate (Cfa)
- Flower: Camellia, Azalea and Cherry blossom
- Tree: Weeping Willow, Japanese Maple and Katsura
- Website: city.kyoto.lg.jp

Kyoto
- "Kyoto" in kanji

Japanese name
- Kanji: 京都
Transcriptions
- Revised Hepburn: Kyōto
- Kunrei-shiki: Kyouto

Kyoto (/ki.ˈoʊ.toʊ/ or /ˈkjoʊ.toʊ/; Japanese: 京都, Kyōto [k̟ʲjó̞ò̞.tò̞]), officially Kyoto City (京都市, Kyōto-shi; [k̟ʲjò̞ó̞.tó̞.ɕì, k̟ʲjó̞ó̞-], locally [k̟ʲjó̞ó̞.tó̞.ɕì]), is the capital city of Kyoto Prefecture in the Kansai region of Japan's largest and most populous island of Honshu. As of 2020, the city had a population of 1.46 million, making it the ninth-most populous city in Japan. More than half (56.8%) of Kyoto Prefecture's population resides in the city. The city is the cultural anchor of the substantially larger Greater Kyoto, a metropolitan statistical area home to approximately 3.8 million people. It is also part of the even larger Keihanshin metropolitan area, along with Osaka and Kobe.

Kyoto is one of the oldest municipalities in Japan, having been chosen in 794 as the new seat of Japan's imperial court by Emperor Kanmu. The original city, named Heian-kyō, was arranged in accordance with traditional Chinese feng shui following the model of the ancient Chinese capital of Chang'an. The emperors of Japan ruled from Kyoto in the following eleven centuries until 1869. It was the scene of several key events of the Muromachi period, Sengoku period, and the Boshin War, such as the Ōnin War, the Honnō-ji Incident, the Kinmon incident, and the Battle of Toba–Fushimi. The capital was relocated from Kyoto to Tokyo after the Meiji Restoration. The modern municipality of Kyoto was established in 1889. The city was spared from large-scale destruction during World War II and, as a result, its prewar cultural heritage has mostly been preserved.

Kyoto is considered the cultural capital of Japan and is a major tourist destination. The Agency for Cultural Affairs of the national government is headquartered in the city. It is home to numerous Buddhist temples, Shinto shrines, palaces and gardens, some of which have been designated collectively as a World Heritage Site by UNESCO. Prominent landmarks include the Kyoto Imperial Palace, Kiyomizu-dera, Kinkaku-ji, Ginkaku-ji, and Kyoto Tower. The internationally renowned video game company Nintendo is based in Kyoto. Kyoto is also a center of higher learning in the country, and its institutions include Kyoto University, the second-oldest university in Japan.

== Etymology ==
In Japanese, Kyoto was previously called Kyō (京), Miyako (都), Kyō no Miyako (京の都), and Keishi (京師). After becoming the capital of Japan at the start of the Heian period (794–1185), the city was often referred to as Heian-kyō (平安京, "Heian capital"), and late in the Heian period the city came to be widely referred to simply as "Kyōto" (京都, "capital city"). After the seat of the emperor was moved to the city of Edo and that city was renamed "Tōkyō" (東京, meaning "eastern capital"), Kyoto was briefly known as "Saikyō" (西京, meaning "western capital"). As the capital of Japan from 794 to 1868, Kyoto is sometimes called the thousand-year capital (千年の都).

Historically, foreign spellings for the city's name have included Kioto and Miaco, Meaco, or Miako.

== History ==
=== Origins ===
Ample archeological evidence suggests human settlement in the area of Kyoto began as early as the Paleolithic period, although not much published material is retained about human activity in the region before the 6th century, around which time the Shimogamo Shrine is believed to have been established. Before Kyoto became the imperial capital, immigrants from mainland Asia contributed to the development of the area.

During the 8th century, when powerful Buddhist clergy became involved in the affairs of the imperial government, Emperor Kanmu chose to relocate the capital in order to distance it from the clerical establishment in Nara. His last choice for the site was the village of Uda, in the Kadono district of Yamashiro Province.

The new city, Heian-kyō (平安京; "tranquility and peace capital"), modeled after Chinese Tang dynasty capital Chang'an, became the seat of Japan's imperial court in 794, beginning the Heian period of Japanese history. Although military rulers established their governments either in Kyoto (Muromachi shogunate) or in other cities such as Kamakura (Kamakura shogunate) and Edo (Tokugawa shogunate), Kyoto remained Japan's capital until the transfer of the imperial court to Tokyo in 1869 at the time of the Imperial Restoration.

=== Feudal period ===
In the Sengoku period, the city suffered extensive destruction in the Ōnin War of 1467–1477, and did not really recover until the mid-16th century. During the war, battles between samurai factions spilled into the streets, and came to involve court nobility (kuge) and religious factions as well. Nobles' mansions were transformed into fortresses, deep trenches dug throughout the city for defense and as firebreaks, and numerous buildings burned. The city has not seen such widespread destruction since.

In the late 16th century, Toyotomi Hideyoshi reconstructed the city by building new streets to double the number of north–south streets in central Kyoto, creating rectangle blocks superseding ancient square blocks. Toyotomi also built earthwork walls called odoi (御土居) encircling the city. Teramachi Street in central Kyoto is a Buddhist temple quarter where Toyotomi gathered temples in the city.

Gallery

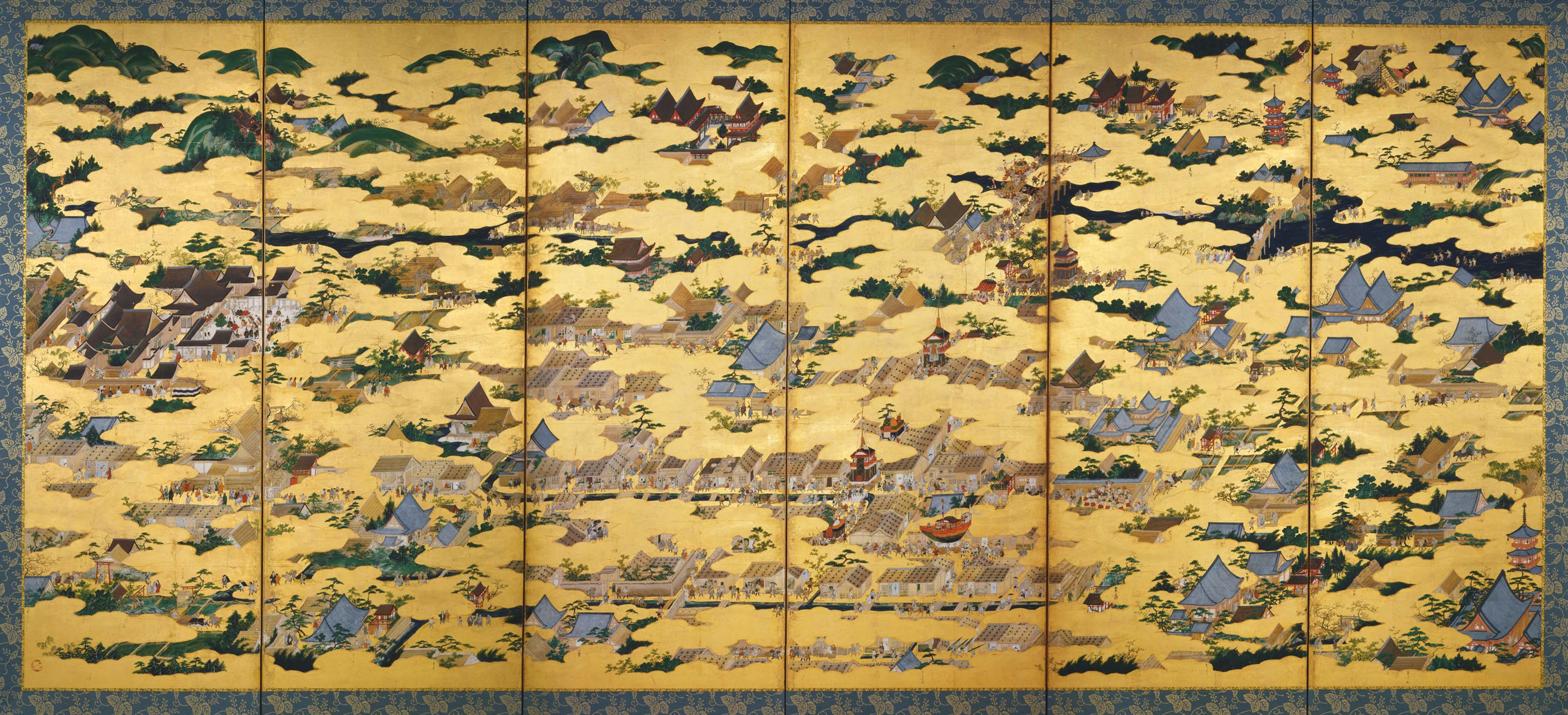
Rakuchū rakugai zu, a 16th-century depiction of central Kyoto including Gion Matsuri floats (center) and Kiyomizu-dera (upper right)

=== Early modern period ===
In 1603, the Tokugawa Shogunate was established at Edo (present-day Tokyo), marking the beginning of the Edo period. Nevertheless, Kyoto flourished as one of three major cities in Japan, the others being Osaka and Edo. At the end of the period, the Hamaguri rebellion of 1864 burned down 28,000 houses in the city, which showed the rebels' dissatisfaction towards the Tokugawa Shogunate.

Gallery

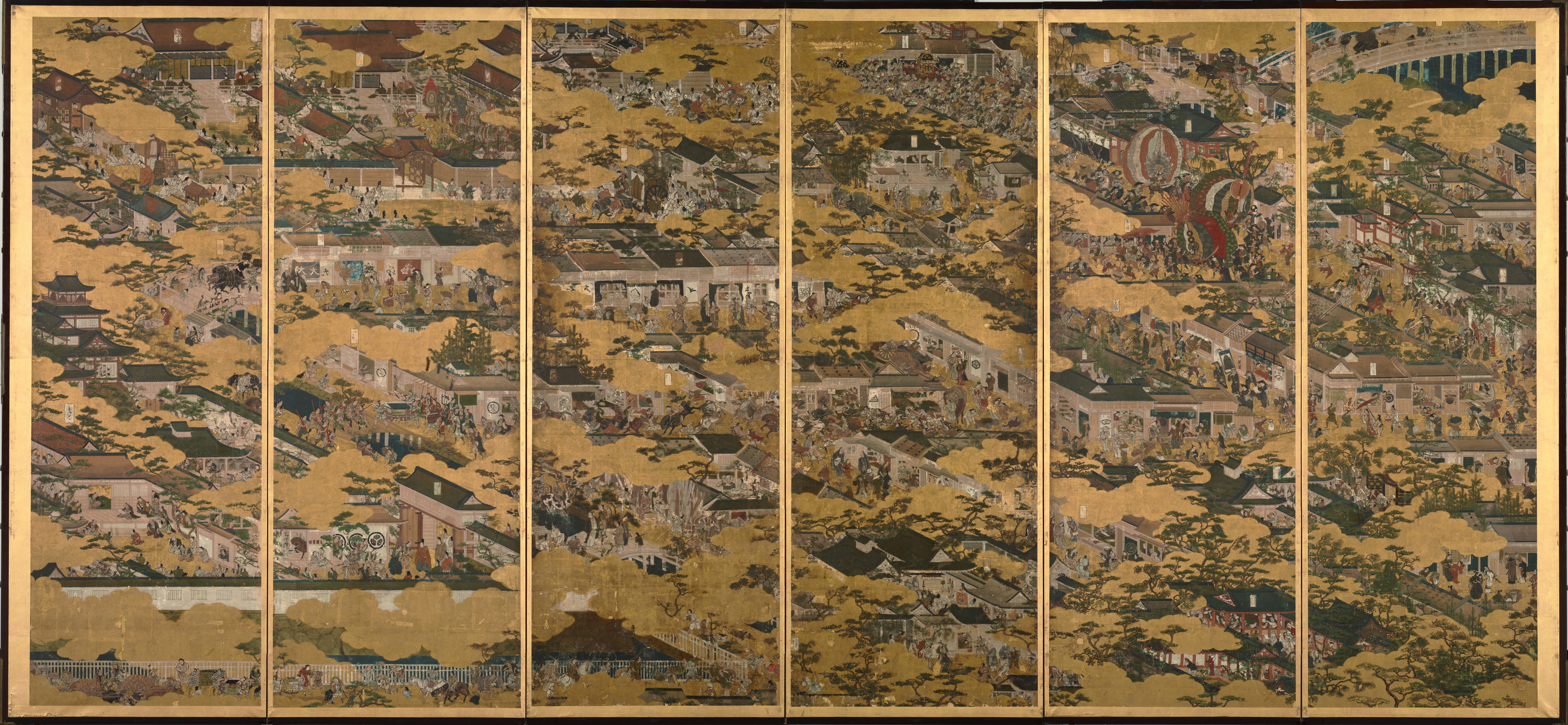
Scenes in and around Kyoto (c. 1615)

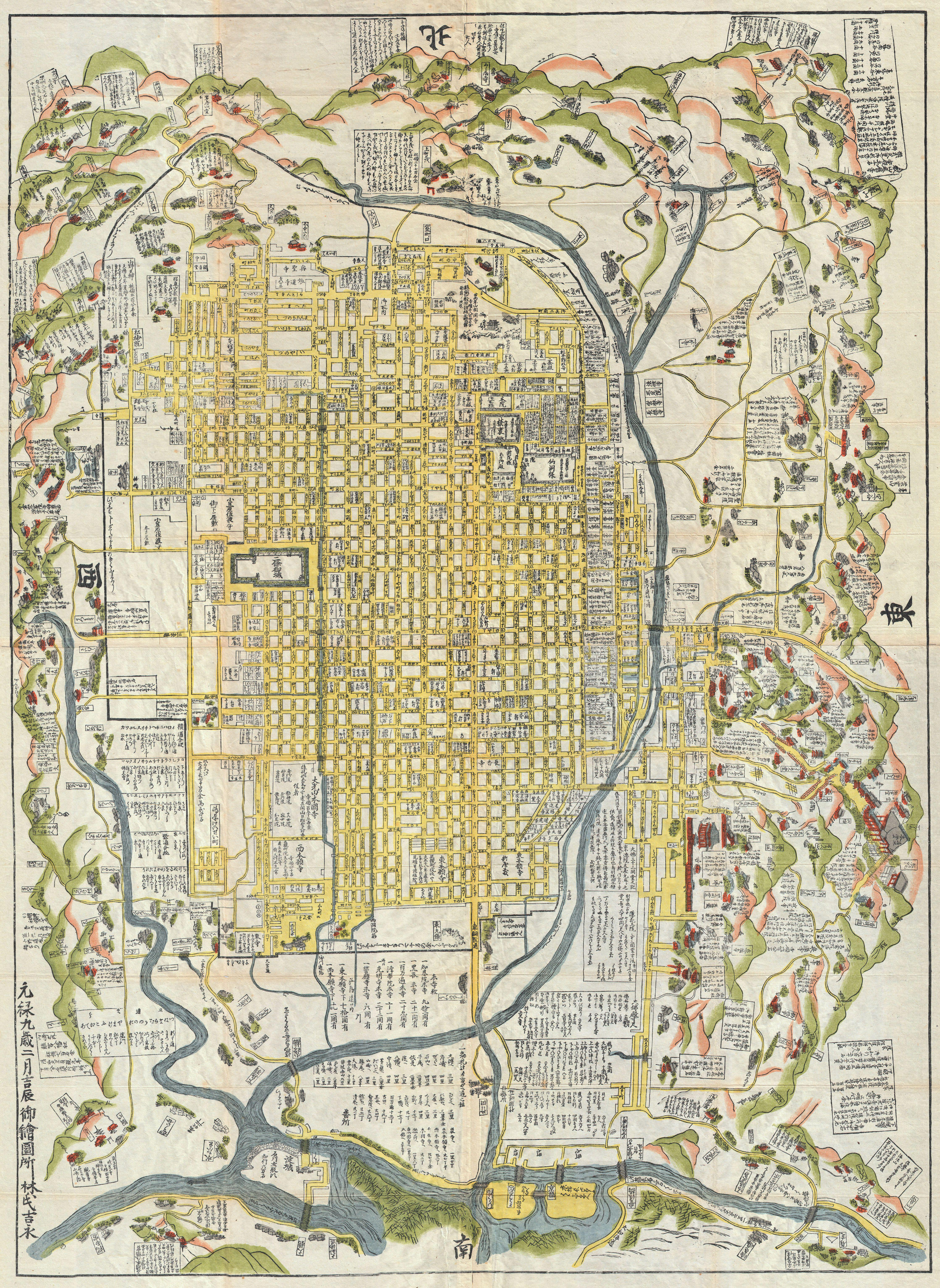
Map of Heian-kyō, 1696

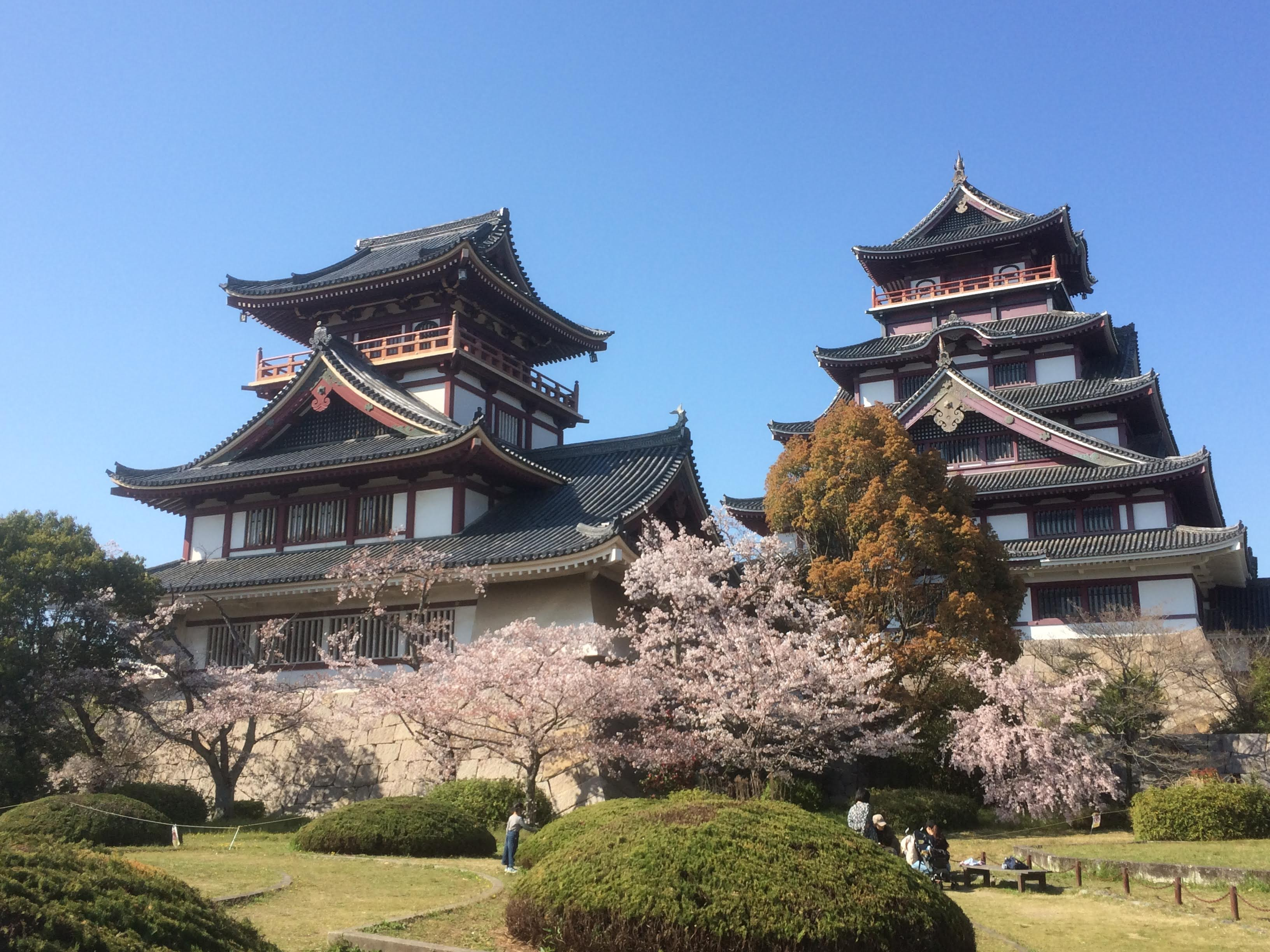
Fushimi Castle

=== Modern period ===
At the start of the Meiji period, the emperor's move from Kyoto to Tokyo in 1869 threatened Kyoto's economic and administrative standing, prompting the city government and local interests to undertake a coordinated plan to strengthen its industrial base and modernize.

==== Key industrial developments ====
- Lake Biwa Canal: Construction of the Lake Biwa Canal began in 1885 and was completed on 9 April 1890. The 20 km waterway linked Lake Biwa to Kyoto, supplying drinking water, irrigation, and, from 1895, hydroelectric power for factories and street lighting. It also enabled Japan's first electric tram line in Kyoto.
- Rail, Road and Feeder Canals: Branch rail lines connected Kyoto to the Tōkaidō Main Line, while expanded roadways and secondary canals improved the flow of goods and raw materials. In 1895, Kyoto introduced the country's first commercial electric railway, powered by Lake Biwa Canal hydroelectricity.
- Municipal Annexations: To secure land for factories, worker housing and public amenities, Kyoto expanded its boundaries in two stages. In 1918 and again in 1931, the city absorbed the neighboring towns of Fushimi, Kii, Kadono and Otagi, extending its jurisdiction beyond the medieval inner wards (rakuchū) into the outer suburbs (rakugai).

==== Adoption of western architectural style ====
Public buildings from the late Meiji era incorporated European and American design elements as symbols of modernity:

- Ryukoku University Main Hall: A brick-and-timber structure was closely influenced by British collegiate architecture and completed in 1879.
- Kyoto National Museum: It was completed in 1895 and was built in a French Second Empire style. At the time, this sparked criticism from local observers who saw the design as culturally discordant, particularly given Kyoto's historical role as the imperial capital.
Gallery

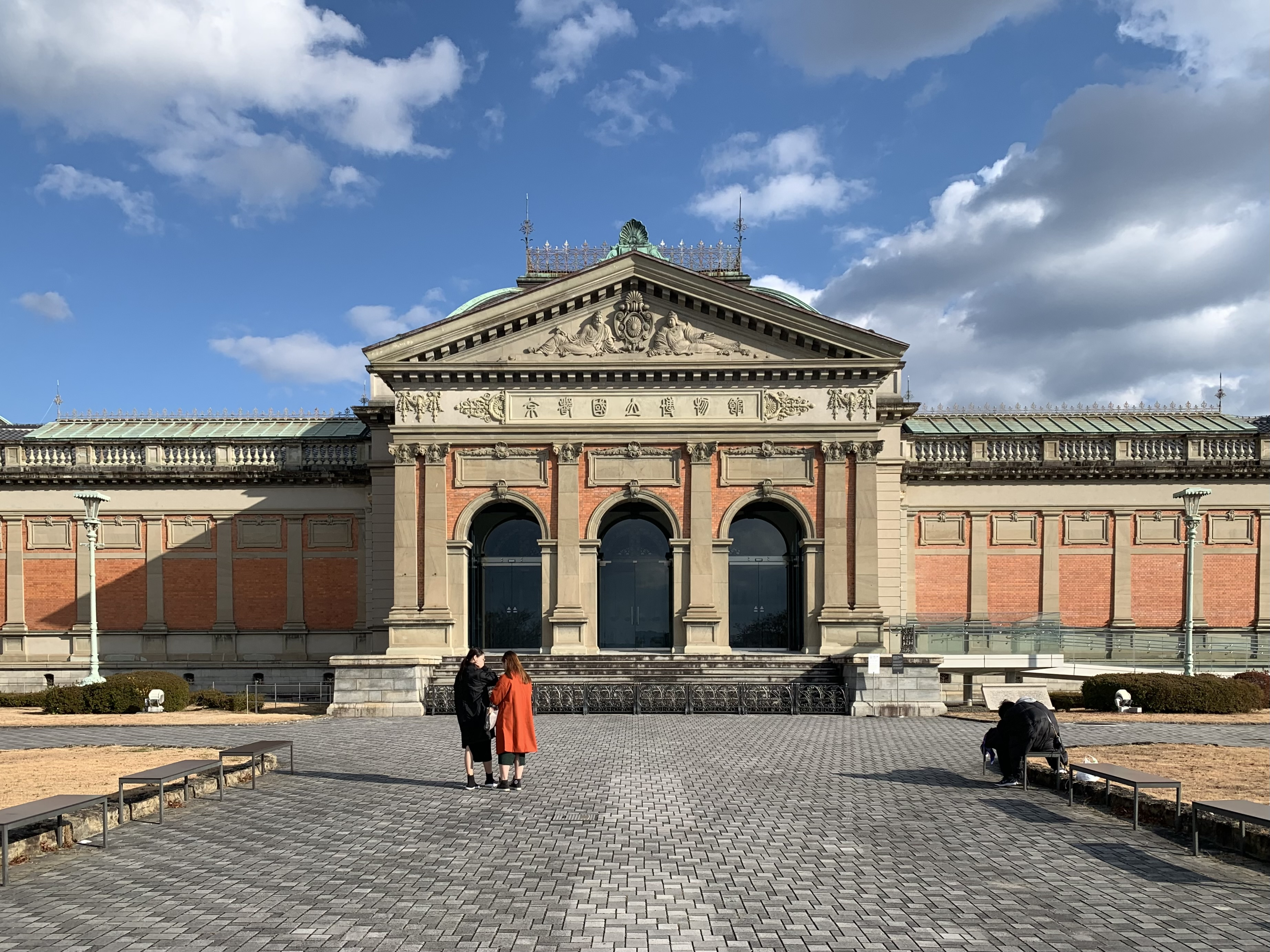
Kyoto National Museum

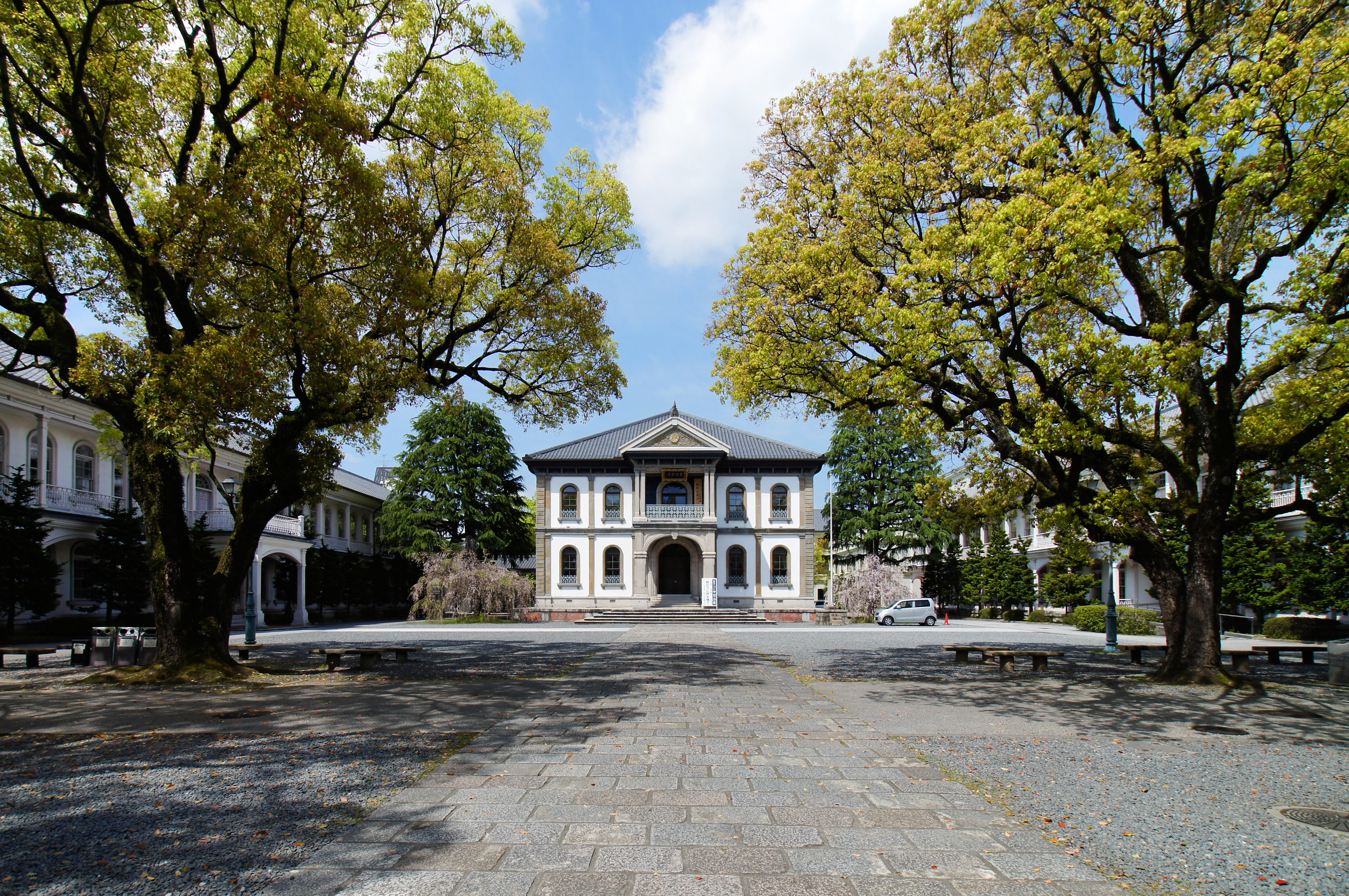
Ryukoku University

The modern city of Kyoto was officially formed on April 1, 1889, and by 1932, the population of the city exceeded one million.

Gallery

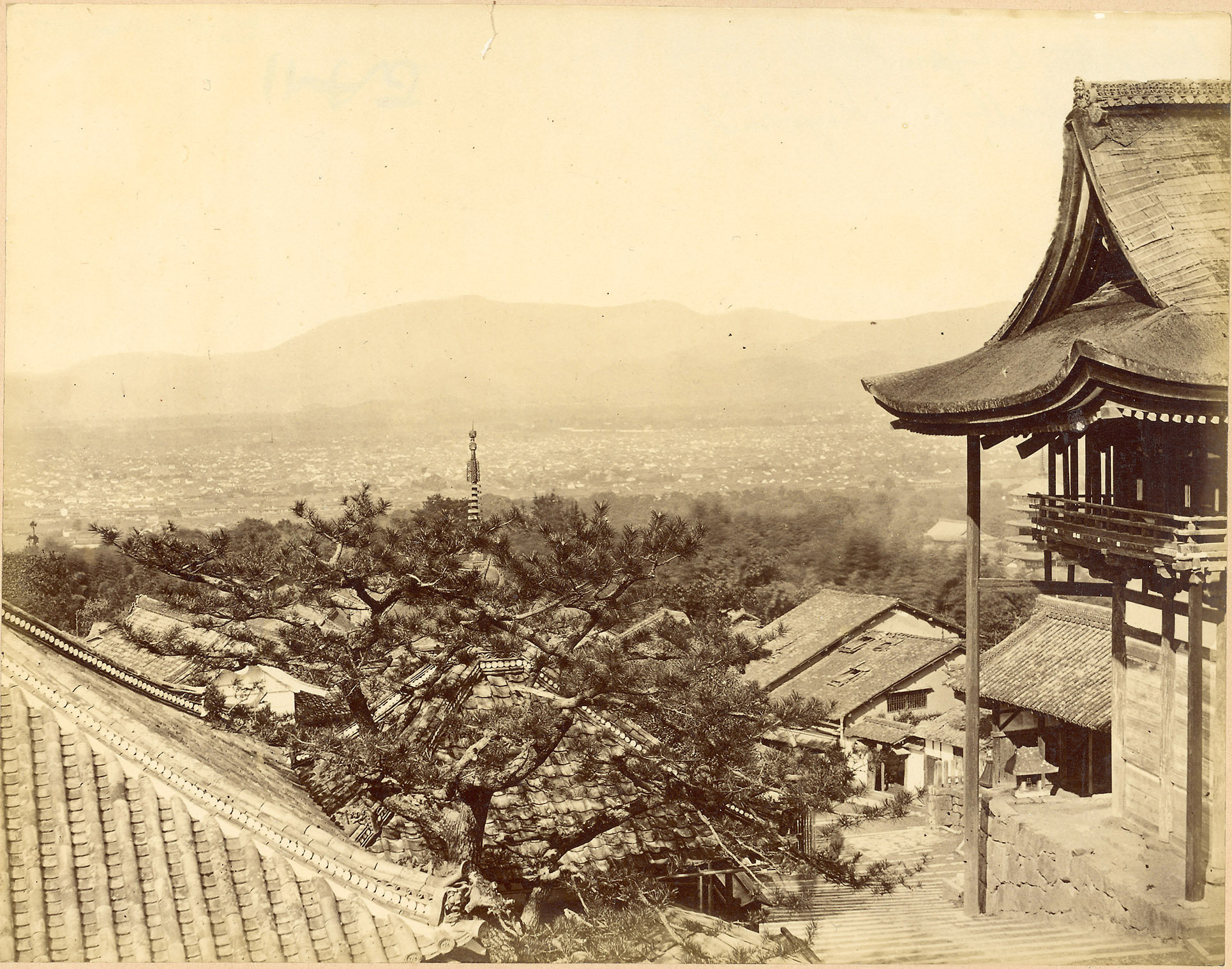
View of Kyoto from beside the Hondō of Kiyomizudera – 1870s

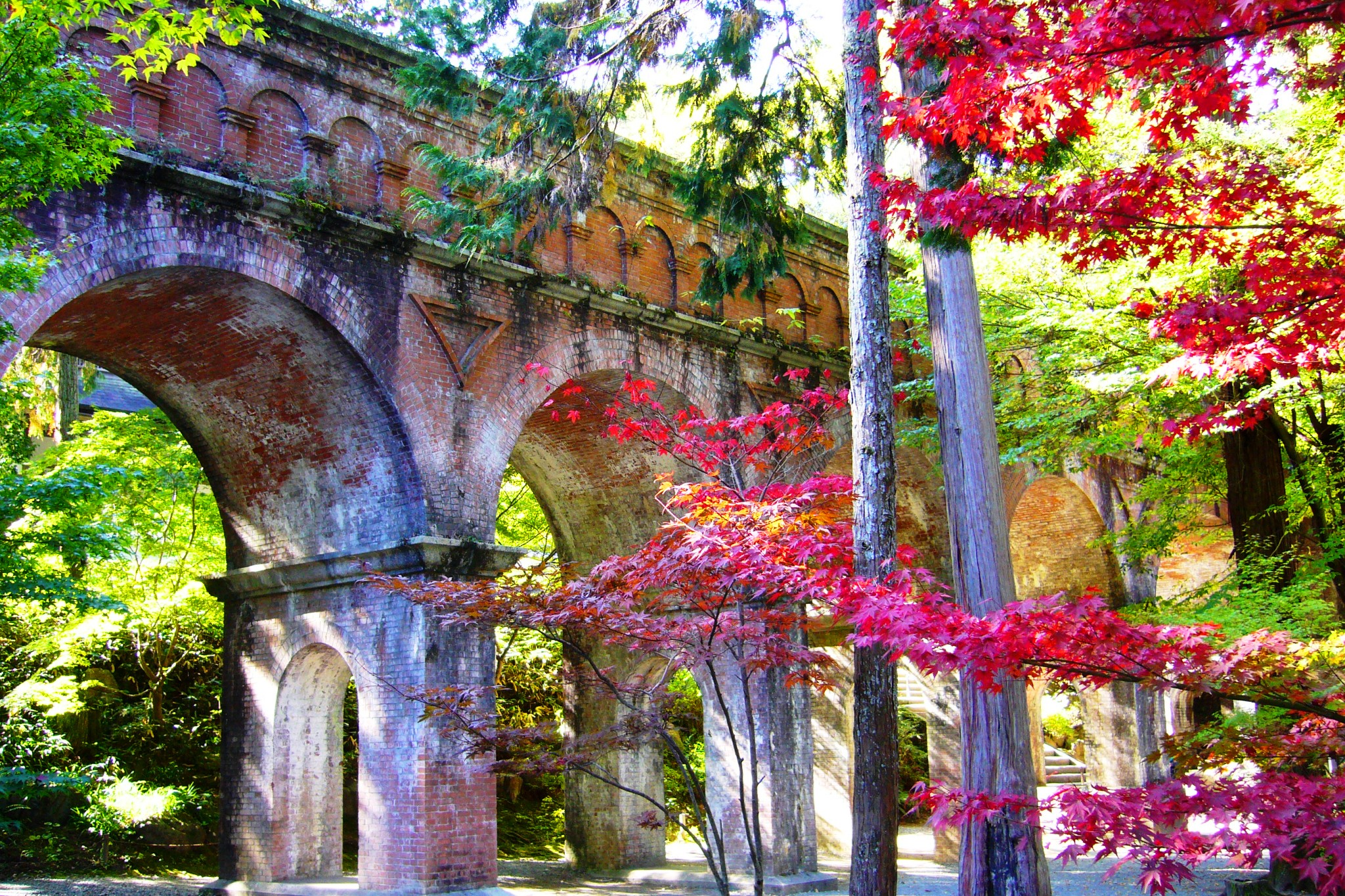
Nanzenji aqueduct

=== Contemporary history ===
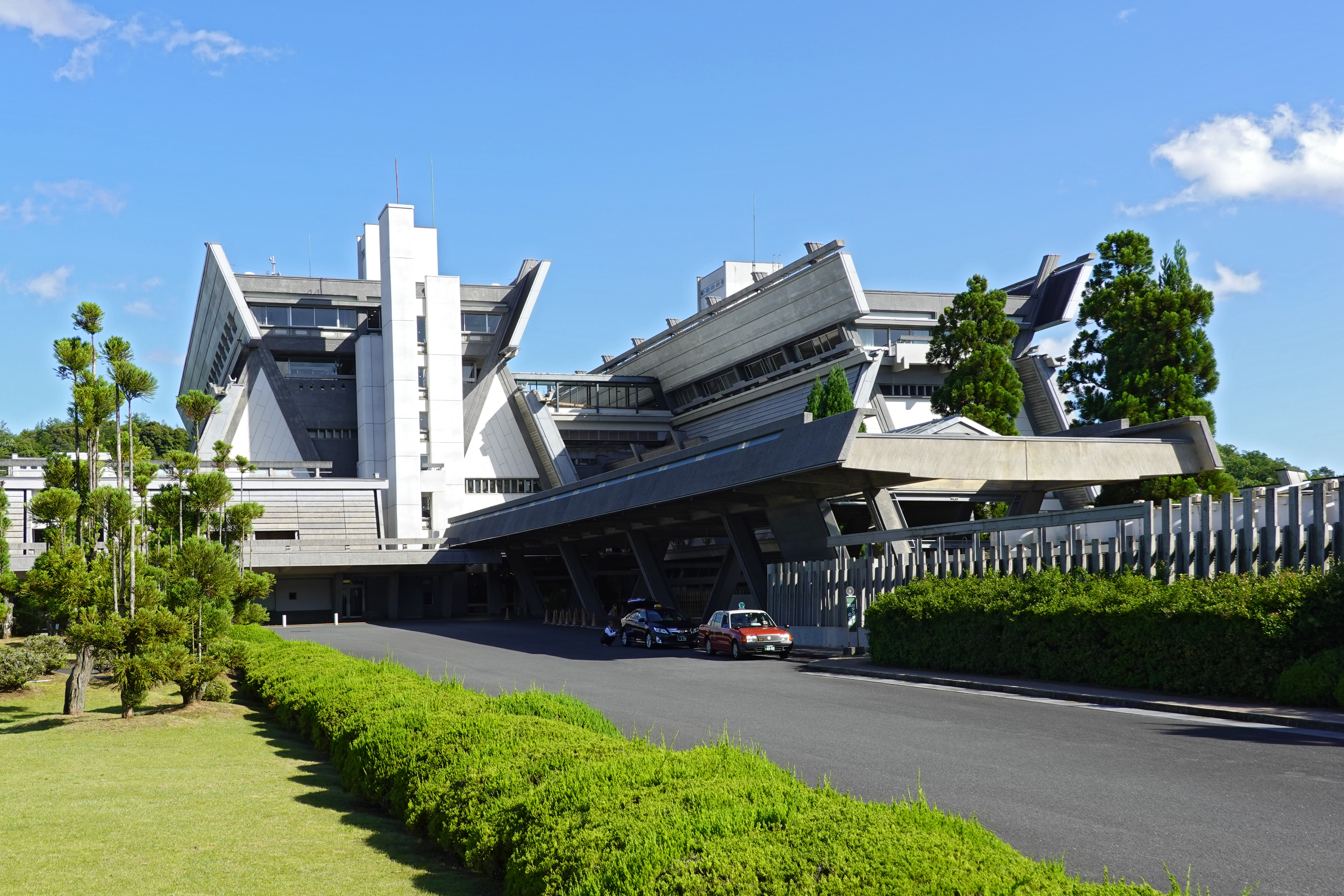
Kyoto International Conference Center

There was some consideration by the United States of targeting Kyoto with an atomic bomb at the end of World War II because of the possibility that the city's importance was great enough that its loss might persuade Japan to surrender. In the end, at the insistence of Henry L. Stimson, Secretary of War in the Roosevelt and Truman administrations, the city was removed from the list of targets and replaced by Nagasaki. The city was largely spared from conventional bombing as well, although small-scale air raids did result in casualties. During the occupation, the U.S. Sixth Army and I Corps were headquartered in Kyoto.

As a result, Kyoto is one of the few Japanese cities that still have an abundance of prewar buildings, such as the traditional townhouses known as machiya. However, modernization is continually breaking down traditional Kyoto in favor of newer architecture, such as the Kyōto Station complex.

Kyoto became a city designated by government ordinance on September 1, 1956. In 1994, 17 historic monuments in Kyoto were inscribed on the list as UNESCO World Heritage Sites. In 1997, Kyoto hosted the conference that resulted in the protocol on greenhouse gas emissions (United Nations Framework Convention on Climate Change).

== Geography ==
=== Topography ===
Kyoto is located in a valley, part of the Yamashiro (or Kyoto) Basin, in the eastern part of the mountainous region known as the Tamba highlands. The Yamashiro Basin is surrounded on three sides by mountains known as Higashiyama, Kitayama and Nishiyama (literally "east mountain", "north mountain" and "west mountain" respectively), with a maximum height of approximately 1,000 meters (3,281 ft) above sea level. This interior positioning results in hot summers and cold winters. There are three rivers in the basin, the Uji River to the south, the Katsura River to the west, and the Kamo River to the east. Kyoto City takes up 17.9% of the land in Kyoto Prefecture and has a total area of 827.9 square kilometers (319.7 sq mi).

Kyoto sits atop a large natural water table that provides the city with ample freshwater wells. Due to large-scale urbanization, the amount of rain draining into the table is dwindling and wells across the area are drying at an increasing rate.

=== Climate ===
Kyoto has a humid subtropical climate (Köppen: Cfa), featuring a marked seasonal variation in temperature and precipitation. Summers are hot and humid, but winters are relatively cold with occasional snowfall. Kyoto's rainy season begins around the middle of June and lasts until the end of July, yielding to a hot and sunny latter half of the summer. Kyoto is often affected by rain from typhoons during the summer and autumn.

Climate data for Kyoto (1991−2020 normals, extremes 1880−present)
Month	Jan	Feb	Mar	Apr	May	Jun	Jul	Aug	Sep	Oct	Nov	Dec	Year
Record high °C (°F)	19.9 (67.8)	22.9 (73.2)	25.7 (78.3)	30.7 (87.3)	34.9 (94.8)	37.2 (99.0)	39.8 (103.6)	39.8 (103.6)	38.1 (100.6)	33.6 (92.5)	26.9 (80.4)	22.8 (73.0)	39.8 (103.6)
Mean maximum °C (°F)	14.0 (57.2)	17.4 (63.3)	21.8 (71.2)	27.3 (81.1)	31.4 (88.5)	33.5 (92.3)	36.5 (97.7)	37.3 (99.1)	34.1 (93.4)	29.1 (84.4)	22.9 (73.2)	18.0 (64.4)	37.6 (99.7)
Mean daily maximum °C (°F)	9.1 (48.4)	10.0 (50.0)	14.1 (57.4)	20.1 (68.2)	25.1 (77.2)	28.1 (82.6)	32.0 (89.6)	33.7 (92.7)	29.2 (84.6)	23.4 (74.1)	17.3 (63.1)	11.6 (52.9)	21.1 (70.0)
Daily mean °C (°F)	4.8 (40.6)	5.4 (41.7)	8.8 (47.8)	14.4 (57.9)	19.5 (67.1)	23.3 (73.9)	27.3 (81.1)	28.5 (83.3)	24.4 (75.9)	18.4 (65.1)	12.5 (54.5)	7.2 (45.0)	16.2 (61.2)
Mean daily minimum °C (°F)	1.5 (34.7)	1.6 (34.9)	4.3 (39.7)	9.2 (48.6)	14.5 (58.1)	19.2 (66.6)	23.6 (74.5)	24.7 (76.5)	20.7 (69.3)	14.4 (57.9)	8.4 (47.1)	3.5 (38.3)	12.1 (53.8)
Mean minimum °C (°F)	−2.2 (28.0)	−2.0 (28.4)	−0.5 (31.1)	2.6 (36.7)	8.5 (47.3)	14.2 (57.6)	19.7 (67.5)	20.7 (69.3)	15.0 (59.0)	8.3 (46.9)	3.0 (37.4)	−0.6 (30.9)	−2.8 (27.0)
Record low °C (°F)	−11.9 (10.6)	−11.6 (11.1)	−8.2 (17.2)	−4.4 (24.1)	−0.3 (31.5)	4.9 (40.8)	10.6 (51.1)	11.8 (53.2)	7.8 (46.0)	0.2 (32.4)	−4.4 (24.1)	−9.4 (15.1)	−11.9 (10.6)
Average precipitation mm (inches)	53.3 (2.10)	65.1 (2.56)	106.2 (4.18)	117.0 (4.61)	151.4 (5.96)	199.7 (7.86)	223.6 (8.80)	153.8 (6.06)	178.5 (7.03)	143.2 (5.64)	73.9 (2.91)	57.3 (2.26)	1,522.9 (59.96)
Average snowfall cm (inches)	5 (2.0)	7 (2.8)	1 (0.4)	0 (0)	0 (0)	0 (0)	0 (0)	0 (0)	0 (0)	0 (0)	0 (0)	2 (0.8)	15 (5.9)
Average precipitation days (≥ 0.5 mm)	8.1	8.9	11.2	10.6	10.8	13.2	12.6	9.3	11.1	9.4	7.4	8.2	120.8
Average relative humidity (%)	67	65	61	59	60	66	69	66	67	68	68	68	65
Mean monthly sunshine hours	123.5	122.2	155.4	177.3	182.4	133.1	142.7	182.7	142.7	156.0	140.7	134.4	1,793.1
Source: Japan Meteorological Agency

=== Cityscape ===
Kyoto contains roughly 2,000 temples and shrines. The main business district is located to the south of the Kyoto Imperial Palace. In the center of the city, there are several covered shopping arcades only open to pedestrian traffic, such as Teramachi Street and Shinkyōgoku Street.

The original city was arranged in accordance with traditional Chinese feng shui following the model of the ancient Chinese capital of Chang'an/Luoyang. The Imperial Palace faced south, resulting in Ukyō (the right sector of the capital) being on the west, while Sakyō (the left sector) is on the east. The streets in the modern-day wards of Kamigyō-ku, Nakagyō-ku, and Shimogyō-ku still follow a grid pattern. Areas outside of the city center do not follow the same grid pattern, though streets throughout Kyoto are referred to by name, a practice that is rare in most regions of Japan.

Gallery

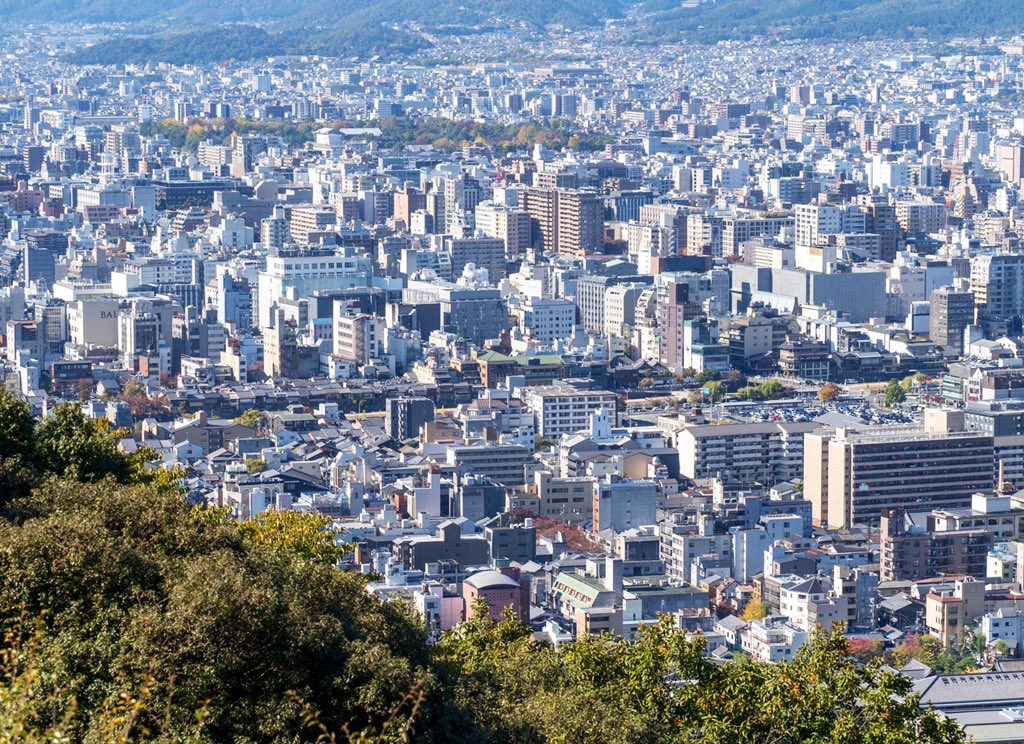
View of Kyoto CBD from Shōren-in (2020)

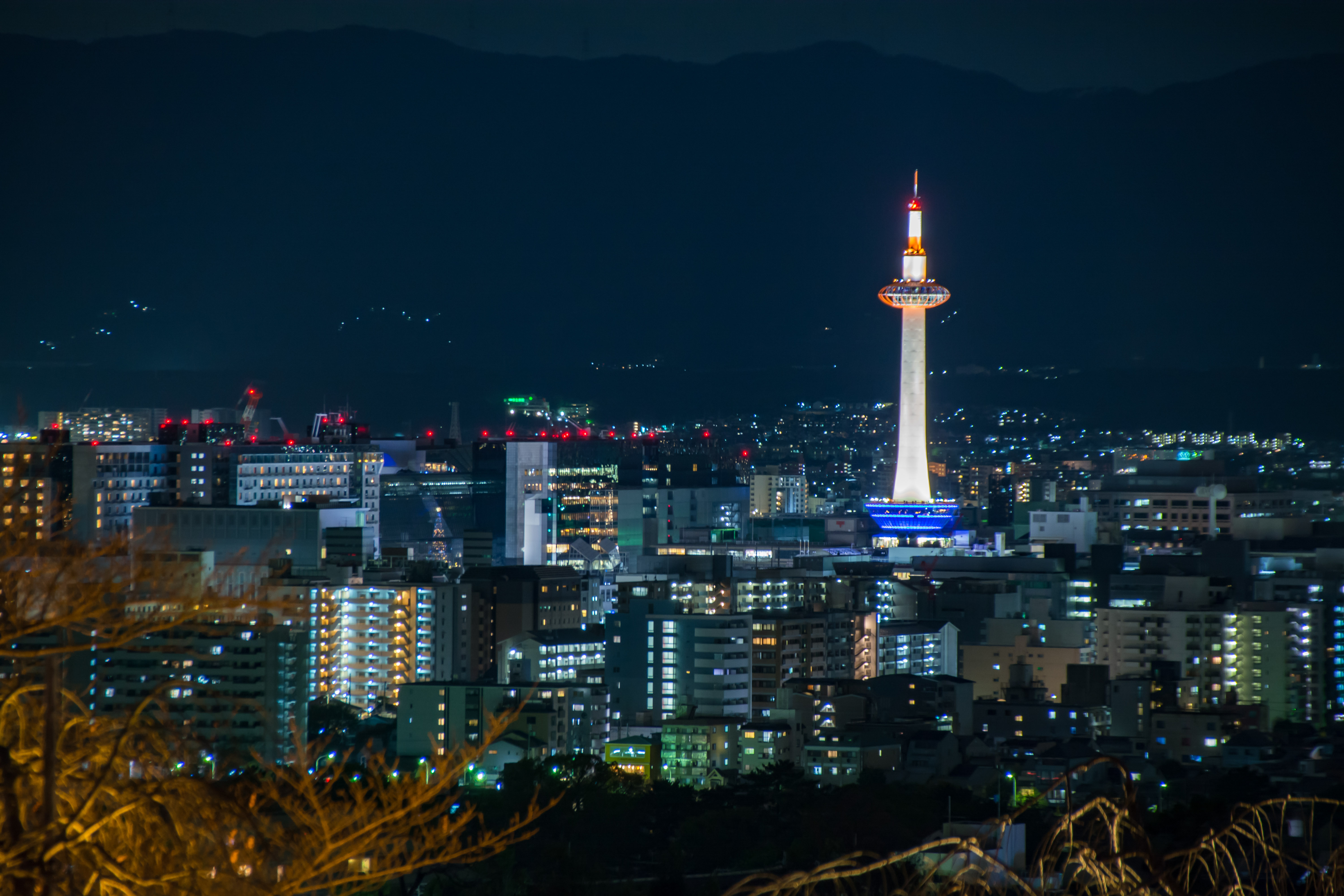
Kyoto Tower night skyline (2015)

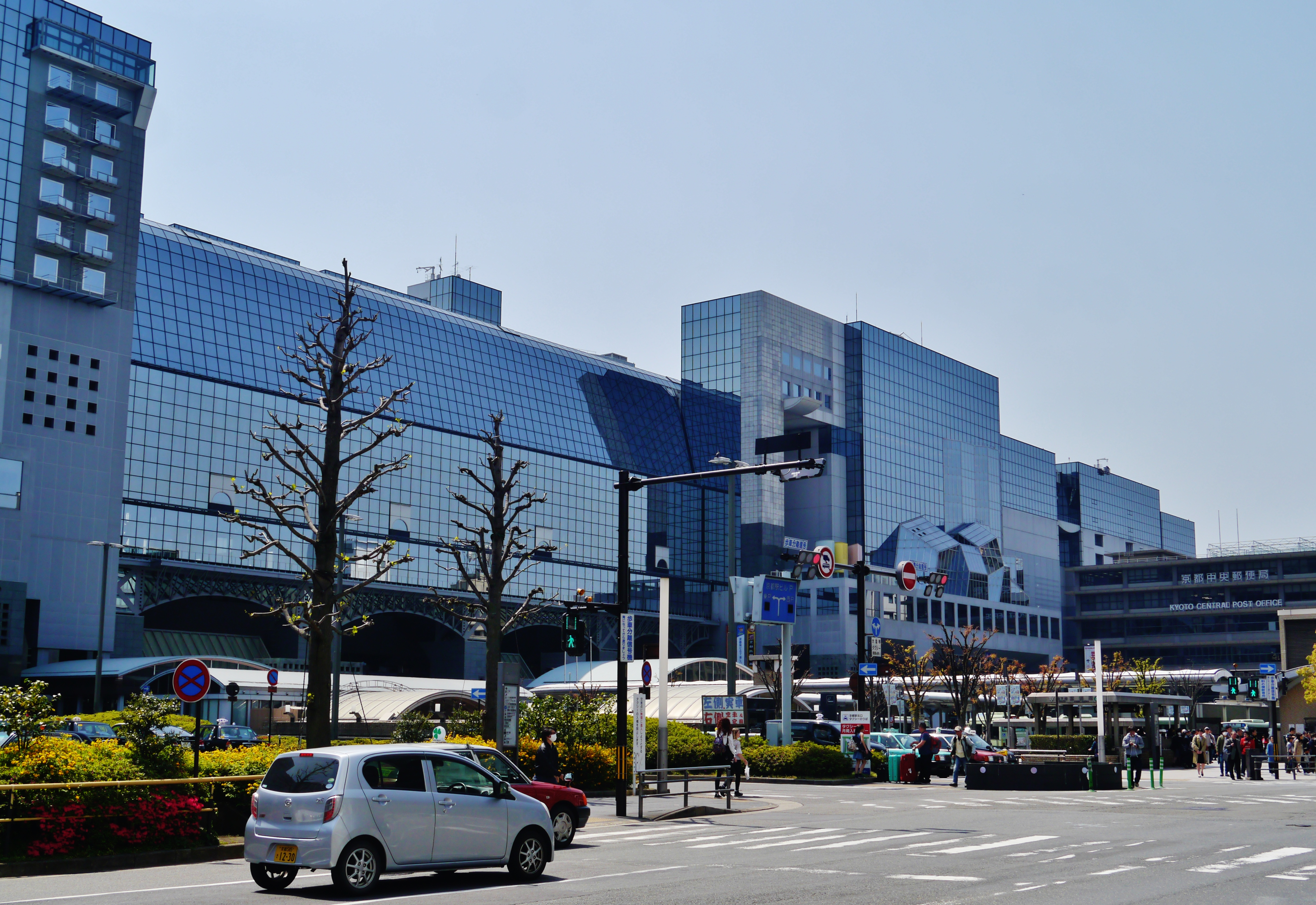
Kyoto Station (2018)

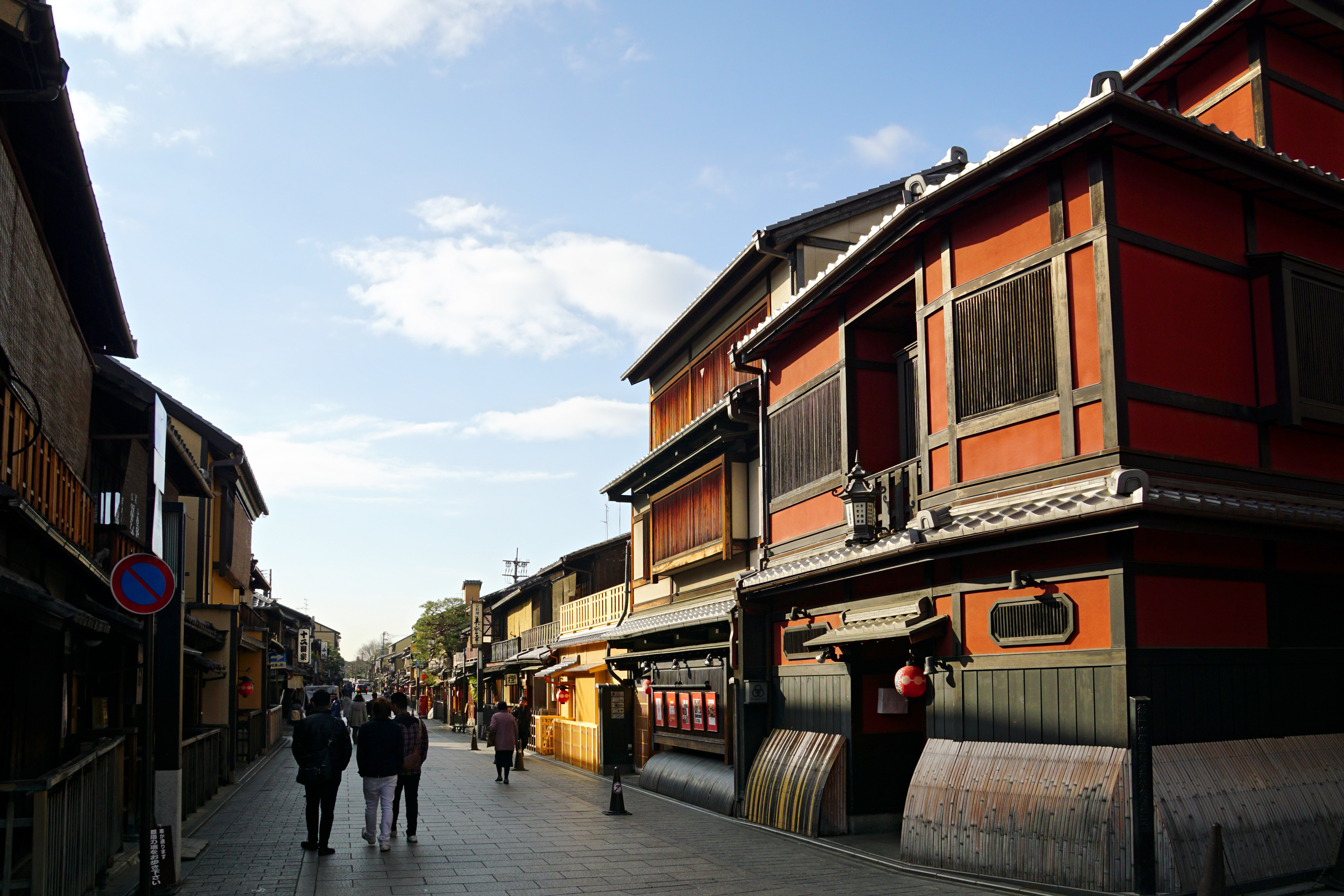
Gion (2015)

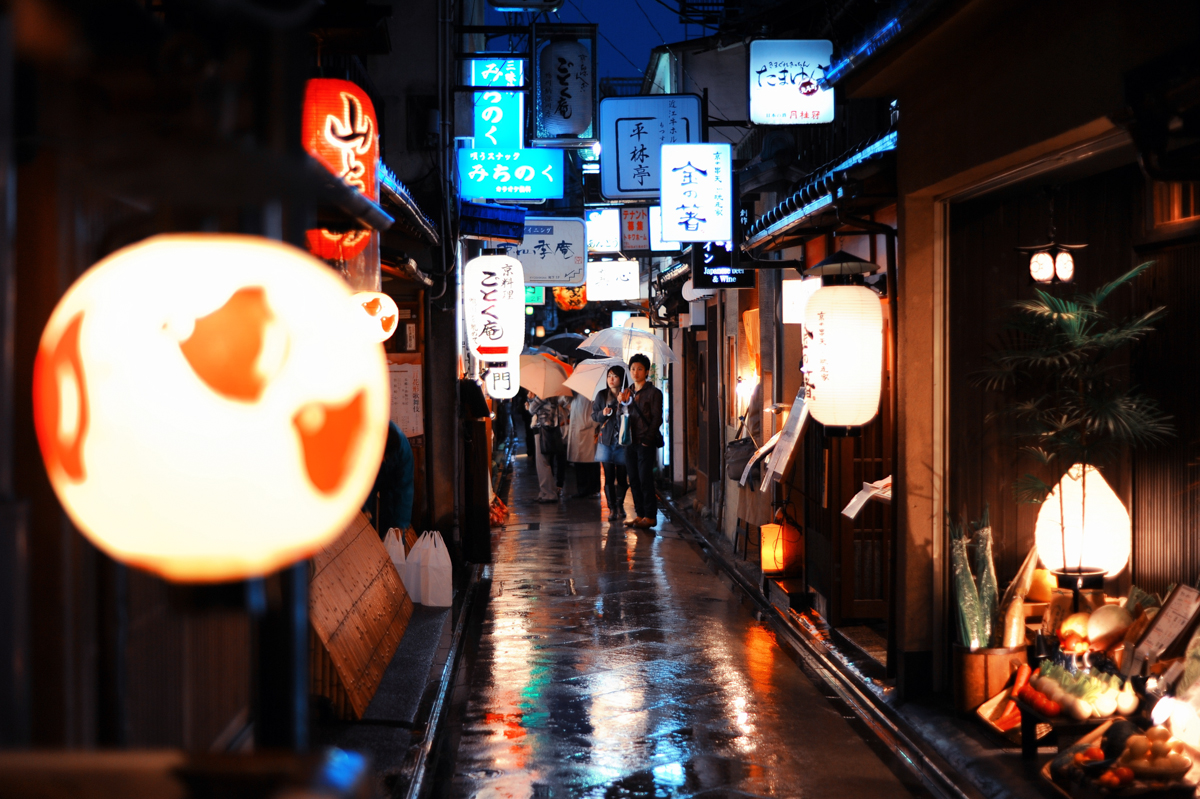
Ponto-chō (2010)

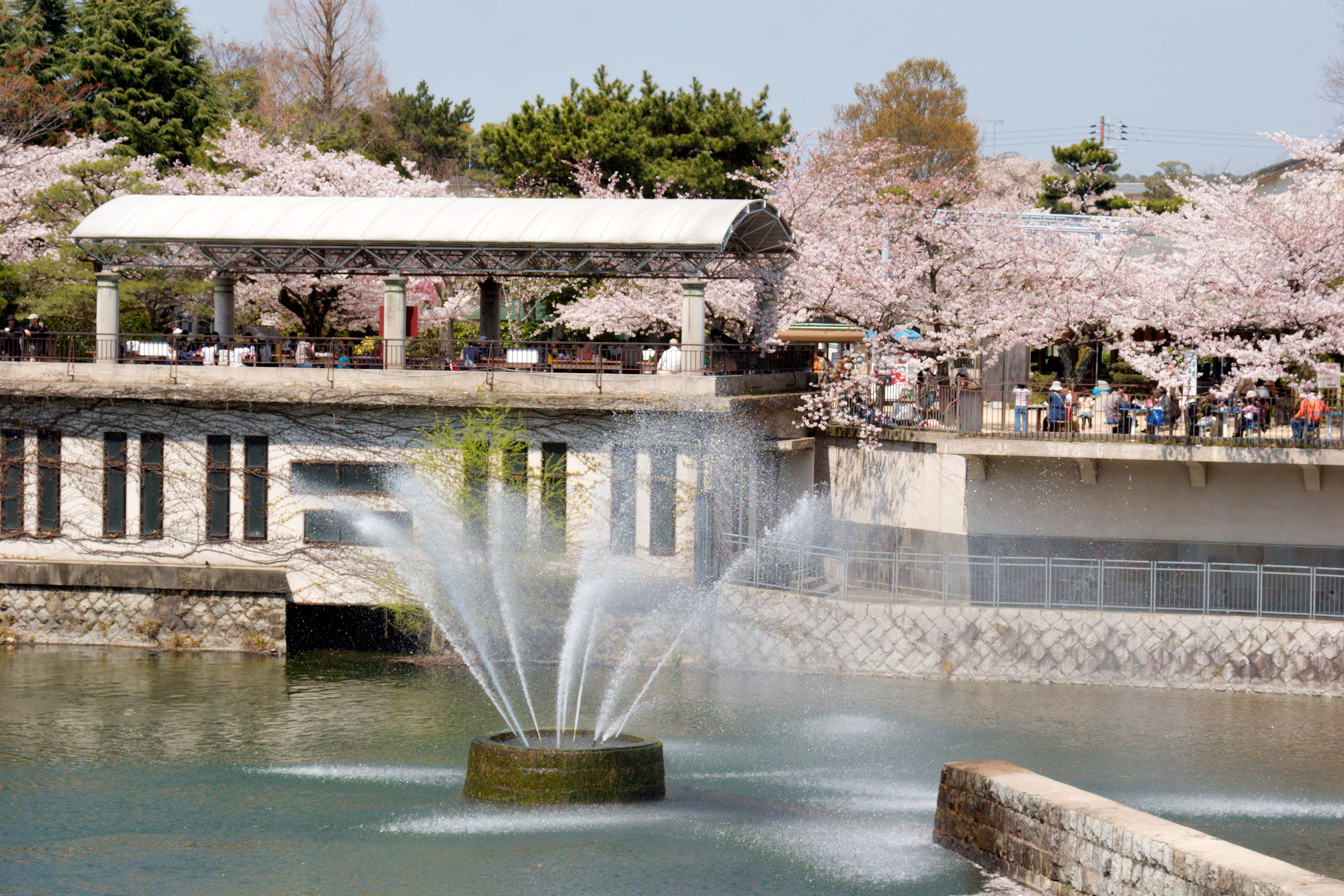
Okazaki park（2009）

== Administration ==
=== Local Government ===
The city of Kyoto is governed by the mayor of Kyoto and the Kyoto City Assembly, a municipal council.

==== Kyoto City Assembly ====
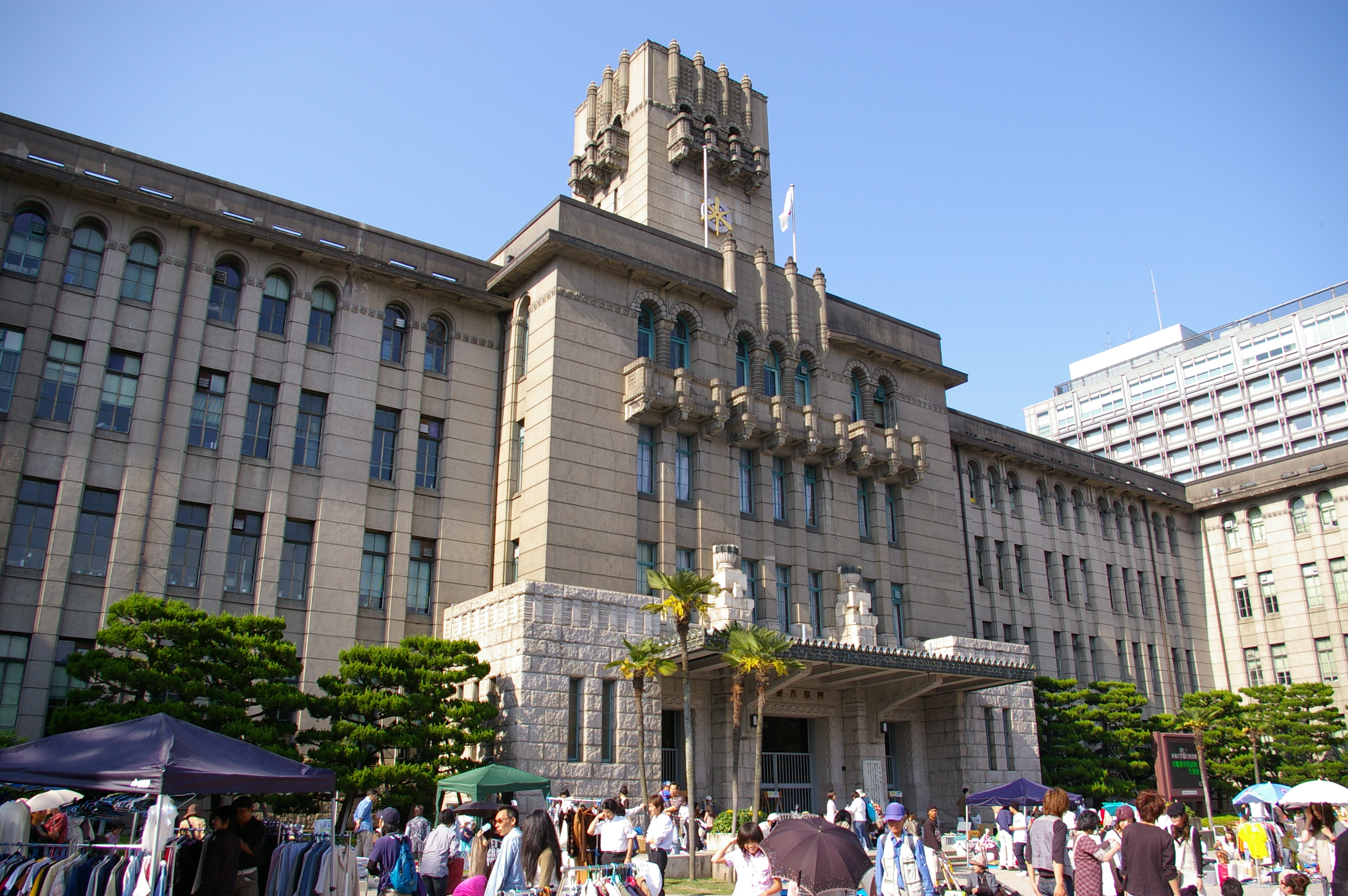
Kyoto City Hall

The legislative city assembly has 67 elected members, and terms are four years in length. As of 2024, the assembly is controlled by a coalition of members affiliated with the Liberal Democratic Party, Komeito, and the Democratic Civic Forum.

Parliamentary group name	Number of seats (as of January 18, 2024)
Liberal Democratic Party	18
Japan Innovation Party/Kyoto Party/DPP	18
Japanese Communist Party	14
Komeito	11
Democratic Civic Forum	2
Independent	4

==== List of mayors ====
Between the founding of the modern city and 1898, the governor of Kyoto Prefecture also acted as the mayor of the city of Kyoto. From 1898 through the Second World War, mayors were nominated by the Kyoto City Assembly and appointed by the Minister of Home Affairs.

Since 1947, mayors of Kyoto have been chosen by direct election to four-year terms. As of 2024, there have been ten mayors elected using this system. While some mayors have resigned or died in office, no mayor has lost a reelection bid in the postwar period. In the 2024 Kyoto mayoral election, independent candidate Koji Matsui was elected for the first time, supported by the Liberal Democratic Party, Komeito, the Constitutional Democratic Party, and the Democratic Party for the People.

#	Name	Entered office	Left office
1	Masao Kambe (神戸正雄)	April 7, 1947	January 6, 1950
2	Gizō Takayama (高山義三)	February 10, 1950	February 4, 1966
3	Seiichi Inoue (井上清一)	February 5, 1966	January 8, 1967
4	Kiyoshi Tomii (富井清)	February 28, 1967	February 25, 1971
5	Motoki Funahashi (舩橋求己)	February 26, 1971	July 26, 1981
6	Masahiko Imagawa (今川正彦)	September 1, 1981	August 29, 1989
7	Tomoyuki Tanabe (田邊朋之)	August 30, 1989	January 29, 1996
8	Yorikane Masumoto (桝本頼兼)	February 26, 1996	February 24, 2008
9	Daisaku Kadokawa (門川大作)	February 25, 2008	February 24, 2024
10	Koji Matsui (松井孝治)	February 25, 2024	present

==== Wards ====
In the 1870s, the city was divided into a northern ward (Kamigyō-ku) and a southern ward (Shimogyō-ku), each working as individual administrative divisions of Kyoto Prefecture. The modern municipality was created by the unification of these wards into the city of Kyoto in 1889.

Due to the creation of new administrative districts and a number of municipal mergers that took place between the 1920s and the 1970s, the contemporary city of Kyoto is divided into eleven wards (区, ku). The central wards, located to the west of the Kamo River, are small and densely populated. The city hall is located in Nakagyō-ku, and the Kyoto prefectural offices are located in present-day Kamigyō-ku.

Wards of Kyoto
	Place name					Map of Kyoto
	Rōmaji	Kanji	Population	Land area in km^{2}	Pop. density per km^{2}	
1	Kita-ku	北区	117,165	94.88	1,230	Map of Kyoto's wards
2	Kamigyō-ku	上京区	83,832	7.03	11,900	Map of Kyoto's wards
3	Nakagyō-ku (administrative center)	中京区	110,488	7.41	14,900	Map of Kyoto's wards
4	Shimogyō-ku	下京区	82,784	6.78	12,200	Map of Kyoto's wards
5	Minami-ku	南区	101,970	15.81	6,450	Map of Kyoto's wards
6	Nishikyō-ku	西京区	149,837	59.24	2,530	Map of Kyoto's wards
7	Ukyō-ku	右京区	202,047	292.07	690	Map of Kyoto's wards
8	Sakyō-ku	左京区	166,039	246.77	670	Map of Kyoto's wards
9	Higashiyama-ku	東山区	36,602	7.48	4,890	Map of Kyoto's wards
10	Yamashina-ku	山科区	135,101	28.70	4,710	Map of Kyoto's wards
11	Fushimi-ku	伏見区	277,858	61.66	4,510	Map of Kyoto's wards

== Demographics ==
Historical population
Year	Pop.	±%
1873	238,663	—
1889	279,165	+17.0%
1900	371,600	+33.1%
1910	470,033	+26.5%
1920	736,462	+56.7%
1925	860,878	+16.9%
1930	987,777	+14.7%
1935	1,117,439	+13.1%
1940	1,127,870	+0.9%
1945	1,041,700	−7.6%
1950	1,130,185	+8.5%
1955	1,229,808	+8.8%
1960	1,295,012	+5.3%
1965	1,374,159	+6.1%
1970	1,427,376	+3.9%
1975	1,468,833	+2.9%
1980	1,473,065	+0.3%
1985	1,486,402	+0.9%
1990	1,461,103	−1.7%
1995	1,470,902	+0.7%
2000	1,467,785	−0.2%
2005	1,474,811	+0.5%
2010	1,474,015	−0.1%
2015	1,475,183	+0.1%
2020	1,463,723	−0.8%
2025	1,431,419	−2.2%

Kyoto was the largest city in Japan until the late 16th century, when its population was surpassed by those of Osaka and Edo. Before World War II, Kyoto vied with Kobe and Nagoya to rank as the fourth- or fifth-largest city in Japan. Having avoided most wartime destruction, it was again the third-largest city in 1947. By 1960 it had fallen to fifth again, and by 1990 it had fallen to seventh. As of January 2022, it was the ninth-largest city in Japan by population and had led the country in population decrease for two consecutive years. However, the population of the city rises during standard working hours, and Kyoto ranks seventh in Japan in terms of daytime population.

Approximately 55% of the total population of Kyoto Prefecture is concentrated in the city of Kyoto, which is the highest ratio among the prefectures of Japan.

== Economy ==
GDP (PPP) per capita
Year	US$
1975	5,324
1980	9,523
1985	13,870
1990	20,413
1995	23,627
2000	26,978
2005	32,189
2010	36,306
2015	41,410

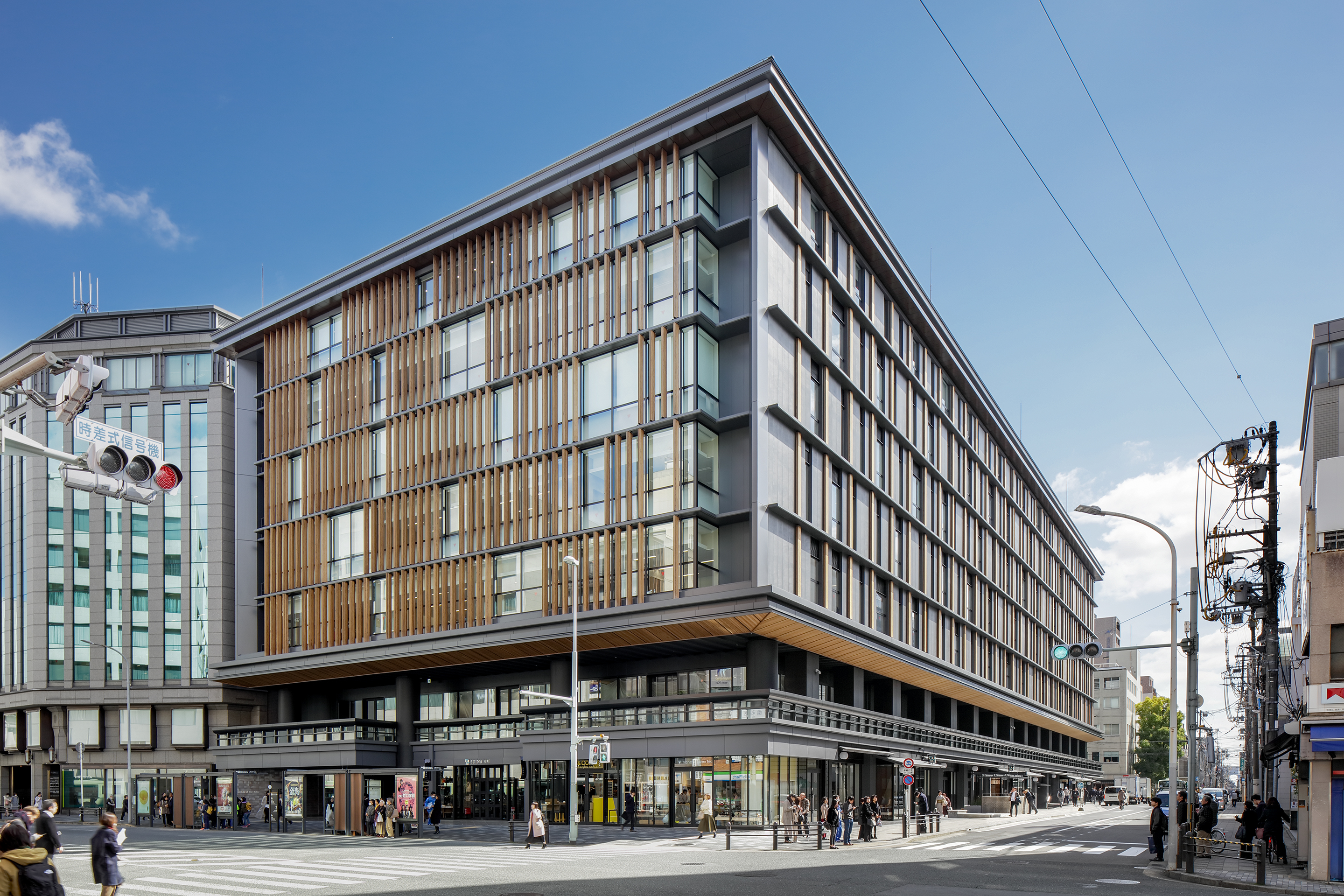
Kyoto Economic Center

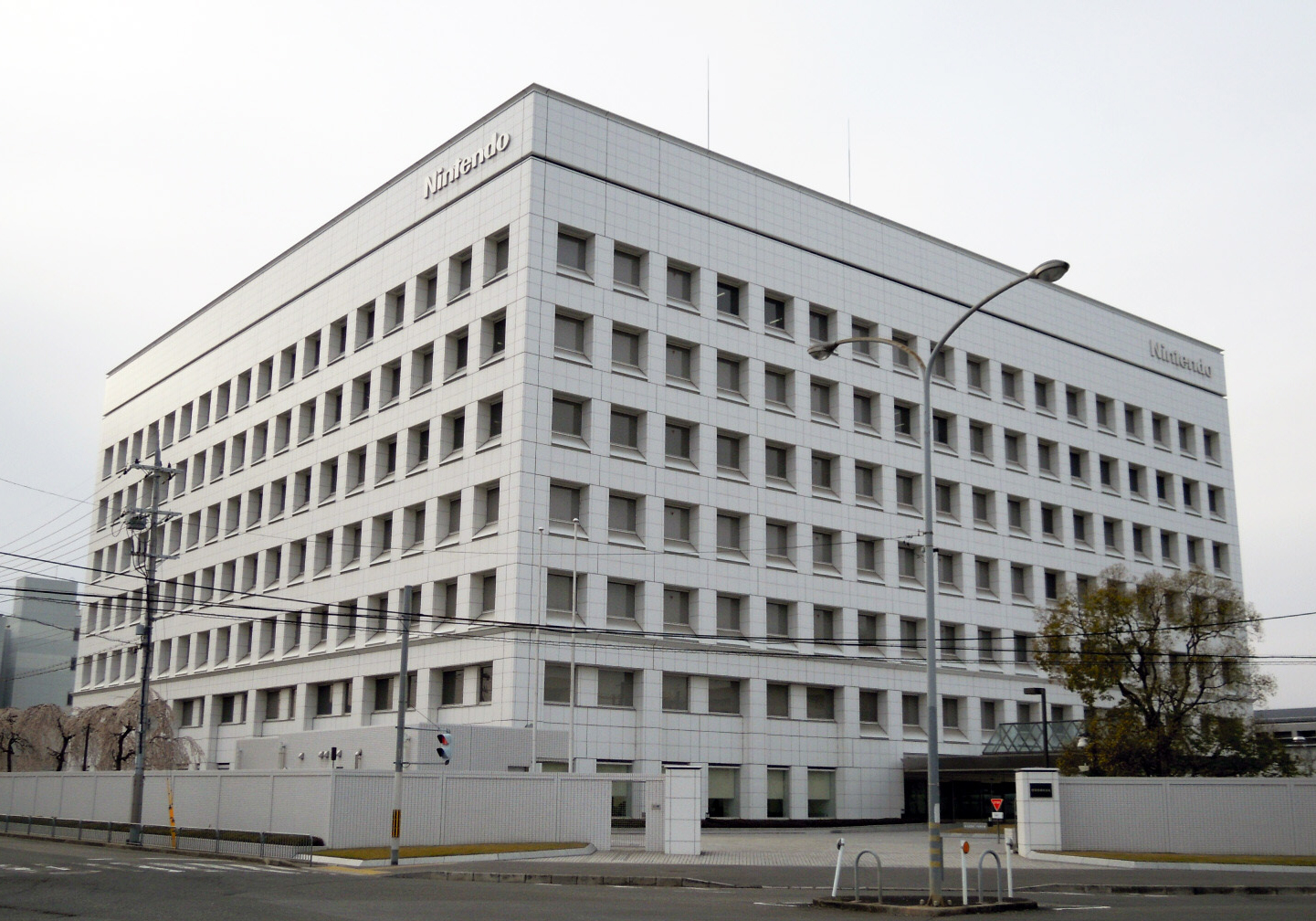
Nintendo main headquarters

Information technology and electronics are key industries in Kyoto. The city is home to the headquarters of Nintendo, Intelligent Systems, SCREEN Holdings, Tose, Hatena, Omron, Kyocera, Shimadzu, Rohm Semiconductor, Horiba, Nidec Corporation, Nichicon, Nissin Electric, and GS Yuasa.

Domestic and international tourism contributes significantly to Kyoto's economy. In 2014, the city government announced that a record number of tourists had visited Kyoto. As a result of a sharp decline in tourism during the COVID-19 pandemic, the mayor acknowledged in 2021 "the possibility of bankruptcy in the next decade" and announced job cuts in the administration and cuts in social assistance, including reductions in funding for home care.

Traditional Japanese crafts are also a major industry of Kyoto; Kyoto's kimono weavers are particularly renowned, and the city remains the premier center of kimono manufacturing. Sake brewing is another prominent traditional industry in Kyoto, and the headquarters of major sake brewers Gekkeikan and Takara Holdings are found in Kyoto.

Other notable businesses headquartered in Kyoto include Aiful, Ishida, Nissen Holdings, Gyoza no Ohsho, Sagawa Express, Volks, and Wacoal.

== Transportation ==
=== Railways ===
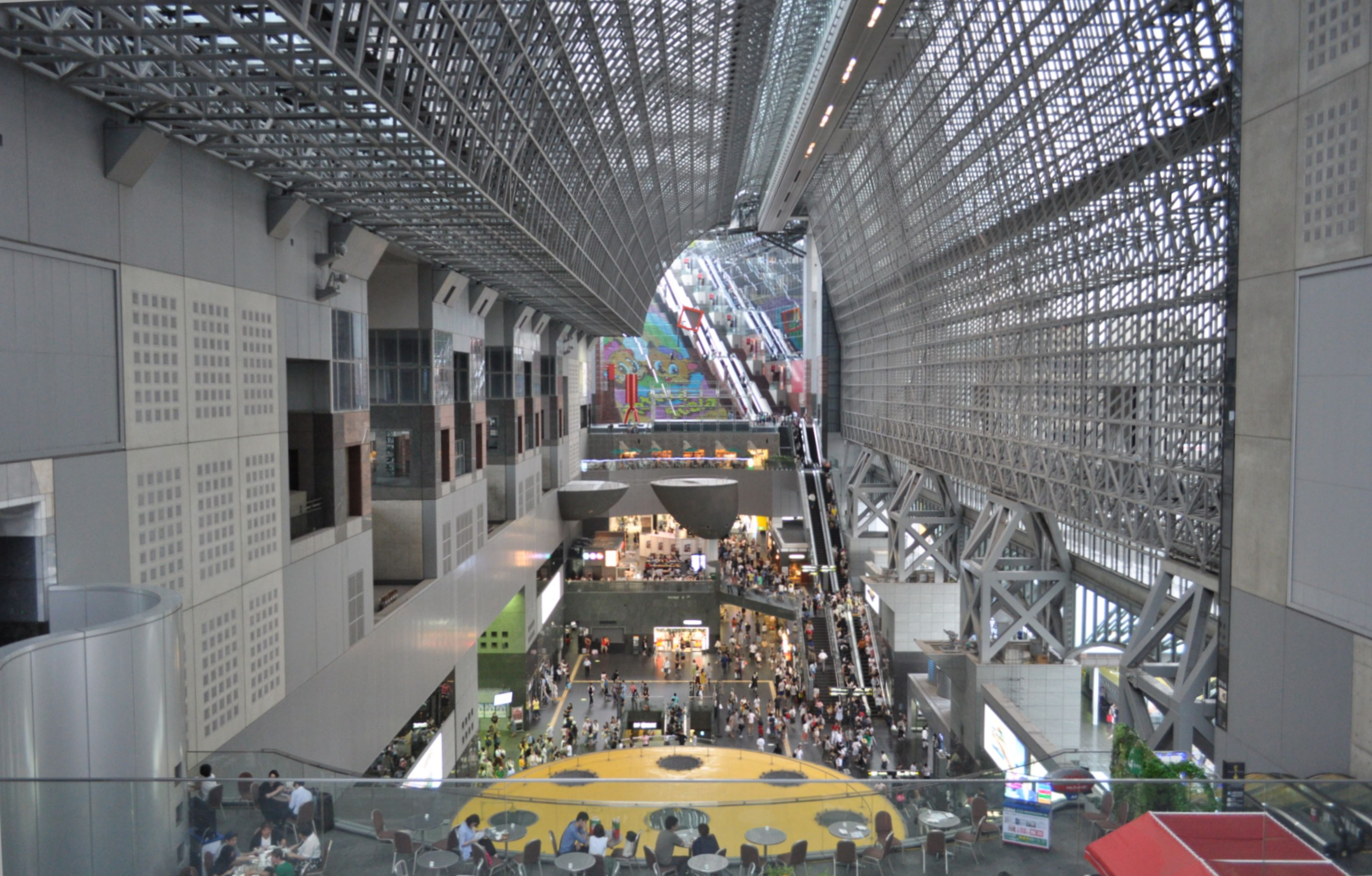
The interior of Kyōto Station

Kyoto is served by rail transportation systems operated by several different companies and organizations. The city's main gateway terminal, Kyōto Station, connects the Tōkaidō Shinkansen bullet train line with five JR West lines, a Kintetsu line, and a municipal subway line.

The Keihan Electric Railway, the Hankyu Railway, and other rail networks also offer frequent services within the city and to other cities and suburbs in the Kinki region. Although Kyoto does not have its own commercial airport, the limited express Haruka operated by JR West carries passengers from Kansai International Airport to Kyōto Station in 73 minutes.

The Kyoto Railway Museum in Shimogyō-ku, operated by JR West, displays many steam, diesel, and electric locomotives used in Japan from the 1880s to the present.

==== High-speed rail ====
The Tokaidō Shinkansen, operated by JR Central, provides high-speed rail service linking Kyoto with Nagoya, Yokohama, and Tokyo to the east and with nearby Osaka to the west. Beyond Osaka, many trains boarding at Kyoto continue on the San'yō Shinkansen route managed by JR West, providing access to cities including Kobe, Okayama, Hiroshima, Kitakyushu, and Fukuoka. The trip from Tokyo to Kyoto takes around 2.5 hours, and the trip from Hakata Station in Fukuoka to Kyoto takes just over three hours by the fastest train service Nozomi. All Shinkansen trains stop at Kyōto Station, including Hikari and Kodama trains.

==== Conventional lines ====
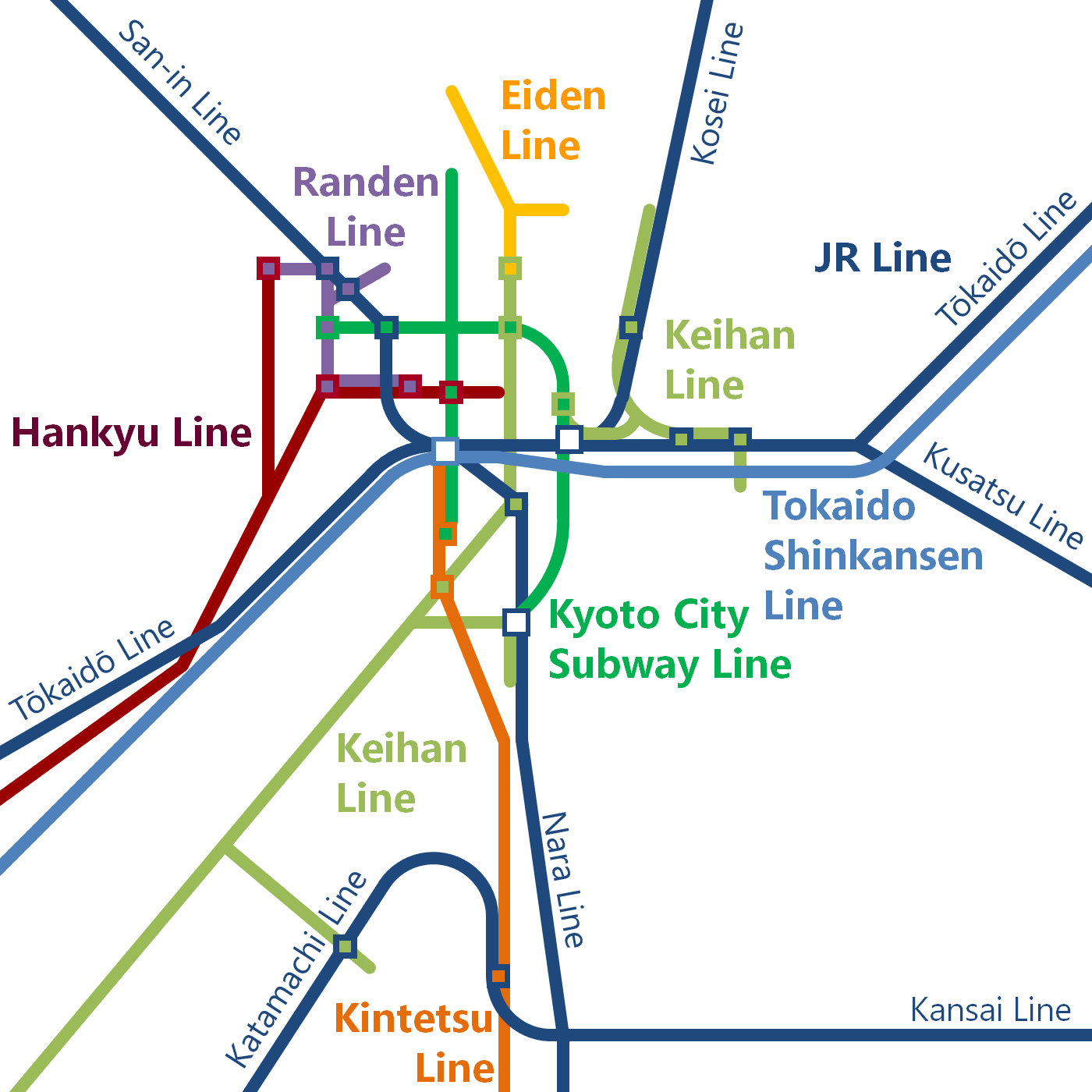
Railway map around Kyoto City

Hankyu Railway
- Hankyu Arashiyama Line
- Hankyu Kyoto Main Line
Keihan Electric Railway
- Keihan Main Line
  - Keihan Ōtō Line
- Keihan Keishin Line
- Keihan Uji Line
Kintetsu Railway
- Kintetsu Kyoto Line
Sagano Scenic Railway
- Sagano Scenic Line
West Japan Railway Company (JR West)
- Kosei Line
- Nara Line
- San'in Main Line (Sagano Line)
- Tōkaidō Main Line (JR Kyoto Line/Biwako Line)

==== Subways ====
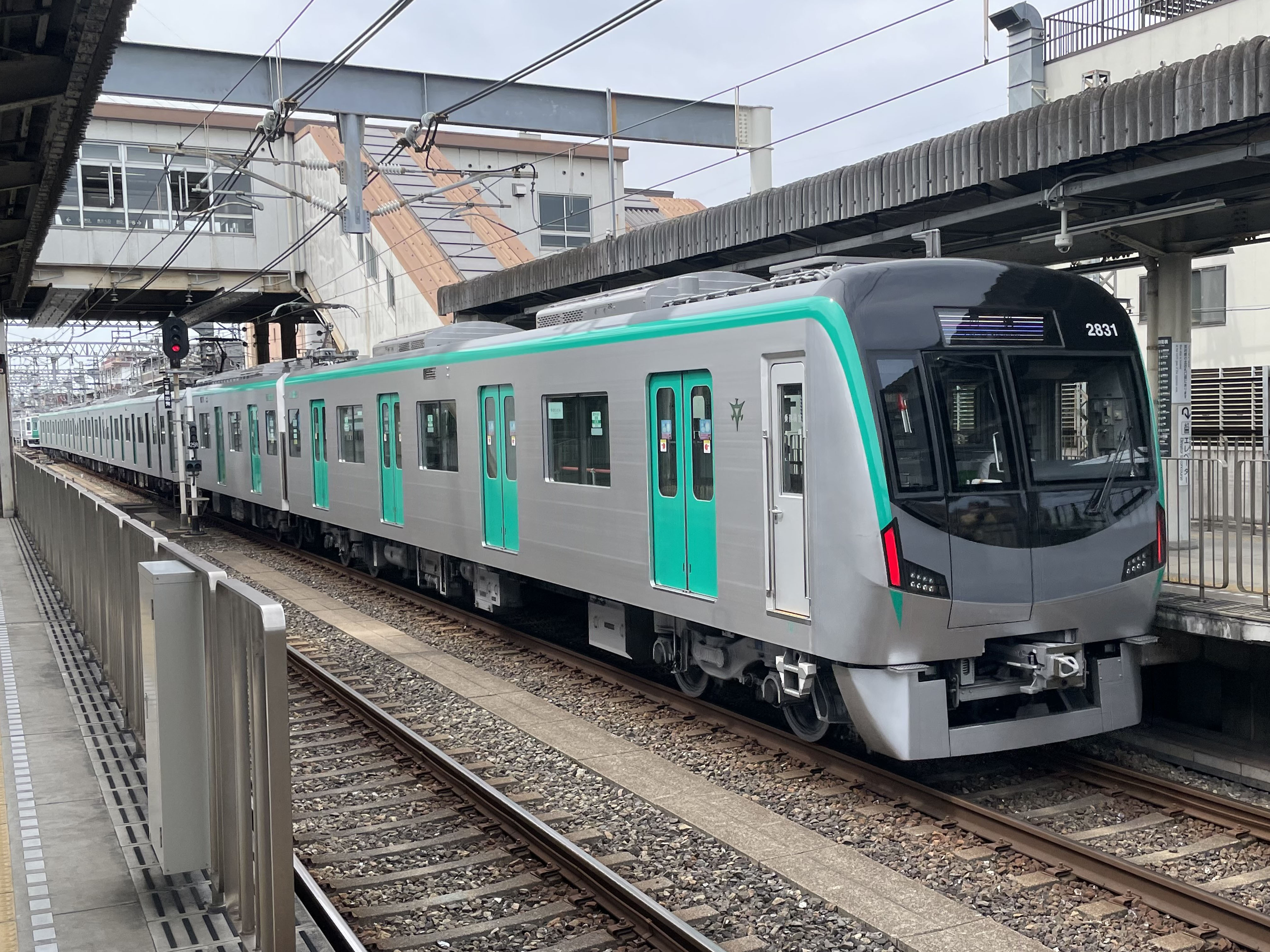
A Karasuma Line subway train at Takeda Station

The Kyoto Municipal Transportation Bureau operates the Kyoto Municipal Subway consisting of two lines: the Karasuma Line and the Tōzai Line. The two lines are linked at Karasuma Oike Station near Kyoto's central business district.

The Karasuma Line runs primarily north to south between the terminal of Kokusaikaikan Station and Takeda Station, and takes its name from the fact that trains run beneath Karasuma Street between Kitaōji Station in Kita-ku and Jūjō Station in Minami-ku. The Karasuma Line connects to the Hankyu Kyoto Main Line at the intersection of Shijō Karasuma in Kyoto's central business district and to JR lines and the Kyoto Kintetsu Line at Kyōto Station. In addition, the Transportation Bureau and Kintetsu jointly operate through services which continue to Kintetsu Nara Station in Nara, the capital city of Nara Prefecture.

The Tōzai Line runs from the southeastern area of the city towards the center, then east to west (tōzai in Japanese) through the Kyoto downtown area where trains run beneath the east–west streets of Sanjō Street, Oike Street, and Oshikōji Street. The Keihan Keishin Line has been integrated into this line, and thus Keihan provides through services to Hamaōtsu in the neighboring city of Ōtsu, the capital of Shiga Prefecture. Within the city of Kyoto, the Tōzai Line also connects to the Keihan lines at Yamashina Station, Misasagi Station, and Sanjō Keihan Station, and to the Keifuku Electric Railroad at the terminal of Uzumasa Tenjingawa Station.

==== Tramways ====
Eizan Electric Railway (Eiden)
- Eizan Kurama Line
- Eizan Main Line
Keifuku Electric Railroad (Randen)
- Keifuku Arashiyama Main Line
- Keifuku Kitano Line

=== Buses ===
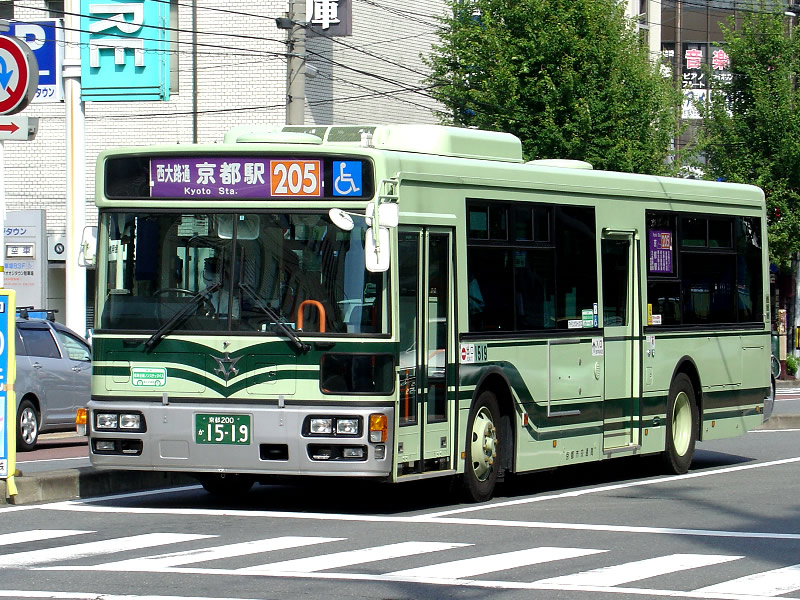
A typical Kyoto Municipal Bus

Kyoto's municipal bus network is extensive. Private carriers also operate within the city. Many tourists join commuters on the public buses, or take tour buses. Kyoto's buses have announcements in English and electronic signs with stops written in the Latin alphabet. Buses operating on routes within the city, the region, and the nation stop at Kyōto Station. In addition to Kyōto Station, bus transfer is available at the intersection of Shijō Kawaramachi, Sanjō Keihan Station, and the intersection of Karasuma Kitaōji near Kitaōji Station.

=== Roads ===
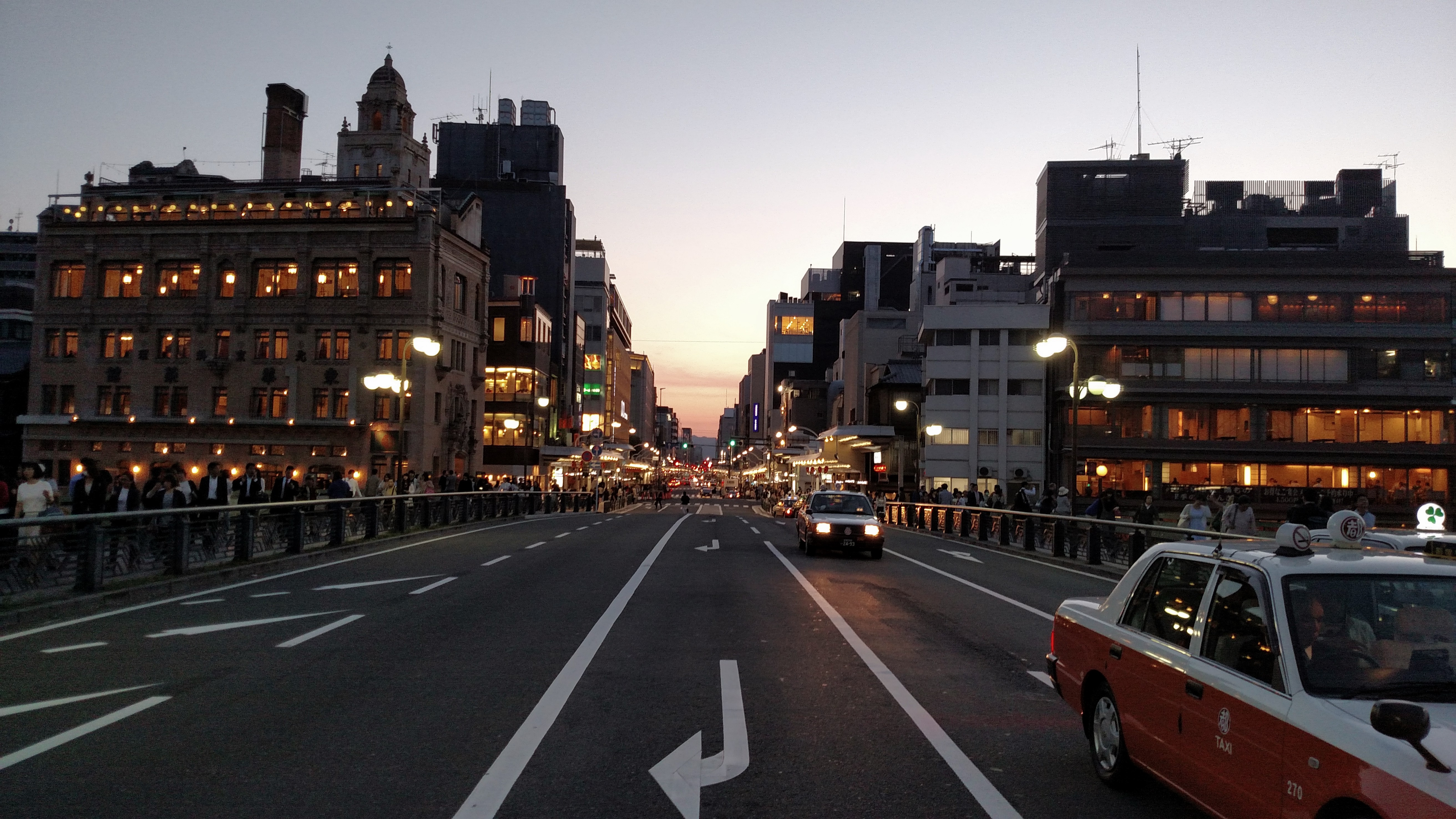
Shijō Street

Because many older streets in Kyoto are narrow, there are a significant number of one-way roads without sidewalks. Cycling is a common form of personal transportation in the city, although there are few areas set aside for bicycle parking and bicycles parked in restricted areas are impounded.

Kyoto has fewer toll-highways than other Japanese cities of comparable size. There are nine national highways in the city of Kyoto: Route 1, Route 8, Route 9, Route 24, Route 162, Route 171, Route 367, Route 477, and Route 478.

The city is connected with other parts of Japan by the Meishin Expressway, which has two interchanges in the city: Kyoto-higashi Interchange (Kyoto East) in Yamashina-ku and Kyoto-minami Interchange (Kyoto South) in Fushimi-ku. The Kyoto Jūkan Expressway connects the city to the northern regions of Kyoto Prefecture. The Second Keihan Highway is another bypass to Osaka.

Traditionally, trade and haulage took place by waterway, and there continue to be a number of navigable rivers and canals in Kyoto. In contemporary Kyoto, however, waterways are no longer commonly used for transportation of passengers or goods, other than for limited sightseeing purposes such as excursion boats on the Hozu River and cormorant fishing boats on the Ōi River.

== Education ==
=== Tertiary education ===
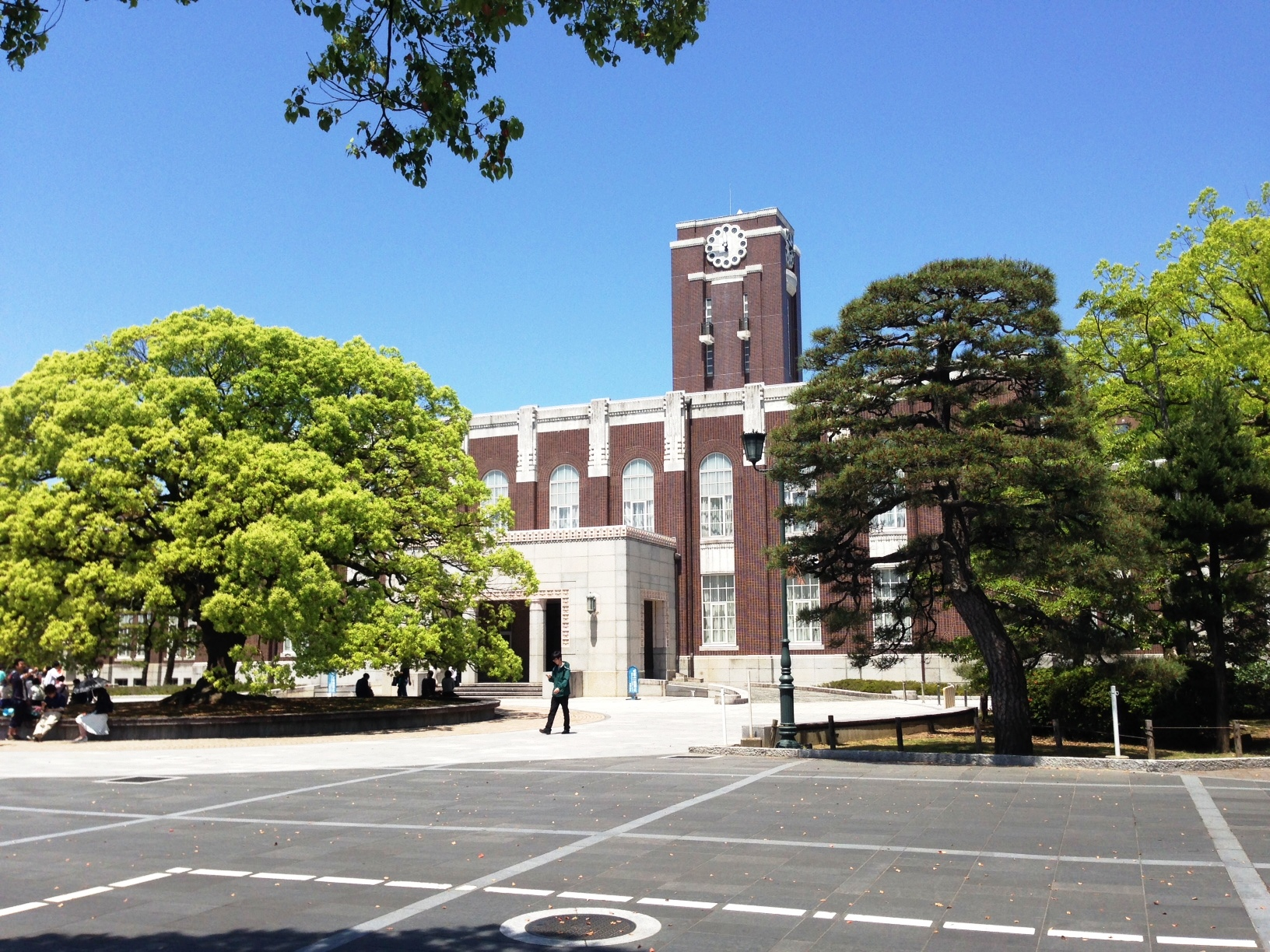
Kyoto University

Home to 40 institutions of higher education, Kyoto is one of the academic centers in Japan. Kyoto University is ranked highly among all universities nationwide, with eight Nobel laureates and two Prime Ministers of Japan among its alumni. The Research Institute for Mathematical Sciences and the Yukawa Institute for Theoretical Physics, both part of the university, have been affiliated with influential mathematicians and physicists. Private universities such as Doshisha University and Ritsumeikan University are also located in the city.

The Consortium of Universities in Kyoto is a Kyoto-based higher education network consisting of three national universities, three public (prefectural and municipal) universities, 45 private universities, five other organizations, and representatives from the city government. The Consortium does not offer degrees, but allows students of member universities to take courses at other member universities.

In addition to Japanese universities and colleges, educational institutions from other countries operate programs in the city. The Kyoto Consortium for Japanese Studies (KCJS) is a group of 14 American universities that runs overseas academic programs in Japanese language and cultural studies for university students. Similarly, the Associated Kyoto Program runs a study-abroad academic program with a focus on cultural, language, and historical learning in and around the Kansai metropolitan area.

=== Primary and secondary education ===
As of 1 May 2023, there were 154 municipal public elementary schools in Kyoto, with a total of 55,736 pupils. At the secondary level, there were 66 municipal public junior high schools with 27,046 students and 11 municipal public senior high schools with 5,117 students. Beyond the public system, the city hosts several private institutions to cater to different international curricula, including the Kyoto International School and the Lycée français international de Kyoto.

== Culture ==
West gate (Sai-mon) on the Kiyomizu-dera temple complex Kyoto

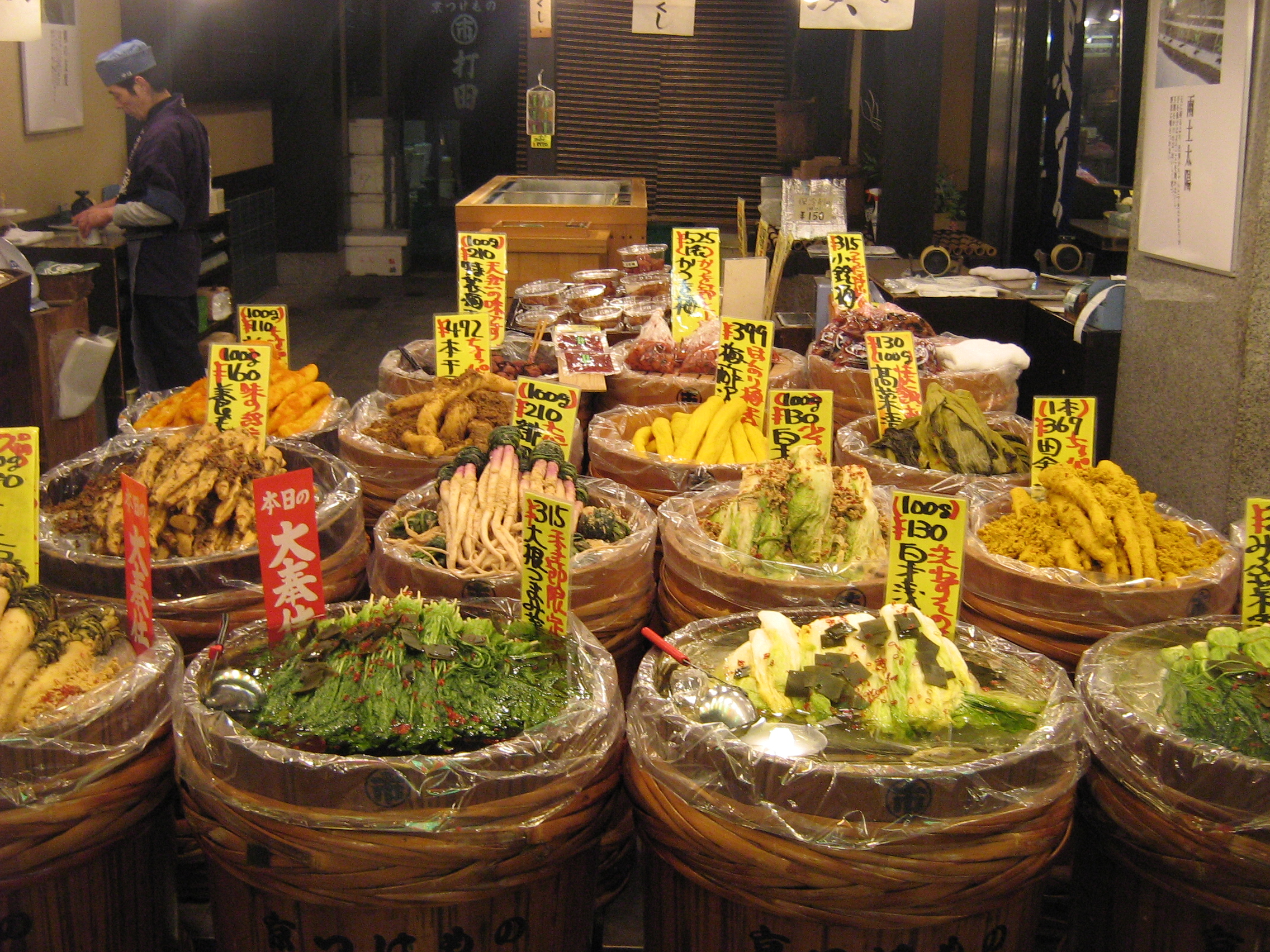
A tsukemono shop on Nishiki Street

Although ravaged by wars, fires, and earthquakes during its eleven centuries as the imperial capital, Kyoto suffered only minor damage in World War II. Kyoto remains Japan's cultural center. About 20% of Japan's National Treasures and 14% of Important Cultural Properties exist in the city proper. The government of Japan relocated the Agency for Cultural Affairs to Kyoto in 2023.

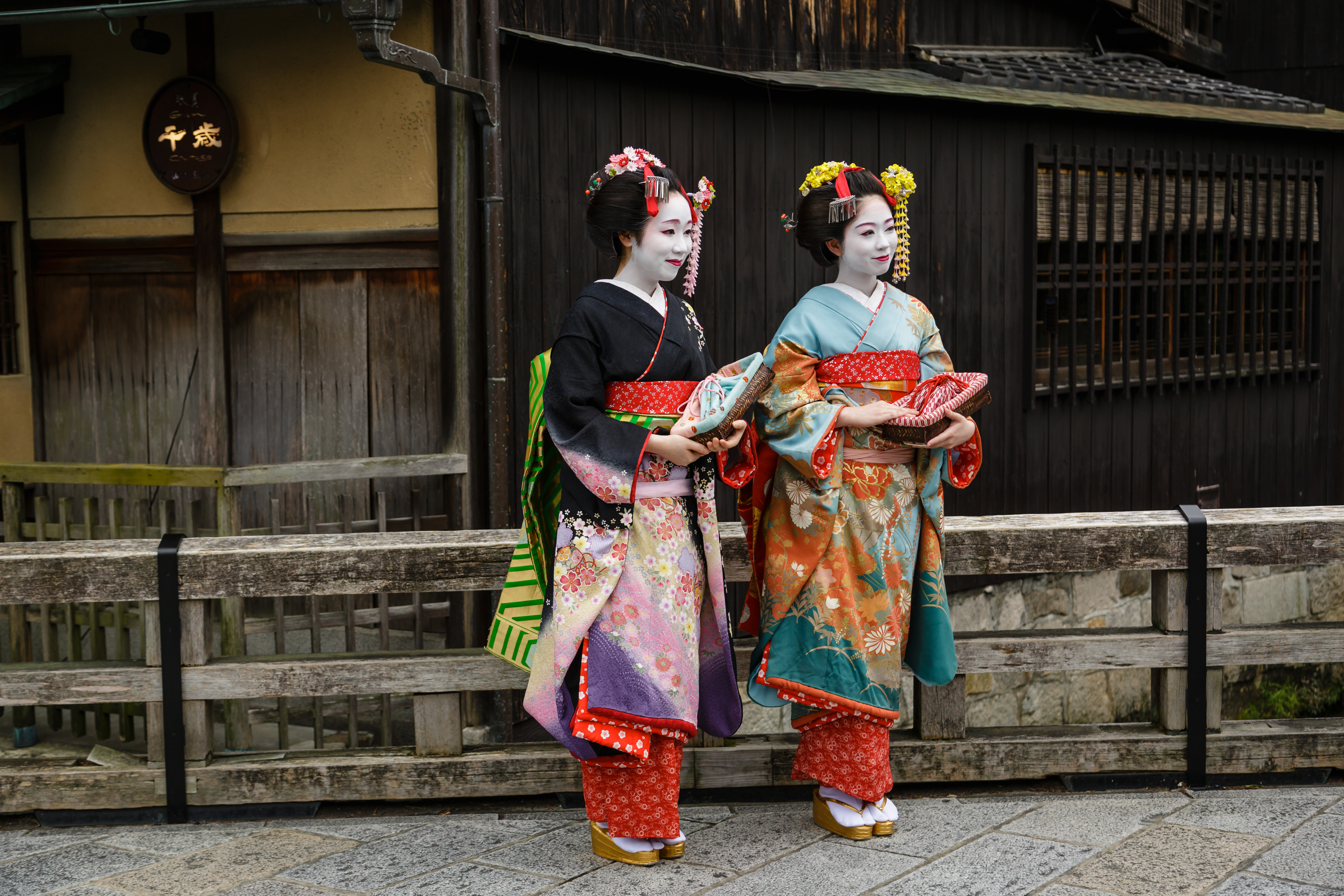
Apprentice geisha in Kyoto

With its 2,000 religious places – 1,600 Buddhist temples and 400 Shinto shrines, as well as palaces, gardens and architecture – intact, it is one of the best preserved cities in Japan. Among the most famous temples in Japan are Kiyomizu-dera, a magnificent wooden temple supported by pillars off the slope of a mountain; Kinkaku-ji, the Temple of the Golden Pavilion; Ginkaku-ji, the Temple of the Silver Pavilion; and Ryōan-ji, famous for its rock garden. The Heian Jingū is a Shinto shrine, built in 1895, celebrating the imperial family and commemorating the first and last emperors to reside in Kyoto. Three special sites have connections to the imperial family: the Kyoto Gyoen area including the Kyoto Imperial Palace and Sentō Imperial Palace, homes of the emperors of Japan for many centuries; Katsura Imperial Villa, one of the nation's finest architectural treasures; and Shugakuin Imperial Villa, one of its best Japanese gardens. In addition, the temple of Sennyu-ji houses the tombs of the emperors from Shijō to Kōmei.

Other sites in Kyoto include Arashiyama, the Gion and Ponto-chō geisha quarters, the Philosopher's Walk, and the canals that line some of the older streets.

The "Historic Monuments of Ancient Kyoto" are listed by the UNESCO as a World Heritage Site. These include the Kamo Shrines (Kami and Shimo), Kyō-ō-Gokokuji (Tō-ji), Kiyomizu-dera, Daigo-ji, Ninna-ji, Saihō-ji (Kokedera), Tenryū-ji, Rokuon-ji (Kinkaku-ji), Jishō-ji (Ginkaku-ji), Ryōan-ji, Hongan-ji, Kōzan-ji, and the Nijō Castle, primarily built by the Tokugawa shōguns. Other sites outside the city are also on the list.

Kyoto is renowned for its abundance of delicious Japanese foods and cuisine. The special circumstances of Kyoto as a city away from the sea and home to many Buddhist temples resulted in the development of a variety of vegetables peculiar to the Kyoto area (京野菜, kyō-yasai). The oldest restaurant in Kyoto is Honke Owariya which was founded in 1465.

Japan's television and film industry has its center in Kyoto. Many jidaigeki, action films featuring samurai, were shot at Toei Uzumasa Eigamura. A film set and theme park in one, Eigamura features replicas of traditional Japanese buildings, which are used for jidaigeki. Among the sets are a replica of the old Nihonbashi (the bridge at the entry to Edo), a traditional courthouse, a Meiji Period police box and part of the former Yoshiwara red-light district. Actual film shooting takes place occasionally, and visitors are welcome to observe the action.

The dialect spoken in Kyoto is known as Kyō-kotoba or Kyōto-ben, a constituent dialect of the Kansai dialect. Until the late Edo period, the Kyoto dialect was the de facto standard Japanese, although it has since been replaced by modern standard Japanese. Traditional Kyoto expressions include the polite copula dosu, the honorific verb ending -haru, and the greeting phrase okoshi-yasu.

=== Museums ===
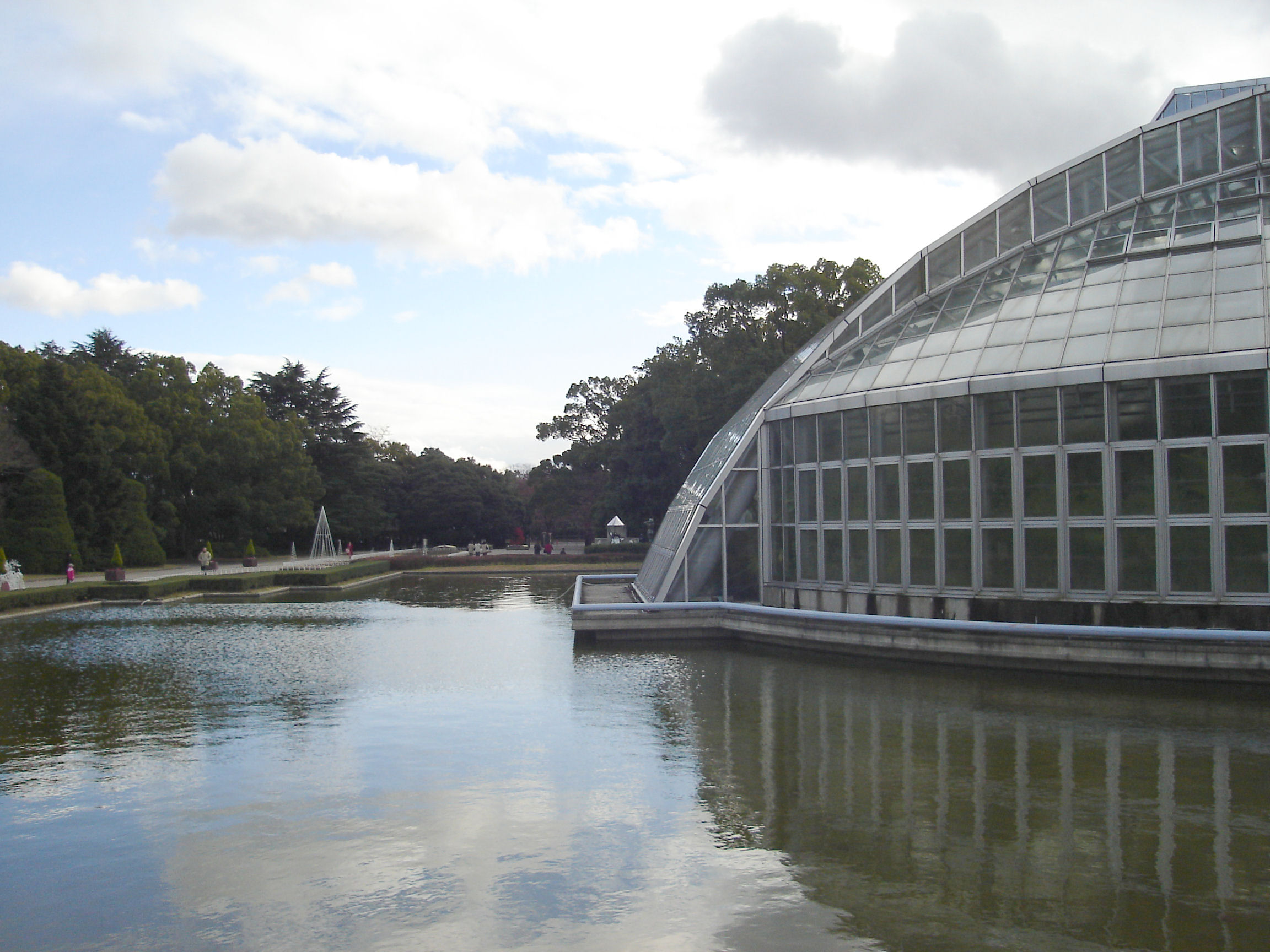
Kyoto Botanical Garden

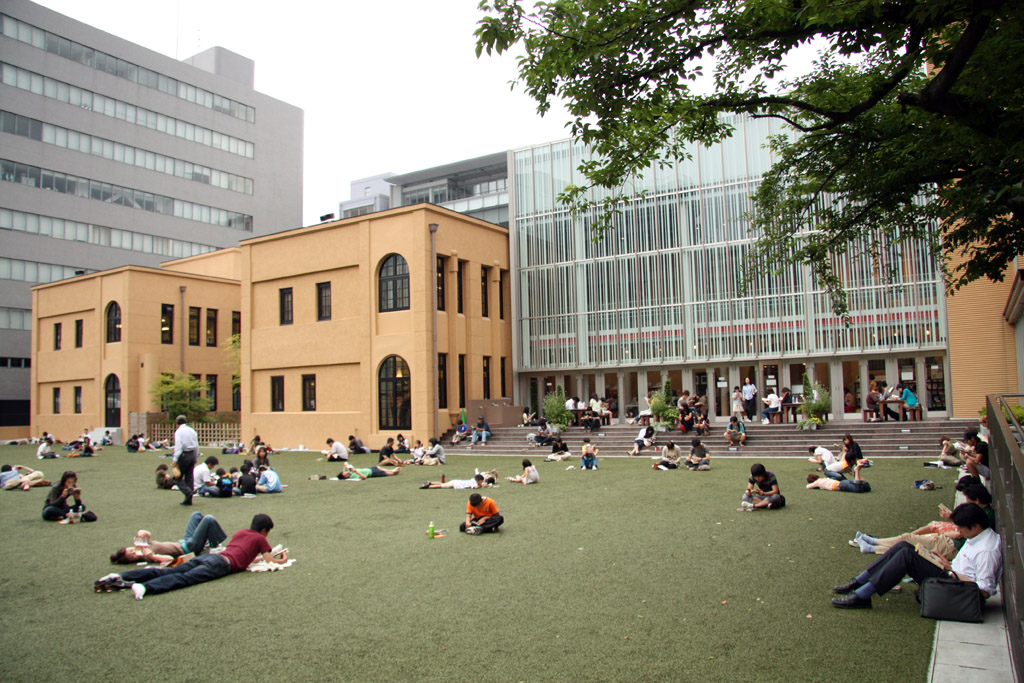
Kyoto International Manga Museum

- Gekkeikan Ōkura Sake Museum (月桂冠大倉記念館)
- Hakusasonso Hashimoto Kansetsu Garden and Museum (白沙村荘 橋本関雪記念館)
- Hosomi Museum (細見美術館)
- Joutenkaku Museum (承天閣美術館)
- Kitamura Museum (北村美術館)
- Koryo Museum of Art (高麗美術館)
- Kyoto Arashiyama Orgel Museum (京都嵐山オルゴール美術館)
- Kyoto Art Center (京都芸術センター)
- Kyoto Botanical Garden (京都府立植物園)
- Kyoto City Archaeological Museum (京都市考古資料館)
- Kyoto City Heiankyo Sosei-Kan Museum (京都市平安京創生館)
- Kyoto International Manga Museum (京都国際マンガミュージアム)
- Kyoto Kaleidoscope Museum (京都万華鏡ミュージアム)
- Kyoto Municipal Museum of Art (京都市美術館)
- Kyoto Museum for World Peace (国際平和ミュージアム)
- Kyoto Museum of Traditional Crafts (京都伝統産業ふれあい館)
- Kyoto National Museum (京都国立博物館)
- Kyoto Prefectural Garden of Fine Arts (京都府立陶板名画の庭)
- Kyoto Prefectural Insho-Domoto Museum of Fine Arts (京都府立堂本印象美術館)
- Kyoto Railway Museum (京都鉄道博物館)
- Kyoto Seishū Netsuke Art Museum (京都清宗根付館)
- Kyoto University Museum (京都大学総合博物館)
- Museum of Kyoto (京都府京都文化博物館)
- Namikawa Cloisonne Museum of Kyoto (並河靖之七宝記念館)
- National Museum of Modern Art, Kyoto (京都国立近代美術館)
- Nomura Art Museum (野村美術館)
- Onishi Seiwemon Museum (大西清右衛門美術館)
- Raku Museum (楽美術館)
- Ryozen Museum of History (幕末維新ミュージアム 霊山歴史館)
- Sen-oku Hakuko Kan (泉屋博古館)
- Shigureden (時雨殿)
- Tin Toy Museum (ブリキのおもちゃ博物館)
- Toei Kyoto Studio Park (東映太秦映画村)
- Yurinkan Museum (藤井斉成会有鄰館)

=== Festivals ===
Kyoto is well known for its traditional festivals which have been held for over 1,000 years and are a major tourist attraction. The first is the Aoi Matsuri on May 15. The Gion Matsuri known as one of the 3 great festivals of Japan, culminating in a massive parade on July 17. Kyoto marks the Bon Festival with the Gozan no Okuribi, lighting fires on mountains to guide the spirits home on August 16. The October 22 Jidai Matsuri, Festival of the Ages, celebrates Kyoto's illustrious past.

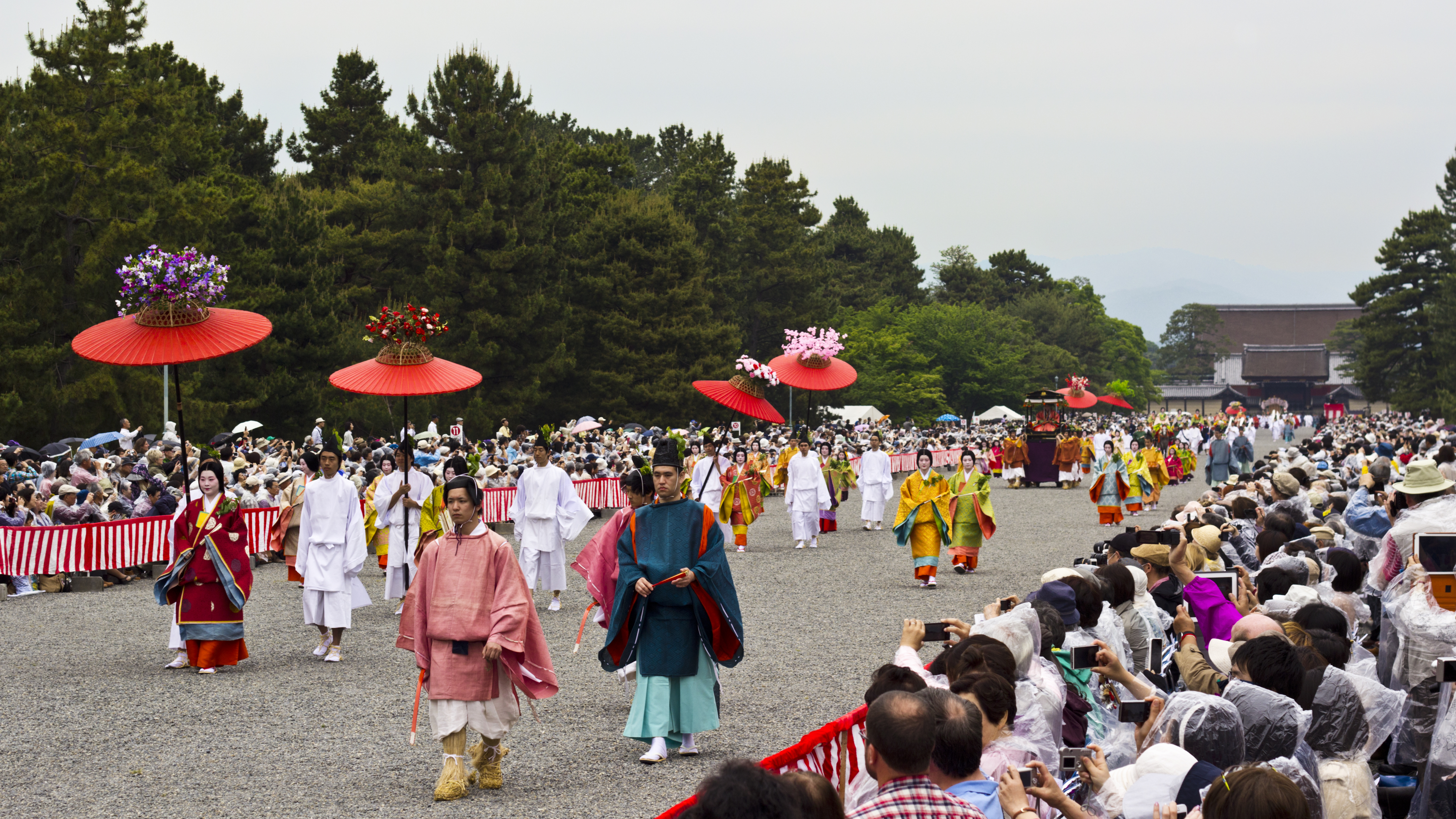
Aoi Matsuri

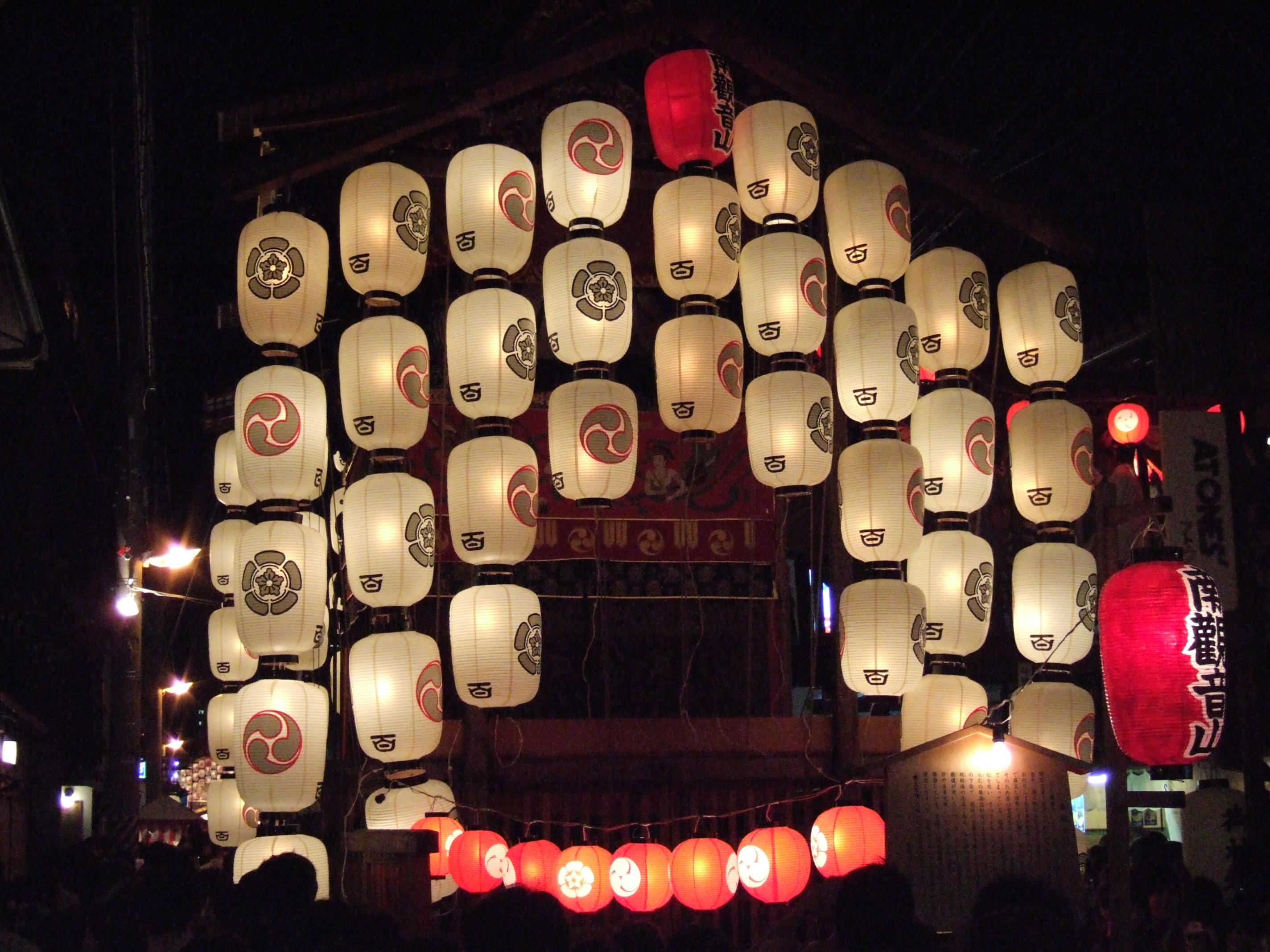
Gion Matsuri

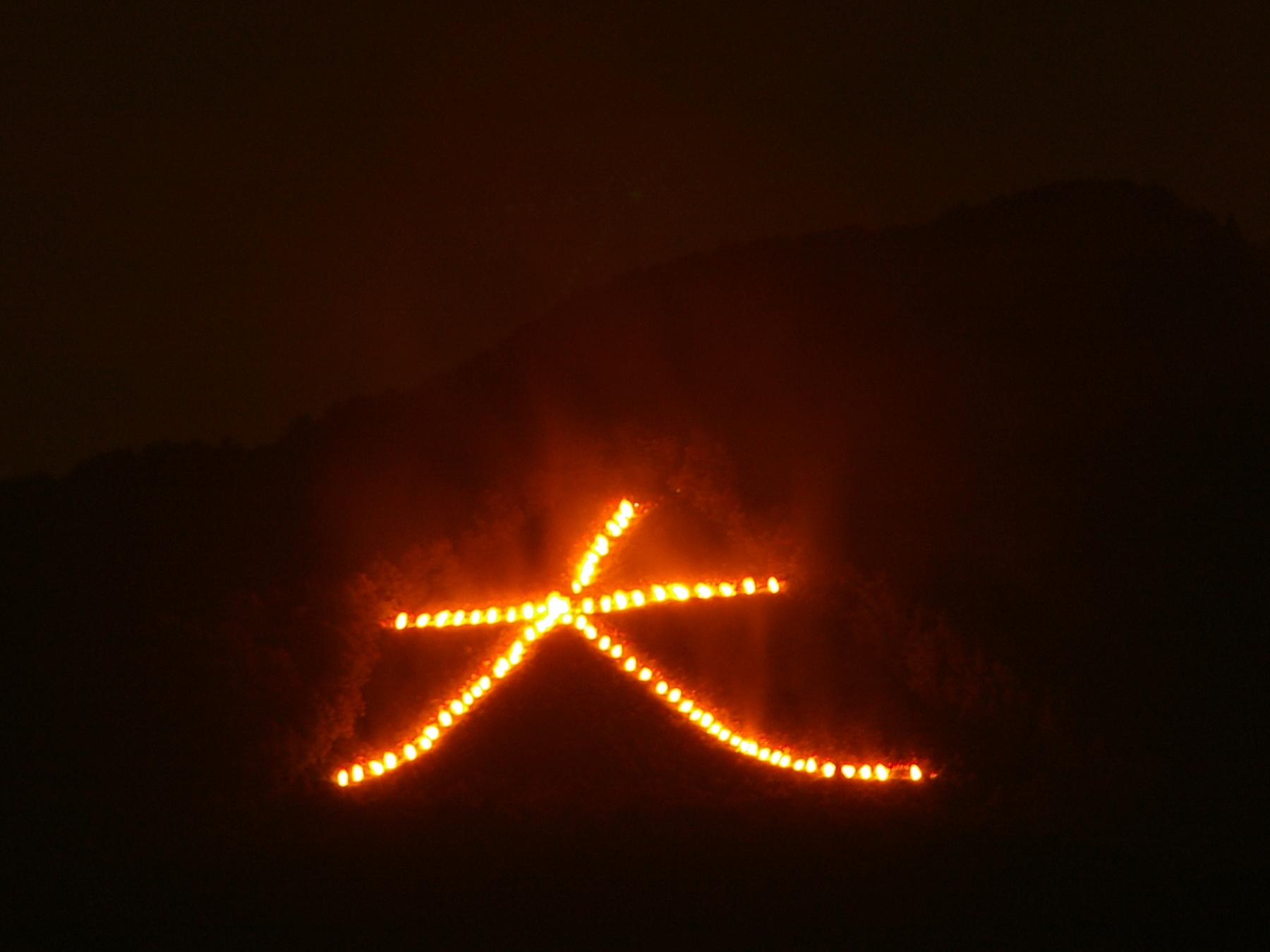
Gozan no Okuribi

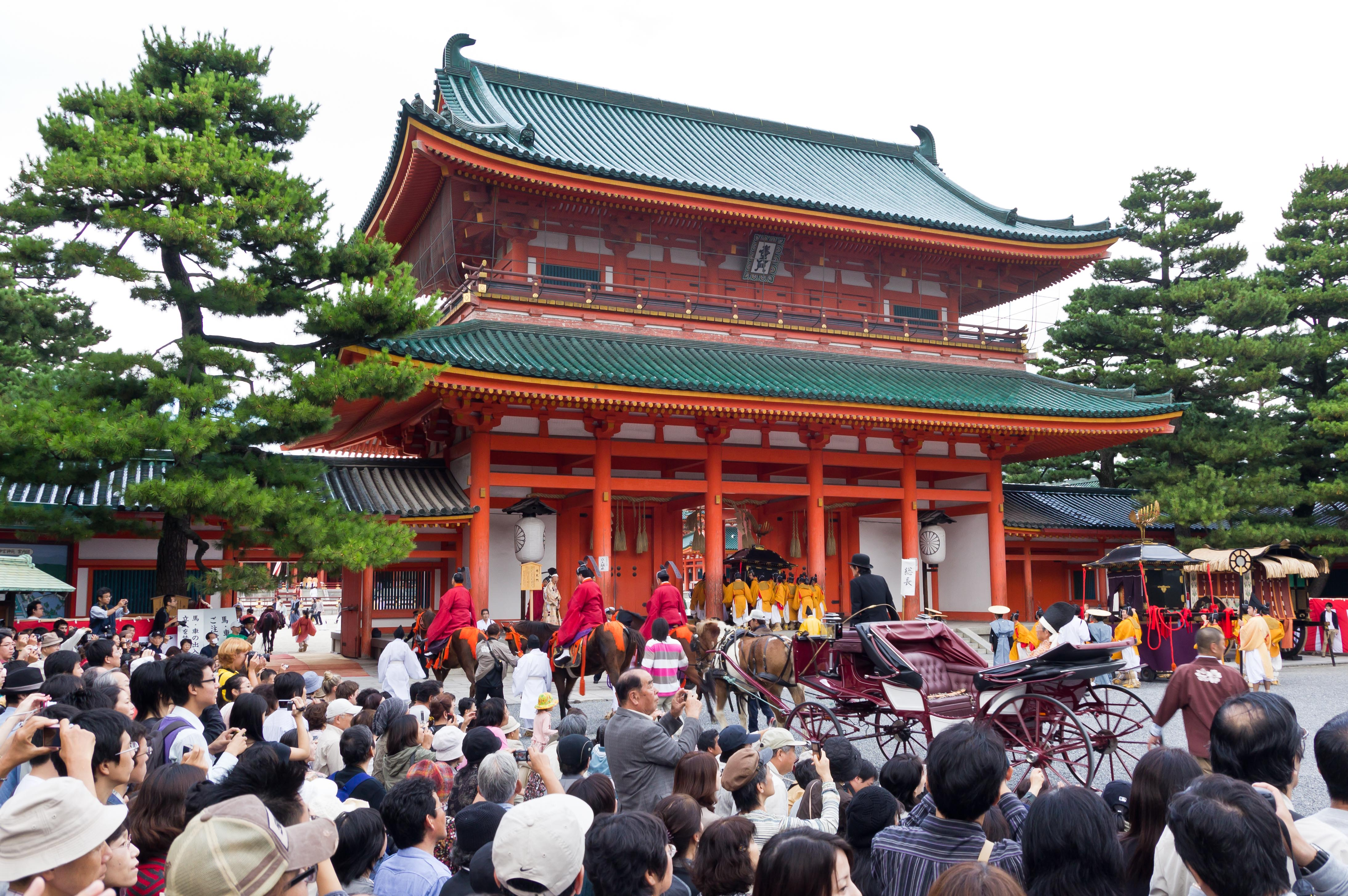
Jidai Matsuri

== Sports ==
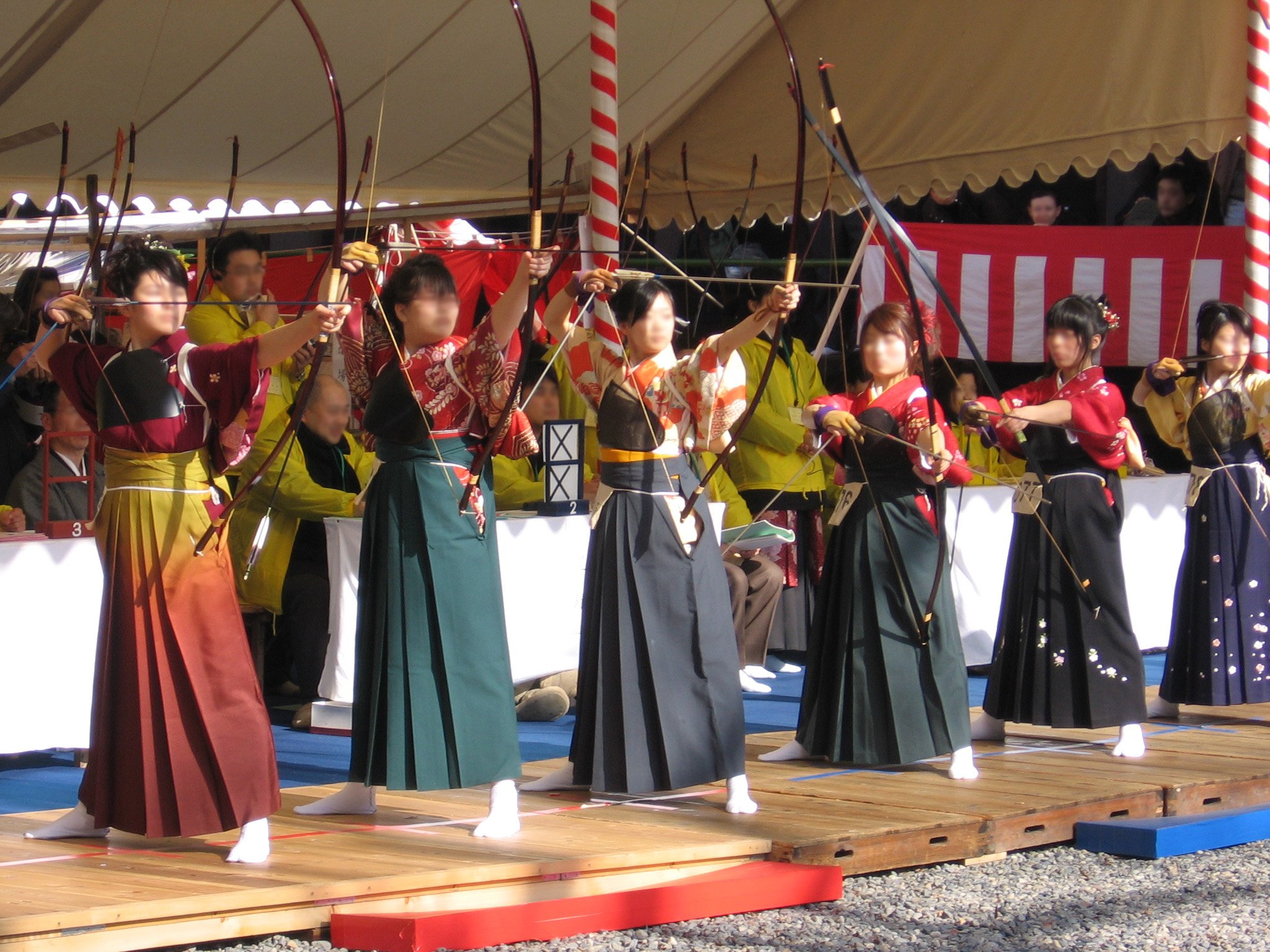
Kyūdō archers participating in the Ōmato Archery Competition at Sanjūsangen-dō

Club	Sport	League	Venue	Established
SGH Galaxy Stars	Softball	JD. League	Wakasa Stadium Kyoto	1986
Kyoto Hannaryz	Basketball	B.League	Hannaryz Arena	2009
Kyoto Kaguyalyze	Table tennis	T.League	Shimadzu Arena Kyoto	2022

Kyoto has been the site of many annual sporting events, ranging from the 400-year-old Tōshiya archery exhibition held at the Sanjūsangen-dō Temple to the Kyoto Marathon and the Shimadzu All Japan Indoor Tennis Championships.

Several sports teams are based in Kyoto, including professional football and basketball teams. In football, Kyoto has been represented by Kyoto Sanga FC, a club which won the Emperor's Cup in 2002 and rose to J. League's Division 1 in 2005. Kyoto Sanga began as an amateur non-company club in the 1920s, making it the J. League team with the longest history, although it was only after professionalization in the 1990s that it was able to compete in the Japanese top division. Until 2019, Kyoto Sanga used Takebishi Stadium Kyoto in Ukyō-ku as its home stadium, but home matches were moved to the city of Kameoka, Kyoto in 2020. There are also several amateur football clubs based in Kyoto. The amateur clubs AS Laranja Kyoto, Ococias Kyoto AC, and Kyoto Shiko Soccer Club compete in the regional Kansai Soccer League.

Another professional team based in Kyoto is the Kyoto Hannaryz, a men's basketball team in the First Division of the B.League that plays its home games at the Kyoto City Gymnasium in Ukyō-ku. Kyoto has also been the home of other professional teams that have subsequently moved or been disbanded. Between 1949 and 1952, the Central League professional baseball team Shochiku Robins played home games at Kinugasa Ballpark in Kita-ku and Nishi-Kyōgoku Baseball Park (now known as Wakasa Stadium) in Ukyō-ku. This team eventually became the Yokohama DeNA BayStars. Kyoto also hosted two teams in the Japan Women's Baseball League before the league folded in 2021.

Company teams in Kyoto include two rugby squads, the Mitsubishi Motors Kyoto Red Evolutions and the Shimadzu Breakers, which compete in the Kansai regional rugby league Top West. In baseball, company teams have competed in the regional JABA Kyoto Tournament annually since 1947.

Kyoto Racecourse in Fushimi-ku is one of ten racecourses operated by the Japan Racing Association. It hosts notable horse races including the Kikuka-shō, Spring Tenno Sho, and Queen Elizabeth II Cup.

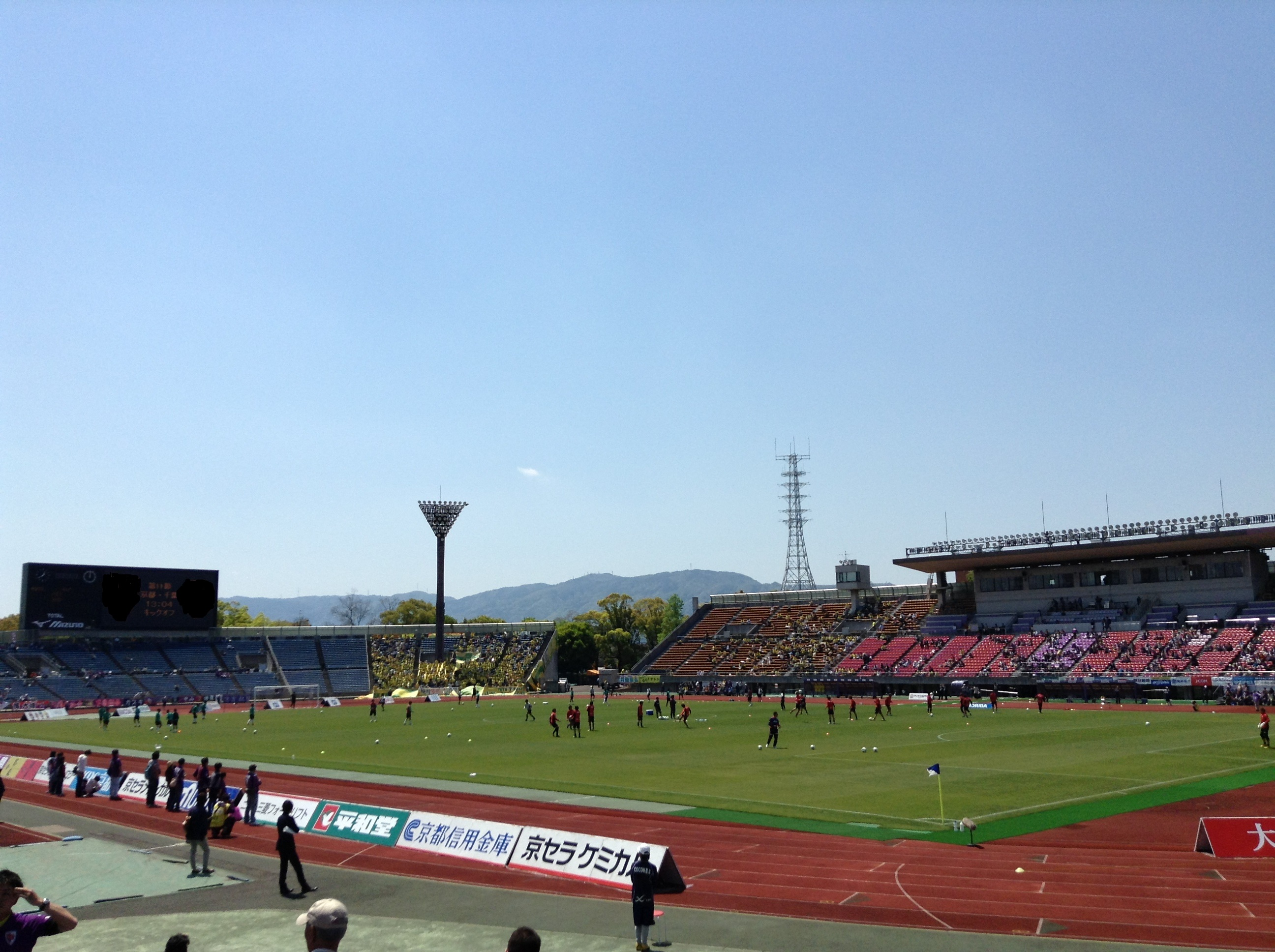
Takebishi Stadium Kyoto

Wakasa Stadium Kyoto

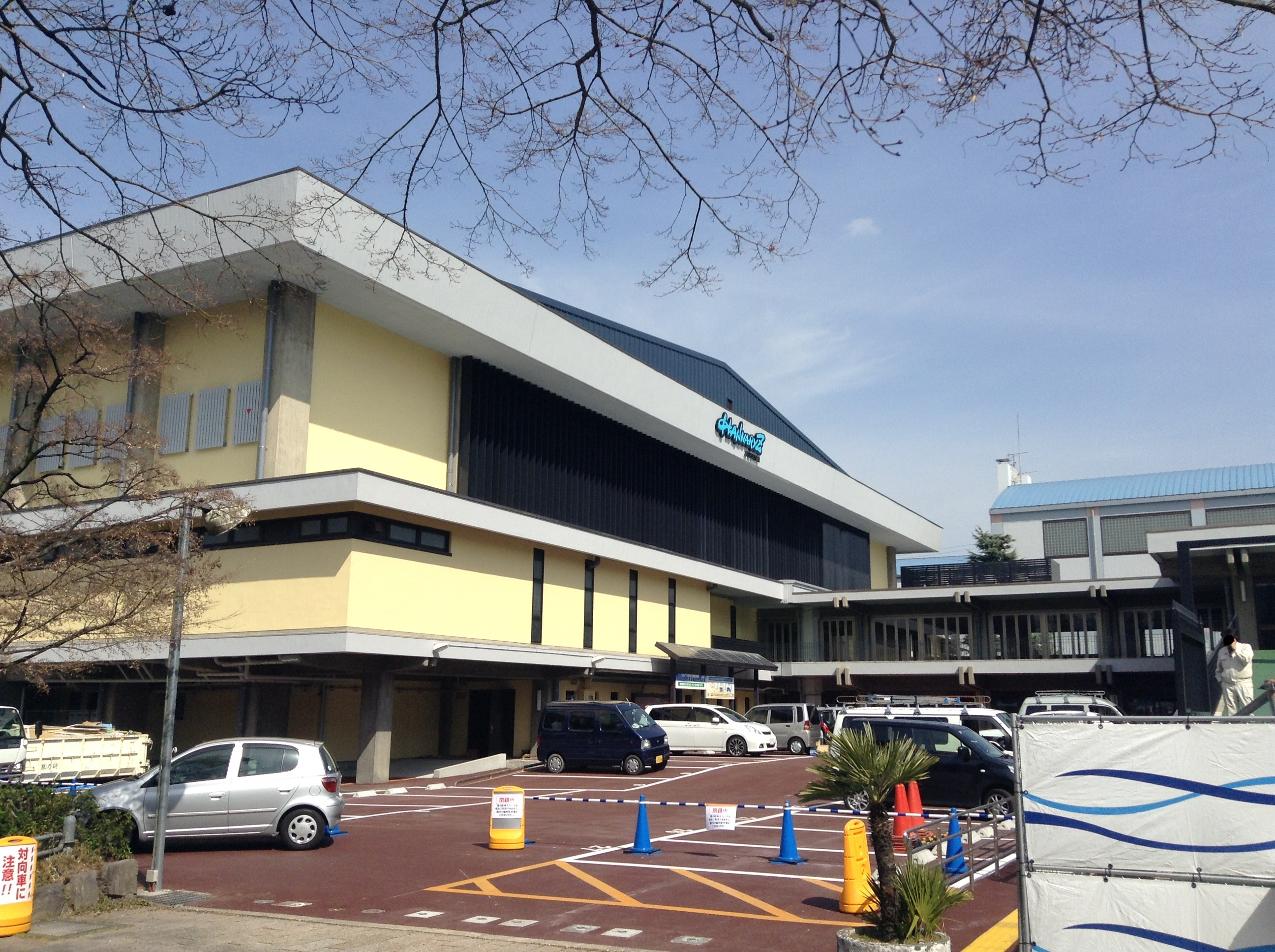
Kyoto City Gymnasium

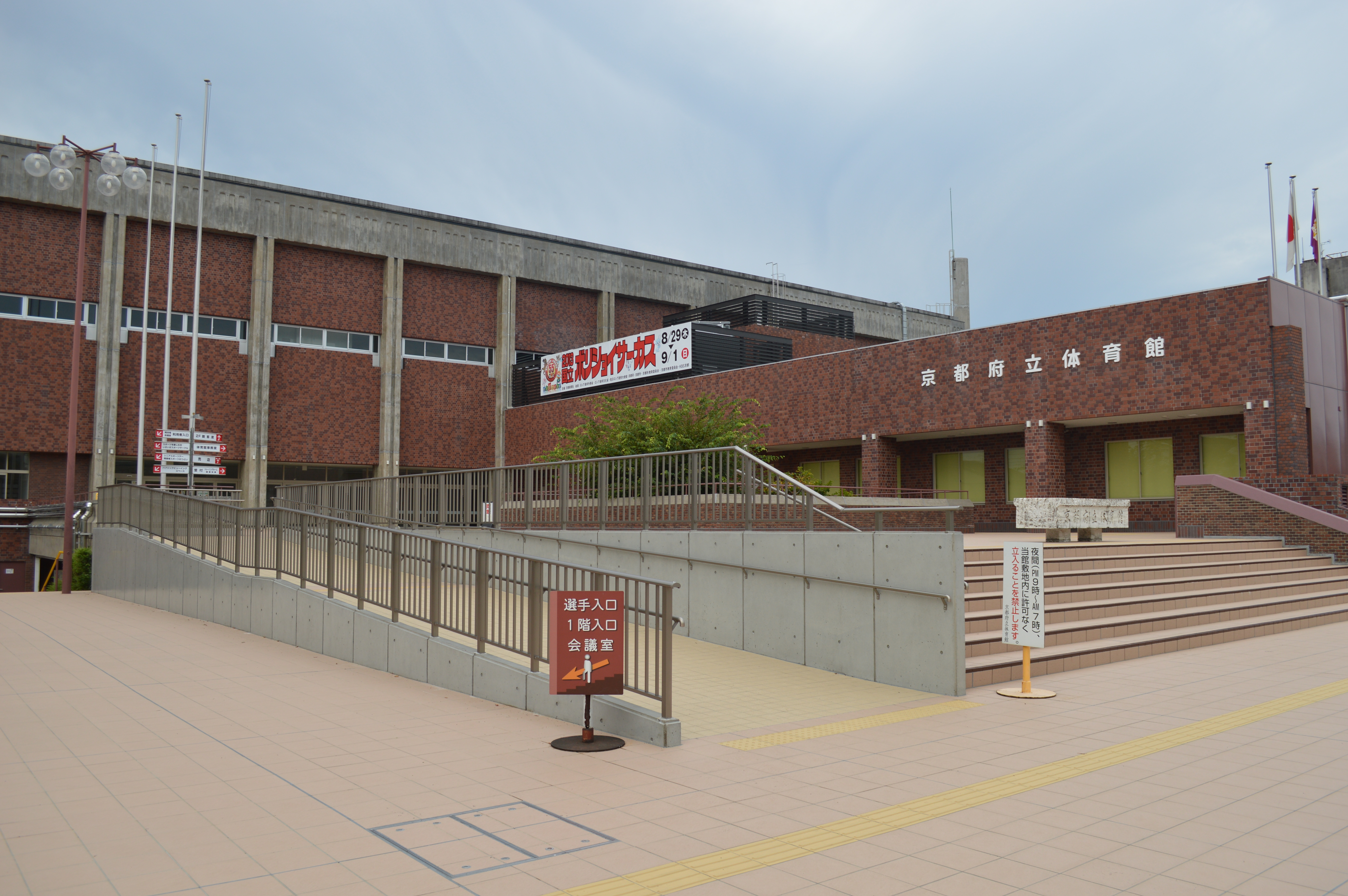
Shimadzu Arena KYOTO

== International relations ==
=== Sister cities ===
The city of Kyoto has sister-city relationships with the following cities:

- Boston, United States (since June 1959)
- Cologne, Germany (since May 1963)
- Florence, Italy (since September 1965)
- Guadalajara, Mexico (since October 1980)
- Kyiv, Ukraine (since September 1971)
- Paris, France (since June 1958)
- Prague, Czech Republic (since April 1996)
- Xi'an, China (since May 1974, friendship city)
- Zagreb, Croatia (since October 1981)

=== Partner cities ===
In addition to its sister city arrangements which involve multi-faceted cooperation, Kyoto has created a system of "partner cities" which focus on cooperation based on a particular topic. At present, Kyoto has partner-city arrangements with the following cities:

- Huế, Vietnam (since February 2013)
- Istanbul, Turkey (since June 2013)
- Jinju, South Korea (since April 1999)
- Konya, Turkey (since December 2009)
- Qingdao, China (since August 2012)
- Vientiane, Laos (since November 2015)

== See also ==
- List of bridges in Kyoto
- List of Buddhist temples in Kyoto
- List of fires in Kyoto
- List of Shinto shrines in Kyoto
- Outline of Kyoto
