= 嵐山 =

嵐山 or 岚山 may refer to:

- Arashiyama (disambiguation)
  - Arashiyama, Kyoto, Japan
- Lanshan (disambiguation)
  - Lanshan, Rizhao, Shandong, China

== See also ==
- The dictionary definition of 嵐 at Wiktionary
- The dictionary definition of 岚 at Wiktionary
- The dictionary definition of 山 at Wiktionary
