= Tsukiyomi Shrine (Kyoto) =

Shinto Shrine in Nishikyo Ward, Kyoto

- 月読神社
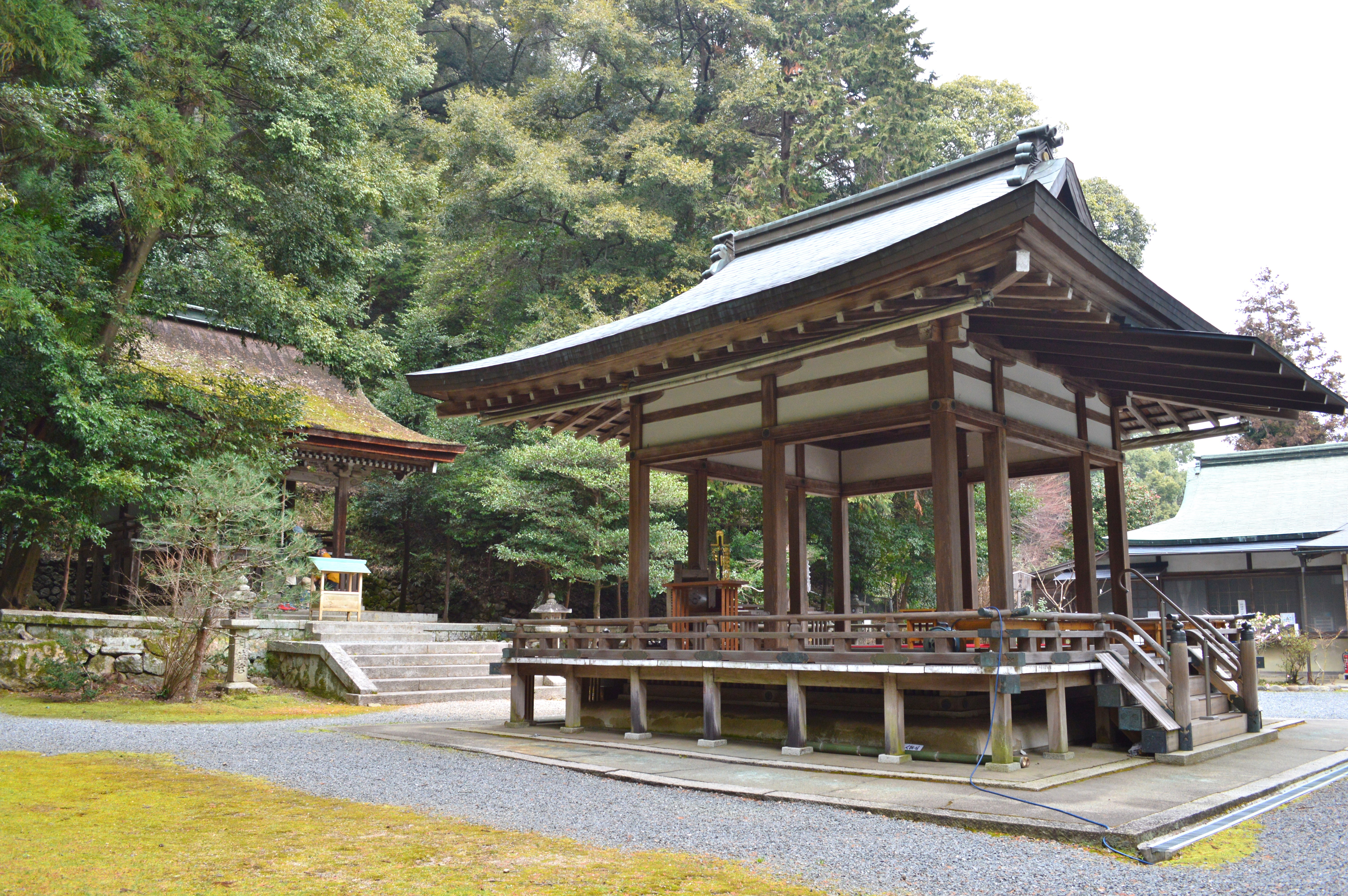
- Worship hall (front) and the main hall (back left)

- Location within Kyoto city Location within Kyoto Prefecture Location within Japan

Religion
- Affiliation: Shintoism
- Deity: Tsukuyomi-no-Mikoto
- Festival: October 3

Location
- Location: 15 Yamazoe-cho, Matsumuro, Nishikyo Ward, Kyoto City, Kyoto Prefecture
- Coordinates: 34°59′48″N 135°41′10″E

Architecture
- Style: streamlined roof style
- Established: 487, 3rd year of Emperor Kenzō

Tsukiyomi Shrine (月読神社, Tsukiyomi jinja) is a Shinto shrine located in Nishikyō Ward, Kyoto, Japan. It was named as a Myōjin Taisha (名神大社, lit "Great shrine for notable god") in the ancient Japanese religious book Engishiki. Tsukiyomi Shrine is one of the "Matsuo Seven Shrines" (松尾七社), and a subsidiary shrine of Matsunoo Taisha 400 meters to the north. Its annual festival is on October 3.

== Enshrined deity ==
While it is known that the shrine hosts a moon god named Tsukiyomi, due to the scarce documentations, the exact identity of the god is unclear. It is believed to be one of the following deities:

=== Tsukuyomi-no-Mikoto ===
Tsukuyomi-no-Mikoto (月読命), the moon god in traditional Japanese mythology, is generally known as the brother of the sun god Amaterasu (天照大御神), as noted in both Kojiki and Nihon Shoki. However, the legend passed down in Tsukiyomi Shrine is different from the version found in Kojiki. According to Nihon Shoki, which recorded the shrine's founding in the February article of the 3rd year of Emperor Kenzō, "Tsukigami", the decedent of Takamimusubi (高御産巣日神), is said to have been enshrined by the Iki no Agatanushi (壱岐県主, lit. "Lord of the Iki Prefecture"). In addition, in Sendai Kuji Hongi (先代旧事本紀), the deity appeared to be the ancestor of Iki Prefecture with the divine name of "Amagetsu no Mikoto" (天月神命). From these, it is presumed that the deity enshrined at Tsukiyomi is the moon god who also governs the tides of the sea, and is enshrined by the Iki clan. There is also a theory that Tsukiyomi has another divine aspect as the god of Kiboku (亀卜, lit. "Turtle oracle"), due to the fact that Iki clan is a major producer of Urabe (卜部), which is the turtle shells used in fortune-telling.

Moreover, in the April article of the 3rd year of Emperor Kenzo of Nihon Shoki, there is a description of "Sun God" enshrined in Tsukiyomi by Kenchoku Tsushima, but it originated from a deity distinct from Amaterasu. In the same article, it is recorded that this sun god, like the god of the moon, is the decedent of Takamimusubi.

=== The moon god of Yamashiro Province ===
Around the Katsura River, there are a wide range of shrines or ruins that were dedicated to the moon god. In the Kizu River basin in Tsuzuki District, which joins the Katsura River, you can find Kabaitsuki Shrine (樺井月神社) and another Tsukiyomi Shrine, both of which are presumed to be related to the Hayato people of southern Kyushu. There was also the Ogawatsuki Shrine (小川月神社) in Kuwata District, Tanba Province, which is adjacent to Kadono District through the Hozu River. In an excerpt from Yamashiro Fudoki, there is a myth about the origin of the place name "Kari" (桂里), and it indicated that the moon god was being revered in the region. Since "Kari" did not appear in Wamyō Ruijushō, a 10th century Japanese dictionary, it is highly likely that the origin myth was a later addition to Yamashiro Fudoki.

The idea of connecting the moon and the character "桂" already existed in ancient China, and the same connection was adopted in ancient Japan. It is thought that due to prosperity of strong Tsukigami worship based on the several shrines mentioned above, the written form of the name Katsura was changed from the previous "葛" or "楓" to the character of "桂". Based on the number of shrines dedicated to the moon god, and the deity's popularity within the region, its worship was able to go beyond the surrounding mountains and eventually reached Kyoto.

== History ==
=== Founding ===
According to Nihon Shoki, in the 3rd year of the reign of Emperor Kenzo (The 23rd Emperor of Japan), Ahenomikotoshiro (阿閉臣事代), a messenger to Mimana (任那へ), received an oracle from the god of the moon, demanding the construction of a new shrine dedicated to him. The Imperial Court chose to offer the land of "Utaarasuda" (歌荒樔田) in Kadono County of Yamashiro Province to the moon god, and it is said that Oshimi Sukune (押見宿禰), the founder of Iki Prefecture, had performed service in the shrine. It is generally believed that the article above refers to the founding of the Tsukiyomi Shrine. This Shrine here was originally a branch of another Tsukiyomi Shrine in Iki Province. Later, according to Nihon Montoku Tennō Jitsuroku, Tsukiyomi Shrine was relocated to "Matsuo no Minamiyama" (松尾之南山) in 856 to avoid the danger of flooding, and has been enshrined there since. In addition, according to an excerpt from Yamashiro Fudoki, when Tsukuyomi no Mikoto visited Ukemochi no Kami, there was a Katsura in the area. It is said that he was possessed by a tree, and the name "Katsura" originated from this tale.

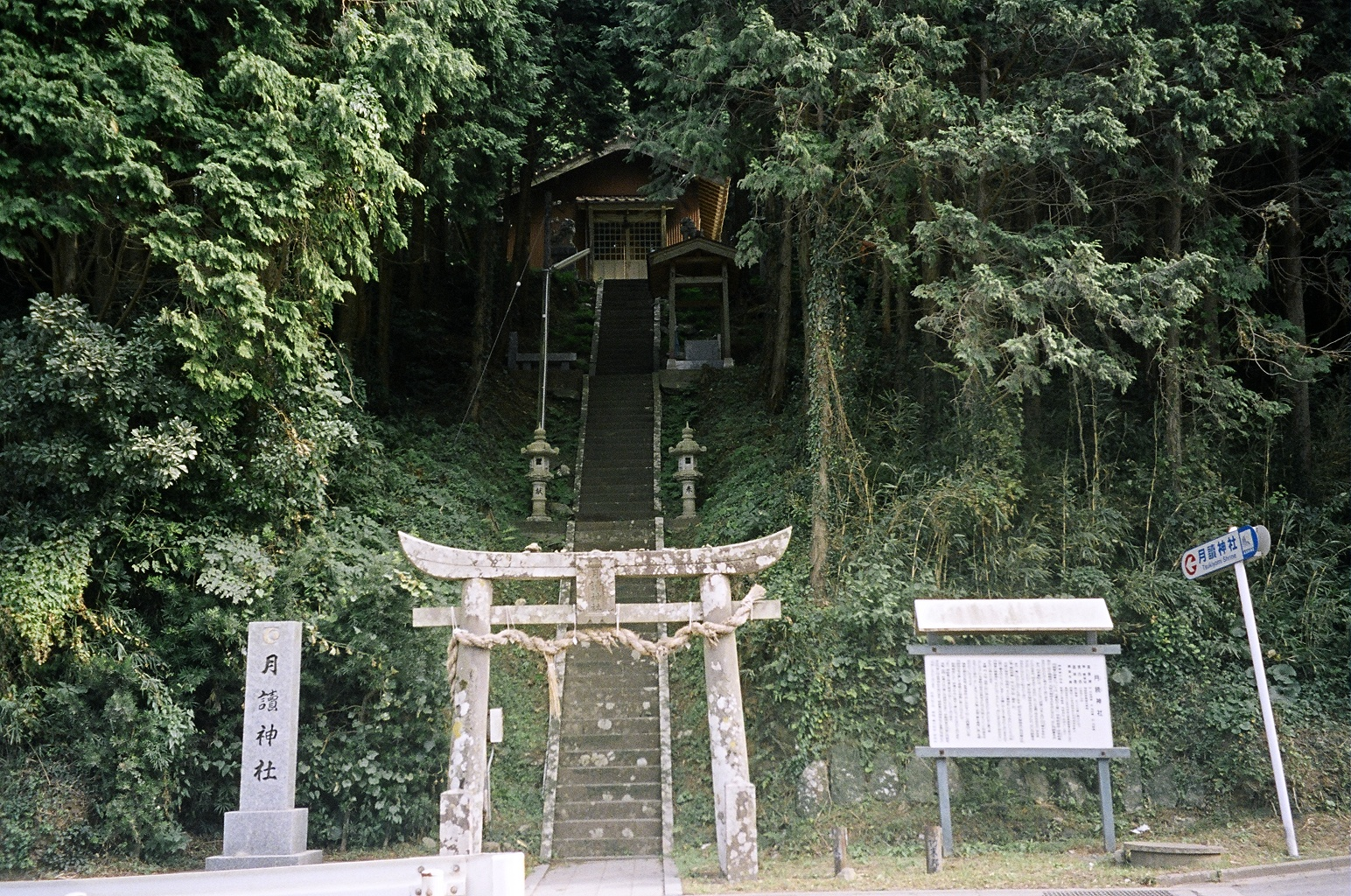
Ronsha of the original Tsukiyomi Shrine, located in Iki, Nagasaki.

As mentioned above, the article in the 3rd year of Emperor Kenzo's reign is considered to have been passed down by the Iki clan, and it is said to be a bunrei (分霊, lit. "Dividing spirit") of the Tsukiyomi Shrine on Iki island, the homeland of the Iki clan. It is said that the importance of Tsushima and Iki in the relationship between the central government and the Korean Peninsula was the reason why the request for a new shrine was granted. Considering the period when the clans of Iki and Tsushima begame involved in central rituals such as Urabe (卜部, lit. "oracle"), it is speculated that Tsukiyomi Shrine was actually founded in the middle to later half of the 6th century.

Regarding the location of the original enshrined place "Utaarasuda", the shrine's chronicle, Tsukiyomi Daijingu Denki (月読大神宮伝記) proposed two siites: Ueno (上野), where Tsukiyomizuka (月読塚) is located; and Kari (桂里). There are also a number of sites proposed by other theories, such as Utamura (宇太村), where the later Heiankyo was constructed; and the Arisugawa basin (有栖川). Among them, Ueno is considered to be the most likely, because its location along a riverside matches the description of Nihon Montoku Tennō Jitsuroku.

=== Brief history ===
In the year 701 (Taihō 1), the rice sacrificed for Tsukiyomi no Kami (月読神), along with those of other deities in Kadono-gun (葛野郡), were given to the Nakatomi clan. Afterward, as mentioned above, in 856 the moon god's shrine was relocated to the foot of Mt. Matsuo, and in 859 (Ten'an 3), Tsukiyomi no Kami was given the rank of Shonii (正二, lit. "Senior Second").

In the Engishiki Jinmyocho, which was written in 927, Tsukiyomi Shrine was recorded as "Kazuno Zatsukiyomi Shrine (葛野坐月読神社), Meishindai (名神大), Tsukinagi Niiname (月次新嘗)" in Kadono County, Yamashiro Province. It was listed as a Myōjin Taisha, with the designation to offer Heihaku (幣帛, sacrificial gift) during the Tsukinari Festival (月次祭) and Niiname-no-Matsuri (新嘗祭). The Jinmyocho also mentioned Ogawatsuki-Jinja in Kuwata County, Tanba Province, which reflected the spread of Tsukigami worship in the Oigawa River basin.

In the Middle Ages, the area was surrounded by fields called "Negida" (禰宜田), and with the authority of a Matsuo Taisha, the shrine was able to obtain the ownership for some of the Negida. The shrine's ownership of these territories were legally recognized by the central government, even after Oda Nobunaga entered Kyoto in 1568.

In the early modern period, the shrine was completely subordinated to Matsuo Taisha Shrine, and out of the 1,000 koku of offerings to the gods of Matsuo-Jinja, 100 koku for Tsukiyomi Negi and 16 koku for Tsukiyomi Iwai were allocated as shrine property.

Following the Meiji Restoration, on March 27, 1877, the shrine was officially established as a subsidiary company of Matsuo Taisha, and the status has remained so to this day.

=== Priesthood ===
Tsukiyomi Shrine is managed by the Matsumuro clan (松室氏). The Matsumuro clan is said to have originated from Oshimi Sukune, as recorded in the 3rd year articles of Emperor Kenzo in Nihon Shoki. Matsumuro is also said to be a descendant of the Iki clan. Regarding the Iki clan, the ancient genealogical record Shinsen Shōjiroku described them as "the descendant of Ikatuomi (雷大臣), (who was in turn) the 9th generation grandson of Ame-no-Koyane (天児屋命)". Interestingly, this description matched the lineage of the Nakatomi clan, whom were also recorded as the descendant of Ame-no-Koyane. It is believed that when Iki clan were enshrined in the Imperial Court as oracles, they were led by the Nakatomi clan, thus receiving a similar lineage. This kind of a close relationship with the Nakatomi clan can also be seen in the article in which the shrine land was given to the Nakatomi clan in the year 701 (Taihō 1). According to the genealogy of Matsunoo Taisha and Tsukiyomi Shrine, the family of Tsukiyomi Shrine was featured on the maternal side of Matsuo Taisha family (Hata clan) during the Genpei (源平) period.

The "Matsumuro" name can be seen in old documents from the Muromachi (室町) period. Since then, they were referred to as "Matsumuro clan".

== Interior ==
The shrine is said to be located at the current site since the year 856. It is believed that the families involved with the shrine, especially the Hata clan, migrated to Kyoto along with it. The precincts of the shrine are designated as a historic site by the Kyoto City Government, as the shrine is important in examining the rituals and culture of immigrants in ancient Kyoto. In addition, according to the "Map of Matsuo Shrine precincts" from the Muromachi period, the shrine once had a main hall, worship hall, as well as a palace, government office, lecture hall, and sacrificial hall. The details of the old shrine were as follows:

- Main hall: Built in Nagare-zukuri style, with cypress bark roofing；
- Worship hall: Built in EIrimoya-zukuri style, with copper-plated roofing;
- Onmyoji (陰陽石) for wishing;
- Tsuki-no-Beishi (月延石), also known as "Safe Delivery Stone" (安産石), which is believed to be from the god of child birth (安産の神). According to the legend of "Yoshufushi" (雍州府志), the stone was originally located in Tsukushi Province. When Empress Jingū gave birth to Emperor Ojin in the year 201, she rubbed her belly with this stone to ensure a safe delivery. Later during the reign of Emperor Jomei, it was dedicated to Tsukiyomi Shrine.
- Shrine Office
- Shrine Gate
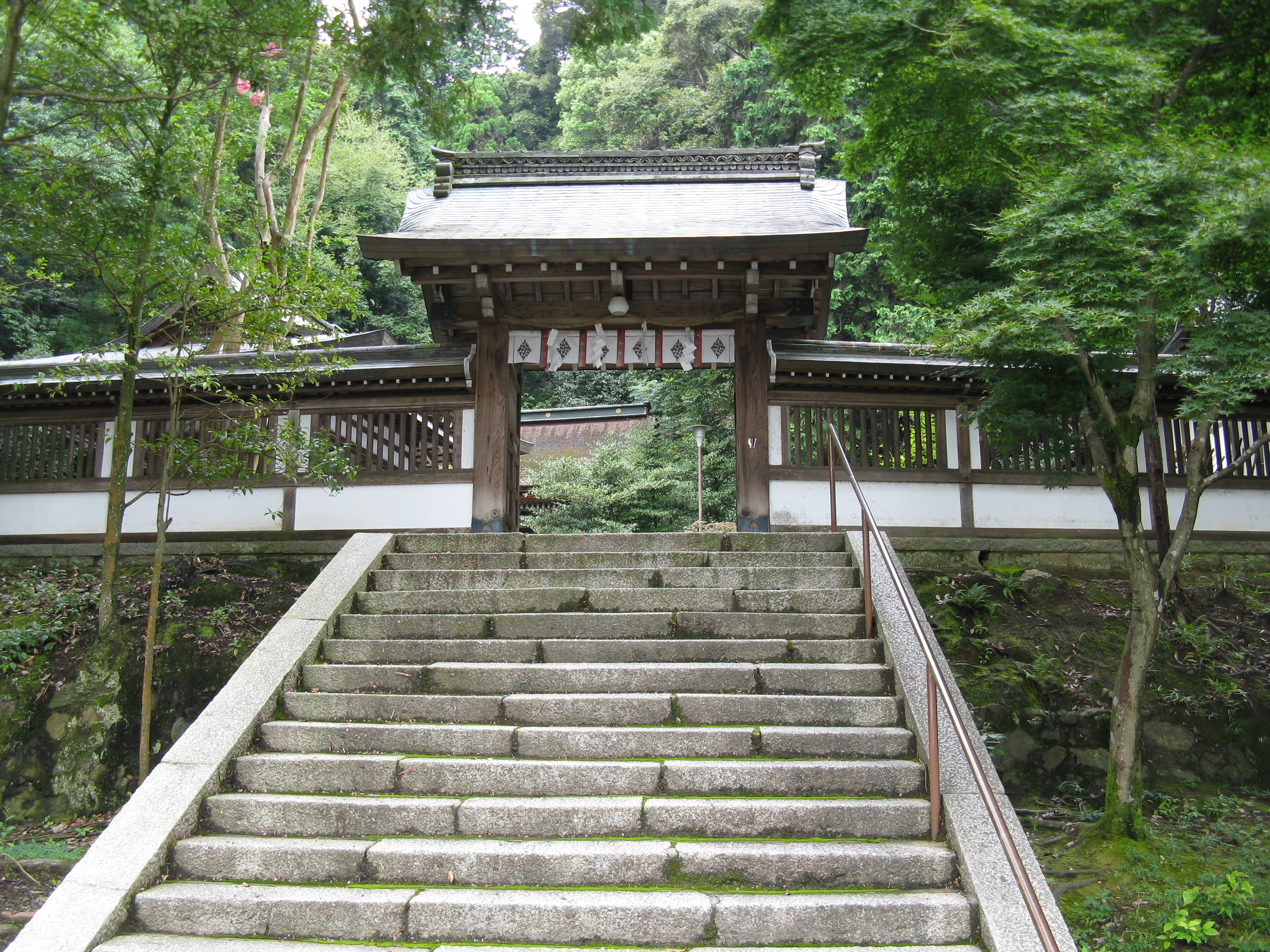
Shrine Gate

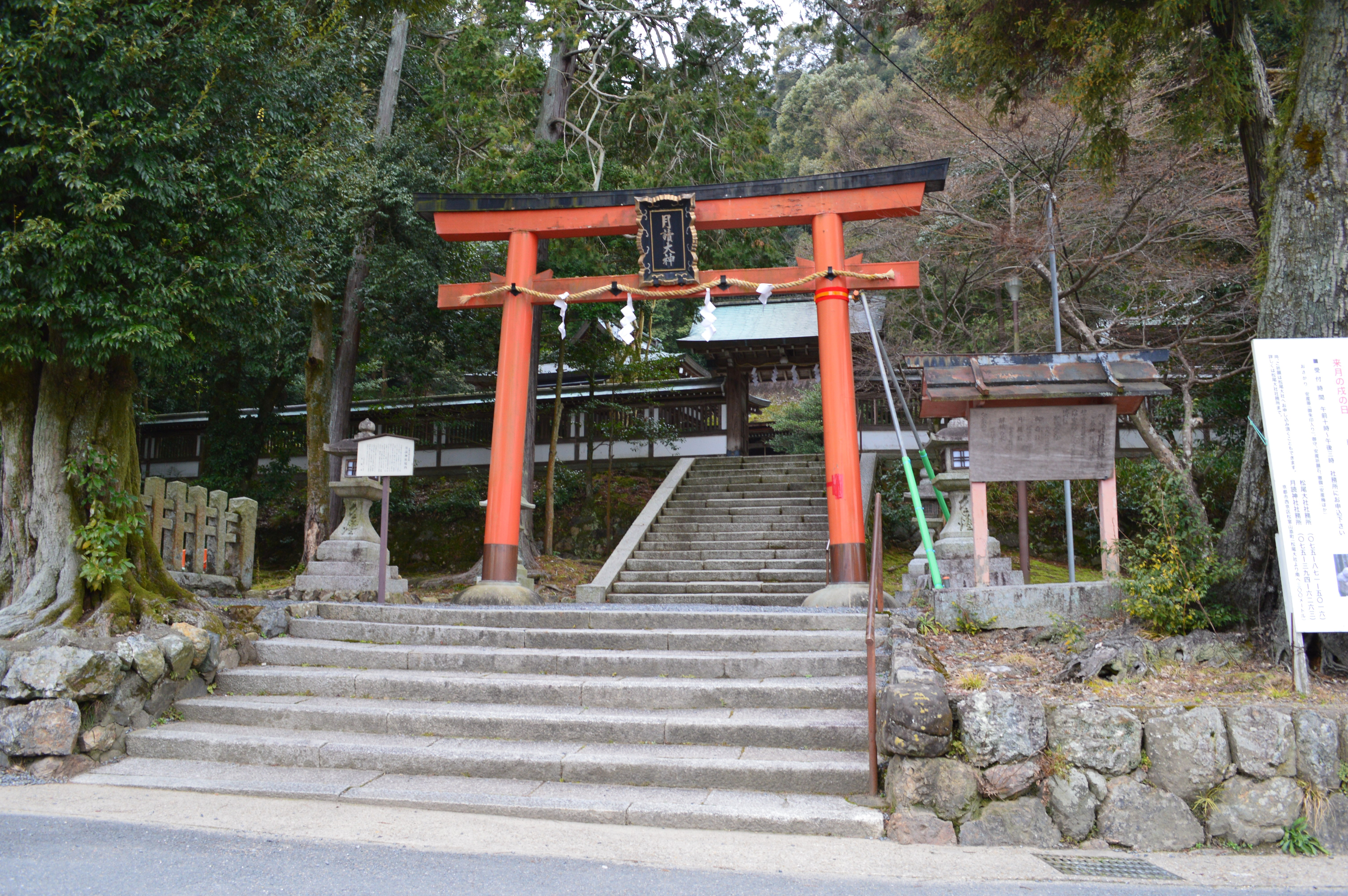
Torii of Tsukiyomi Shrine

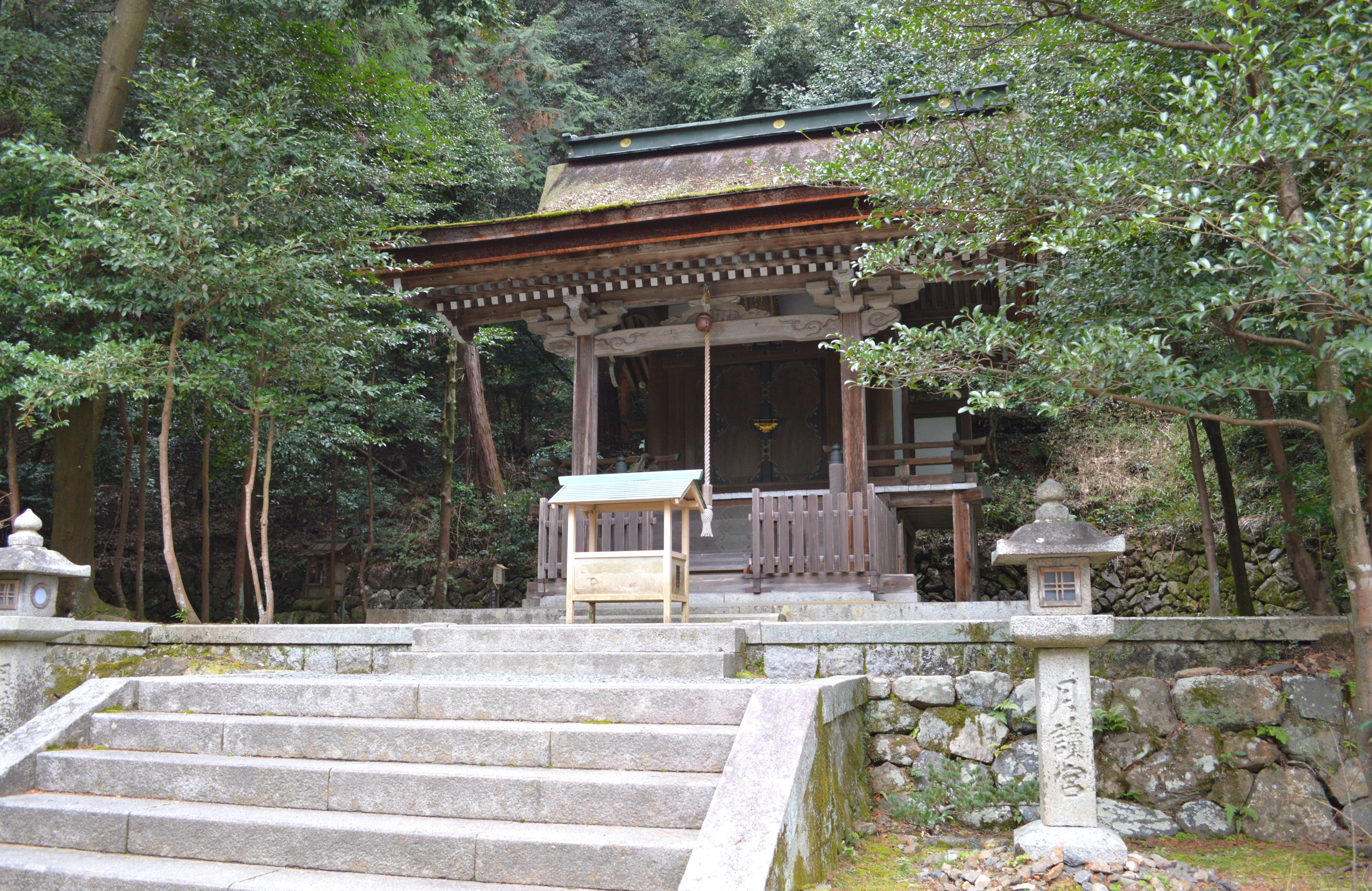
Main Hall

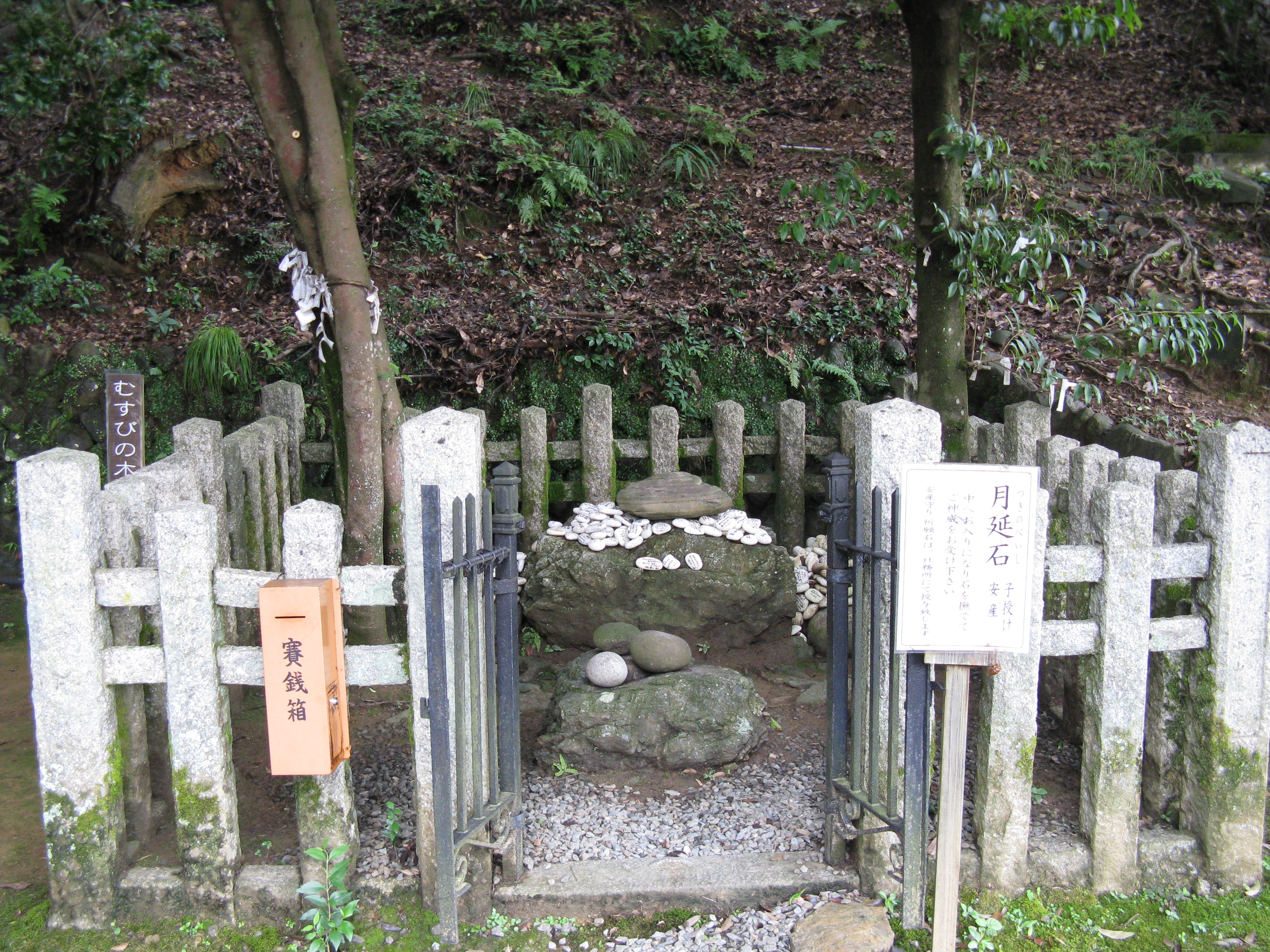
Tsuki-no-Beishi

== Auxiliary Shrines ==
- Mifune Shrine (御船社), which is dedicated to Amatorifune-no-Mikoto (天鳥舟命). It also belongs to Matsuoo Taisha's subordinate Shrine. During the Matsunoo Taisha Shinko Festival, a ceremony to pray for safe passage is held at the Mifune Shrine.
- Shotoku Taishi Shrine, which is dedicated to Prince Shōtoku. It is said that during the prince's lifetime he revered Tsukiyomi, thus his spirit is enshrined here after his death.
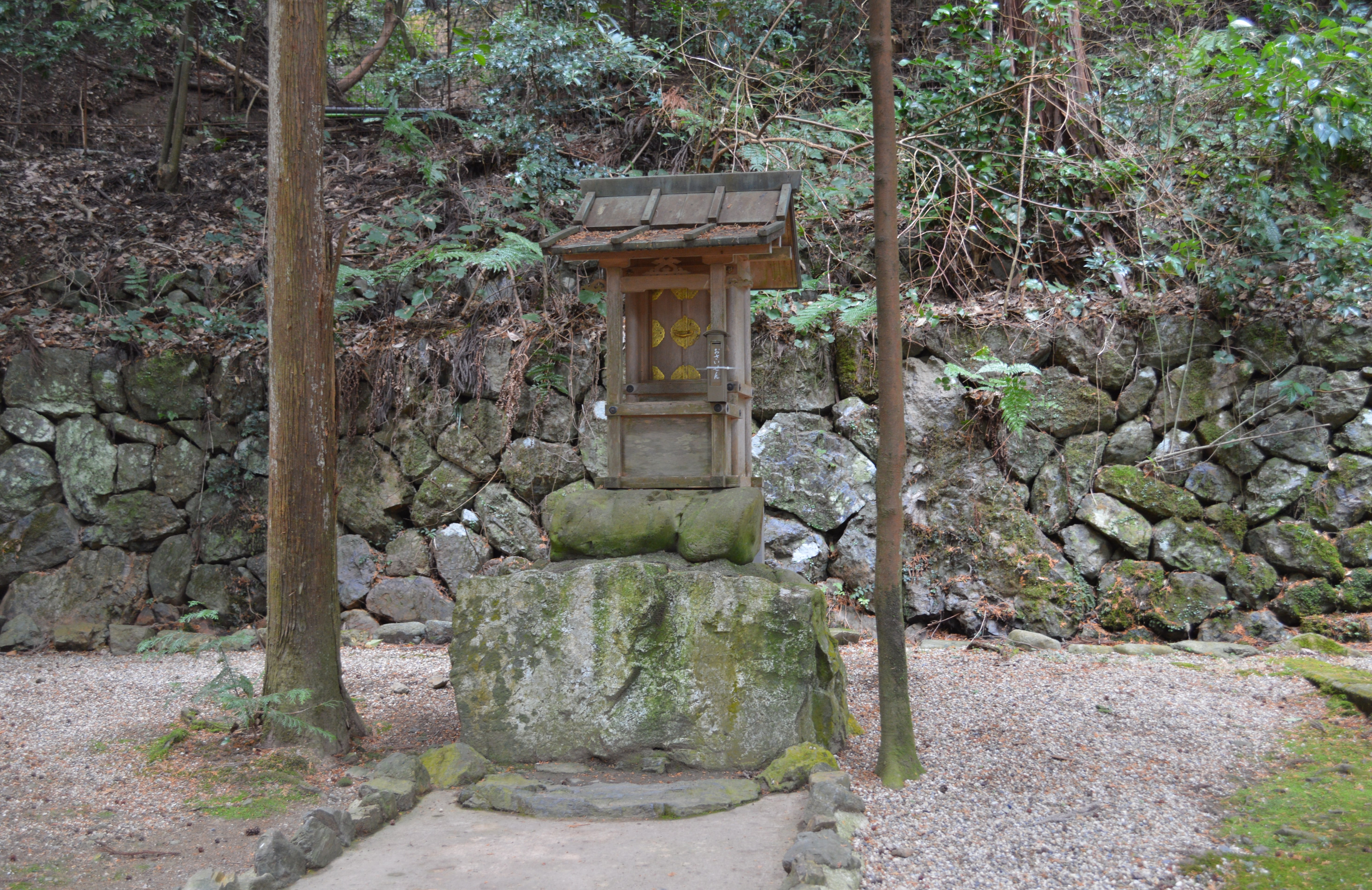
Mifune Shrine

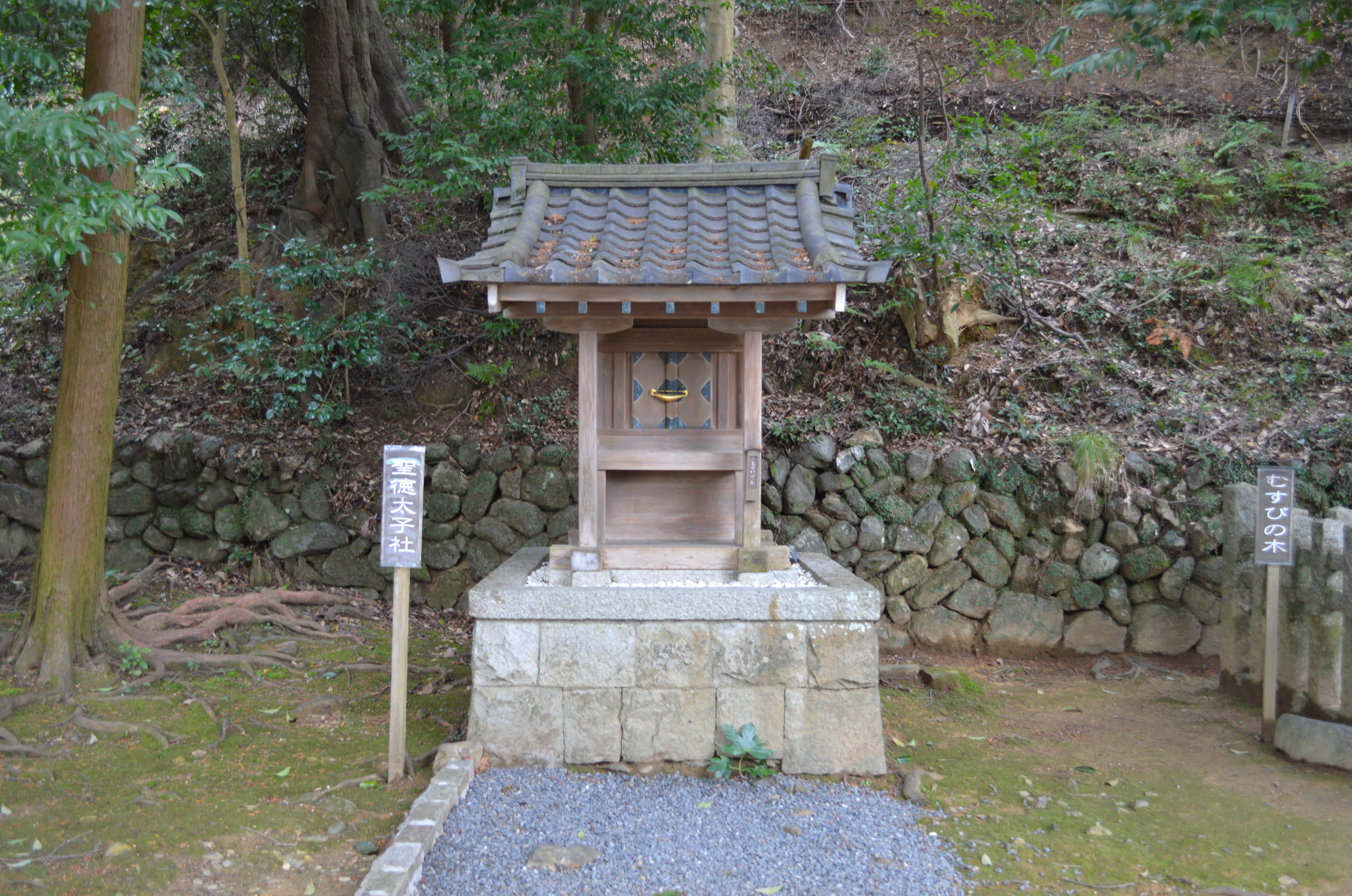
Shotoku Taishi Shrine

== Festival ==
- Annual Festival (October 3)
- Mifune Shrine Festival: On the day before Matsunoo Taisha Shinko Festival.

== See also ==
- List of Shinto shrines in Japan
