= Arashiyama (disambiguation) =

Arashiyama is a district on the western outskirts of Kyoto, Japan. The term Arashiyama may also refer to:

== People ==
- Arashiyama Jirō (嵐山 次郎; born 1943), Japanese former sumo wrestler

== Places ==
- Arashiyama Bamboo Grove, a natural bamboo forest in Arashiyama, Kyoto, Japan
- Arashiyama Main Line, a railroad company based in Kyoto Prefecture, Japan
- Arashiyama Monkey Park, a commercial park located in Arashiyama in Kyoto, Japan
- Arashiyama Station (Hankyu), a railway station in Kyoto, Japan
- Arashiyama Station (Keifuku), a tram stop in Ukyo-ku, Kyoto, Japan
- Hankyu Arashiyama Line, a railway line in Kyoto, Japan
- Saga-Arashiyama Station, a railway station situated in Ukyo-ku, Kyoto, Japan

== See also ==
- Lanshan (disambiguation)
- 嵐山 (disambiguation)
