= Nishikyō-ku =

Nishikyō 西京区
- Ward of Kyoto
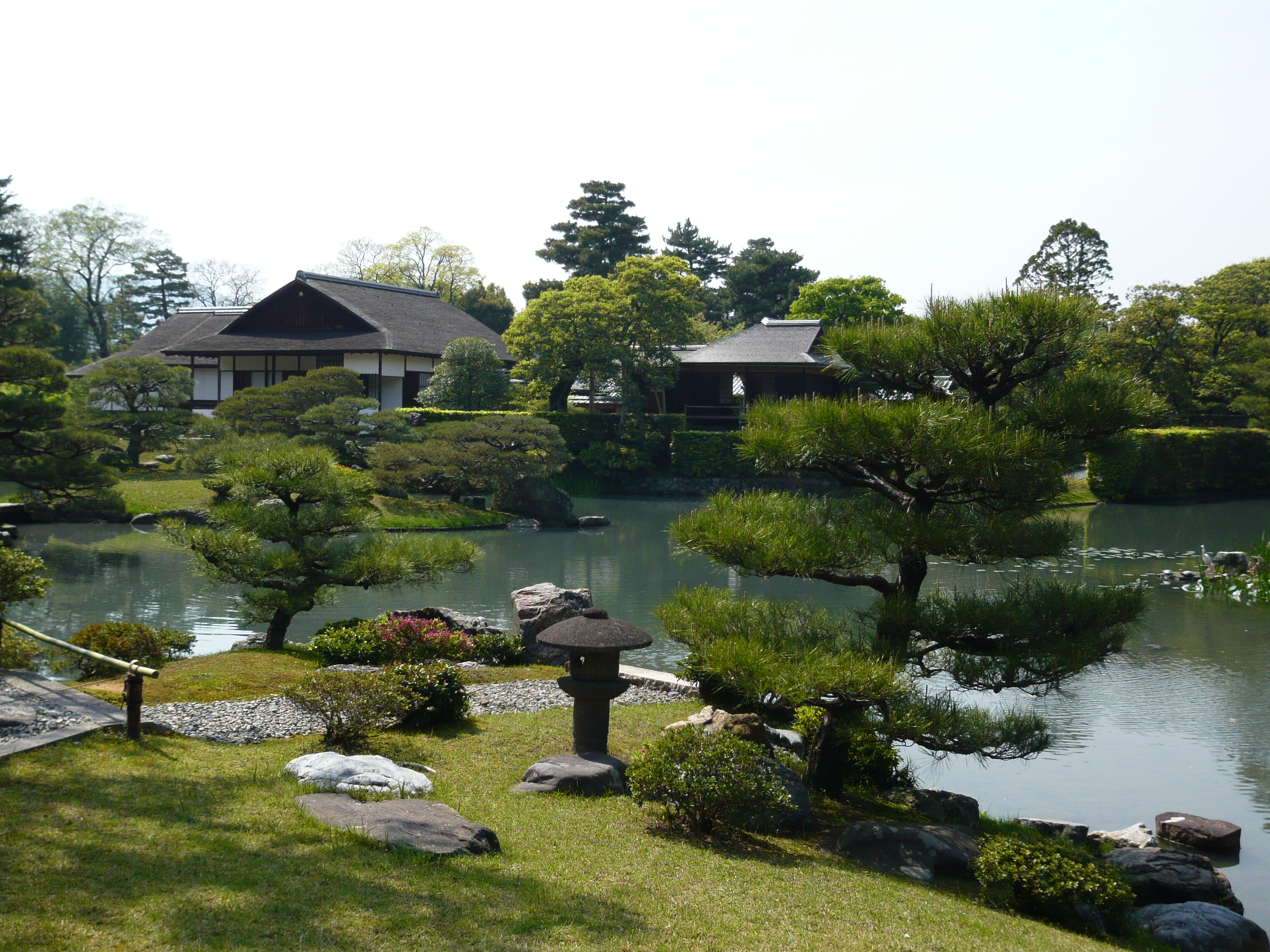
- Katsura Imperial Villa

- Location of Nishikyō-ku in Kyoto

- Location of Nishikyō-ku in Japan
- Coordinates: 34°59′6″N 135°41′36″E
- Country: Japan
- Prefecture: Kyoto
- City: Kyoto
- Founded: 1976

Area
  - Total: 59.24 km^{2} (22.87 sq mi)
- Highest elevation: 678 m (2,224 ft)
- Lowest elevation: 18 m (59 ft)

Population (October 1, 2020)
  - Total: 149,837
  - Estimate (2021): 148,370
  - Density: 2,529/km^{2} (6,551/sq mi)
- Time zone: UTC+9 (Japan Standard Time)
- Website: www.city.kyoto.lg.jp/nishikyo/

Nishikyō-ku (西京区) is one of the eleven wards in the city of Kyoto, in Kyoto Prefecture, Japan. Its name means "west capital ward" and it is situated on the western edge of the city, to the south of center. The ward was established on October 1, 1976, after it was separated from Ukyō-ku. The Katsura River is the border between Nishikyo-ku and Ukyo-ku.

Katsura Imperial Villa, on that river, is one of the most widely known features of Nishikyo-ku. Saihō-ji, the Moss Temple, is a UNESCO World Heritage Site in the ward.

Matsunoo-taisha, a Shinto shrine, is also located in Nishikyō-ku.

As of October 1, 2021 the ward has an area of 59.24 km^{2} and a population of 148,370.

== Demographics ==
Historical population
Year	Pop.	±%
1980	109,325	—
1990	142,677	+30.5%
2000	155,928	+9.3%
2010	152,974	−1.9%
2020	149,837	−2.1%

== Education ==
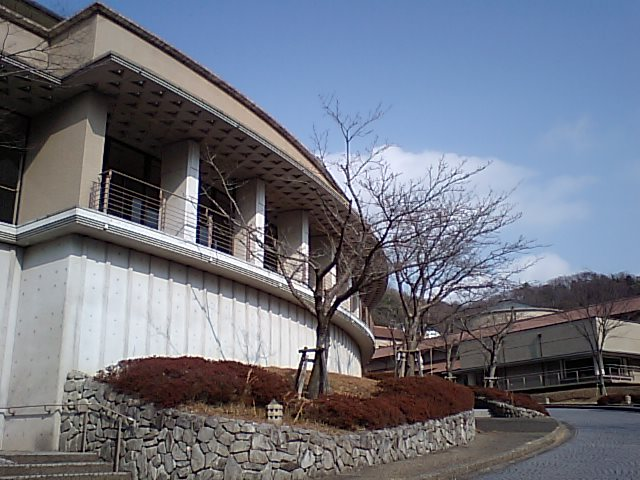
International Research Center for Japanese Studies

- International Research Center for Japanese Studies
- Katsura Campus, Kyoto University
- Kyoto City University of Arts
- Kyoto College of Economics
