= Ōkōchi Sansō =

House and garden in Kyoto, Japan

Coordinates: 35.01726954°N 135.66934757°E

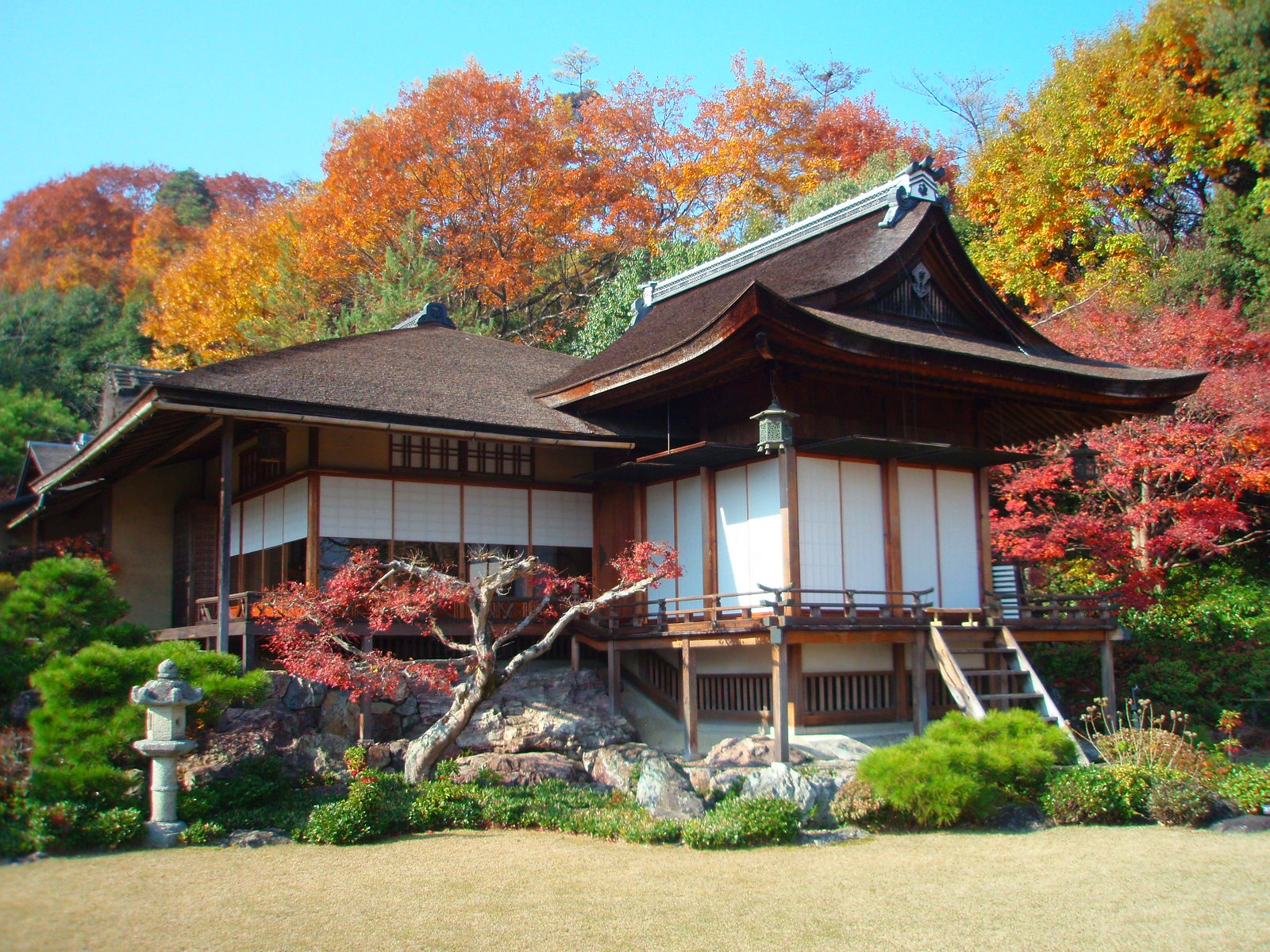
The Daijōkaku at Ōkōchi Sansō

Ōkōchi Sansō (大河内山荘, Ōkōchi Sansō; literally "Okochi Mountain Villa") is the former home and garden of the Japanese jidaigeki (period film) actor Denjirō Ōkōchi in Arashiyama, Kyoto. The villa is open to the public for an admission fee and is known for its gardens and views of the Kyoto area. Several of the buildings are recorded as cultural properties by the national government.

== Location ==
Ōkōchi Sansō is on the slopes of Mt. Ogura behind Tenryūji Temple and next to Arashiyama Park and the Sagano bamboo grove in Ukyō-ku, Kyoto.

The closest regular train station (about a 15-minute walk) is Arashiyama on the Keifuku Electric Railroad Arashiyama Main Line. Torokko Arashiyama Station on the special Sagano Scenic Railway is even closer.

== The villa ==
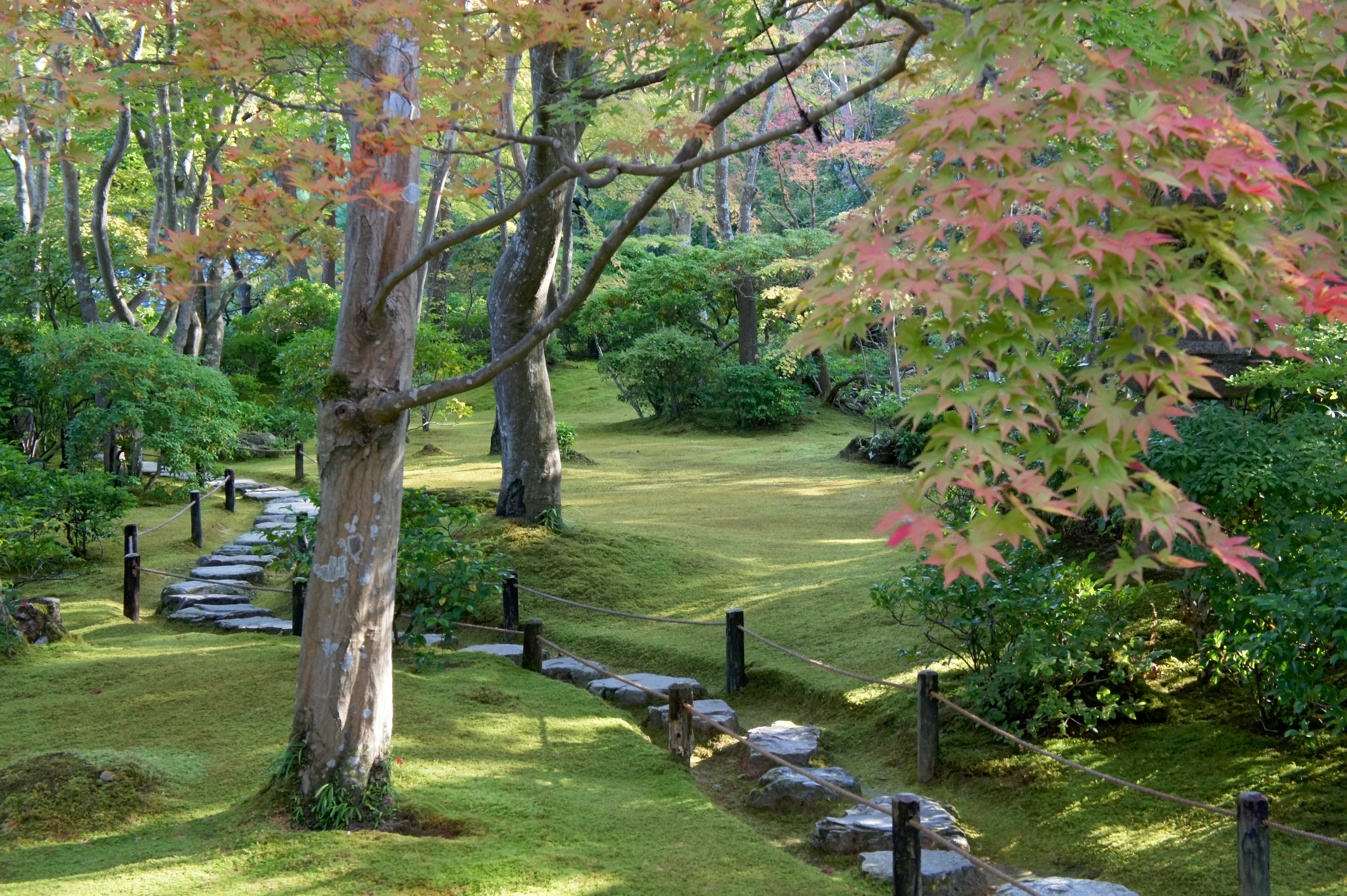
Tea garden in front of the tekisuian

The grounds of the villa encompass approximately 2 hectares and feature multiple buildings, including a Japanese-style home, tea houses, and shrines, amidst carefully maintained Japanese gardens. They were built up over a period of 30 years by Ōkōchi to function as one of his residences. They were opened to the public after his death in 1962. The main structures were built in the 1930s and 1940s except for the Jibutsudō, which is a Meiji Era building that was moved to this site.

The gardens were designed to show off each of the four seasons. Since the villa is on top of a hill, the city of Kyoto, Mt. Hiei, and the Hozu River gorge are well visible from points on the grounds.

== Facilities ==
Four of the structures on the grounds were recorded as tangible cultural properties (tōroku yūkei bunkazai) by the national government in 2003:

- Daijōkaku (the main house, known for boldly combining shoin-zukuri, sukiya-zukuri and other styles)
- Jibutsudō (a Buddhist shrine, with irimoya style roof)
- Tekisuian (a chashitsu, or tea house)
- Chūmon (the middle gate)

There is an open-air museum dedicated to Denjirō Ōkōchi and an observation platform. Matcha tea and a sweet used to be included in the price of admission. They still offer various refreshments at the main teahouse, but the sweet has been abandoned.

== Gallery ==
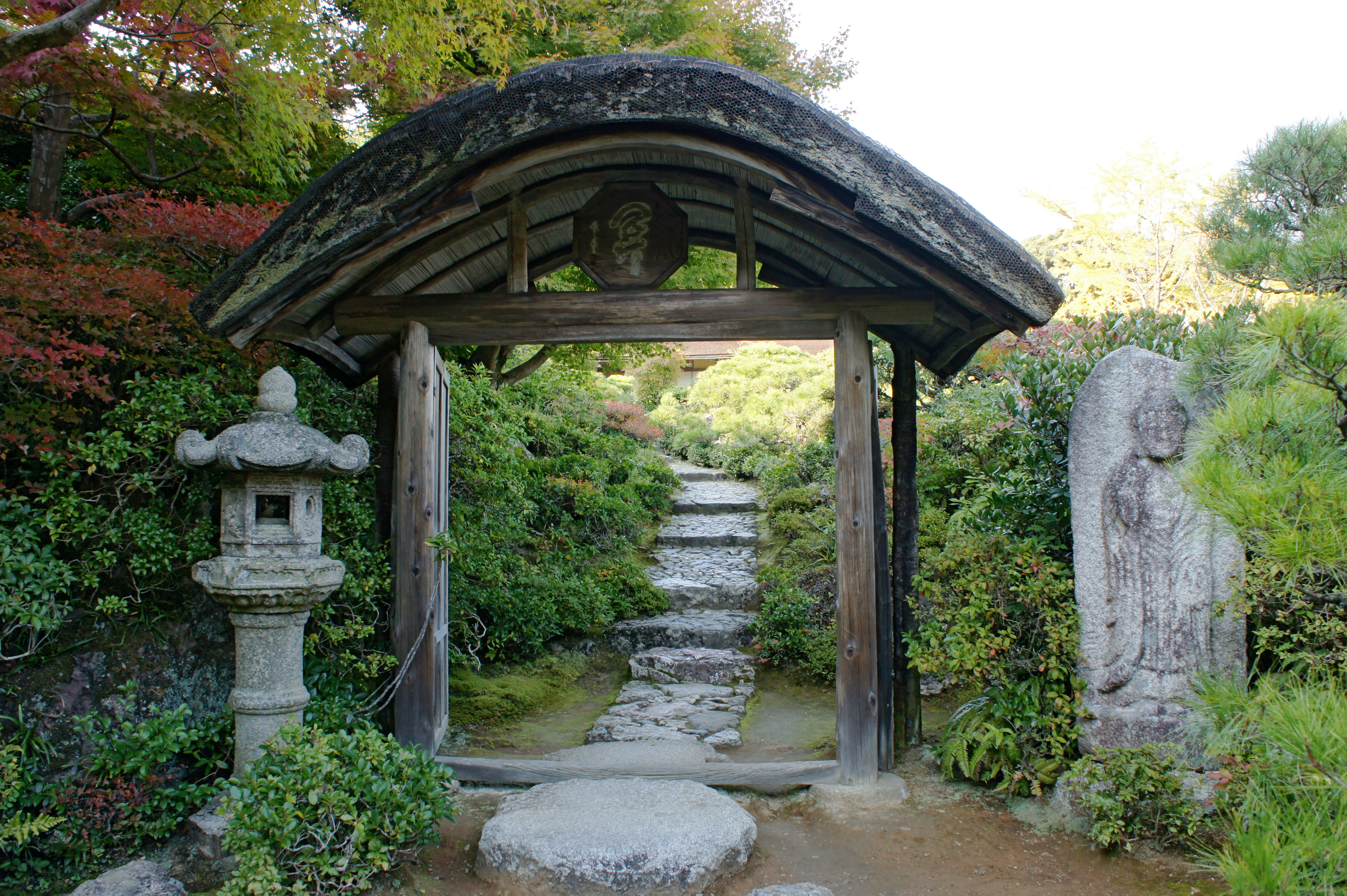
Chūmon (the middle gate)

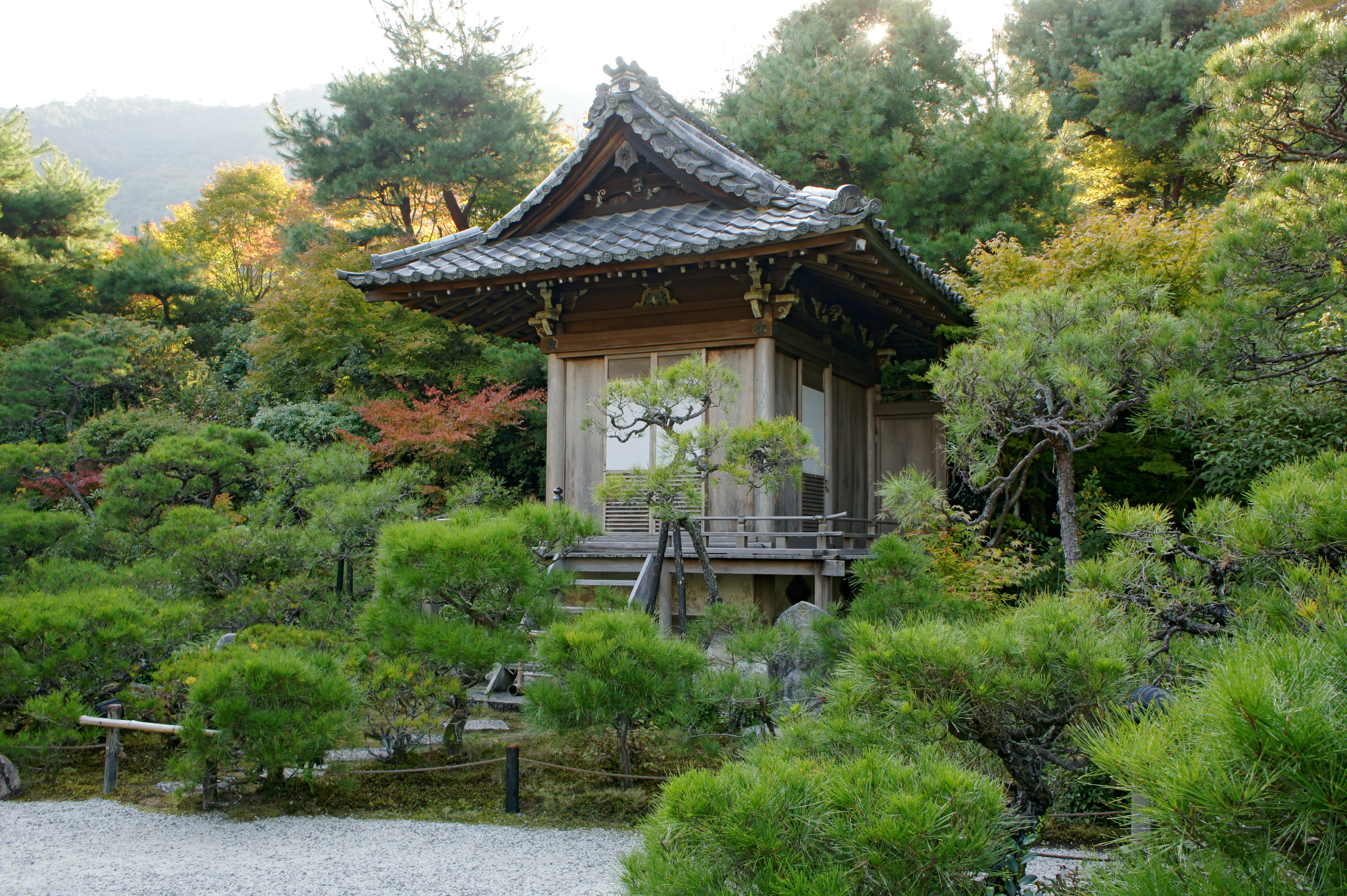
Jibutsudō

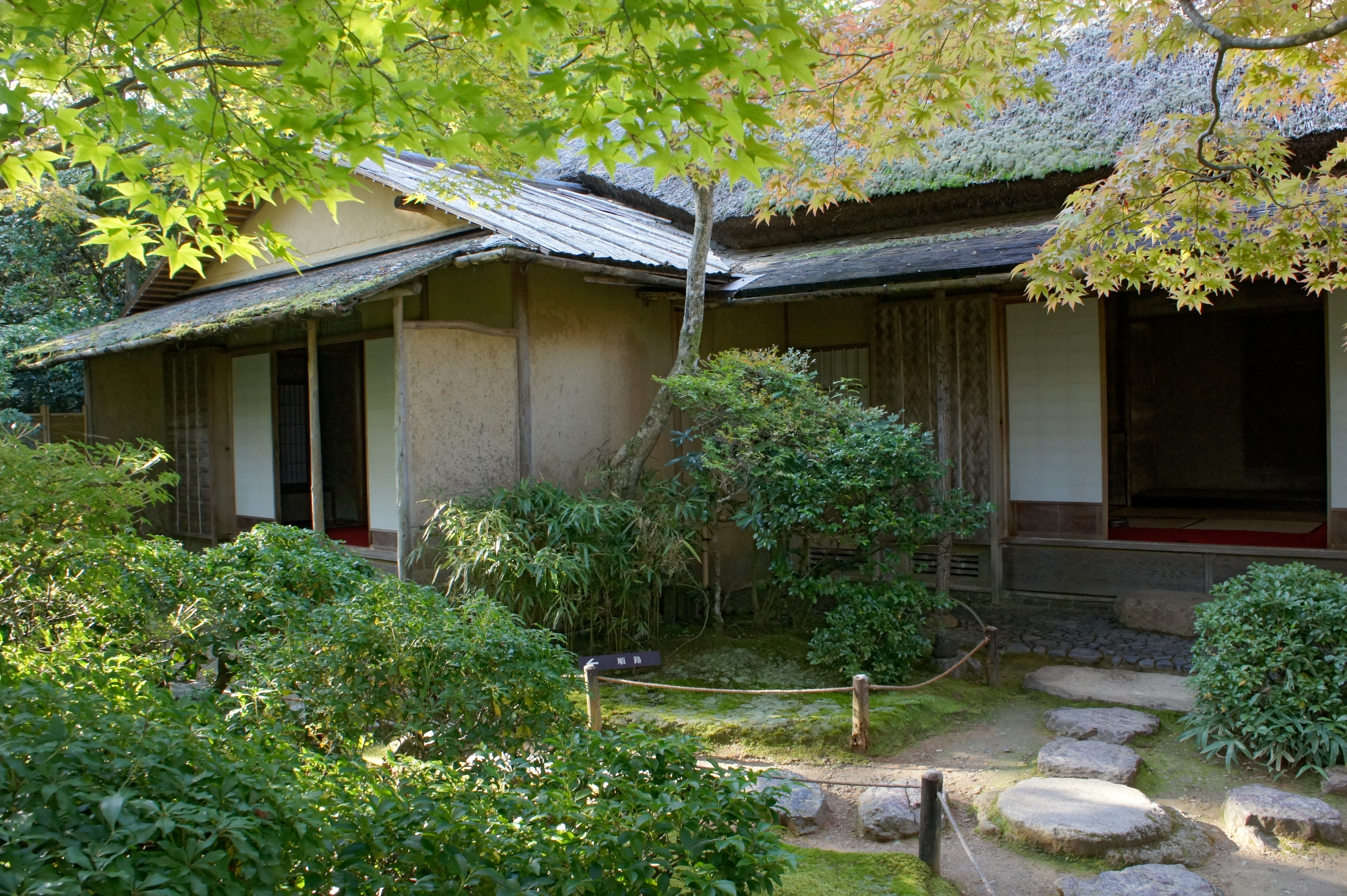
Tekisuian

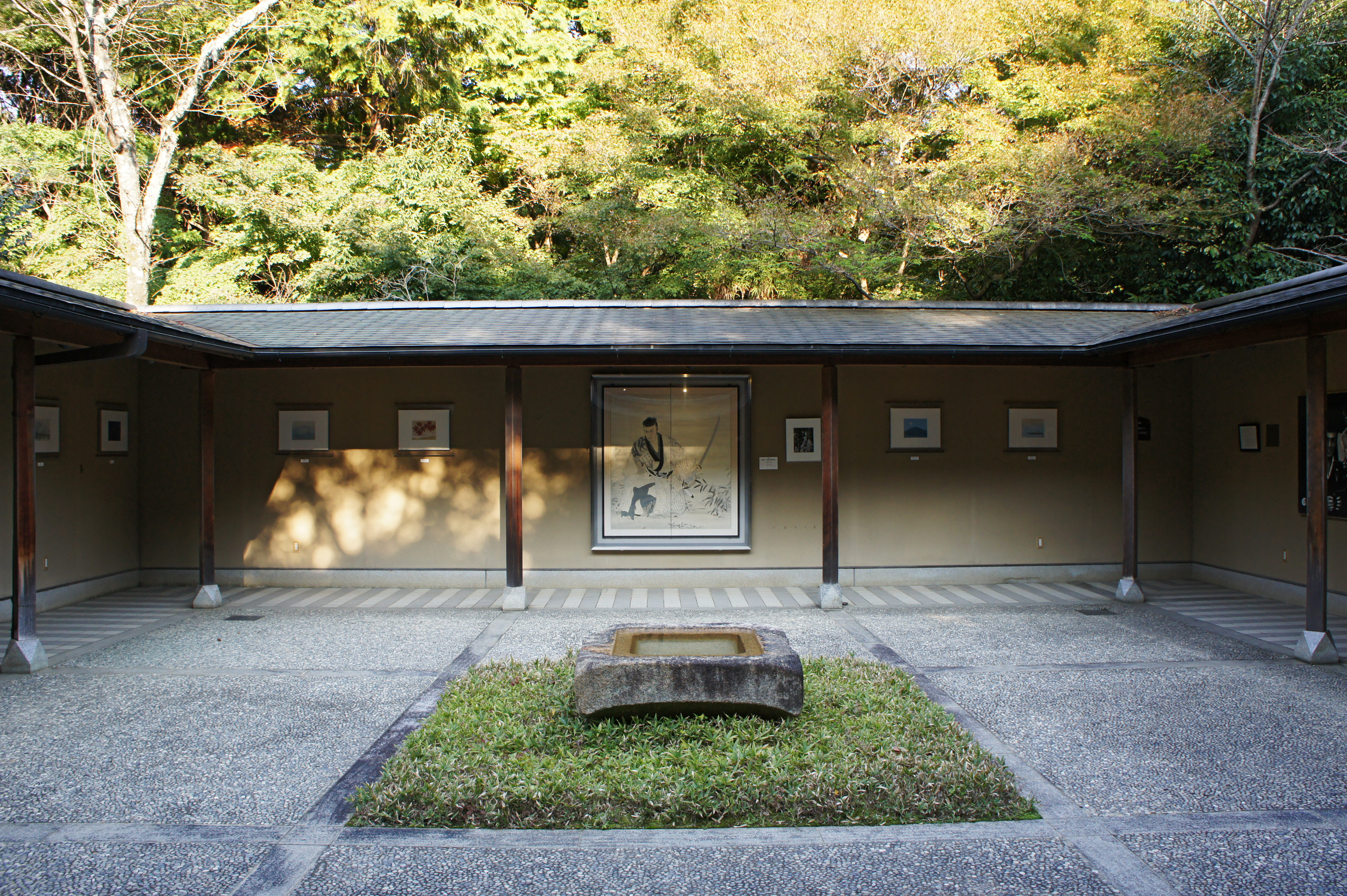
Museum for Denjirō Ōkōchi
