= Lanshan =

Lanshan may refer to:

- Lanshan County (蓝山县), Yongzhou, Hunan
- Lanshan District, Rizhao (岚山区), Shandong
  - Lanshan Port (岚山港)
- Lanshan District, Linyi (兰山区), Shandong
  - Lanshan Subdistrict, Lanshan District, Linyi
- Lanshan, Jiangsu (岚山镇), town in and subdivision of Suining County, Jiangsu
- Lanshan Township (兰山乡), subdivision of Dongzhou District, Fushun, Liaoning
- Orchid or Lan Hills (兰山), Gansu, namesake of Lanzhou
- Panling Lanshan (襴衫), traditional Chinese attire (hanfu) for men
