= Yodo =

Yodo may refer to:

== Geography ==
- The Yodo River in Osaka Prefecture, Japan
- Yodo, Kyoto, a neighborhood in Fushimi-ku, Kyoto, Japan
- Yōdo Station, East Japan Railway station on the Hachikō Line in Yorii, Saitama
- Ryŏdo (also spelled Yŏdo), island in Wonsan harbour, Kangwon Province, North Korea

== People ==
- Yodo-dono (1567 or 69 – 1615), a concubine of Toyotomi Hideyoshi
- Yamauchi Yōdō (1827–1872), Japanese daimyō in the Shikoku region in the late Edo period

== Entertainment ==
- "Yodo", the lead single from the album Apex Predator by Crooked I
- Yōdō, Japanese entertainment agency which represents Yosuke Kishi
- "Yōdō", a 2013 episode of Japanese animated series Coppelion

== Other ==
- Japanese cruiser Yodo
- Yodo, the name of the aircraft involved in Japan Air Lines Flight 351
