= Lanshan Port =

Port in China

Lanshan port 岚山港
- Prefecture-level city
- Location in China
- Coordinates: 35°09′N 119°39′E
- Country: People's Republic of China
- Province: Shandong

Government
  - Type: Prefecture-level city
- Time zone: UTC+8 (China Standard)
- Postal code: (Urban center)
- ISO 3166 code: CN-JS-07
- Major Nationalities: Han
- License Plate: 鲁L

Lanshan Port
- Simplified Chinese: 岚山港
- Traditional Chinese: 岚山港
- Hanyu Pinyin: lánshān gǎng
- Literal meaning: The port connected to misty mountain
Transcriptions
Standard Mandarin
- Hanyu Pinyin: lánshān gǎng

Lanshan port (Chinese: 岚山港; pinyin: lánshān gang) is a large bulk loading and discharging port located in Shandong, China. It is situated on the Yellow Sea midway between Rizhao and Lianyungang, and adjacent to Haizhou bay.
