= Katsura, Kyoto =

Neighborhood in Kyoto, Japan

Coordinates: 34.98°N 135.7°E

Katsura 桂
- Interactive map of Katsura
- Country: Japan
- Prefecture: Kyoto Prefecture
- City: Kyoto City
- Ward: Nishikyo

Area
  - Total: 5.566 km^{2} (2.149 sq mi)

Population (1 October 2015)
  - Total: 49,696
  - Density: 8,928/km^{2} (23,120/sq mi)
- Time zone: UTC+9 (JST)

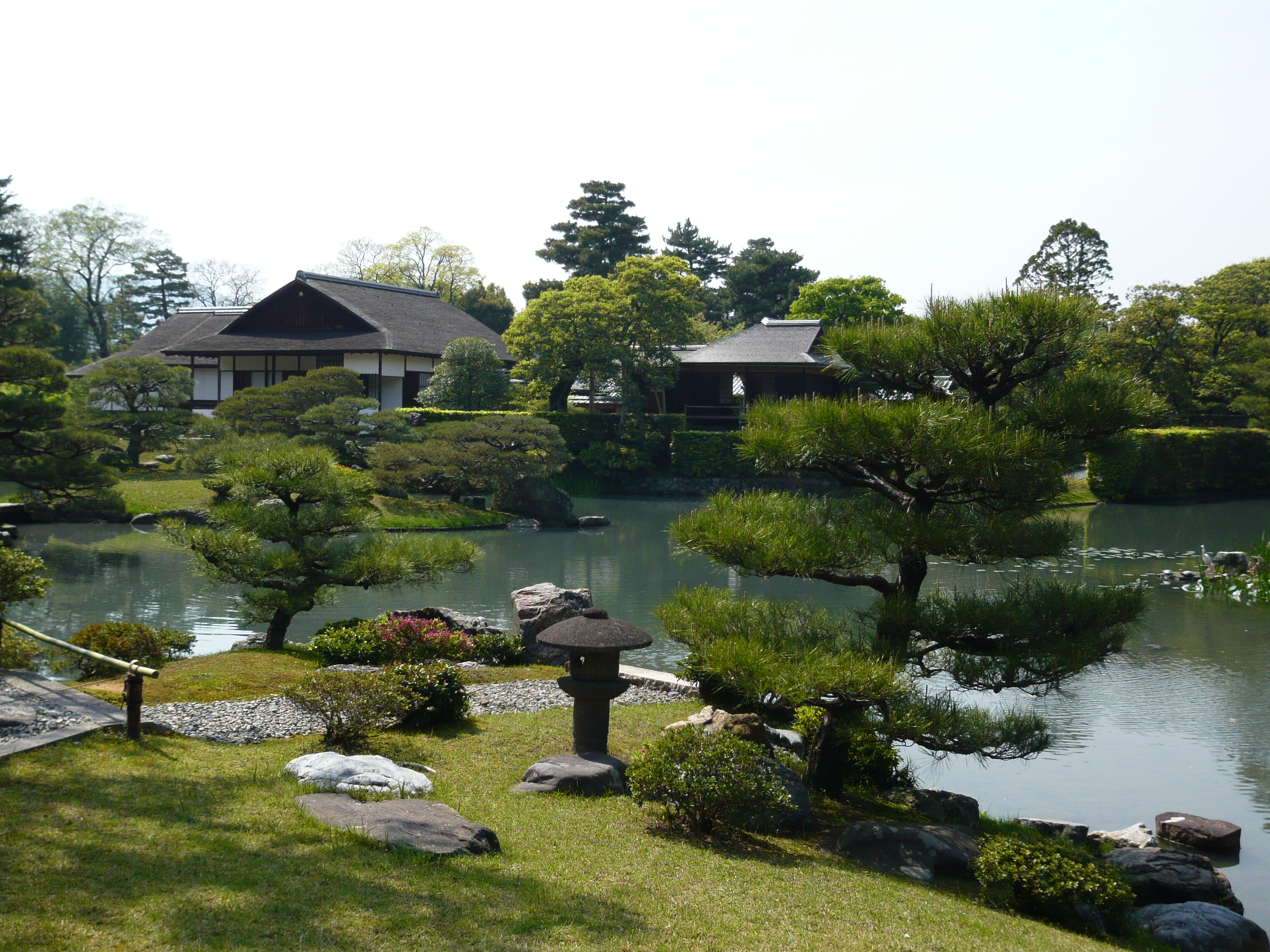
Imperial villa of Katsura

Katsura (桂) is a neighborhood in Nishikyo-ku, in the western part of the city of Kyoto, Japan. Predominantly residential in character the district is situated and the western bank of the Katsura River. The neighborhood is renowned as the location of the Katsura Imperial Villa, a historic garden maintained by the Imperial Household Agency.

Katsura is accessible from Katsura Station on the Hankyu Kyoto Line by train, and by buses offered by, among other organizations, the Kyoto Municipal Transportation Bureau.

== See also ==
- Katsura River
