= Arashiyama =

District of Kyoto, Japan

Coordinates: 35°00′54″N 135°40′14″E

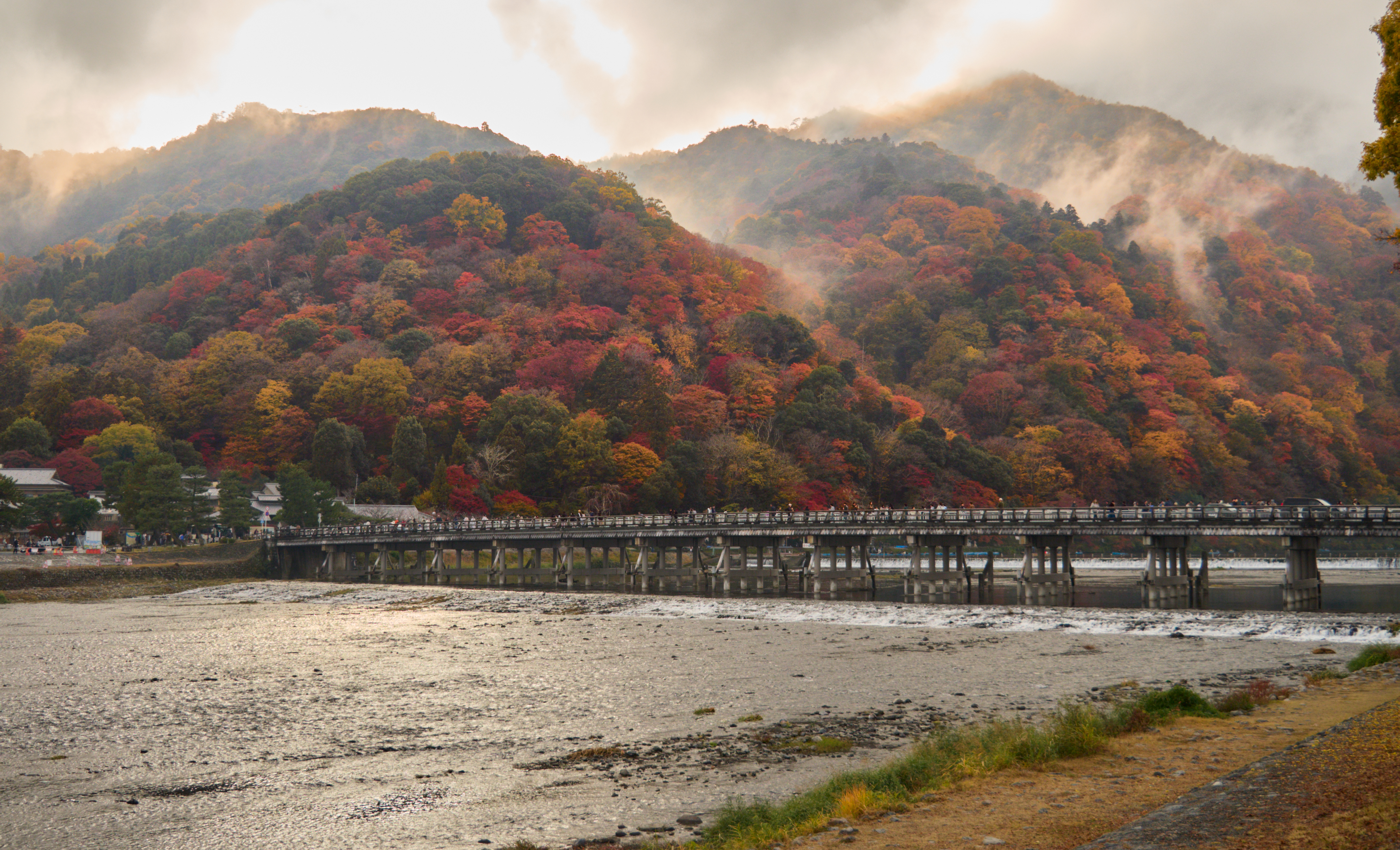
The Togetsukyo Bridge spanning the Oi River at Arashiyama, in autumn.

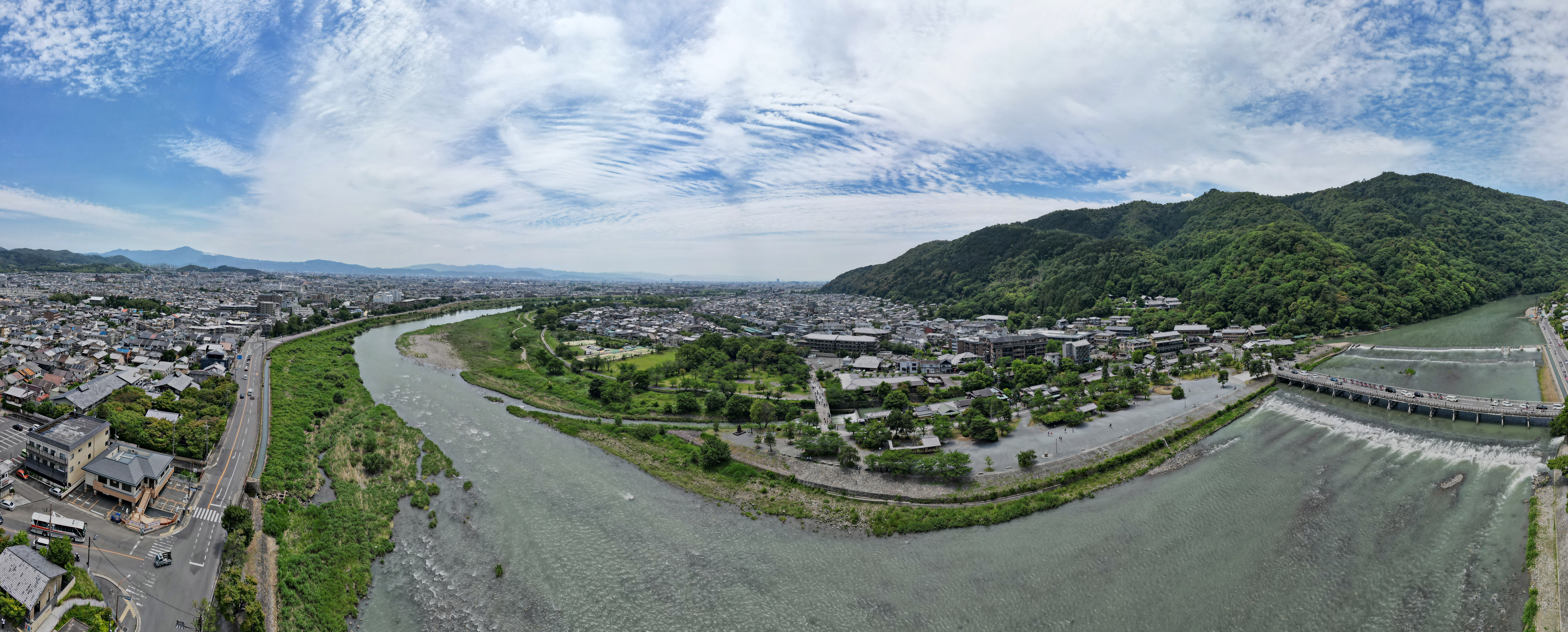
Aerial perspective of Arashiyama Park Nakanoshima Area 嵐山公園 中之島地区

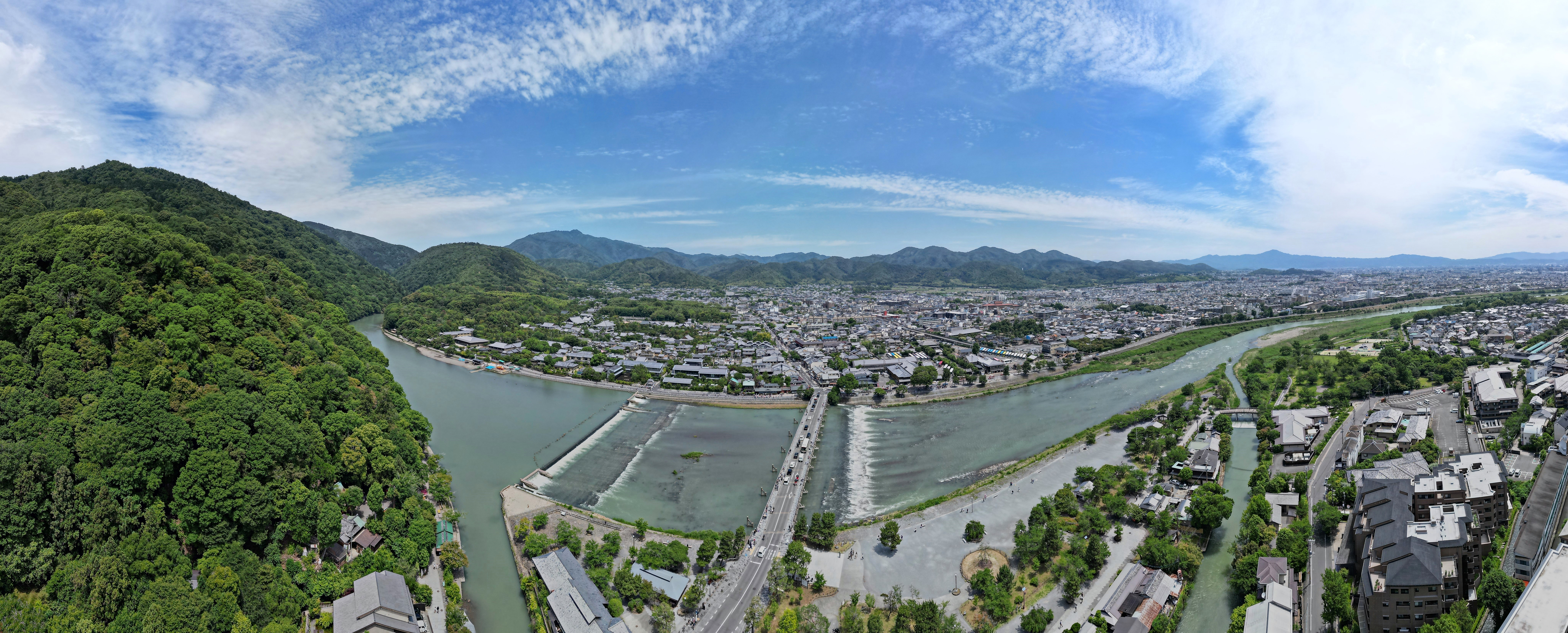
Aerial panorama of Arashiyama (嵐山)

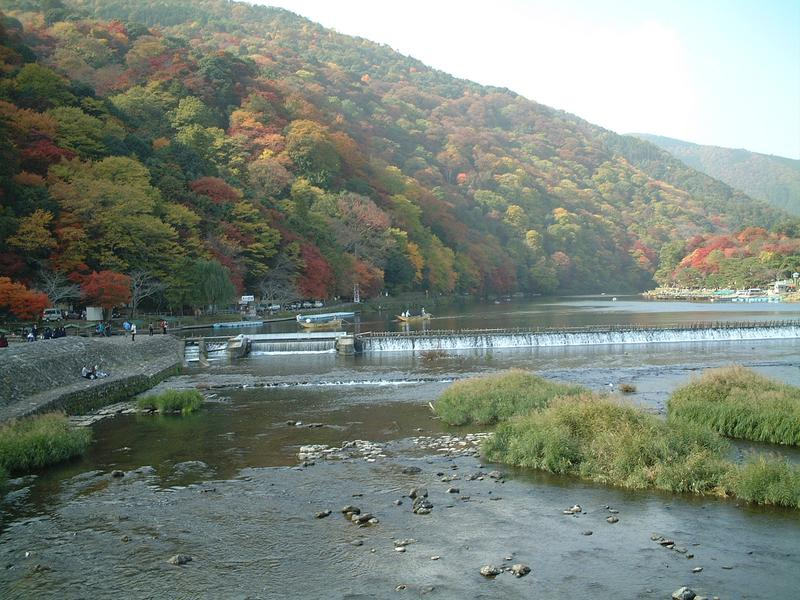
Mount Arashi (Arashiyama) across the Ōi River

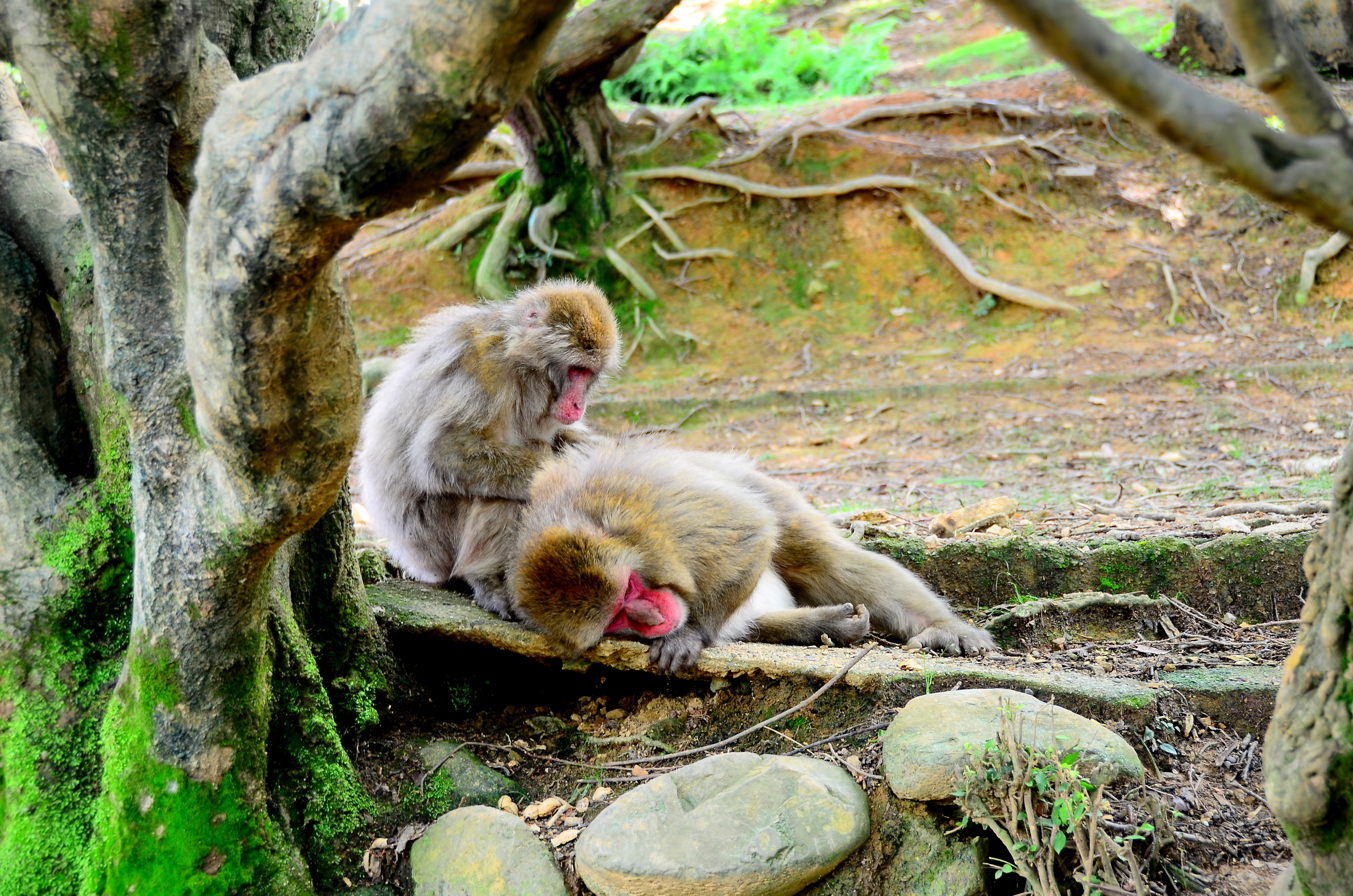
Iwatayama Monkey Park

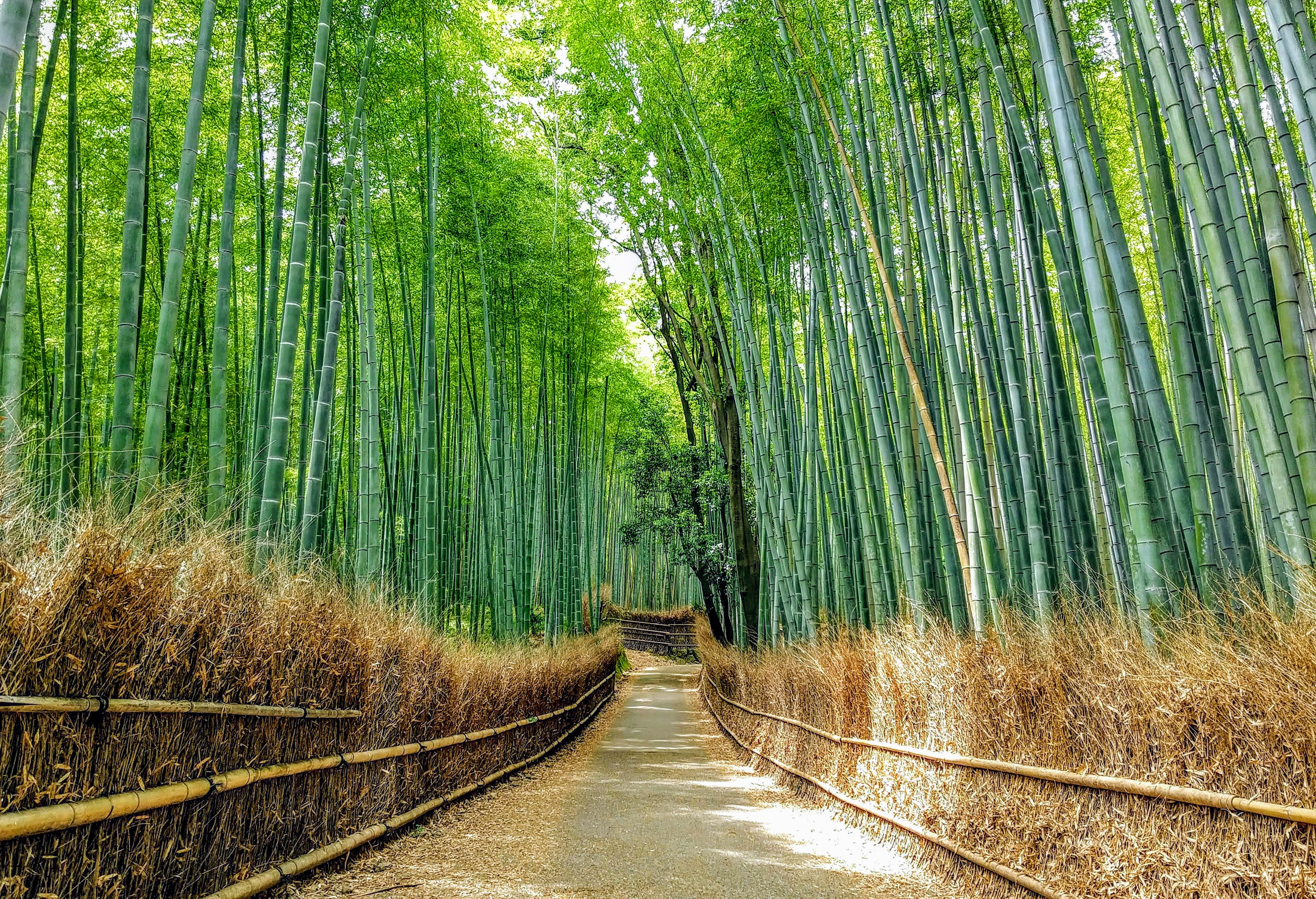
Bamboo forest in Arashiyama

Arashiyama (嵐山, Storm Mountain) is a district on the western outskirts of Kyoto, Japan. It also refers to the mountain across the Ōi River, which forms a backdrop to the district. Arashiyama is a nationally designated historic site and place of scenic beauty.

== Notable tourist sites ==
- Arashiyama Bamboo Grove (a.k.a. the Sagano Bamboo Forest)
- The Iwatayama Monkey Park on the slopes of Arashiyama. Over 170 monkeys live at the park. While the monkeys are wild, they have become accustomed to humans. The park is on a small mountain not far from the Saga-Arashiyama rail station. Visitors can approach and photograph the monkeys. At the summit is a fenced enclosure where visitors can feed the monkeys.
- The Moon Crossing Bridge (渡月橋, Togetsukyō), notable for its views of cherry blossoms and autumn colors on the slopes of Arashiyama
- The tombstone of the Heike courtesan Kogo of Sagano
- Tenryū-ji, the main temple of one of the 15 branches of the Rinzai school, one of the two main sects of Zen Buddhism in Japan
- The hamlet of Kiyotaki, a small scenic village at the base of Mt. Atago, the home to a notable Shinto shrine.
- Matsunoo Taisha, a shrine half a mile south of the area, is home to a blessed spring. It is one of the oldest shrines in the Kyoto area, founded in 700. The alleged restorative properties of the spring bring many local sake and miso companies for prayers that their product will be blessed.
- Kameyama Park has a stone commemorating Zhou Enlai's visit to Arashiyama. He was moved by the cherry blossoms and mountain greenery. The four poems he wrote about his visit are engraved on a stone monument: "Arashiyama in the Rain."
- Ōkōchi Sansō, the Japanese-style home and gardens of the film actor Denjirō Ōkōchi.
- Cherry trees bloom in spring and leaves turn red in autumn.

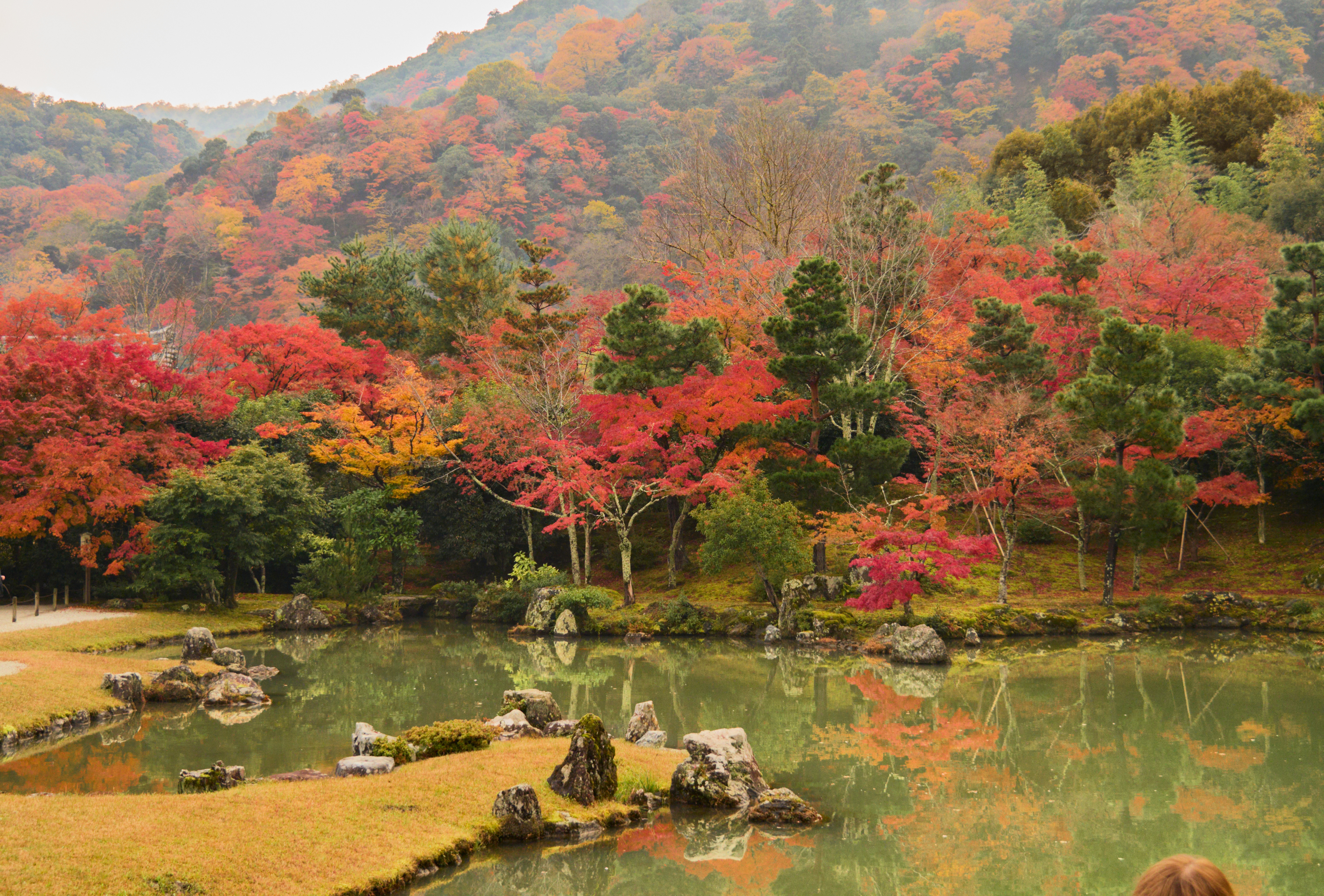
Sōgenchi Garden pond at Tenryū-ji temple, in autumn

== Transport ==
Arashiyama is a walkable area accessible by the Keifuku Electric Railroad (via Arashiyama Station (Keifuku)) from central Kyoto or by the Hankyū Arashiyama Line (via Arashiyama Station (Hankyu)) from Katsura Station, with connections from Osaka and Kyoto. Additionally, the JR Saga-Arashiyama Station is located in the district's suburbs.

== Togetsukyō ==
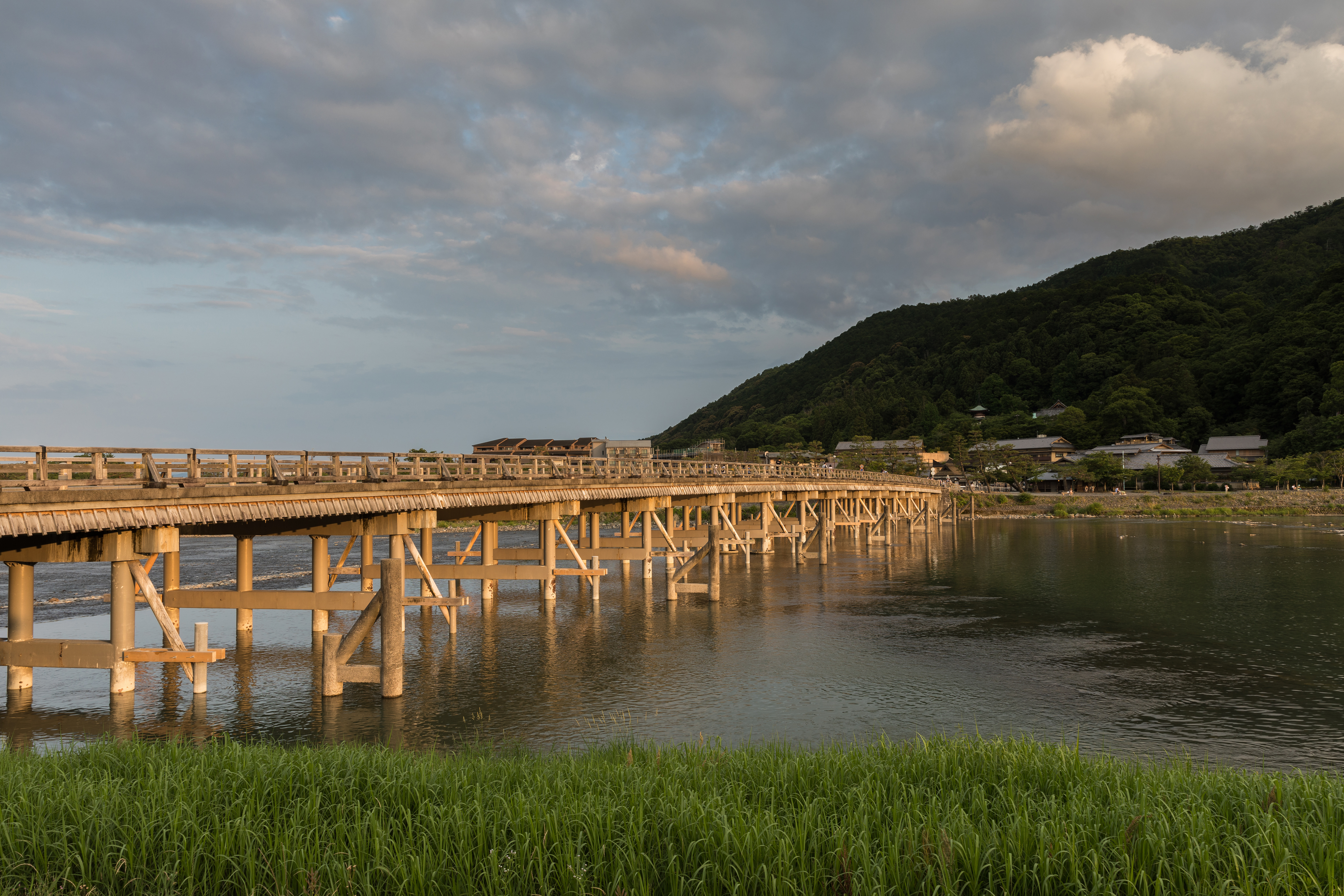
Togetsukyō

Togetsukyō (渡月橋) is a bridge across the river. It is the subject of one of the Famous Views of the Sixty-odd Provinces ukiyo-e prints. The Japanese used mostly concrete in 1934 to rebuild the Togetsu Bridge, unlike the original destroyed wooden version of the bridge from 836.

The river has three different names that denote its upper, middle, and lower stretches. It is called the Ōi River (大堰川, Ōi-gawa) in the upper course (not to be confused with the homophonously named Ōi River (大井川, Ōi-gawa), further to the east in Shizuoka Prefecture), the Hozu River (保津川, Hozu-gawa) in the middle course, and the Katsura River (桂川, Katsura-gawa) in the lower course.
