= Hozu River =

River in Kyoto Prefecture, Japan

Coordinates: 35°01′19″N 135°39′21″E

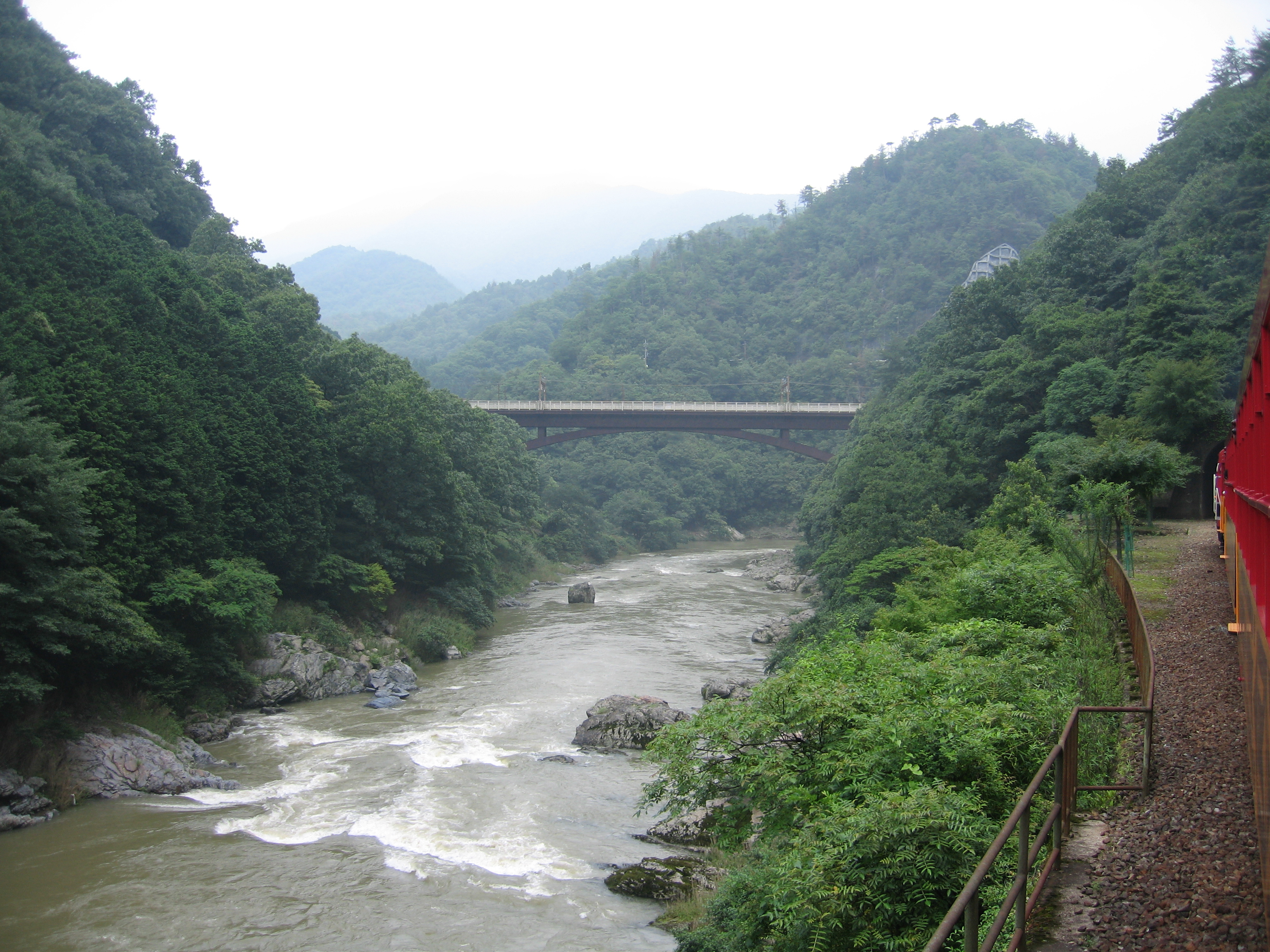

The Hozu River (保津川, Hozugawa) is a part of Katsura River in Kyoto Prefecture, Japan. The river begins in the mountains near Kameoka, a town northwest of Kyoto City. It snakes into the Arashiyama section of western Kyoto before changing its name to Katsura River.

The Hozu River is considered scenic, and is known primarily for its association with Hozugawa Kudari, literally "down the Hozu river", a sightseeing whitewater boat that goes downstream from Kameoka to Arashiyama. Hozugawa Kudari is especially popular in the fall, when the Japanese Maple leaves change colors, and in the Spring, when the sakura, or Japanese cherry tree, blooms. The trip usually takes about two hours.

In August, 2006, a rock fell from the mountains that line the river and hit a woman on the head, seriously injuring her. Overall, however, Hozugawa Kudari is considered safe.

== Gallery ==
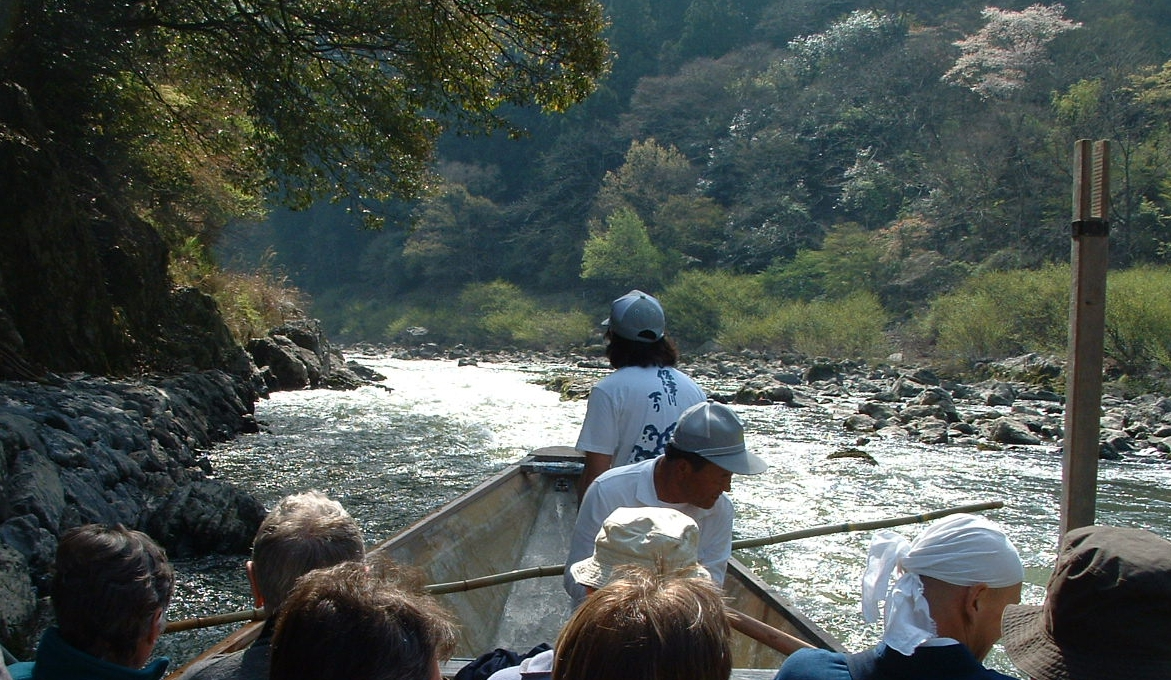
Boat on Hozu River

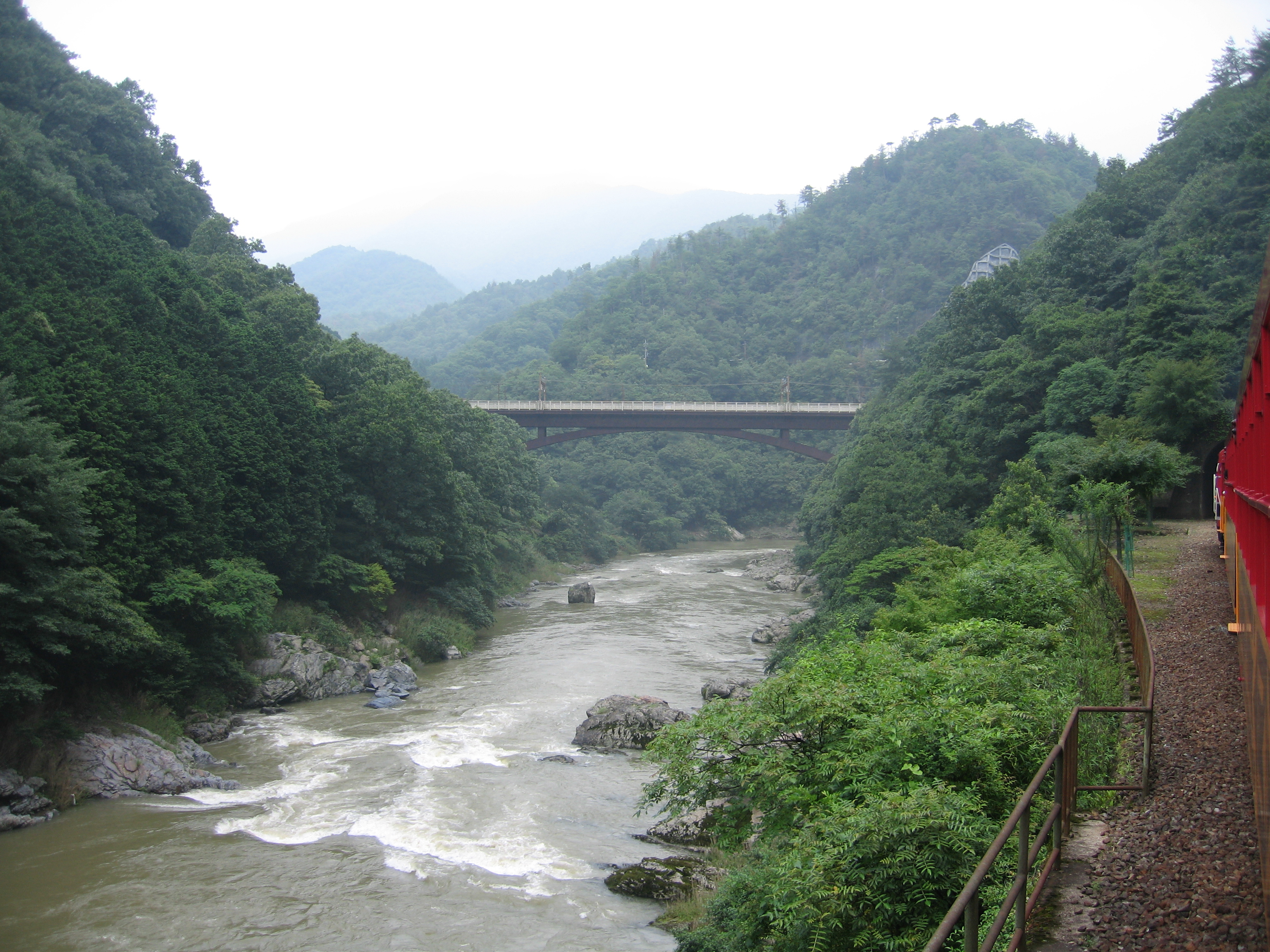
Hozu River from the Romantic Train
