= Lanshan, Rizhao =

Lanshan District 岚山区
- District
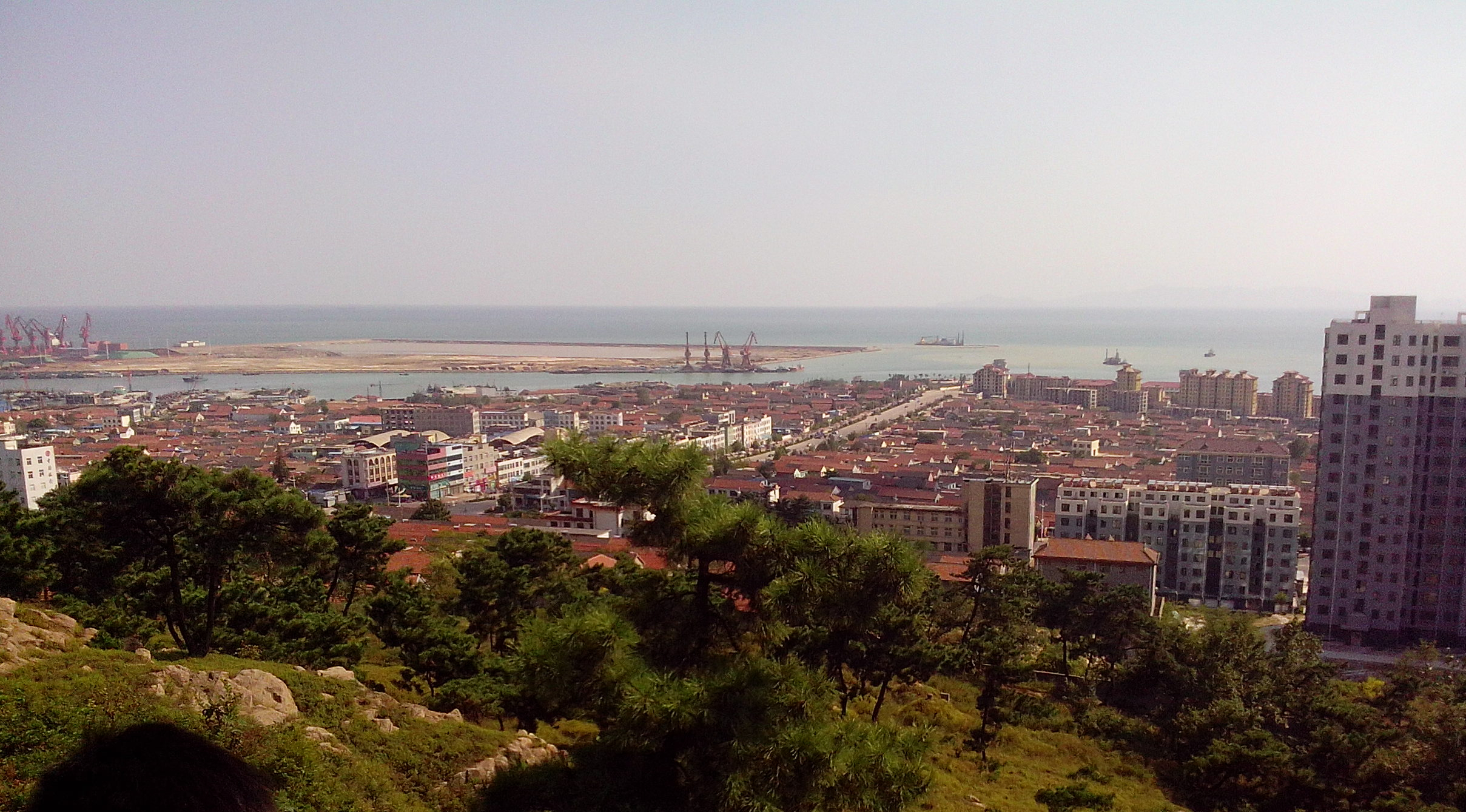

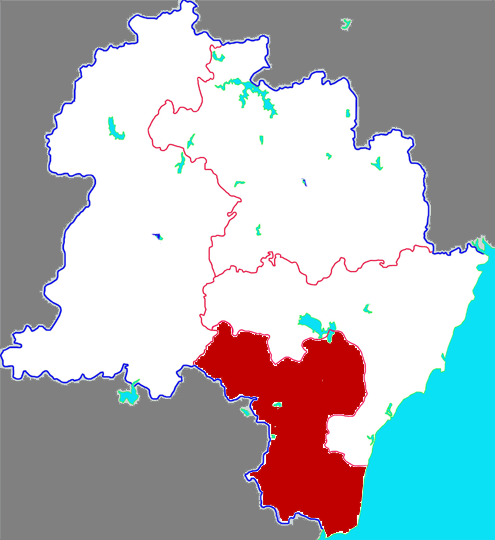
- Location in Rizhao

- Location in Shandong
- Coordinates: 35°07′19″N 119°19′09″E
- Country: People's Republic of China
- Province: Shandong
- Prefecture-level city: Rizhao

Area
  - Total: 646 km^{2} (249 sq mi)

Population (2019)
  - Total: 409,700
  - Density: 634/km^{2} (1,640/sq mi)
- Time zone: UTC+8 (China Standard)
- Postal code: 276800
- Website: www.rzlanshan.gov.cn

Lanshan District (simplified Chinese: 岚山区; traditional Chinese: 嵐山區; pinyin: Lánshān Qū) is one of two districts of the prefecture-level city of Rizhao, in the south of Shandong province, China, bordering Jiangsu province to the south.

== Administrative divisions ==
As of 2012, this district is divided to 2 subdistricts, 6 towns and 1 township.

Subdistricts

- Lanshantou Subdistrict (岚山头街道)
- Andongwei Subdistrict (安东卫街道)

Towns

- Beikuo (碑廓镇)
- Hushan (虎山镇)
- Jufeng (巨峰镇)
- Gaoxing (高兴镇)
- Houcun (后村镇)
- Huangdun (黄墩镇)

Townships

- Qiansandao Township (前三岛乡)
