= Katsura River =

River in Kansai, Japan

Coordinates: 34°52′50″N 135°40′41″E

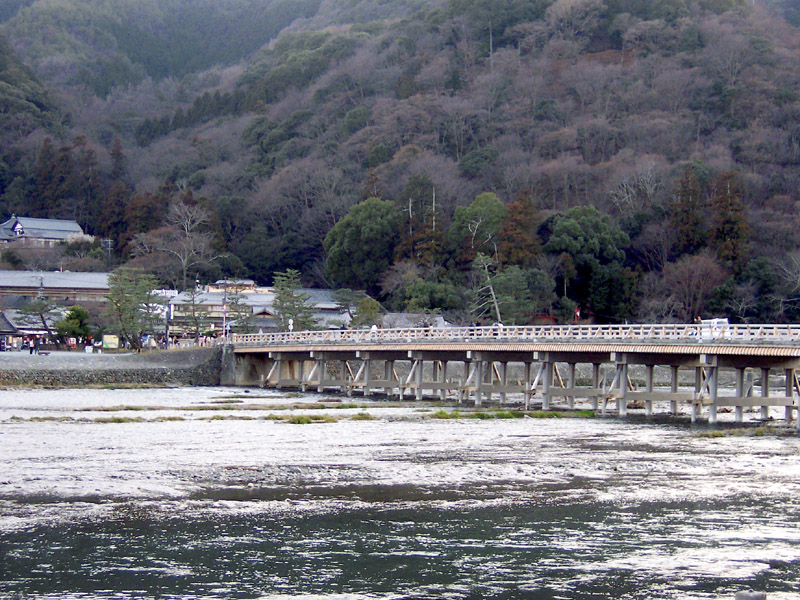
- The Togetsukyo Bridge

- Native name: 桂川 (Japanese)

Location
- Country: Japan

Physical characteristics
- Mouth
  - location: Yodo River
- Length: 107 km (66 mi)
- Basin size: 1,159 km^{2} (447 sq mi)

Basin features
- River system: Yodo River

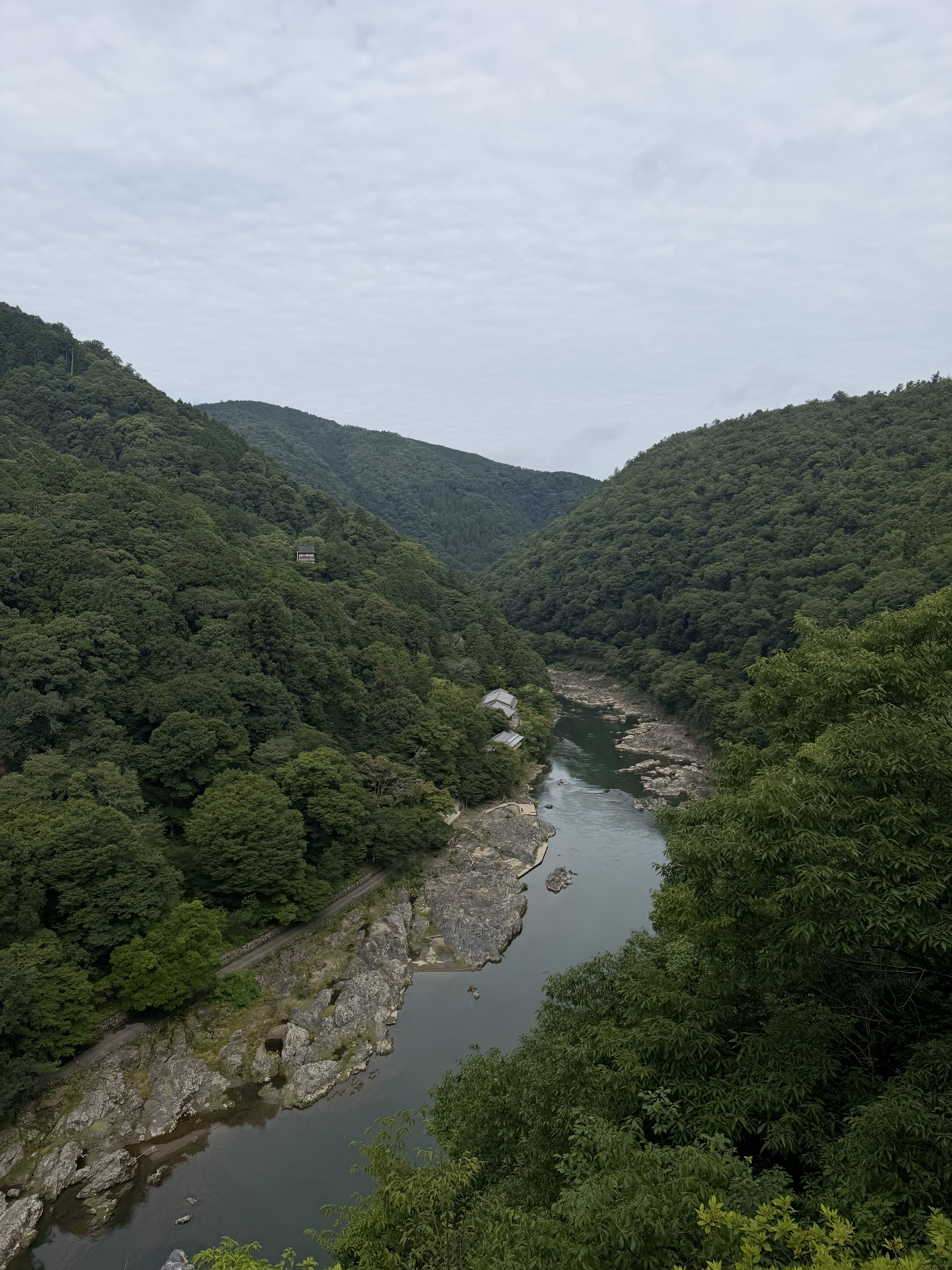
View of the Katsura River from an observation deck in Arashiyama Park

The Katsura River (桂川, Katsura-gawa) is a tributary of the Yodo River in the Kyoto Prefecture, Honshu island, Japan.

Traditionally it was regarded as the Western border of Kyoto city (in the East it was the Kamo River).

The river rises near the Sasari mountain pass, close to the city of Nantan.

It emerges from the mountains and expands into a shallow, slow-flowing river until Togetsukyo Bridge in Arashiyama. From that point forward, the river is referred to as the Katsura River, and its flow continues for several kilometers through Kyoto Prefecture until it joins the Kamo and Yodo rivers.

The Katsura River area features some of the oldest shrines in Kyoto and Japan, such as Matsuo Shrine, and, as a counterpoint to the channelled Kamo River, supports acres of agricultural area on its flood plain. It also is known for its summer supply of ayu.

== See also ==
- Katsura, Kyoto
- Hozu River
