= Outline of Kyoto =

Overview of and topical guide to Kyoto

Flag of Kyoto

Emblem of Kyoto

The following outline is provided as an overview of and topical guide to Kyoto:

Kyoto – capital city of Kyoto Prefecture, located in the Kansai region of Japan. It is most well known in Japanese history for being the former Imperial capital of Japan for more than one thousand years, as well as a major part of the Kyoto-Osaka-Kobe metropolitan area.

== General reference ==
- Pronunciation: English: /kiˈoʊtoʊ, ˈkjoʊtoʊ/, Japanese: [kʲoꜜːto];
- Common English name(s): Kyoto
- Official English name(s): Kyoto
- Adjectival(s):
- Demonym(s):

== Geography of Kyoto ==
Geography of Kyoto

- Kyoto is:
  - a city
    - capital of the Kyoto Prefecture
- Population of Kyoto: 1,472,027
- Area of Kyoto: 827.83 km^{2} (319.63 sq mi)
- Atlas of Kyoto

Kyoto 京都市
- Location within Japan
- Coordinates: 35°0′42″N 135°46′6″E
- Country: Japan
- Region: Kansai
- Prefecture: Kyoto

=== Location of Kyoto ===
- Kyoto is situated within the following regions:
  - Northern Hemisphere and Eastern Hemisphere
    - Eurasia
      - Asia (outline)
        - East Asia
          - Japan (outline)
            - Honshu island
              - Kyoto Prefecture
                - Greater Kyoto
- Time zone(s):
  - Japan Standard Time (UTC+09)

=== Environment of Kyoto ===
- Climate of Kyoto

==== Natural geographic features of Kyoto ====
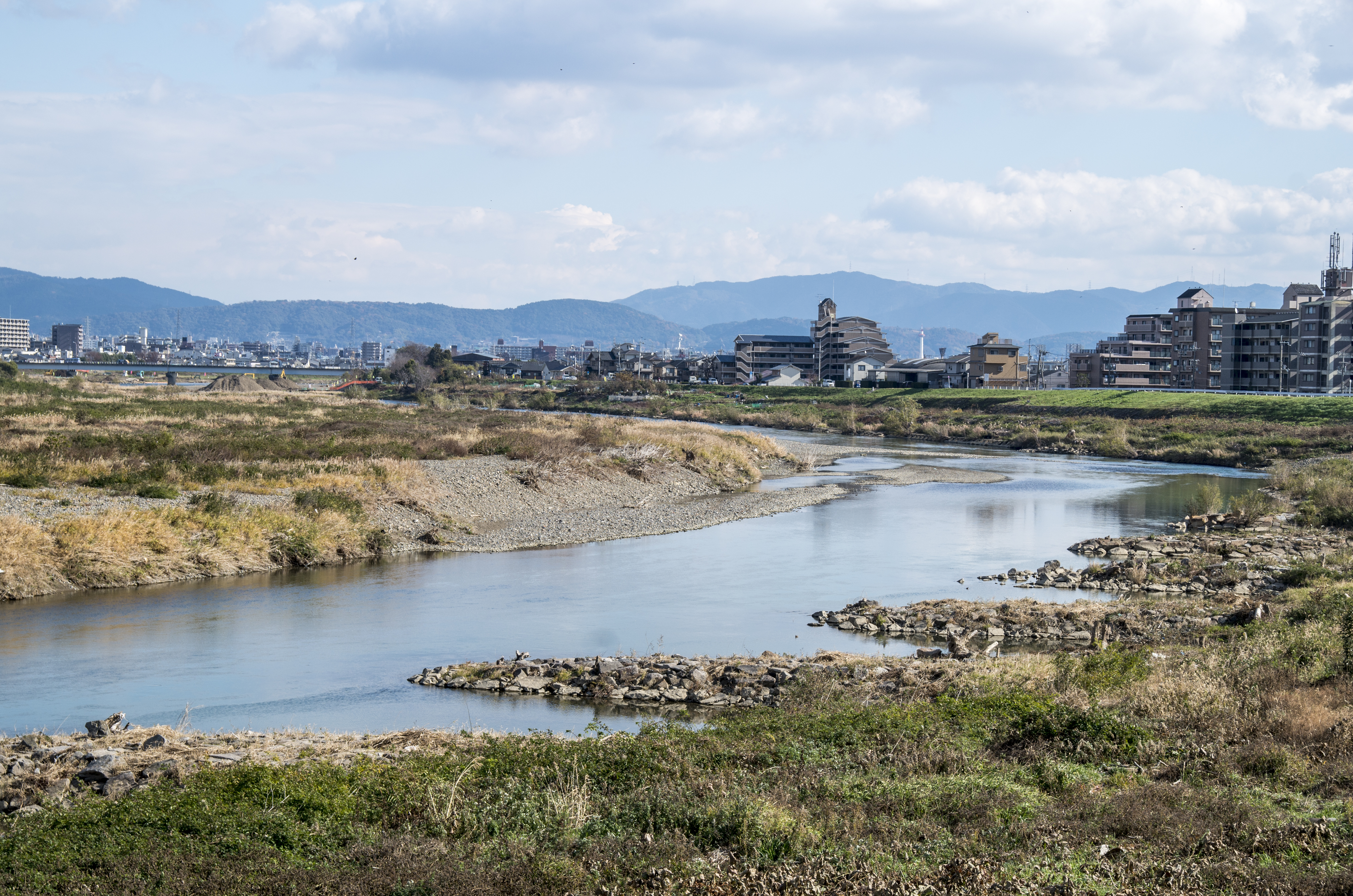
Katsura River near Nishikyō-ku district

- Canals in Kyoto
  - Takase River
- Mountains in Kyoto
  - Mount Hiei
- Rivers in Kyoto
  - Kamo River
  - Katsura River
  - Uji River

=== Areas of Kyoto ===
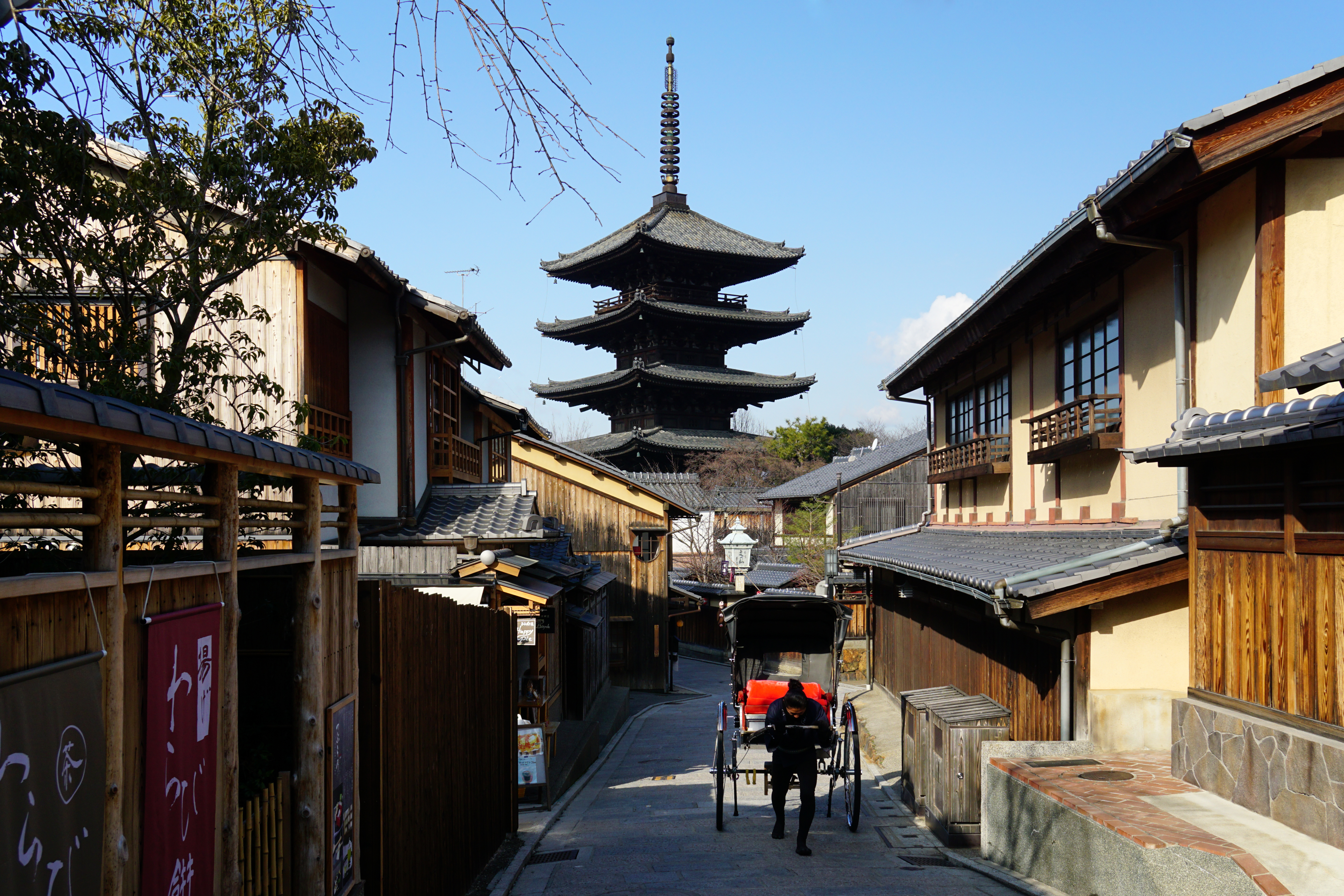
Street in the Higashiyama-ku district with the Yasaka-no-to Pagoda in the background

==== Districts of Kyoto ====
- Arashiyama
- Gion
- Kamishichiken
- Nishijin
- Shijō Kawaramachi

==== Neighborhoods in Kyoto ====
- Katsura

=== Locations in Kyoto ===
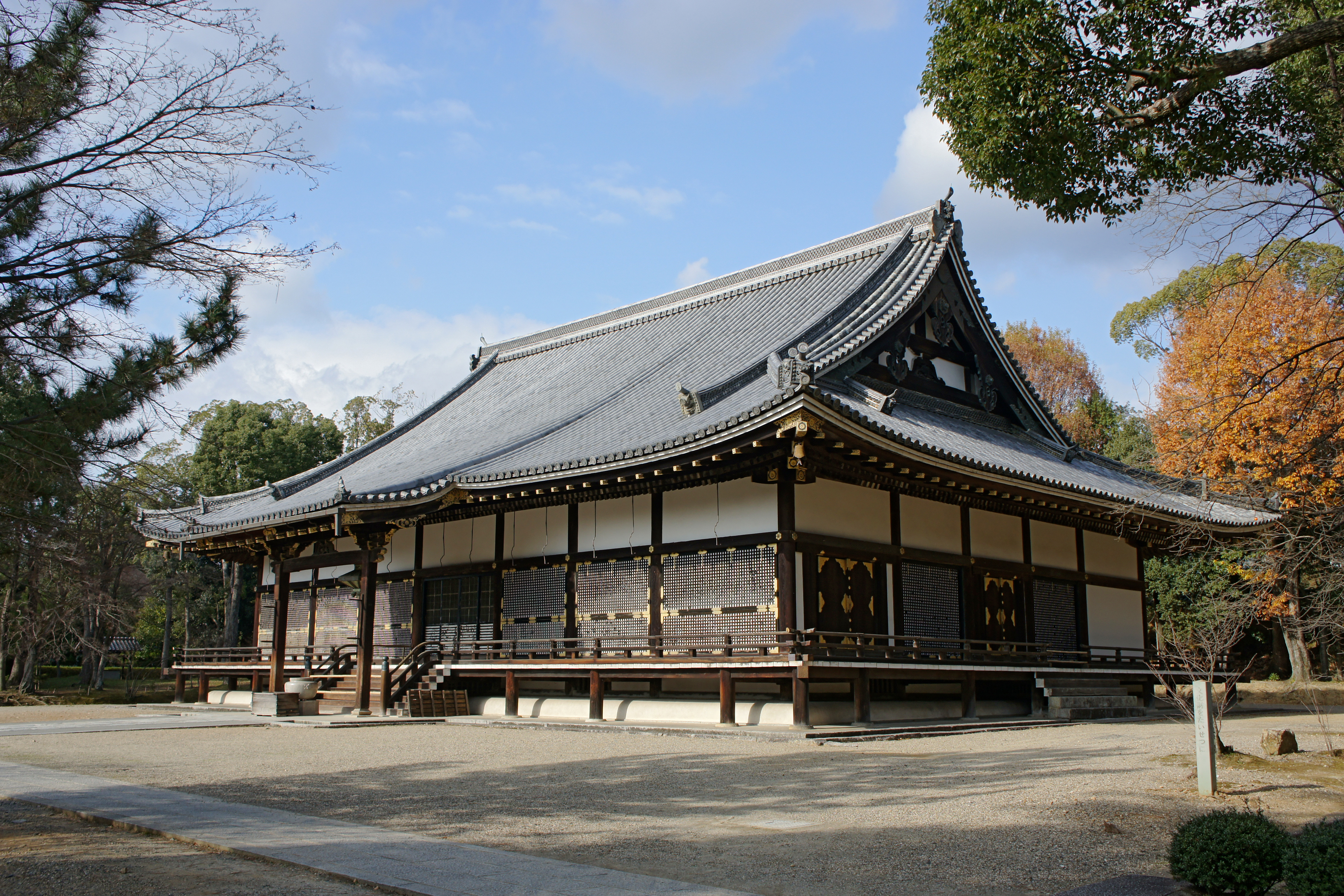
Ninna-ji's Golden Hall, registered as part of the UNESCO World Heritage Site Historic monuments of Ancient Kyoto

- Tourist attractions in Kyoto
  - Museums in Kyoto
  - Shopping areas and markets
  - Thirteen Buddhist Sites of Kyoto
  - World Heritage Sites in Kyoto
    - Historic Monuments of Ancient Kyoto

==== Bridges in Kyoto ====
Bridges in Kyoto

- Sanjō Ōhashi

==== Cultural and exhibition centers in Kyoto ====
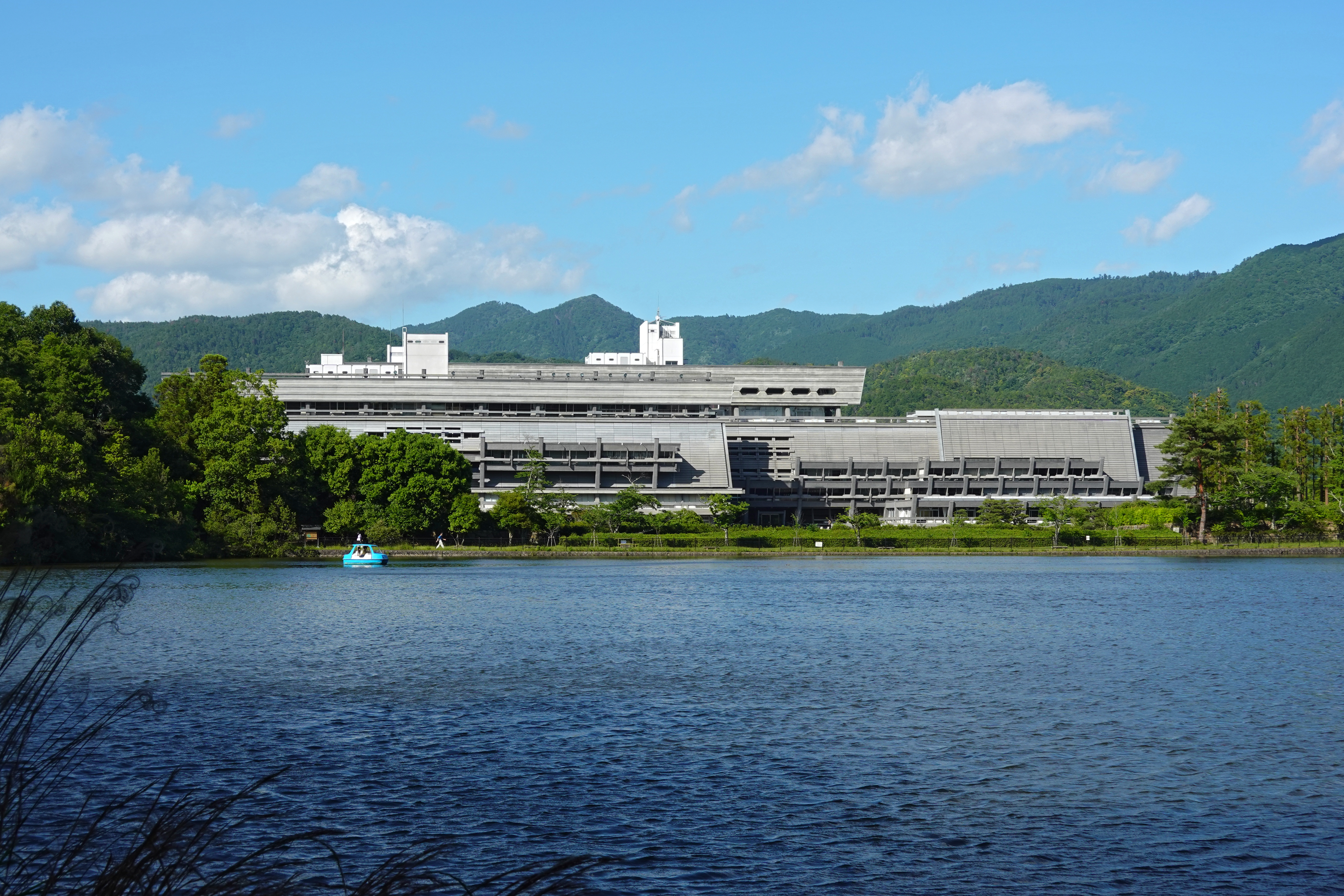
Kyoto International Conference Center

- Kyoto International Conference Center

==== Monuments and memorials in Kyoto ====
- Mimizuka
- Ryozen Kannon

==== Museums and art galleries in Kyoto ====
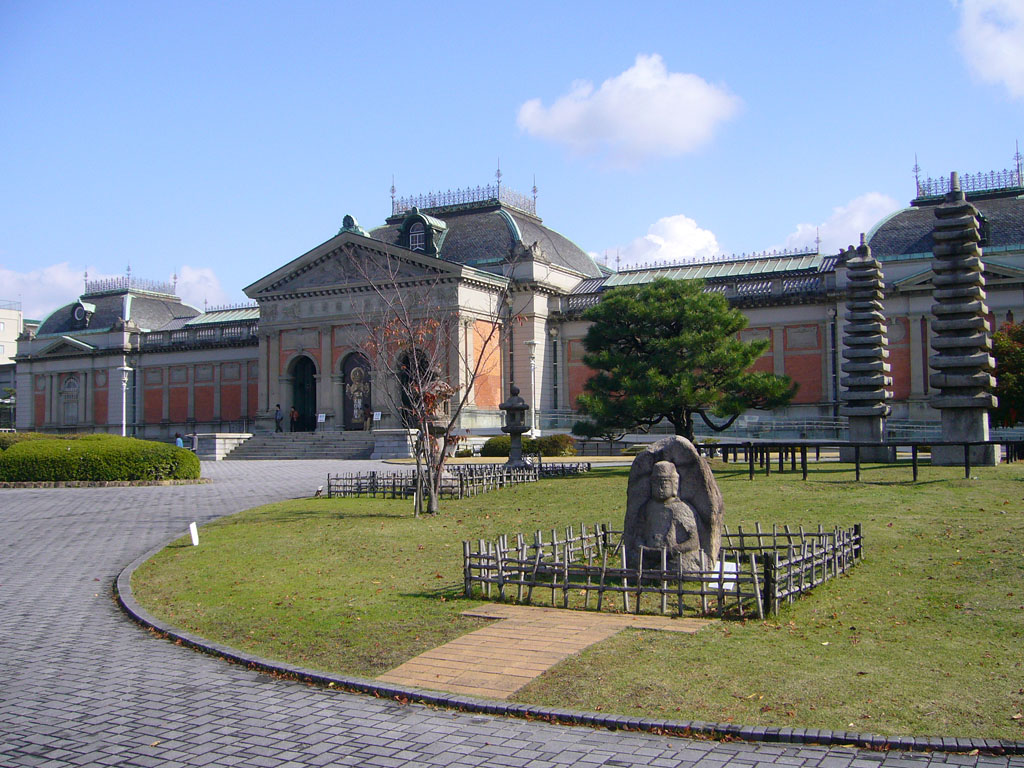
Kyoto National Museum

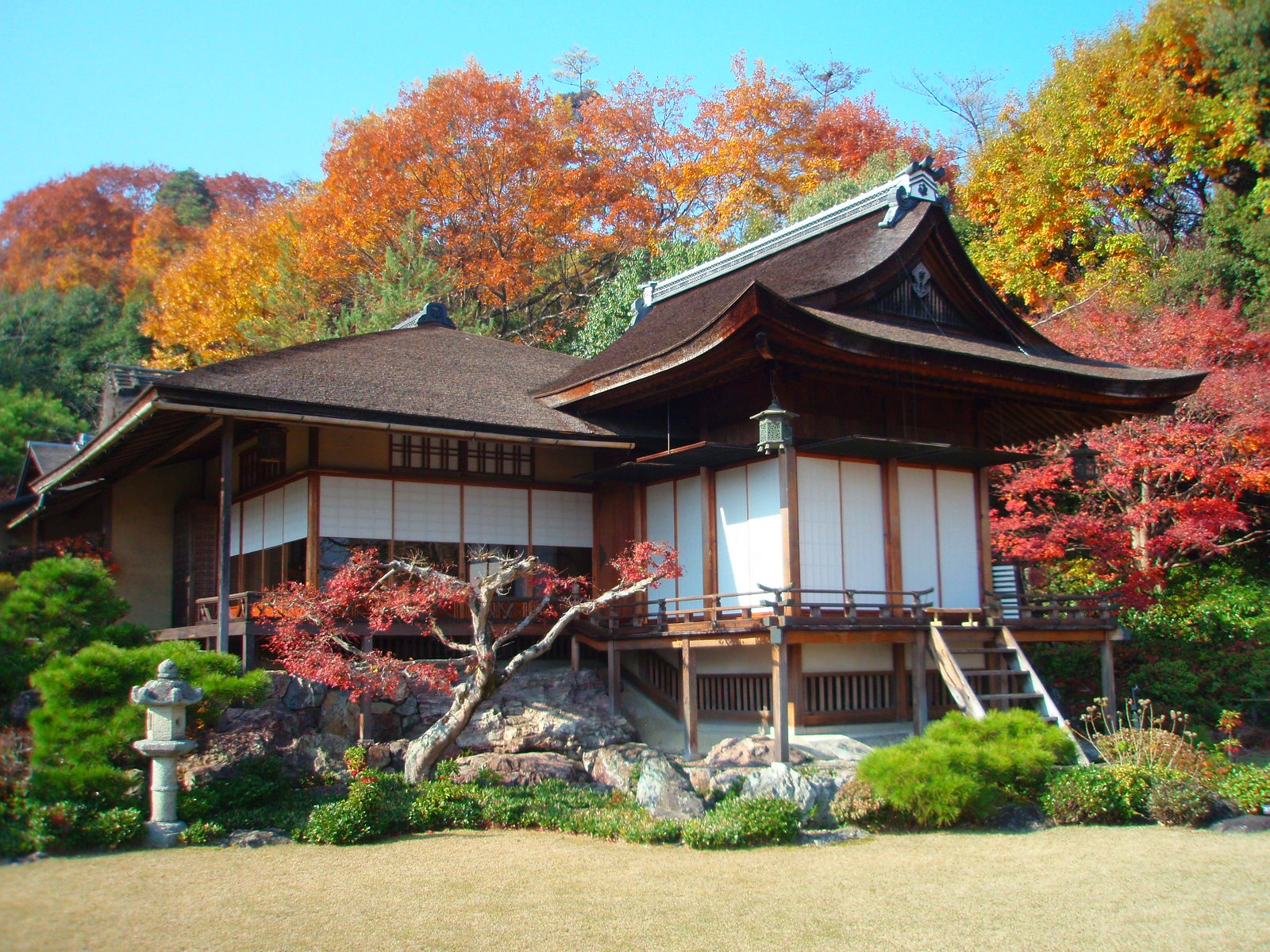
The Daijōkaku at Ōkōchi Sansō

Museums in Kyoto

- Hosomi Museum
- Kitamura Museum
- Koryo Museum of Art
- Kyoto Art Center
- Kyoto City Archaeological Museum
- Kyoto City Library of Historical Documents
- Kyoto International Manga Museum
- Kyoto Municipal Museum of Art
- Kyoto Museum for World Peace
- Kyoto National Museum
- Kyoto Railway Museum
- Museum of Furuta Oribe
- National Museum of Modern Art
- Nomura Art Museum
- Ōkōchi Sansō
- Ōtani University Museum
- Ryozen Museum of History
- Sen-oku Hakuko Kan
- Shigureden
- Toei Kyoto Studio Park

==== Palaces and villas in Kyoto ====
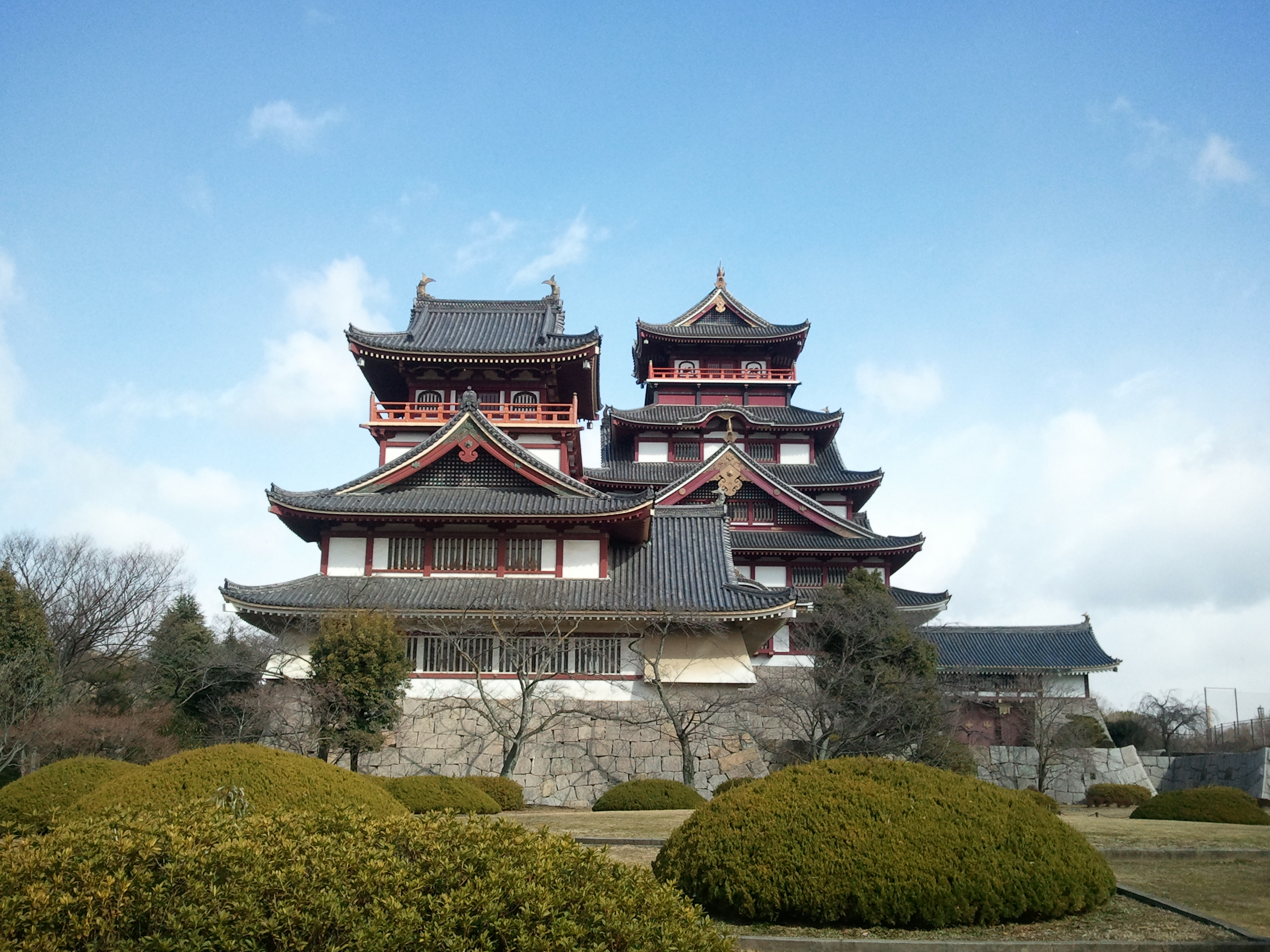
Fushimi Castle

- Fushimi Castle
  - Golden Tea Room
- Heian Palace
- Jurakudai
- Kyoto Imperial Palace
  - Chrysanthemum Throne
- Katsura Imperial Villa
- Nijō Castle
  - Nightingale floor

==== Parks and gardens in Kyoto ====
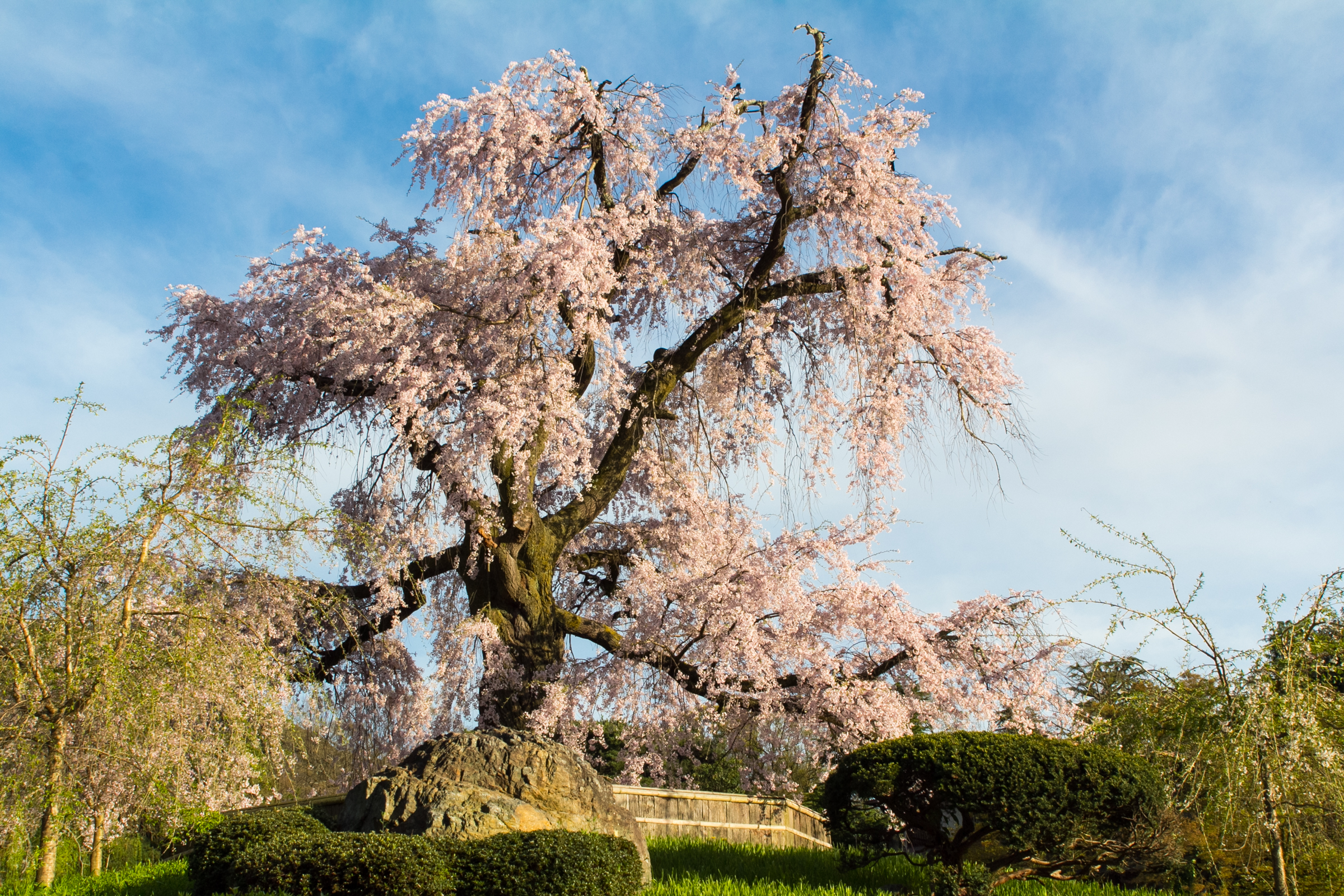
Maruyama ParkPark

- Bamboo Forest
- Iwatayama Monkey Park
- Kyoto Botanical Garden
- Kyoto Gyoen National Garden
- Maruyama Park
- Murin-an
- Sentō Imperial Palace
- Shugakuin Imperial Villa
- Toei Kyoto Studio Park

==== Religious buildings in Kyoto ====
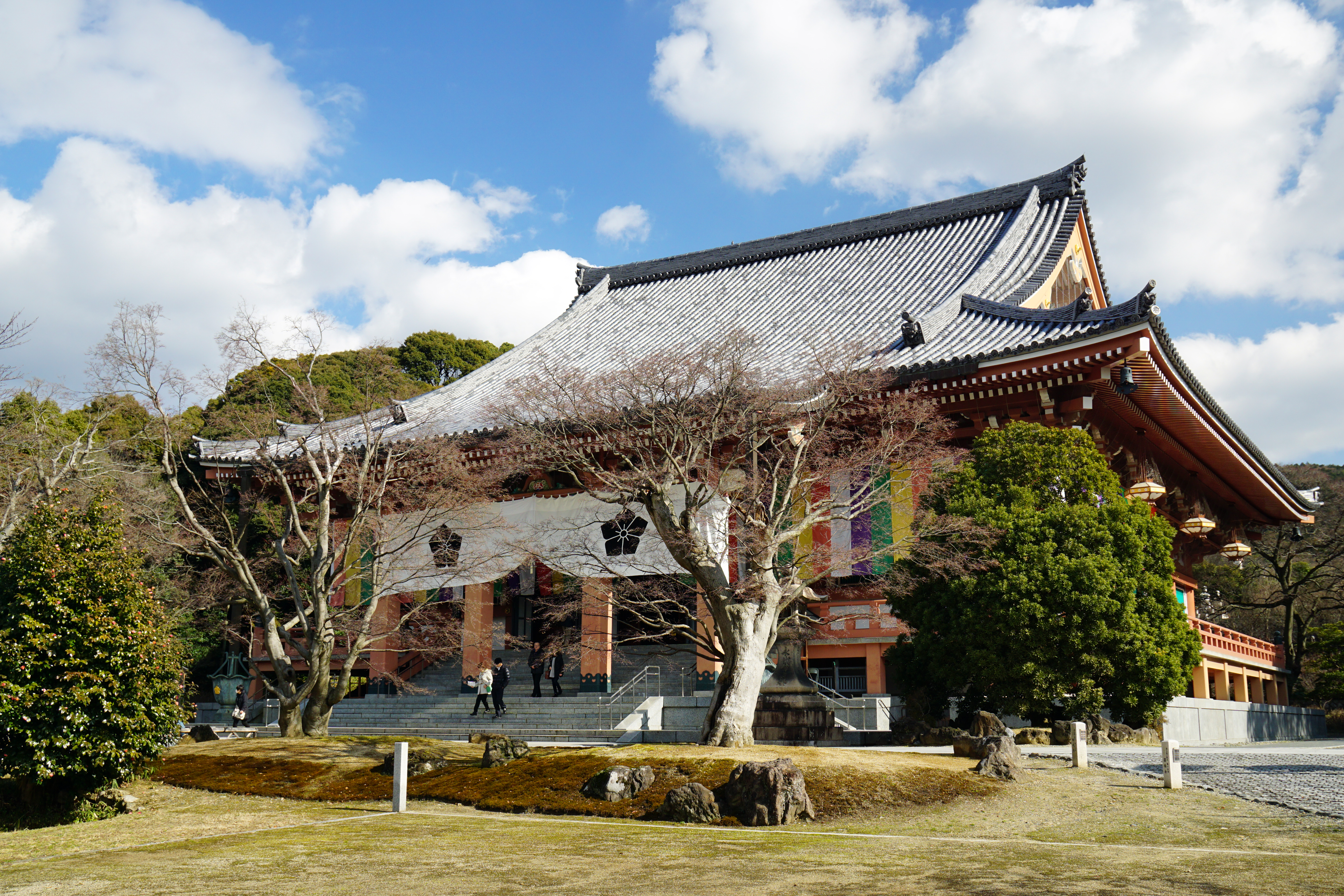
The main hall of Chishaku-in

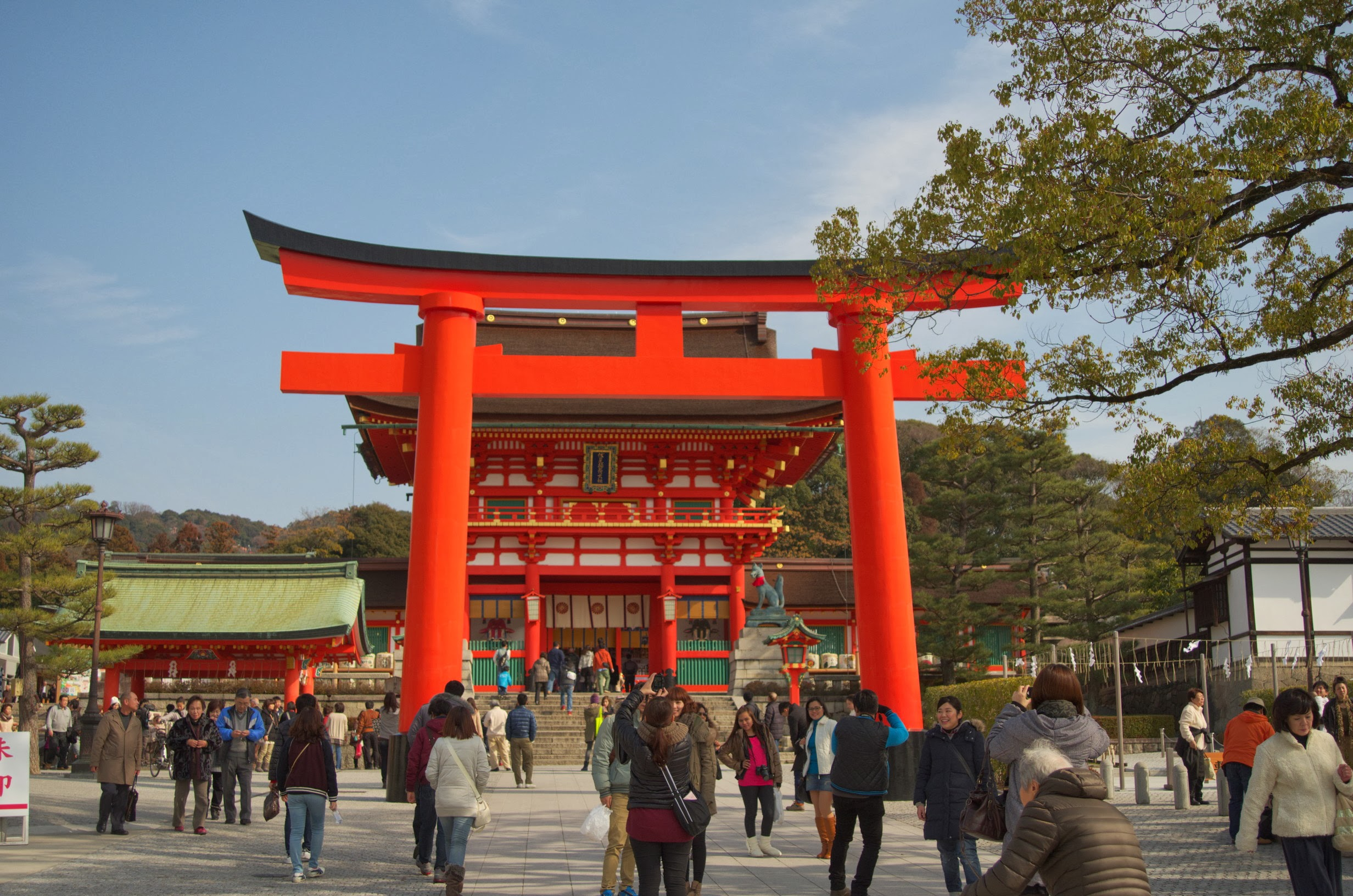
Fushimi Inari-taisha

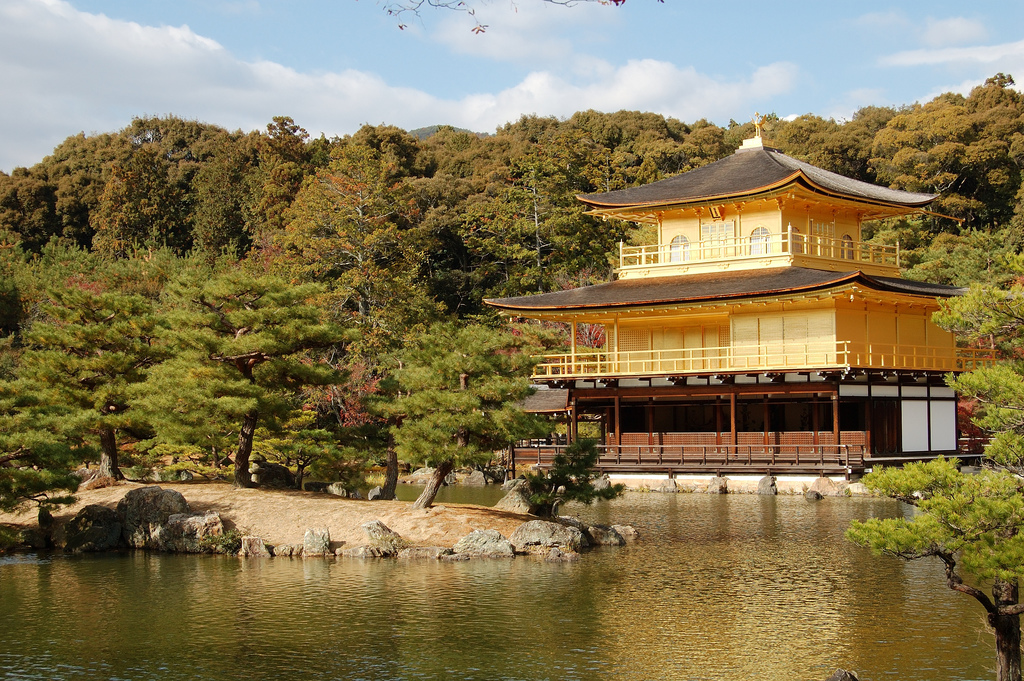
Kinkaku-ji

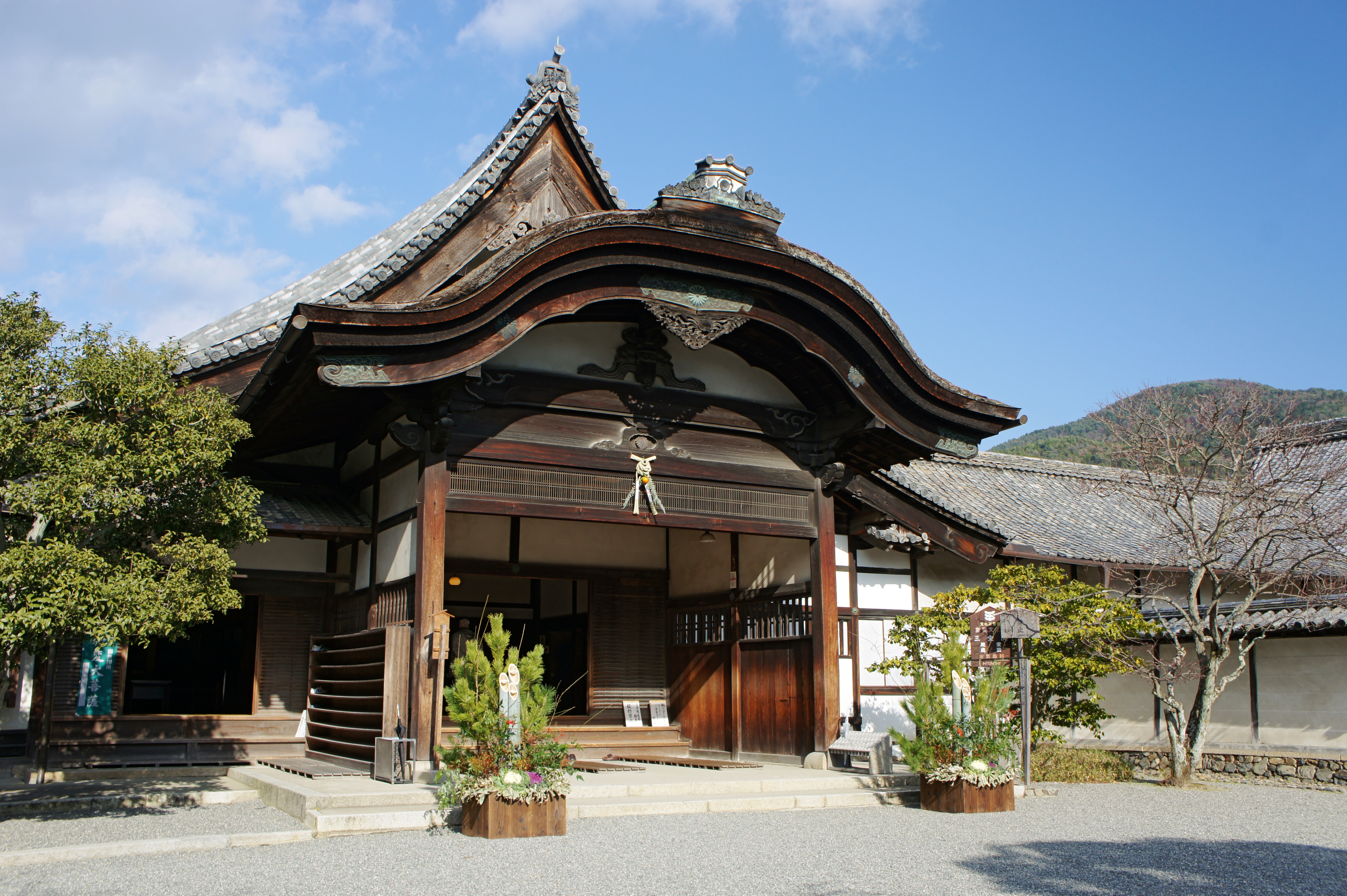
Sanbō-in

Buddhist temples and Shinto shrines in Kyoto

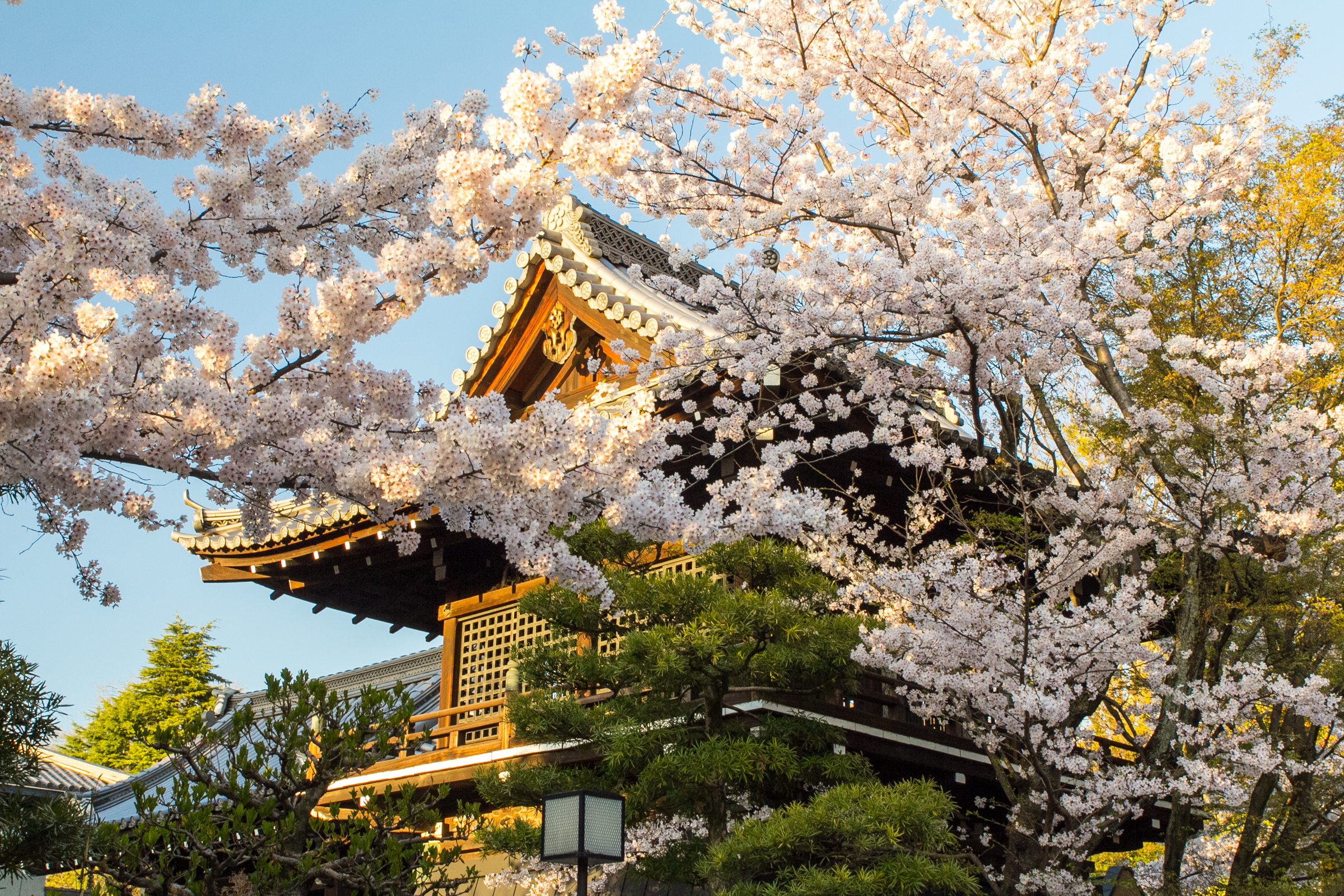
Sakura at the Daiun-in temple

- Anrakuju-in
- Chishaku-in
- Daigo-ji
- Daikaku-ji
- Daisen-in
- Fushimi Inari-taisha
- Ginkaku-ji
- Heian Shrine
- Kamigamo Shrine
- Kamo Shrine
- Kinkaku-ji
- Kitano Tenmangū
- Kiyomizu-dera
- Kōzan-ji
- Matsunoo-taisha
- Nishi Hongan-ji
- Ryōan-ji
- Saihō-ji
- Sanbō-in
- Tenryū-ji
- Tō-ji

==== Secular buildings in Kyoto ====
- Funaoka Onsen
- Ichiriki Chaya
- Kyoto Prefectural Library

==== Streets in Kyoto ====
- Karasuma Street
- Kawaramachi Street
- Kiyamachi Street
- Philosopher's Walk
- Shijō Street
- Teramachi Street

==== Theatres in Kyoto ====
- Minami-za

==== Towers in Kyoto ====
- Kyoto Tower

=== Demographics of Kyoto ===
Demographics of Kyoto

== Government and politics of Kyoto ==
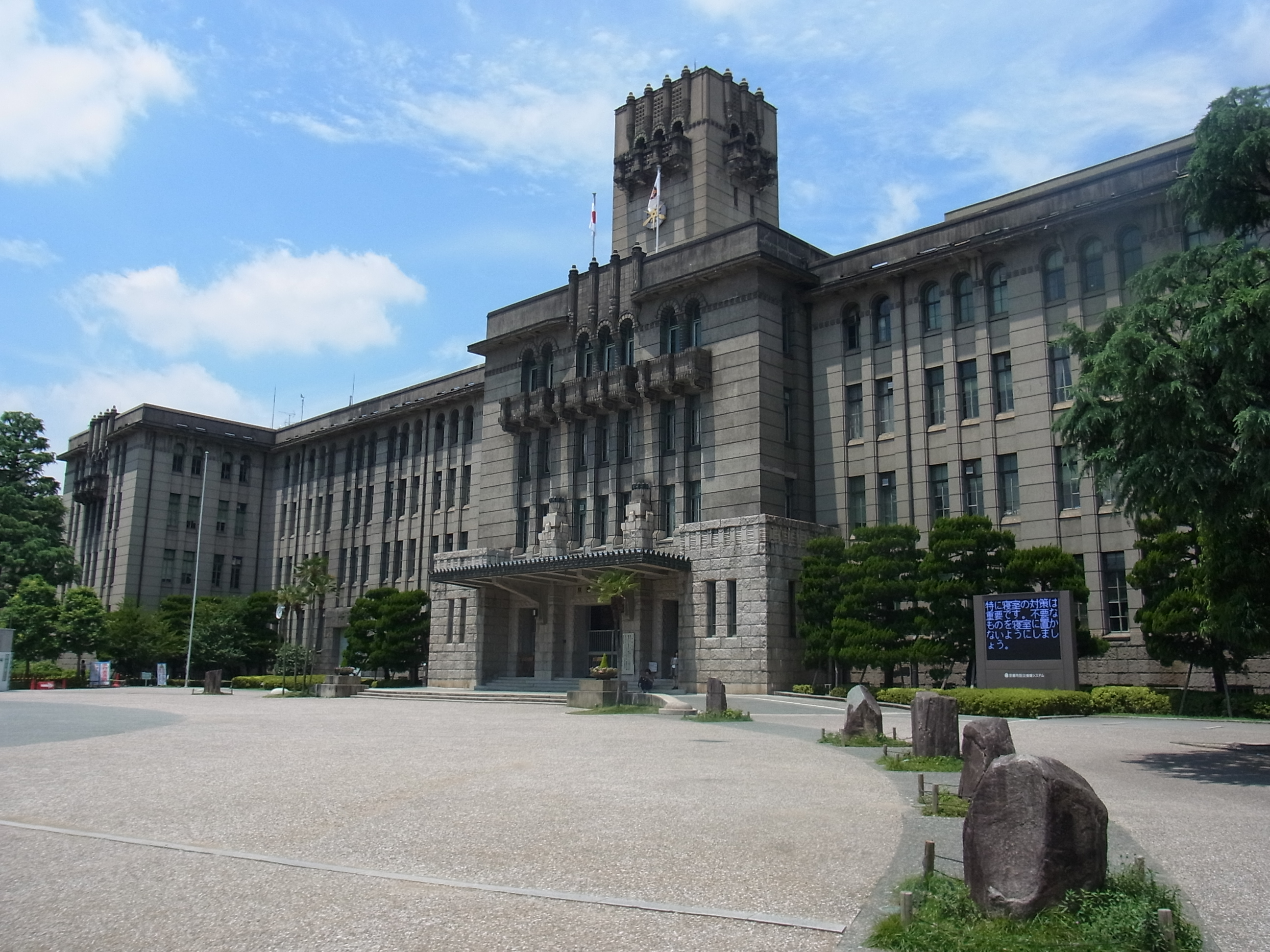
The Kyoto City Hall

Government and politics of Kyoto

- Wards of Kyoto
- Mayors of Kyoto
  - 2008 Kyoto mayoral election
  - 2012 Kyoto mayoral election
- International relations of Kyoto
  - Sister cities of Kyoto
    - Boston, Massachusetts, United States (1959)
    - Cologne, Germany (1963)
    - Florence, Italy (1965)
    - Kyiv, Ukraine (1971)
    - Prague, Czech Republic (1996)

== History of Kyoto ==
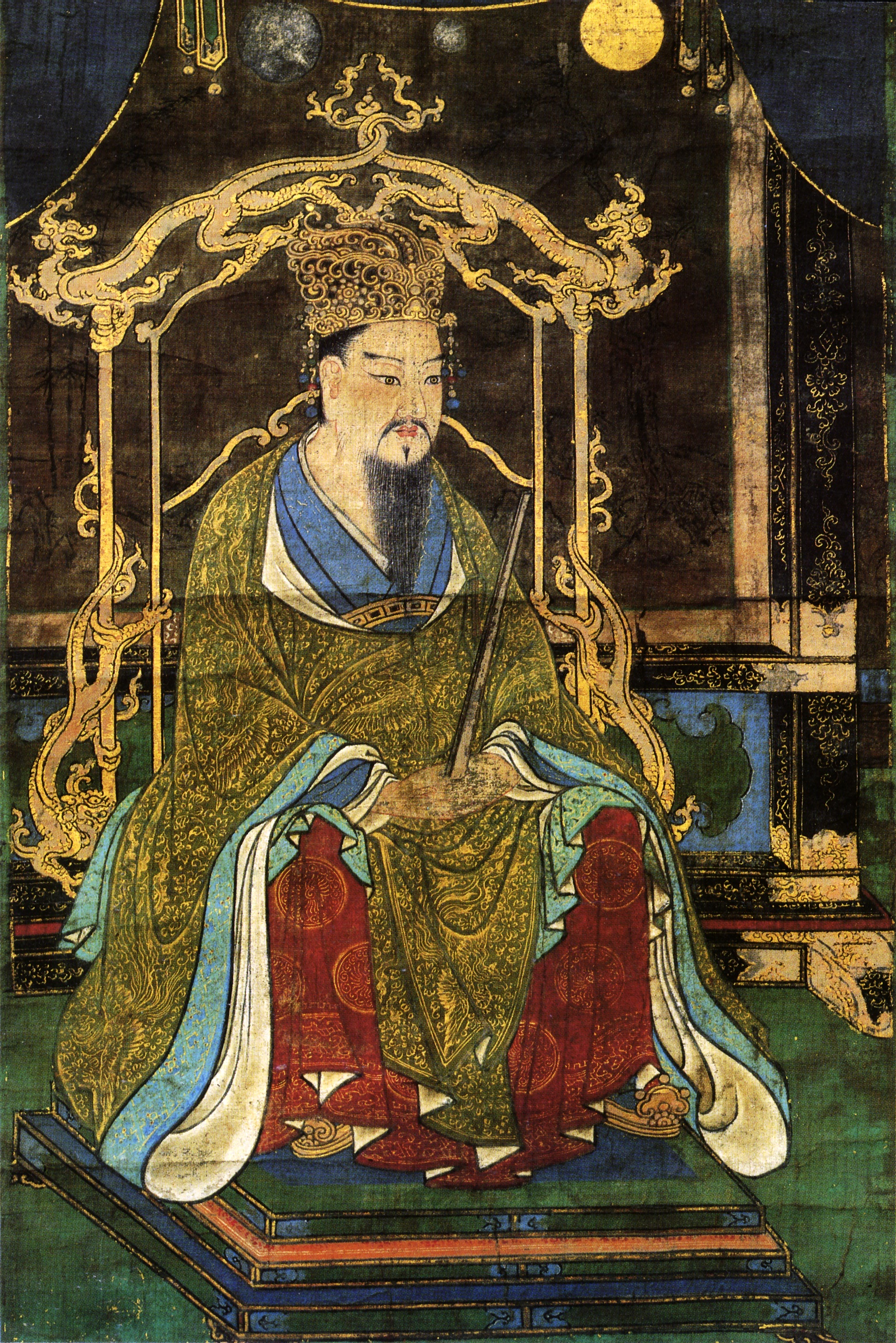
Emperor Kanmu, who relocated the capital to Heian-kyō in 794, moving the Imperial Court there from nearby Nagaoka-kyō

History of Kyoto

=== History of Kyoto, by period or event ===
Timeline of Kyoto

- Early history
- Kyoto during the Middle Ages – Kyoto becomes the official capital of Japan (794)
  - Imperial Court in Kyoto (794–1868)
- Modern Kyoto

== Culture of Kyoto ==
Culture of Kyoto

=== Arts in Kyoto ===
==== Music of Kyoto ====
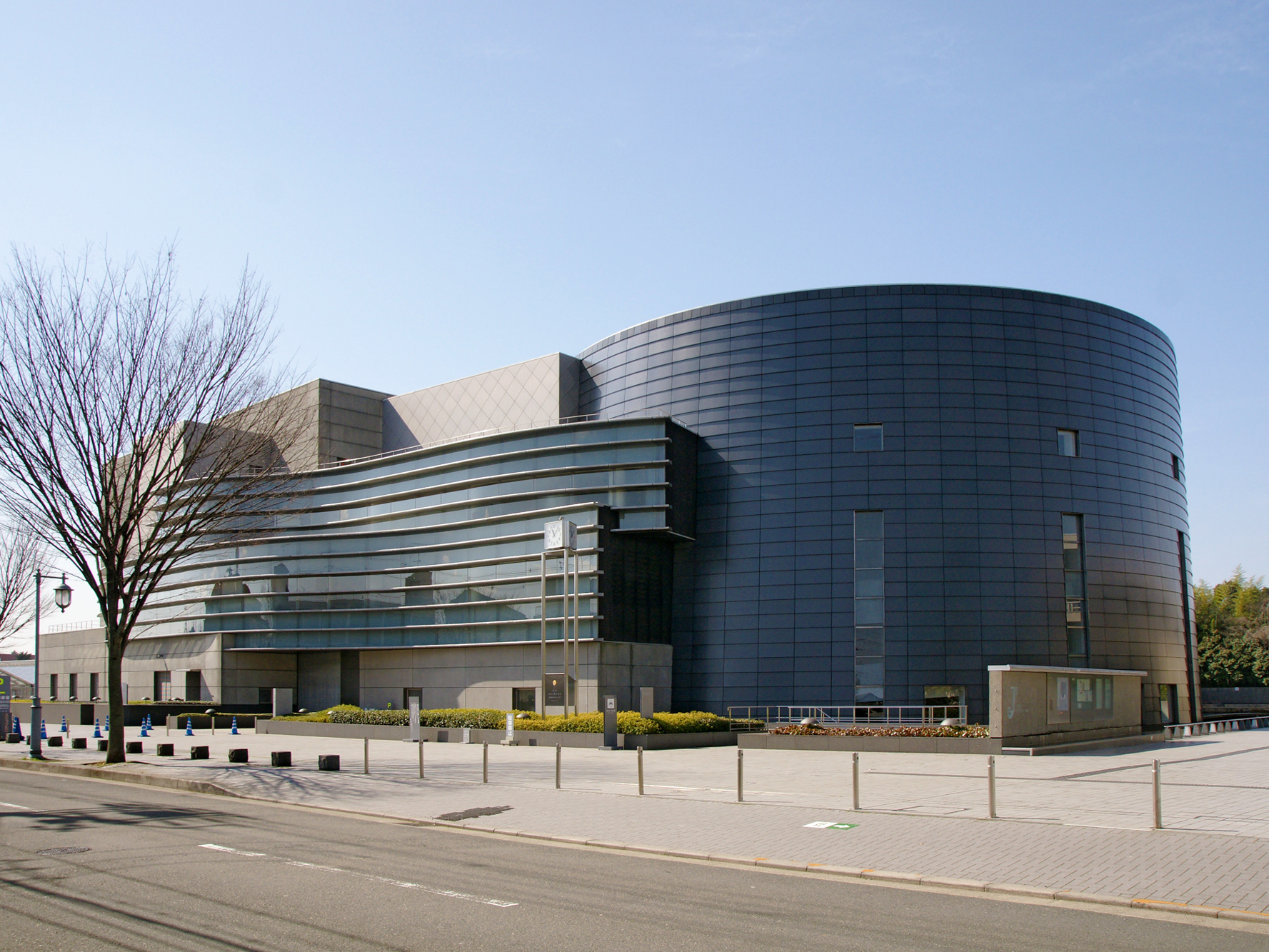
The Kyoto Concert Hall

- Composers and musicians of Kyoto
  - Teizo Matsumura
- Music venues in Kyoto
  - Kyoto Concert Hall
  - ROHM Theatre Kyoto

==== Visual arts of Kyoto ====
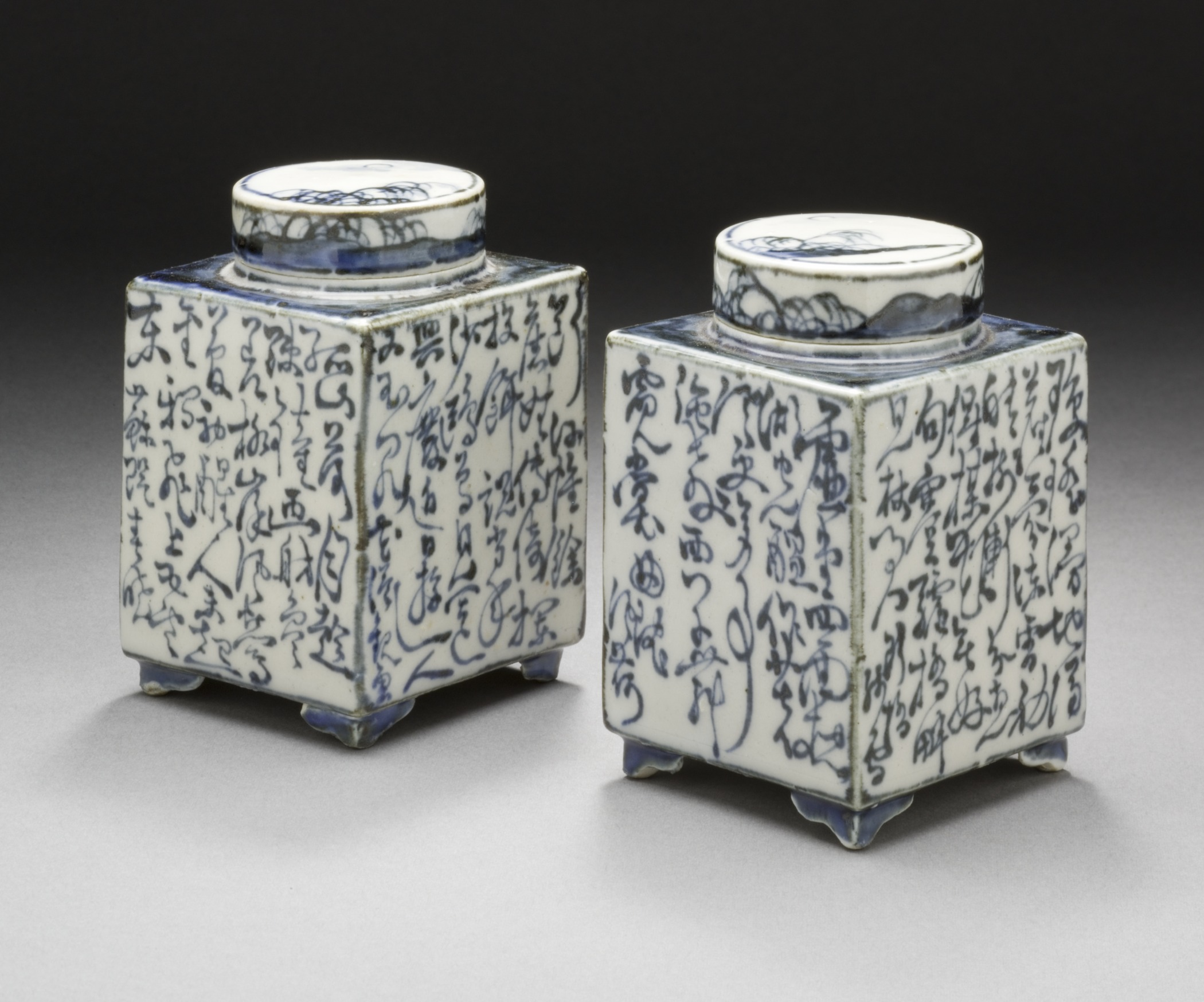
Kyoto ware, Pair of Tea Jars with Poetic Inscriptions, Los Angeles County Museum of Art

- Hara school of painters
- Kyoto school
- Kyoto ware
  - Awata ware
  - Kiyomizu ware

Cuisine of Kyoto

- Obanzai
- Yatsuhashi

Events in Kyoto

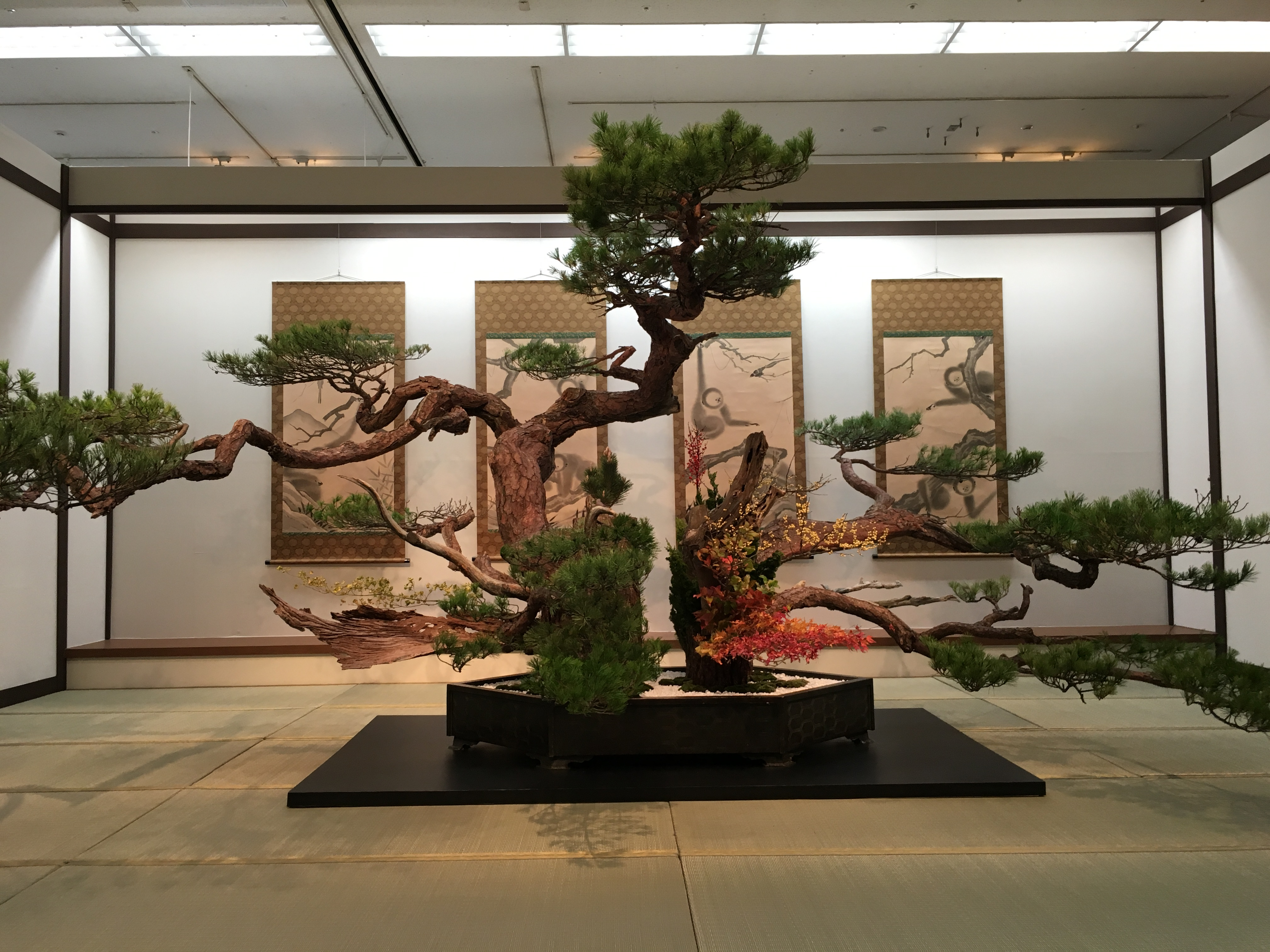
Sunanomono arrangement at the Ikenobo Autumn Tanabata Exhibition

- Ikenobo Autumn Tanabata Exhibition
- Kyoto Hemp Forum

Festivals in Kyoto

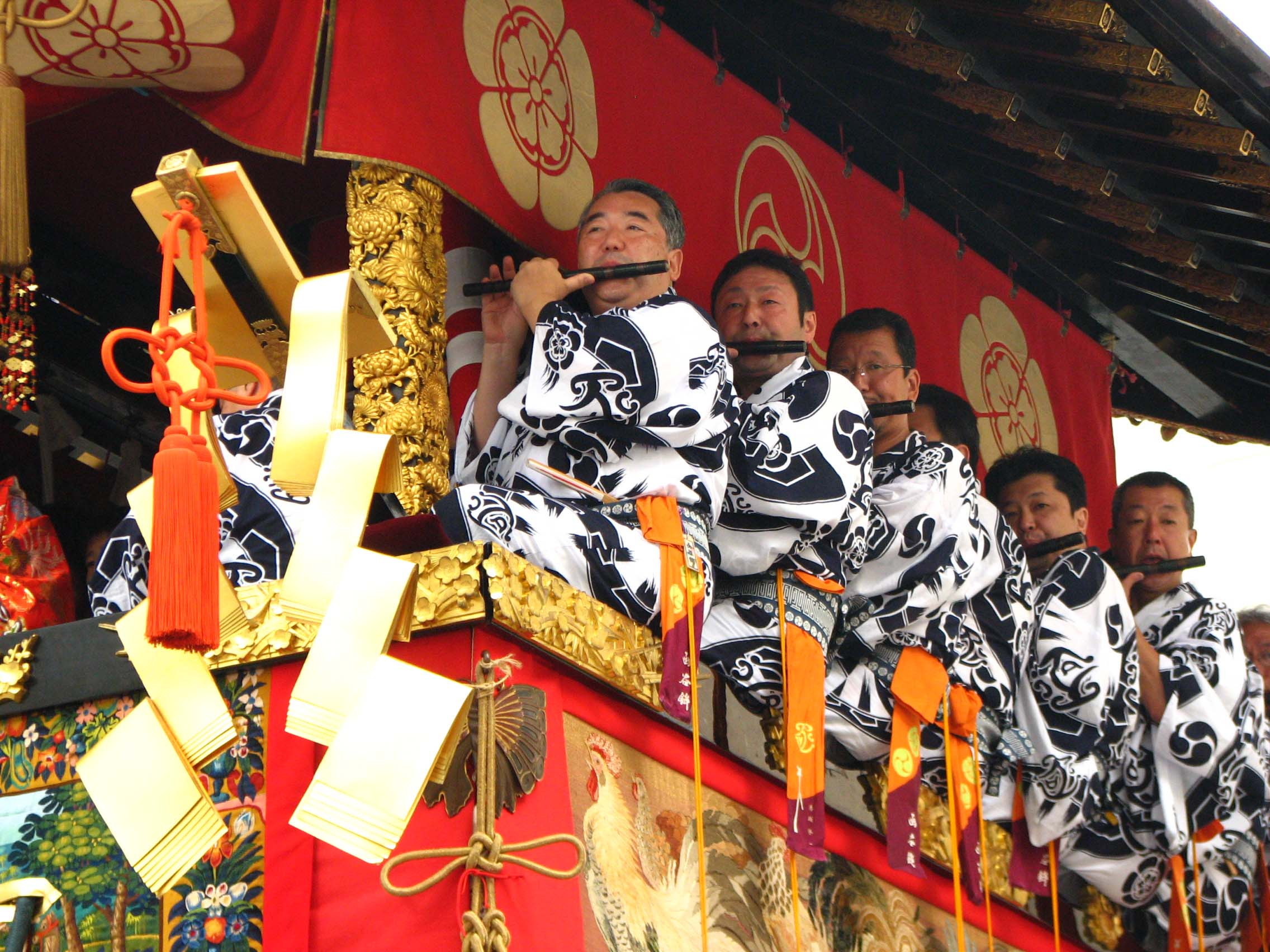
Kankoboko float at the 2007 Gion Matsuri festival

- Aoi Matsuri
- Gion Matsuri
- Gozan no Okuribi
- Jidai Matsuri

Languages of Kyoto

- Kansai dialect

Media in Kyoto

- Newspapers in Kyoto
  - Kyoto Journal
  - Kyoto Shimbun
- Radio and television in Kyoto
  - Kyoto Broadcasting System

==== Philosophy of Kyoto ====
- Kyoto School

=== Religion in Kyoto ===
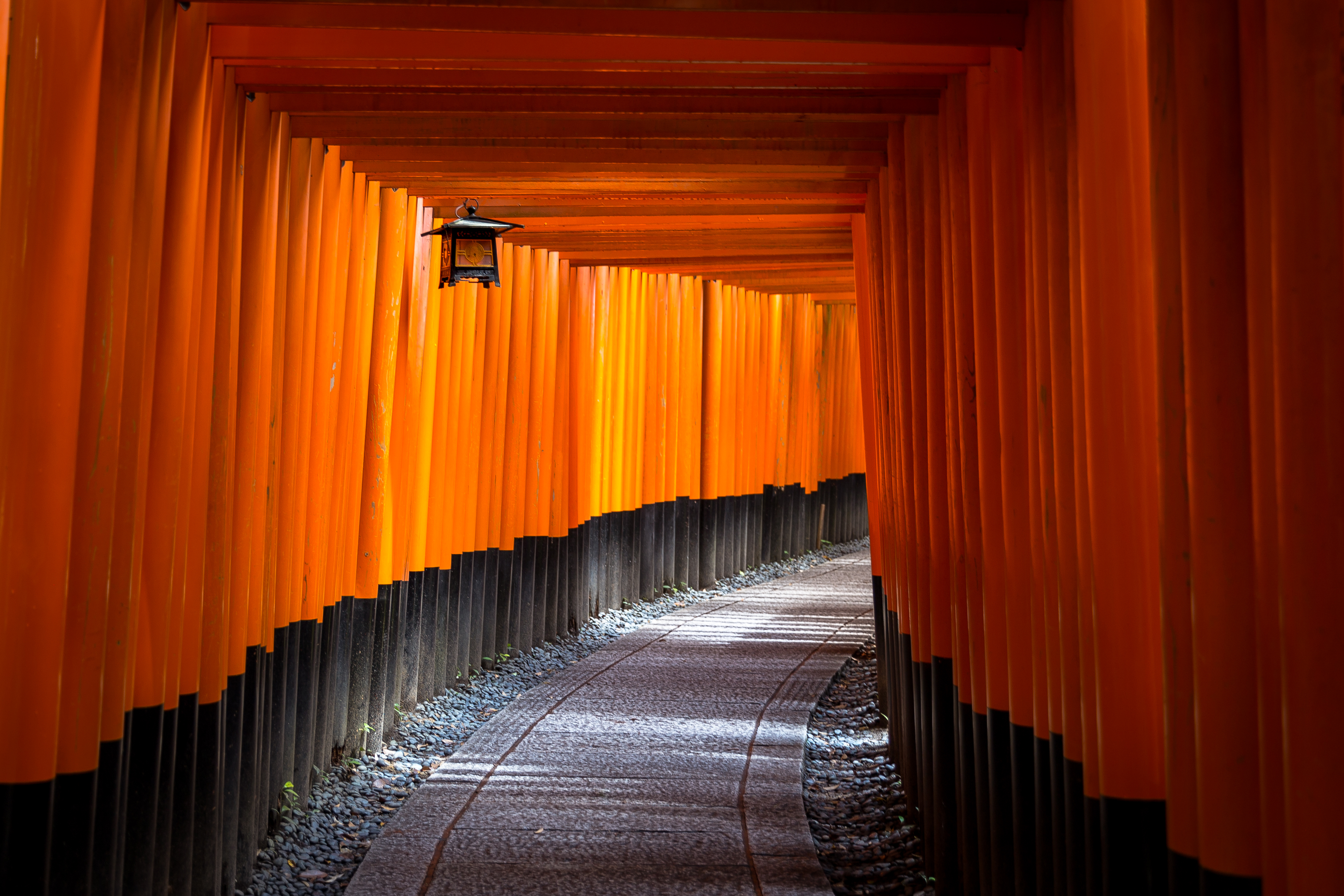
Torii at the Fushimi Inari-taisha

Religion in Kyoto

- Buddhism in Kyoto
- Christianity in Kyoto
  - St. Agnes Cathedral
  - Catholicism in Kyoto
    - Roman Catholic Diocese of Kyoto
      - St. Francis Xavier Cathedral
- Shinto in Kyoto

=== Sports in Kyoto ===
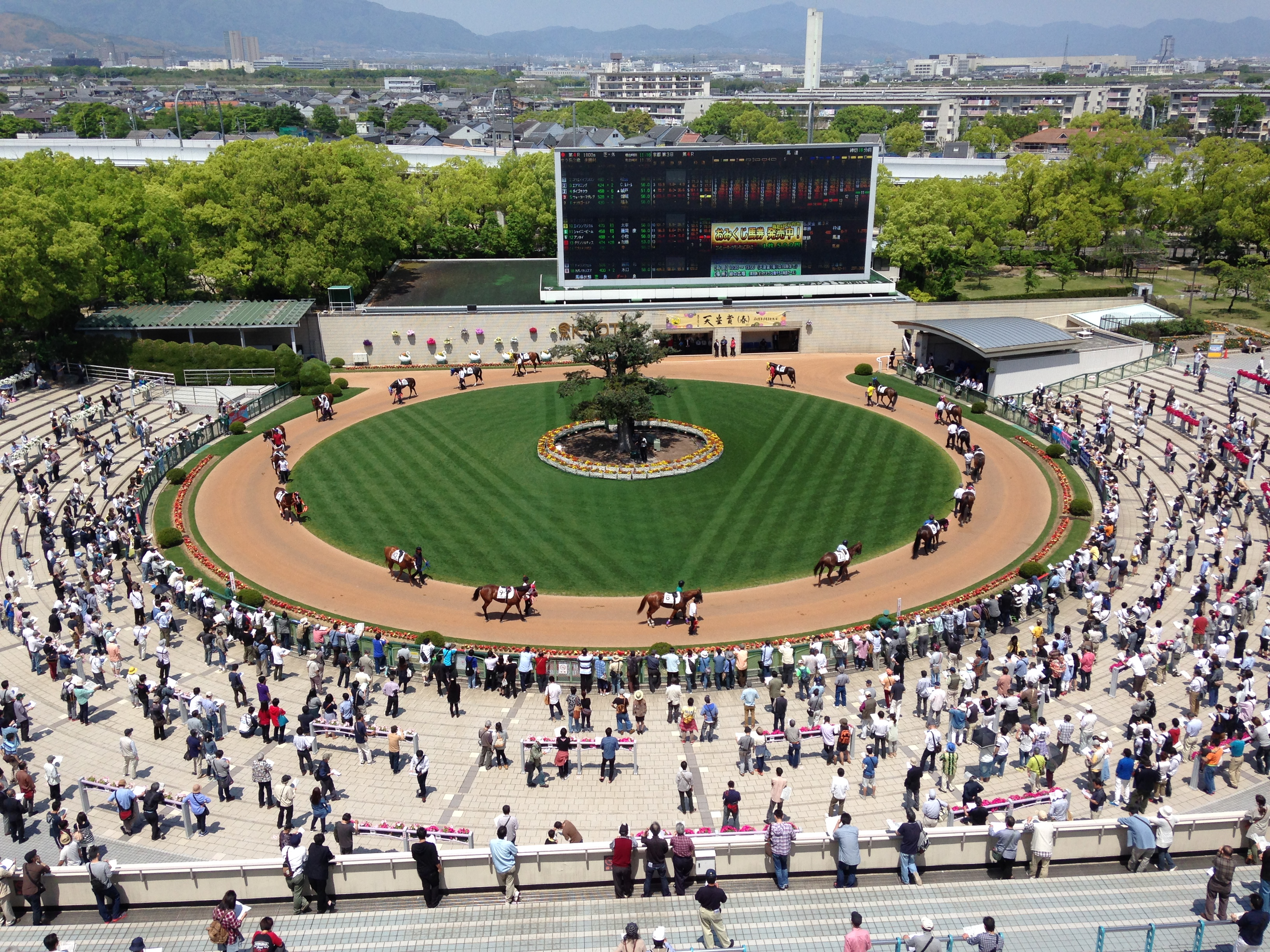
Paddocks at Kyoto Racecourse

Sports in Kyoto

- Baseball in Kyoto
  - Shochiku Robins
- Football in Kyoto
  - Association football in Kyoto
    - Kyoto Sanga FC
- Sports competitions in Kyoto
  - Kyoto Marathon
  - Shimadzu All Japan Indoor Tennis Championships
- Sports venues in Kyoto
  - Kyoto Racecourse
  - Nishikyogoku Athletic Stadium

== Economy and infrastructure of Kyoto ==
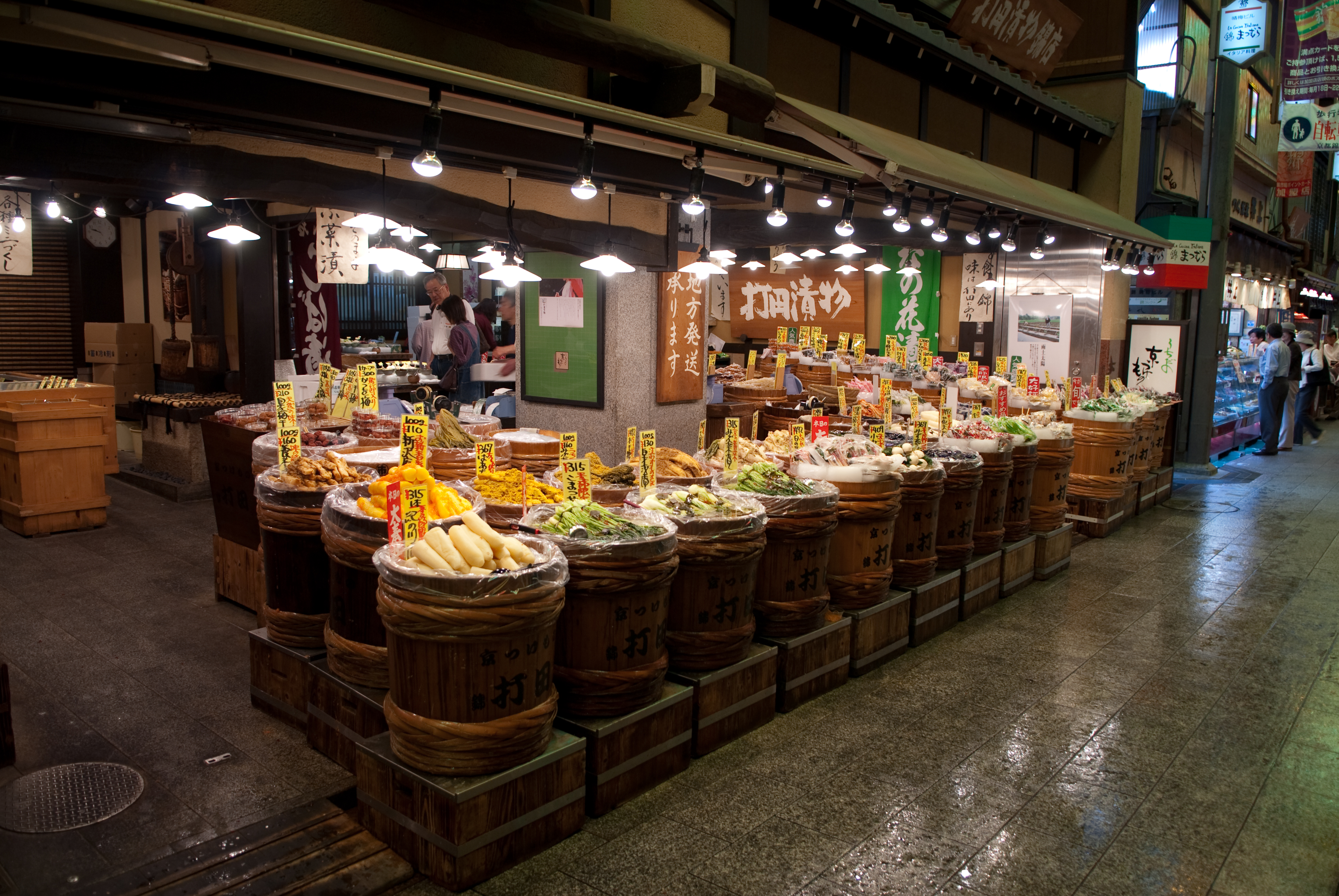
The Nishiki Market

Economy of Kyoto

- Financial services in Kyoto
  - Bank of Kyoto
- Hotels in Kyoto
- Restaurants and cafés in Kyoto
  - Salon de thé François
  - Tai-an
- Shopping malls and markets in Kyoto
  - Æon Mall Kyoto Gojō
  - Nishiki Market
- Tourism in Kyoto

=== Transportation in Kyoto ===
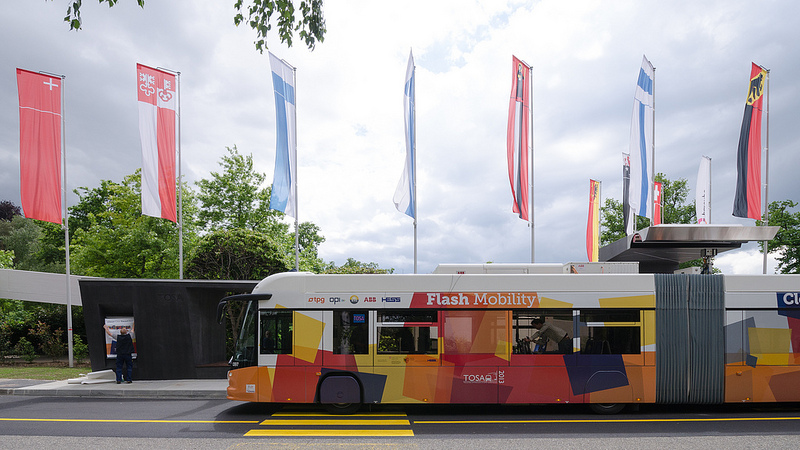
Articulated TOSA bus

Public transport in Kyoto

- Public transport operators in Kyoto
  - Kyoto Municipal Transportation Bureau
- Air transport in Kyoto
  - Airports in Kyoto
- Road transport in Kyoto
  - Bus transport in Kyoto
    - TOSA Flash Mobility, Clean City, Smart Bus
  - Cycling in Kyoto

==== Rail transport in Kyoto ====
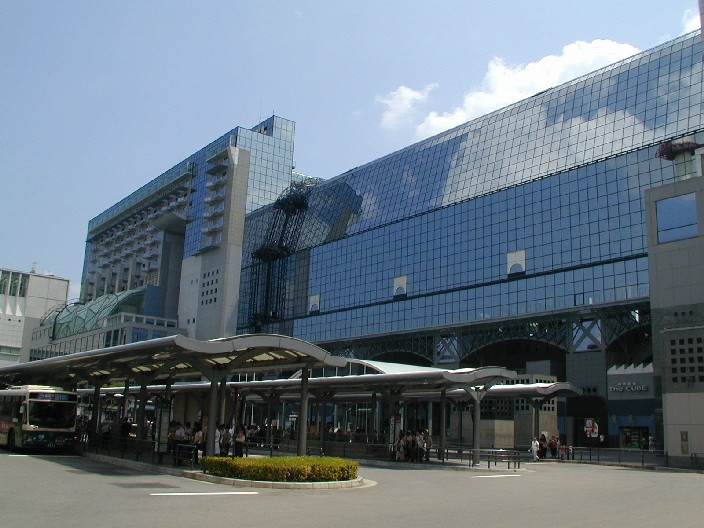
Kyoto railway station

Rail transport in Kyoto

- Kyoto Municipal Subway
  - Karasuma Line
  - Tōzai Line
- Railway stations in Kyoyo
  - Kyōto Station
  - Ōmiya Station
  - Sanjō Station

== Education in Kyoto ==
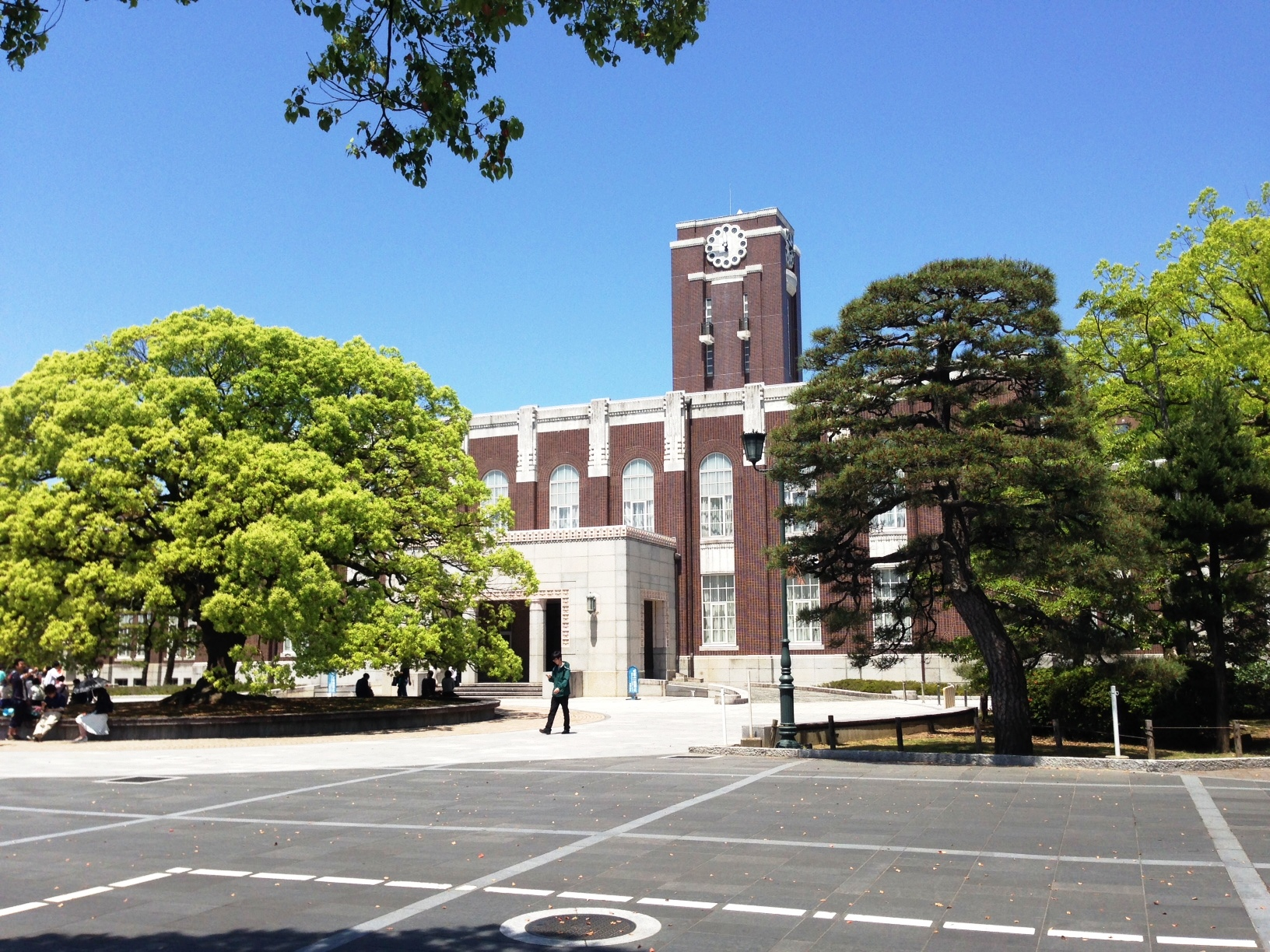
Kyoto University Clock Tower Centennial Hall

Education in Kyoto

- Universities in Kyoto
  - Doshisha University
  - Kyoto Institute of Technology
  - Kyoto University
  - Kyoto City University of Arts
  - Ryukoku University
- Research institutes in Kyoto
  - International Research Center for Japanese Studies
  - Yamashina Botanical Research Institute

== See also ==
- Outline of geography
