= Timeline of Kyoto =

Coordinates: 35.011667°N 135.768333°E

The following is a timeline of the history of the city of Kyoto, Kyoto Prefecture, Honshu island, Japan.

== Prior to 19th century ==
- 794 CE - Kanmu relocates Japanese capital to Heian-kyō from Nagaoka-kyō.
- 947 - Kitano Shrine built.
- 970 - Gion Festival begins.
- 1202 - Zen Buddhist Kennin-ji (temple) founded in Higashiyama by Eisai.
- 1319 - Daitoku-ji Temple built.
- 1397 - Kinkaku-ji (Temple of the Golden Pavilion) founded.
- 1431 - Famine.
- 1444 - Political protest by merchants, at Kitano Shrine.
- 1467 - Ōnin War begins.
- 1480 - Ikkō-ikki unrest.
- 1560 - Aritsugu swordsmith in business.
- 1586
  - Jurakudai (palace) built.
  - Hōkō-ji (temple) founded.
  - Tenshō earthquake brings destruction and kills many.
- 1788 - Great Kyoto Fire.

== 19th century ==
- 1854 - Kyoto Imperial Palace rebuilt.
- 1869 - Japanese imperial capital relocated from Kyoto to Tokyo.
- 1871
  - Tokyo-Osaka-Kyoto postal service begins.
  - Kyoto Prefecture created.
- 1872 - Exhibition of Arts and Manufactures held.
- 1875 - Protestant Doshisha English School established.
- 1877 - Kyōto Station opens.
- 1879 - Kamigyō-ku and Shimogyō-ku ward established.
- 1886 - Maruyama Park opens.
- 1887 - Population: 264,559.
- 1888 - Takocho (eatery) in business.
- 1890 - Lake Biwa Canal built.
- 1893 - Population: 317,270.
- 1895
  - Kyoto Electric Railway begins operating.
  - National Industrial Exposition (Japan) held in Kyoto; Heian Shrine built.
- 1897
  - Imperial University of Kyoto established.
  - Chūgai Nippō religious newspaper begins publication.
- 1899 - Kyoto Camera Club formed.
- 1900 - Miyako Hotel in business.

== 20th century ==
- 1903
  - Kyoto Municipal Zoo established.
  - Population: 379,404.
- 1904 - Japan's first ekiben (boxed lunch) sold in Kyoto.
- 1909
  - Kyoto Commercial Museum opens.
  - Population: 442,402.
- 1913
  - Hirase Conchological Museum opens.
  - Population: 509,380.
- 1918 - Population: 670,357.
- 1921 - Higashiyama-ku ward created.
- 1922 - Kyoto Sanga Football Club formed.
- 1924 - Kyoto Botanical Garden established.
- 1925
  - December: Kyoto Gakuren incident occurs.
  - Population: 679,963.
- 1928 - Hirohito's imperial enthronement ceremony held in Kyoto.
- 1929
  - Nakagyō-ku and Sakyō-ku wards created.
  - City hosts Institute of Pacific Relations conference.
- 1930 - Population: 765,142
- 1931 - Fushimi-ku and Ukyō-ku wards created.
- 1934 - Salon de thé François (café) opens.
- 1940 - Population: 1,089,726.
- 1942
  - Kyoto Shimbun newspaper in publication.
  - Nishikyogoku Athletic Stadium opens.
- 1945 - Population: 866,153.
- 1946 - November: National Sports Festival of Japan held in Kyoto.
- 1950 - Population: 1,101,854.
- 1955 - Kita-ku and Minami-ku wards created.
- 1956 - Kyoto designated a government ordinance city.
- 1960
  - Kyoto Kaikan (concert hall) opens.
  - National Christian Council Center for the Study of Japanese Religions founded.
- 1964 - Kyoto Tower erected.
- 1969 - Kyoto Computer Gakuin (school) established.
- 1970 - October: Kyoto hosts World Conference of Religions for Peace.
- 1975 - Population: 1,460,000.
- 1976 - Nishikyō-ku and Yamashina-ku wards created.
- 1981 - Kyoto Municipal Subway begins operating.
- 1987 - City hosts World Conference of Historical Cities.
- 1988 - Nettowāku Kyōto (magazine) in publication.
- 1994 - Kyoto UNESCO World Heritage Site established.
- 1995 - Kyoto Concert Hall opens.
- 1996 - Yorikane Masumoto elected mayor.
- 1997
  - Kyōto Station rebuilt.
  - City hosts signing of the Kyoto Protocol.
- 2000
  - Kyoto Art Center opens.
  - Population: 1,467,705.

== 21st century ==
- 2001 - Movix Kyoto (cinema) opens.
- 2008 - February 17: 2008 Kyoto mayoral election held; Daisaku Kadokawa wins.
- 2011 - Population: 1,473,746.
- 2012 - February 5: 2012 Kyoto mayoral election held.
- 2019 – July 18: An arson fire burned down the original Kyoto Animation studio. 36 employees were killed.

== See also ==
- Kyoto history
- List of mayors of Kyoto
- List of Buddhist temples in Kyoto
- List of Shinto shrines in Kyoto

== Bibliography ==
Published in the 17th-19th centuries

- Kyo-habutae [Kyoto Brocade] (in Japanese). 1685. (guidebook)
- Kaibara Ekiken (1706–1718). Keijo shoran [Excellent Views of Kyoto] (in Japanese). Kyoto: Ryugiken.
- Hiroshige, Kyoto meisho no uchi [Famous Places of Kyoto] (in Japanese) c. 1835
- M. Ichihara (1895), Official guide-book to Kyoto and the allied prefectures, Nara: Meishinsha, OCLC 2600346

Published in the 20th century

- Kyoto City Council (1903). Kyōto, Japan. K. Azumae.
- H. Hotta (1903). "City of Kyoto". Up-to-date guide for the land of the rising sun. Kobe: Z.P. Maruya & Co.
- Basil Hall Chamberlain; W.B. Mason (1907), "Kyōto", Handbook for Travellers in Japan (8th ed.), London: J. Murray, OCLC 1329108
- "Kioto" . Encyclopædia Britannica. Vol. 15 (11th ed.). 1910. p. 825.
- T. Philip Terry (1914), "Kyoto and its Environs", Terry's Japanese Empire, Boston: Houghton Mifflin, LCCN 14005129
- Robert P. Porter (1915), "The Larger Cities: Kyoto", Japan, the new world-power (2nd ed.), London: Milford
- Richard Ponsonby-Fane. (1956). Kyoto: The Old Capital of Japan, 794-1869. Kyoto: The Ponsonby Memorial Society.
- Schellinger and Salkin, ed. (1996). "Kyoto". International Dictionary of Historic Places: Asia and Oceania. UK: Routledge. p. 515+. ISBN 9781884964046.
- Mary Elizabeth Berry (1997). "Transitions in Kyoto's Government, 1467-1568". The Culture of Civil War in Kyoto. University of California Press. ISBN 978-0-520-91903-7.
- Mason Florence (1998), Kyoto, Lonely Planet, OL 8314749M
- Ian Martin Röpke (1999). Historical Dictionary of Osaka and Kyoto. Historical Dictionaries of Cities of the World. Maryland, US: Scarecrow Press. ISBN 978-0-8108-3622-8.

Published in the 21st century

- Suzanne Marie Gay (2001). The Moneylenders of Late Medieval Kyoto. University of Hawaii Press. ISBN 978-0-8248-2461-7.
- Nicolas Fiévé and Paul Waley [in French], ed. (2003). Japanese Capitals in Historical Perspective: Place, Power and Memory in Kyoto, Edo and Tokyo. RoutledgeCurzon. ISBN 978-0-7007-1409-4.
- Diane Durston (2005). "History". Old Kyoto: A Guide to Traditional Shops, Restaurants, and Inns. Kodansha International. ISBN 978-4-7700-2994-2.
- John Dougill (2006). "City of Unification". Kyoto: A Cultural History. Cityscapes. Oxford University Press. p. 109+. ISBN 978-0-19-976046-6.
- Matthew P. McKelway (2006). Capitalscapes: Folding Screens And Political Imagination in Late Medieval Kyoto. University of Hawaii Press. ISBN 978-0-8248-2900-1.
- Christoph Brumann (2012). "Re-uniting a divided city: High-rises, conflict, and urban space in central Kyoto". In Christoph Brumann and Evelyn Schulz (ed.). Urban Spaces in Japan: Cultural and Social Perspectives. Japanese Studies Series. Routledge. ISBN 978-1-136-31883-2.
- Christoph Brumann (2012). Tradition, Democracy and the Townscape of Kyoto: Claiming a Right to the Past. Routledge. ISBN 978-0-415-69070-6.
