= Kyoto-Varanasi Partner City Agreement =

Shortly after arriving in Kyoto, Japan, for a 5-day bilateral meeting with Prime Minister of Japan Shinzo Abe, Prime Minister of India Narendra Modi and Prime Minister Abe announced the Kyoto-Varanasi Partner City Agreement. The text of the agreement was signed in the presence of the leaders of both nations by Mayor of Kyoto Daisaku Kadokawa and Ambassador of India to Japan Smt. Deepa Gopalan Wadhwa.

On 3 December 2014, the Press Information Bureau (PIB) of the Government of India's Ministry of Urban Development announced the formation of an 11-member steering committee to facilitate, in line with Prime Minister Modi's directives, the modernization of water management, sewage management, waste management and urban transportation, "drawing upon Japanese expertise and technologies." The committee will also promote the "application of Japanese practices, techniques and management for conservation of rich heritage of Varanasi" and foster "exchanges between Kyoto University and Banaras Hindu University, as well as religious organisations."
