= 2024 Kyoto mayoral election =

- 4 February 2024
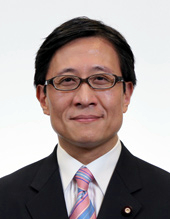

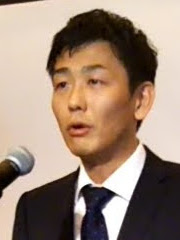
		JCP
Candidate	Koji Matsui	Kazuhito Fukuyama
Party	Independent	Independent
Popular vote	177,454	161,203
Percentage	37.92%	34.44%
Supported by	LDP, CDP, Komeito, DPP	JCP
		IND
Candidate	Shōei Murayama	Shinji Ninoyu
Party	Independent	Independent
Popular vote	72,613	54,430
Percentage	15.52%	11.63%
- Results by Ward; Matsui: 30-40% 40-50% Fukuyama: 30-40%
Mayor before election
Daisaku Kadokawa
Independent
Elected mayor
Koji Matsui
Independent

The 2024 Kyoto mayoral election was held on 4 February 2024. Incumbent mayor Daisaku Kadokawa did not run for a fifth term. Former Deputy Chief Cabinet Secretary Koji Matsui won by a slim margin of 3.48% against challengers Kazuhito Fukuyama, Shōei Murayama, and Shinji Ninoyu, two of which had run in the previous 2020 election.

== Overview ==
Daisaku Kadokawa opted against running for a fifth term. This was the first time since the 2008 election that no incumbent had run for another term. Koji Matsui, who had previously served as Deputy Chief Cabinet Secretary in the Hatoyama Cabinet from 2009 to 2010, was supported by a coalition of governmental and non-governmental political groups, including the LDP, CDP, Komeito, and the DPP. Kazuhito Fukuyama, who had run for mayor in 2020 with the JCPs backing, received support from the party again. Also running was former 2020 and 2008 candidate Shōei Murayama, Independent and former Kyoto Prefectural Assembly member Shinji Ninoyu, and Heian Conservative Party candidate Yu Kouke.

== Campaigning ==
Campaigning centered around the overtourism of Kyoto and the financial crisis the city was facing. Matsui campaigned utilizing solutions to the tourism issue, including introducing a new two-tiered transportation system for tourists and non-tourists. He also advertised via using his advancements as Deputy Chief Cabinet Secretary. The LDP was heavily disengaged from his campaign, and he primarily utilized CDP opposition leaders, including Kenta Izumi, who served as a personal friend of Matsui. Fukuyama utilized the LDP endorsement of Matsui to attack him by highlighting the slush fund scandal the party had been facing, and also advertising the construction of a new social welfare system and attempting to deal with both the budget crisis and overtourism as well.

== Candidates ==
In order of notification of candidacy:

Candidate	Age	Party	Title
Kazuhito Fukuyama	62	Independent (Backed by JCP)	Lawyer; Former candidate for Mayor
Shōei Murayama	45	Independent	Former Kyoto City Councilor; Kyoto Party Policy Advisor
Shinji Ninoyu	44	Independent	Former Kyoto Prefectural Assembly Member
Koji Matsui	63	Independent (Backed by LDP, CDP, Komeito, DPP)	Former Deputy Chief Cabinet Secretary; Former Member of the House of Councillors
Yu Kouke	35	Heian Conservative Party	Businessman

== Results ==
Candidate	Party	Votes	%	+/–
Koji Matsui	Independent, LDP, CDP, Komeito, DPP	177,454	37.92	N/A
Kazuhito Fukuyama	Independent, JCP	161,203	34.44	–0.16
Shōei Murayama	Independent	72,613	15.52	–4.79
Shinji Ninoyu	Independent	54,430	11.63	N/A
Yu Kouke	Heian Conservative	2,316	0.49	N/A
Total		468,016	100.00	–
Valid votes		468,016	98.64	
Invalid/blank votes		6,455	1.36	
Total votes		474,471	100.00	
Registered voters/turnout		1,138,567	41.67	+0.96
Source: Kyoto City Council, NHK

Votes by Ward
Ward	Koji Matsui		Kazuhito Fukuyama		Shōei Murayama		Shinji Ninoyu		Yu Kouke	
Ward	Votes	%	Votes	%	Votes	%	Votes	%	Votes	%
Total	177,454	37.92%	161,203	34.44%	72,613	15.52%	54,430	11.63%	2,316	0.49%
Kita	14,648	36.14%	15,184	37.46%	6,188	15.27%	4,355	10.75%	155	0.38%
Kamigyō	10,333	36.16%	10,558	36.95%	4,405	15.42%	3,160	11.06%	116	0.41%
Sakyō	18,733	31.70%	23,153	39.18%	12,661	21.43%	4,291	7.26%	253	0.43%
Nakagyō	15,315	38.55%	13,174	33.16%	6,333	15.94%	4,692	11.81%	211	0.53%
Higashiyama	4,331	37.61%	3,971	34.48%	1,926	16.72%	1,216	10.56%	72	0.63%
Yamashina	16,921	42.26%	12,974	32.40%	5,832	14.56%	4,109	10.26%	206	0.51%
Shimogyō	10,058	38.28%	8,527	32.45%	4,468	17.01%	3,099	11.79%	122	0.46%
Minami	11,686	40.99%	9,310	32.66%	4,172	14.63%	3,145	11.03%	195	0.68%
Ukyō	23,101	34.44%	21,804	32.50%	9,551	14.24%	12,358	18.42%	271	0.40%
Nishikyō	19,036	39.44%	15,766	32.67%	7,375	15.28%	5,840	12.10%	246	0.51%
Fushimi	33,292	42.46%	26,782	34.16%	9,702	12.37%	8,165	10.41%	469	0.60%
