= Koji Matsui (politician) =

Japanese politician

Kōji Matsui
- 松井 孝治
- Official portrait, 2025

27th Mayor of Kyoto
- Incumbent
- Assumed office 25 February 2024
- Preceded by: Daisaku Kadokawa

Deputy Chief Cabinet Secretary (Political affairs, House of Councillors)
- In office 16 September 2009 – 8 June 2010
- Prime Minister: Yukio Hatoyama
- Preceded by: Katsuhito Asano
- Succeeded by: Tetsuro Fukuyama

Member of the House of Councillors
- In office 29 July 2001 – 28 July 2013
- Preceded by: Teiko Sasano
- Succeeded by: Akiko Kurabayashi
- Constituency: Kyoto at-large

Personal details
- Born: 24 April 1960 (age 66) Nakagyō, Kyoto, Japan
- Party: Independent
- Other political affiliations: Democratic (2001–2013)
- Education: University of Tokyo; Northwestern University
- Website: https://matsuikoji.kyoto/

Kōji Matsui (松井 孝治, Matsui Kōji; born 24 April 1960) is a Japanese politician who was elected Mayor of Kyoto in 2024. Matsui was a member of the House of Councillors from Kyoto at-large district between 2001 and 2013, as a member of the Democratic Party of Japan. He served as Deputy Chief Cabinet Secretary in the Yukio Hatoyama Cabinet.

Before entering politics Matsui was a bureaucrat in the Ministry of International Trade and Industry.

== Early life and education ==
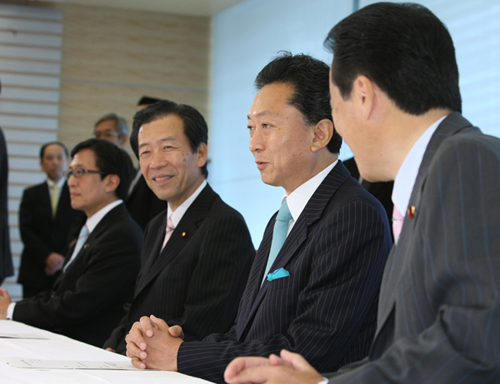
Matsui with Hirofumi Hirano, Yukio Hatoyama and Naoto Kan in September 2009

Koji Matsui was born in Kyoto on 25 April 1960. His family owned an inn in central Kyoto where they also lived. Matsui enrolled at the University of Tokyo, where he majored in international relations. While being a student he read the novel The Summer of Bureaucrats (官僚たちの夏) by Saburo Shiroyama, which inspired him to join the Ministry of International Trade and Industry when he graduated in 1983.

While in the ministry Matsui was sent to the Kellogg School of Management at Northwestern University in the United States for further education and earned an MBA in 1990. From 1994 to 1996 he was seconded to the Cabinet Secretariat. In 2000, he retired from the Ministry to enter politics.

== Political career ==
Matsui was elected from Kyoto at-large district as a member of the Democratic Party of Japan in the 2001 House of Councillors election. He was reelected in 2007.

When the DPJ took power in the 2009 House of Representatives election, Matsui was appointed Deputy Chief Cabinet Secretary under Prime Minister Yukio Hatoyama. He left when Hatoyama was replaced by Naoto Kan in June 2010. Matsui declined to run for reelection in the 2013 House of Councillors election. He afterwards worked as a professor at Keio University.

In November 2023 Matsui announced he would run in the 2024 Kyoto mayoral election. He subsequently received the endorsements of the Liberal Democratic Party, the Constitutional Democratic Party of Japan, the Komeito and the Democratic Party for the People. He was also endorsed by outgoing Mayor Daisaku Kadokawa and the Governor of Kyoto Prefecture Takatoshi Nishiwaki. Matsui won the election when it was held in February 2024, beginning his term on February 25.
