= 2016 Kyoto mayoral election =

- 7 February 2016
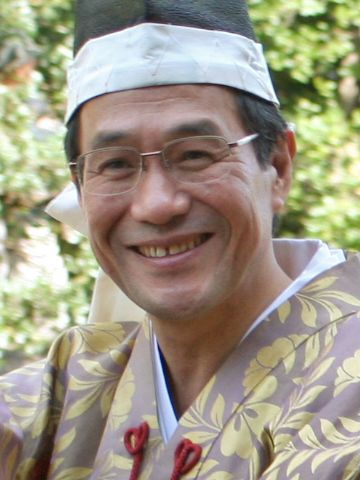
		JCP
Candidate	Daisaku Kadokawa	Kumiko Honda
Party	Independent	Independent
Popular vote	254,545	129,119
Percentage	63.8%	32.36%
Supported by	LDP, DPJ, Komeito, SDP	JCP
- Results by Ward; Kadokawa: 50-60% 60-70%
Mayor before election
Daisaku Kadokawa
Independent
Elected mayor
Daisaku Kadokawa
Independent

The 2016 Kyoto mayoral election was held on February 7, 2016. Incumbent mayor Daisaku Kadokawa ran for a third term, opposed by Independent and JCP politician Kumiko Honda and Independent Takashi Mikami. The total votes in the election were 398,988, a slight decrease in turnout compared to 2012. Kadokawa won by a wide margin compared to his 2012 election.

== Overview ==
The election was held upon the expiration of the term of incumbent Daisaku Kadokawa. Kadokawa ran for another term, and was backed by the LDP, DPJ, Komeito, and SDP. The Japanese Communist Party supported Kumiko Honda. There was thought briefly that Nippon Ishin no Kai and the Kyoto Party, a smaller regional conservative group, would run Kyoto City Councilor Yoshie Murayama on a joint-ticket, but the two parties split and the candidacy was aborted. Both parties chose to support neither candidate afterwards. Takashi Mikami also ran as an independent.

== Candidates ==
Three candidates ran, two of which were backed by national parties.

Name	Age	Party	Title
Daisaku Kadokawa	65	Independent	Incumbent Mayor of Kyoto; Former Superintendent of Education in Kyoto
Takashi Mikami	85	Independent	Former Kyoto Prefectural Assembly Member
Kumiko Honda	66	Independent	Kyoto Education Center Executive Director; Former City Teachers Union Executive Committee Chairman

== Results ==
Candidate	Party	Votes	%	+/–
Daisaku Kadokawa	Independent, LDP, DPJ, Komeito, SDP	254,545	63.80	+9.94
Kumiko Honda	Independent, JCP	129,119	32.36	N/A
Takashi Mikami	Independent	15,334	3.84	N/A
Total		398,998	100.00	–
Valid votes		398,998	98.00	
Invalid/blank votes		8,123	2.00	
Total votes		407,121	100.00	
Registered voters/turnout		1,141,060	35.68	–1.09
Source: Kyoto City Council, Eonet

=== By ward ===
Ward Counting Results
Ward	Daisaku Kadokawa		Kumiko Honda		Takashi Mikami	
Ward	Votes	%	Votes	%	Votes	%
Total	254,545	63.80%	129,119	32.36%	15,334	3.84%
Kita	20,453	60.06%	12,276	36.05%	1,328	3.90%
Kamigyō	15,263	62.49%	8,190	33.53%	972	3.98%
Sakyō	26,715	55.65%	19,167	39.92%	2,126	4.43%
Nakagyō	20,009	63.66%	10,016	31.87%	1,406	4.47%
Higashiyama	6,558	61.19%	3,621	33.79%	538	5.02%
Yamashina	24,370	67.16%	10,625	29.28%	1,289	3.55%
Shimogyō	13,454	64.42%	6,429	30.78%	1,001	4.79%
Minami	16,007	64.53%	7,859	31.68%	941	3.79%
Ukyō	35,530	63.58%	18,373	32.88%	1,979	3.54%
Nishikyō	27,571	66.92%	12,153	29.50%	1,475	3.58%
Fushimi	48,615	68.18%	20,410	28.62%	2,279	3.20%
