= Kyoto Hemp Forum =

Hemp industry event held in Kyoto

Kyoto Hemp Forum (also called 世界麻環境フォーラム京都, International Hemp Environmental Forum Kyoto) is a hemp industry event held in Kyoto. The first event was held in July 2016. Featured speakers included Japanese politicians first lady Akie Abe and the Mayor of Kyoto, Daisaku Kadokawa, as well as U.S. activist Chris Conrad and Dutch seed entrepreneur Ben Dronkers. The title of Conrad's book Hemp: Lifeline to the Future was also the official theme of the event. Exhibitors at the forum include an Australian hemp seed company whose biggest market is Japan.
