= 2012 Kyoto mayoral election =

← 2008	5 February 2012	2016 →
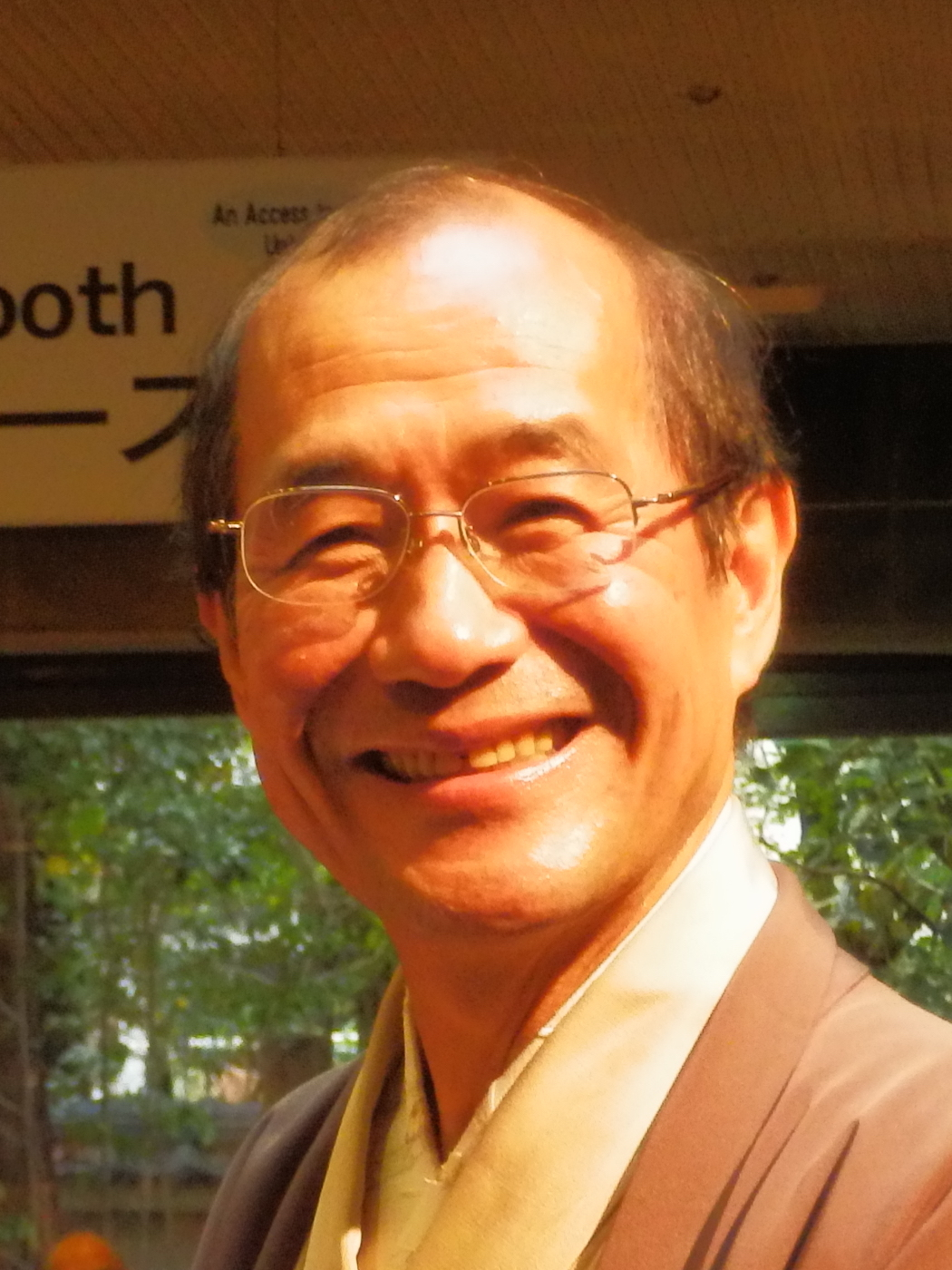

Candidate	Daisaku Kadokawa	Kazuo Nakamura
Party	Independent	Independent
Popular vote	221,765	189,971
Percentage	53.86%	46.14%
Supported by	DPJ, LDP, Komeito, Your Party, SDPJ	JCP
- Majority vote per ward.
Mayor before election
Daisaku Kadokawa
Independent
Elected mayor
Daisaku Kadokawa
Independent

The 2012 Kyoto mayoral election was held on February 5, 2012. The incumbent mayor Daisaku Kadokawa won over a candidate backed by the JCP with a margin of 31,794 votes. It was considered that his first term was generally appreciated by the voters.

== Results ==
Mayoral election 2012: Kyoto
Party	Candidate	Votes	%	±%
Independent, DPJ, LDP, Komeito, Your Party, SDP	Daisaku Kadokawa	221,765	53.86 %	
Independent, JCP	Kazuo Nakamura	189,971	46.14 %	
Turnout		419,217	36.77 %	

=== Results per ward ===
==== Kita-ku ====
Mayoral election 2012: Kyoto
Party	Candidate	Votes	%	±%
Independent, DPJ, LDP, Komeito, Your Party, SDP	Daisaku Kadokawa	18,314	51.21 %	
Independent, JCP	Kazuo Nakamura	17,451	48.79 %	
Turnout		35,765		

==== Kamigyō-ku ====
Mayoral election 2012: Kyoto
Party	Candidate	Votes	%	±%
Independent, DPJ, LDP, Komeito, Your Party, SDP	Daisaku Kadokawa	14,081	53.94 %	
Independent, JCP	Kazuo Nakamura	12,023	46.06 %	
Turnout		26,104		

==== Sakyō-ku ====
Mayoral election 2012: Kyoto
Party	Candidate	Votes	%	±%
Independent, DPJ, LDP, Komeito, Your Party, SDP	Daisaku Kadokawa	24545	48.26 %	
Independent, JCP	Kazuo Nakamura	26311	51.74 %	
Turnout		50,856		

==== Nakagyō-ku ====
Mayoral election 2012: Kyoto
Party	Candidate	Votes	%	±%
Independent, DPJ, LDP, Komeito, Your Party, SDP	Daisaku Kadokawa	17,365	54.24 %	
Independent, JCP	Kazuo Nakamura	14,648	45.76 %	
Turnout		32,013		

==== Higashiyama-ku ====
Mayoral election 2012: Kyoto
Party	Candidate	Votes	%	±%
Independent, DPJ, LDP, Komeito, Your Party, SDP	Daisaku Kadokawa	6,877	56.09 %	
Independent, JCP	Kazuo Nakamura	5,384	43.91 %	
Turnout		12,261		

==== Yamashina-ku ====
Mayoral election 2012: Kyoto
Party	Candidate	Votes	%	±%
Independent, DPJ, LDP, Komeito, Your Party, SDP	Daisaku Kadokawa	20,723	56.17 %	
Independent, JCP	Kazuo Nakamura	16,168	43.83 %	
Turnout		36,891		

==== Shimogyō-ku ====
Mayoral election 2012: Kyoto
Party	Candidate	Votes	%	±%
Independent, DPJ, LDP, Komeito, Your Party, SDP	Daisaku Kadokawa	12,253	55.74 %	
Independent, JCP	Kazuo Nakamura	9,731	44.26 %	
Turnout		21,984		

==== Minami-ku ====
Mayoral election 2012: Kyoto
Party	Candidate	Votes	%	±%
Independent, DPJ, LDP, Komeito, Your Party, SDP	Daisaku Kadokawa	13,200	52.02 %	
Independent, JCP	Kazuo Nakamura	12,177	47.98 %	
Turnout		25377		

==== Ukyō-ku ====
Mayoral election 2012: Kyoto
Party	Candidate	Votes	%	±%
Independent, DPJ, LDP, Komeito, Your Party, SDP	Daisaku Kadokawa	30,832	53.79 %	
Independent, JCP	Kazuo Nakamura	26,484	46.21 %	
Turnout		57,316		

==== Nishikyō-ku ====
Mayoral election 2012: Kyoto
Party	Candidate	Votes	%	±%
Independent, DPJ, LDP, Komeito, Your Party, SDP	Daisaku Kadokawa	23,688	56.87 %	
Independent, JCP	Kazuo Nakamura	17,963	43.13 %	
Turnout		41,651		

==== Fushimi-ku ====
Mayoral election 2012: Kyoto
Party	Candidate	Votes	%	±%
Independent, DPJ, LDP, Komeito, Your Party, SDP	Daisaku Kadokawa	39,887	55.77 %	
Independent, JCP	Kazuo Nakamura	31,631	44.23 %	
Turnout		71,518		
