= Yorikane Masumoto =

Japanese politician

- 桝本 頼兼

25th Mayor of Kyoto
- In office 25 February 1996 – 24 February 2008
- Preceded by: Tomoyuki Tanabe
- Succeeded by: Daisaku Kadokawa

Personal details
- Born: January 29, 1941 (age 85) Dalian, China
- Party: Independent
- Education: Chuo University

Yorikane Masumoto (桝本 頼兼, Masumoto Yorikane; born January 29, 1941) is a Japanese politician who was mayor of Kyoto from 1996 to 2008. A graduate of Chuo University, he was first elected in February 1996. After three full terms in office he did not run again in the 2008 mayoral election.
