= Maruyama Park (Kyoto) =

Park in Kyoto, Japan

Maruyama Park (円山公園, Maruyama kōen)
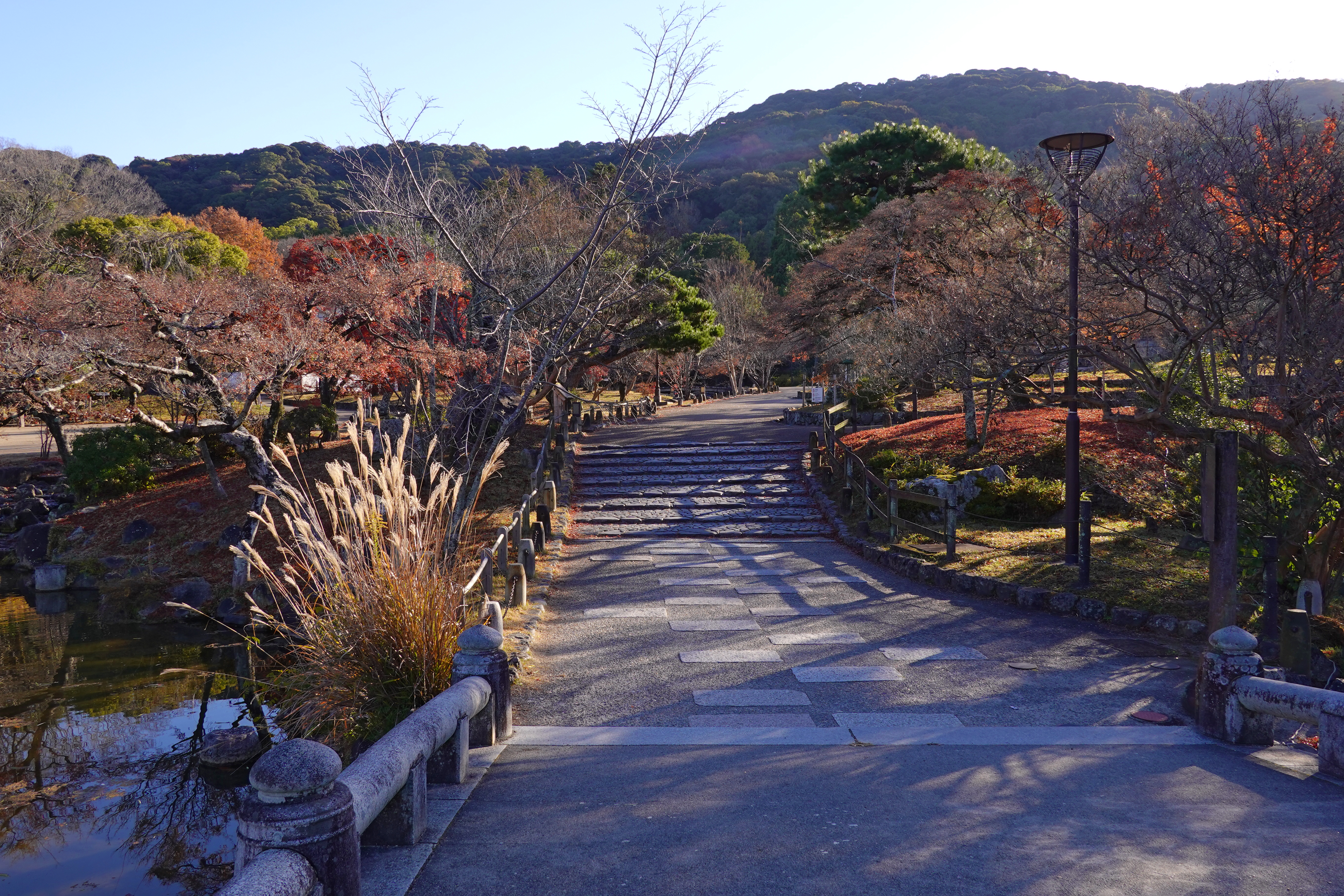
- Interactive map of Maruyama Park (円山公園, Maruyama kōen)
- Type: Urban park
- Location: Kyoto, Japan
- Coordinates: 35°00′12″N 135°46′53″E

Maruyama Park (円山公園, Maruyama kōen) is a park in Kyoto, Japan. It is noted as the main center for cherry blossom viewing in Kyoto, and can get extremely crowded at that time of year (April). The park's star attraction is a weeping cherry tree (shidarezakura) which becomes lit up at night. It also becomes busy in the New Year's Eve Festivals.

The main entrance to the park is through Yasaka Shrine, which sits at the eastern end of Shijō Street in the Gion District. Directly to the north (and abutting the park) is the vast temple of Chion-in, followed by the smaller temple of Shōren-in. The park is a nationally designated Place of Scenic Beauty.
