= Wards of Kyoto =

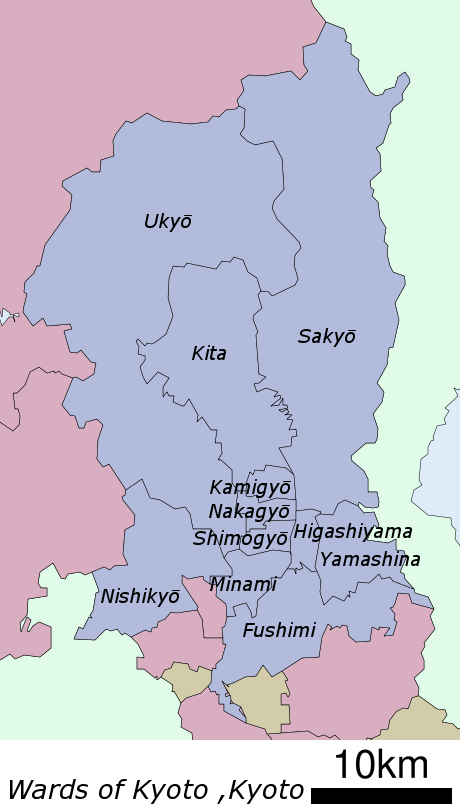
Wards of Kyoto

The city of Kyoto in Kyoto Prefecture, Japan has eleven wards.

Wards of Kyoto
Name	Japanese	Established	Code
Fushimi-ku	伏見区	1931 (by merger of surrounding municipalities)	261092
Higashiyama-ku	東山区	1921 (divided from Kamigyō)	261050
Kamigyō-ku	上京区	1879 (one of original two wards)	261025
Kita-ku	北区	1955 (divided from Kamigyō)	261017
Minami-ku	南区	1955 (divided from Shimogyō)	261076
Nakagyō-ku	中京区	1929 (divided from Kamigyō and Shimogyō)	261041
Nishikyō-ku	西京区	1976 (divided from Ukyō)	261114
Sakyō-ku	左京区	1929 (divided from Kamigyō)	261033
Shimogyō-ku	下京区	1879 (one of original two wards)	261068
Ukyō-ku	右京区	1931 (by merger of surrounding municipalities)	261084
Yamashina-ku	山科区	1976 (divided from Higashiyama)	261106

Unlike the 23 special wards of Tokyo, the wards of Kyoto are not separate municipalities, they are divisions just for municipal administration. Together, they comprise the city of Kyoto, under a single mayor and city council.

Area, Population and Density (2015)
Name	Population	Density (/km^{2})	Area (km^{2})	% of total	Forest Area (km^{2})	Forest Cover	Inhabitable Area	
Name	Population	Density (/km^{2})	Area (km^{2})	% of total	Forest Area (km^{2})	Forest Cover	(km^{2})	Density (/km^{2})
Fushimi-ku	280,655	4,552	61.66	7.4%	14.58	23.6%	47.12	5,956
Higashiyama-ku	39,044	5,220	7.48	0.9%	1.58	21.1%	5.90	6,618
Kamigyō-ku	85,113	12,107	7.03	0.8%	0.00	0.0%	7.03	12,107
Kita-ku	119,474	1,259	94.88	11.5%	78.85	83.1%	16.02	7,458
Minami-ku	99,927	6,320	15.81	1.9%	0.00	0.0%	15.81	6,320
Nakagyō-ku	109,341	14,756	7.41	0.9%	0.00	0.0%	7.41	14,756
Nishikyō-ku	150,962	2,548	59.24	7.2%	32.53	54.9%	26.82	5,629
Sakyō-ku	168,266	682	246.77	29.8%	215.26	87.2%	31.55	5,333
Shimogyō-ku	82,668	12,193	6.78	0.8%	0.00	0.0%	6.78	12,193
Ukyō-ku	204,262	699	292.07	35.3%	253.77	86.9%	38.29	5,335
Yamashina-ku	135,471	4,720	28.70	3.5%	13.64	47.5%	15.40	8,797
Total	1,475,183	1,782	827.83	100.0%	610.21	73.7%	218.13	6,763
