= Kyoto Art Center =

Art center

Coordinates: 35°00′19.5″N 135°45′30″E

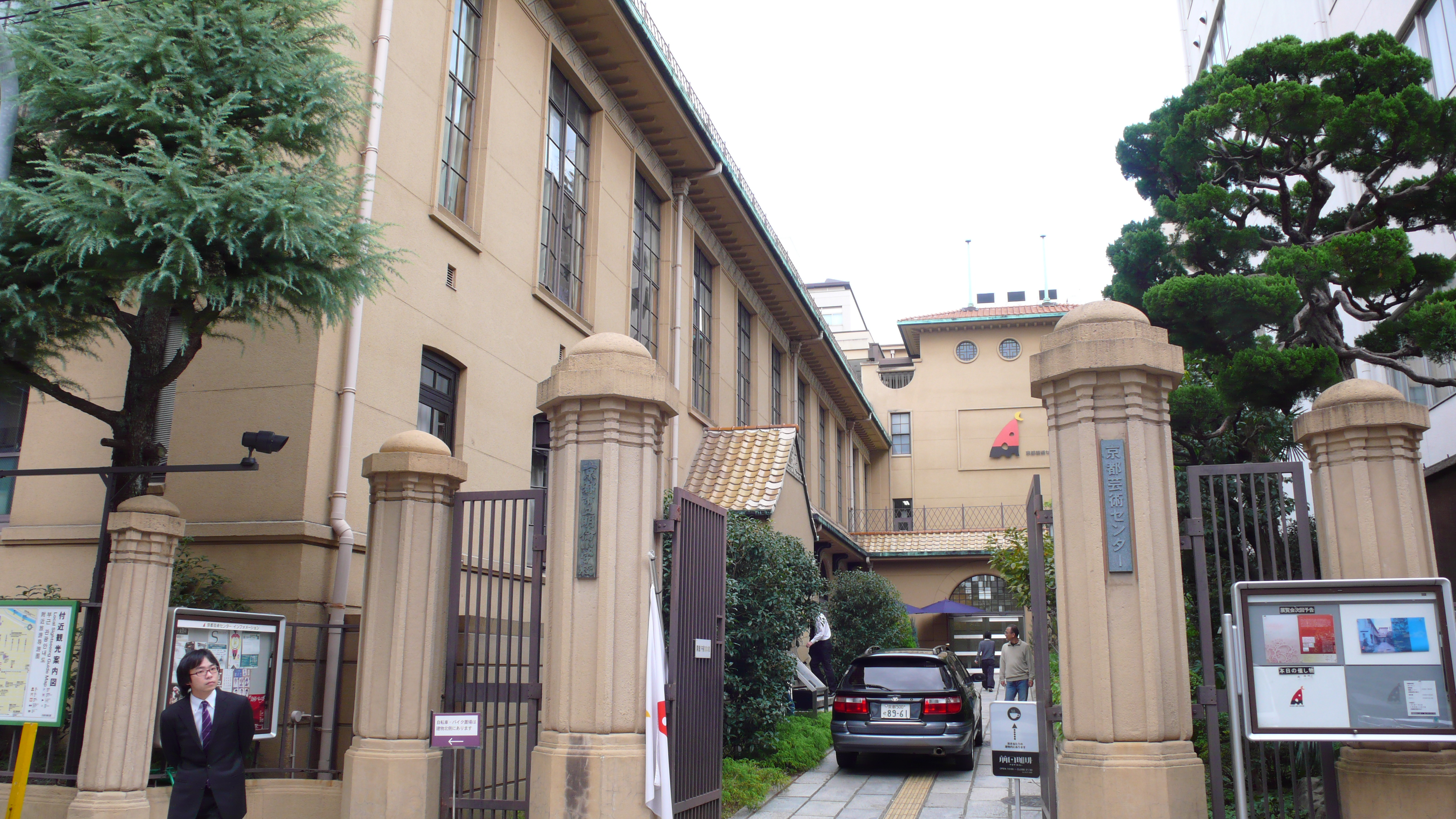
View of front gate

The Kyoto Art Center (京都芸術センター, Kyōto Geijutsu Sentā) is a venue for promoting the arts which is located in the heart of Kyoto, Japan. The center, a three-story reinforced-concrete building, occupies the site of the former Meirin Elementary School (founded by the people of Kyoto during the Meiji era). It has a studio, gallery, auditorium, Japanese-style hall, free space, library, an information corner, Japanese-style tea room, the Maeda Coffee Meirin coffee shop, a common room and shops. Kyoto Arts and Culture Foundation manages the center, which aims to support artistic activities, act as a clearinghouse for arts information, plan artist in residence programs and promote artists to the public. In 2008 the north, south and west wings, the gate and wall of the center were registered as one of the Tangible Cultural Properties of Japan.

== History ==
- 1869: Opening of the Sanbangumi elementary school on the site of Meirinsya, changing its name to Meirin Elementary School
- 1931: Renovating the building in reinforced concrete
- 1993: Closing of Meirin Elementary School
- 1996: Construction of ”art and culture center” building on the site of the Meirin Elementary School under collaborative projects for re-use of sites and promoting the arts in Kyoto
- 2000 (April): Renovating the former Meirin Elementary School building and opening of Kyoto Art Center
- 2008 (July 23): Registered as one of the Tangible Cultural Properties of Japan

== Activities ==
In addition to Japanese contemporary arts programs, a number of international events occur at the center. Since 2010, an international theater festival, the Kyoto Experiment has been held in late September and October. A long-running program, the Traditional Theater Training program (T.T.T.), originally started in 1985 by scholar of Japanese theater Jonah Salz, and now under the aegis of the Kyoto Art Center, gives an intensive course in a traditional Japanese theatrical form – originally kyōgen, now also Noh and nihonbuyō, and a separate course in kotsuzumi (drumming) – for beginners (originally 6 weeks, now 3 weeks). Approximately half the participants are foreign and half are Japanese; since 2011 the weekend workshop at the start of the program, which gives a taste of various aspects of Japanese theater, has been available separately (lectures are in Japanese with English interpretation).
