= 2008 Kyoto mayoral election =

← 2004	17 February 2008	2012 →
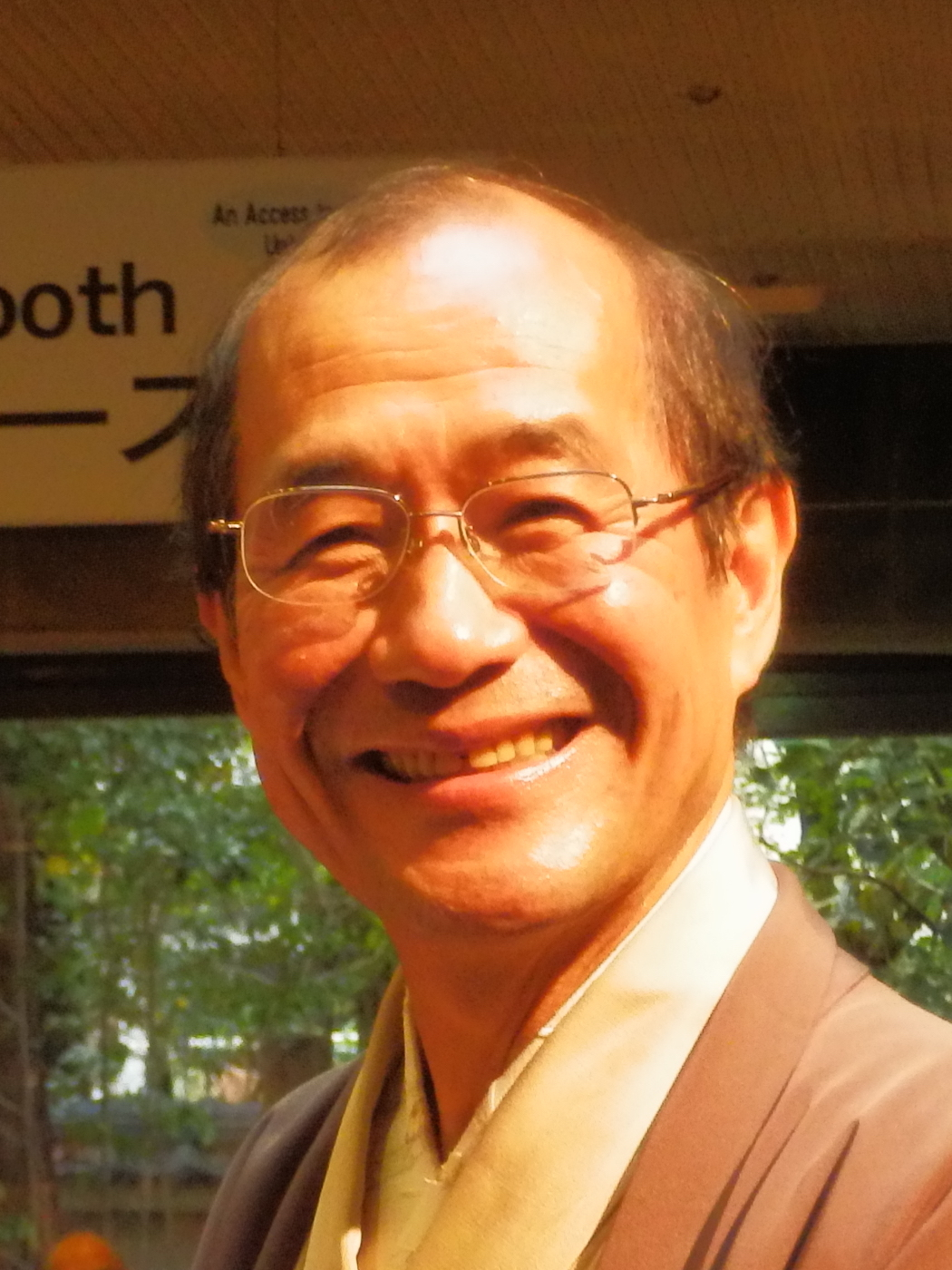

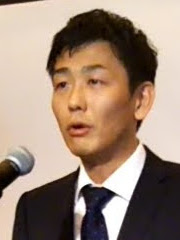

Candidate	Daisaku Kadokawa	Kazuo Nakamura
Party	Independent	Independent
Popular vote	158,472	157,521
Percentage	37.25%	37.02%
Supported by	LDP, Komeito, DPJ, SDPJ	JCP
Candidate	Shōei Murayama	Toshihiko Okada
Party	Independent	Independent
Popular vote	84,750	24,702
Percentage	19.92%	5.81%
Mayor before election
Yorikane Masumoto
Independent
Elected mayor
Daisaku Kadokawa
Independent

Kyoto held a mayoral election on February 17, 2008. Daisaku Kadokawa narrowly won over a candidate backed by the JCP with a margin of 951 votes. The poll was to choose a successor to Yorikane Masumoto, who announced his resignation after serving three terms for a total 12 years in office

== Candidates ==
- Daisaku Kadokawa, 57, former head of Kyoto Municipal Board of Education and supported by all major parties except the JCP.
- Kazuo Nakamura, 53, working as a lawyer and supported by the Japanese Communist Party
- Shoei Murayama, 29, independent former member of the Kyoto municipal assembly
- Toshihiko Okada, 61, independent

== Results ==
Mayoral election 2008: Kyoto
Party	Candidate	Votes	%	±%
Independent, LDP, DPJ, Komeito,SDP	Daisaku Kadokawa	158,472	37,25 %	
Independent, JCP	Kazuo Nakamura	157,521	37,02 %	
Independent	Shoei Murayama	84,750	19,92 %	
Independent	Toshihiko Okada	24,702	5,81 %	
Turnout		425,445	37.82 %	
