= Daisaku Kadokawa =

Japanese politician

- 門川 大作
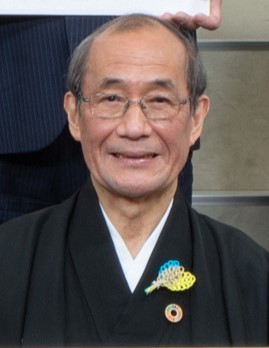

26th Mayor of Kyoto
- In office 26 February 2008 – 24 February 2024
- Preceded by: Yorikane Masumoto
- Succeeded by: Koji Matsui

Personal details
- Born: November 23, 1950 (age 75) Kyoto, Japan
- Party: Independent
- Children: 4
- Education: Ritsumeikan University

Daisaku Kadokawa (門川 大作, Kadokawa Daisaku) is a Japanese politician and former mayor of Kyoto City, the capital city of Kyoto Prefecture.

== Overview ==
Kadokawa was born in Nakagyo Ward, Kyoto City, Kyoto Prefecture. In 1969, he graduated from Kyoto Municipal Horikawa High School. Shortly afterwards, he started working for the Kyoto City Board of Education, while at the same time attending Ritsumeikan University Faculty of Law No. 2 to obtain a degree. He was the Kyoto City Superintendent of Education between 2001 and 2007. He was elected in the 2008 Kyoto mayoral election, receiving endorsements from the Liberal Democratic Party, the Komeito Party, and the Kyoto prefectural chapters of the Democratic Party and the Social Democratic Party. After four full terms in office he did not run again in the 2024 mayoral election.

== Person ==
- Kadokawa likes the kimono and always attended city council meetings and other events wearing one. It is customary for the mayor of Kyoto to wear traditional Japanese clothes.
- In June 2019, he sent a letter of protest to Kim Kardashian because of her attempt to trademark the name "KIMONO" for her new underwear line. In the letter he said "It is a common asset of all people who love the culture of the Japanese and the Japanese and the world," and I believe that it should not be monopolized privately."

== Controversy ==
On the evening of July 18, 2019, when Kadokawa attended a party for the 25th House of Councillors who usually elect a candidate for the Kyoto Prefecture constituency, he mentioned the Kyoto Animation arson case, saying that "3 minutes and 10 minutes are important when fighting fires, and the election can be reversed in the last two days", which was criticized as inappropriate remarks Kadokawa himself apologized for speaking on the 19th.
