= 8300 series =

8300 series may refer to:

- Hankyu 8300 series
- Nankai 8300 series
