= Kami-Katsura Station =

Railway station in Kyoto, Japan

Kami-Katsura Station 上桂駅
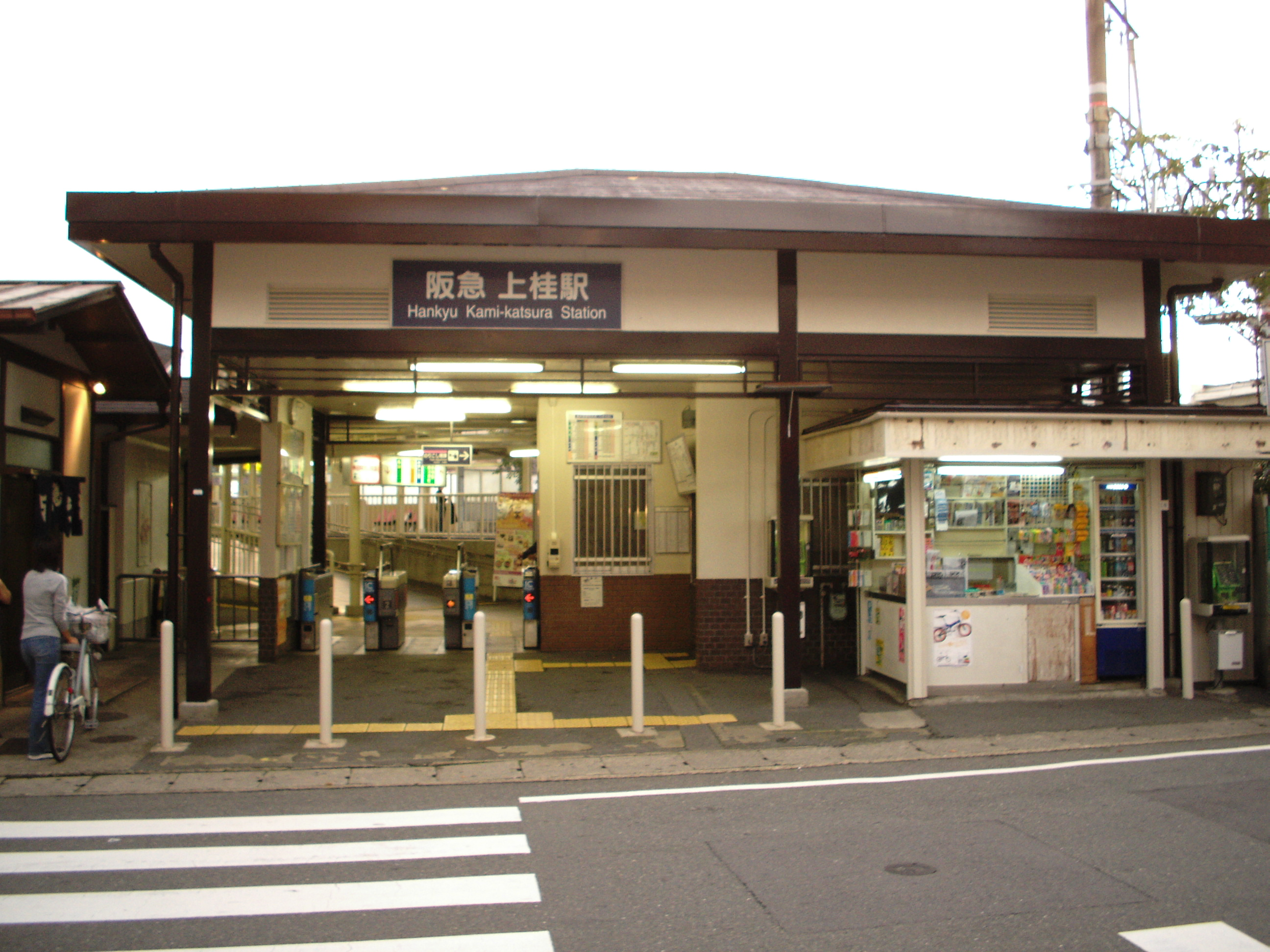
- Kami-Katsura Station in 2006

General information
- Location: Nishikyō-ku, Kyoto, Kyoto; Japan
- Coordinates: 34°59′25″N 135°41′45″E
- Operator: Hankyu
- Line: Hankyu Arashiyama Line
- Platforms: 2
- Tracks: 2

Construction
- Structure type: At-grade

Other information
- Station code: HK-96
- Website: Official (in Japanese)

Passengers
- FY2015: 3.3 million
Location

Kami-Katsura Station (上桂駅, Kami-Katsura-eki) is a train station in Nishikyō-ku, Kyoto, Kyoto Prefecture, Japan.

== Lines ==
- Hankyu Railway
  - Arashiyama Line

== Layout ==
The station has two platforms serving two tracks.

== Usage ==
In fiscal 2015, about 3,282,000 passengers used this station annually.

== Adjacent stations ==
«	Service	»
Arashiyama Line
Katsura	-	Matsuo-taisha
