= Hankyu 7300 series =

Japanese train type

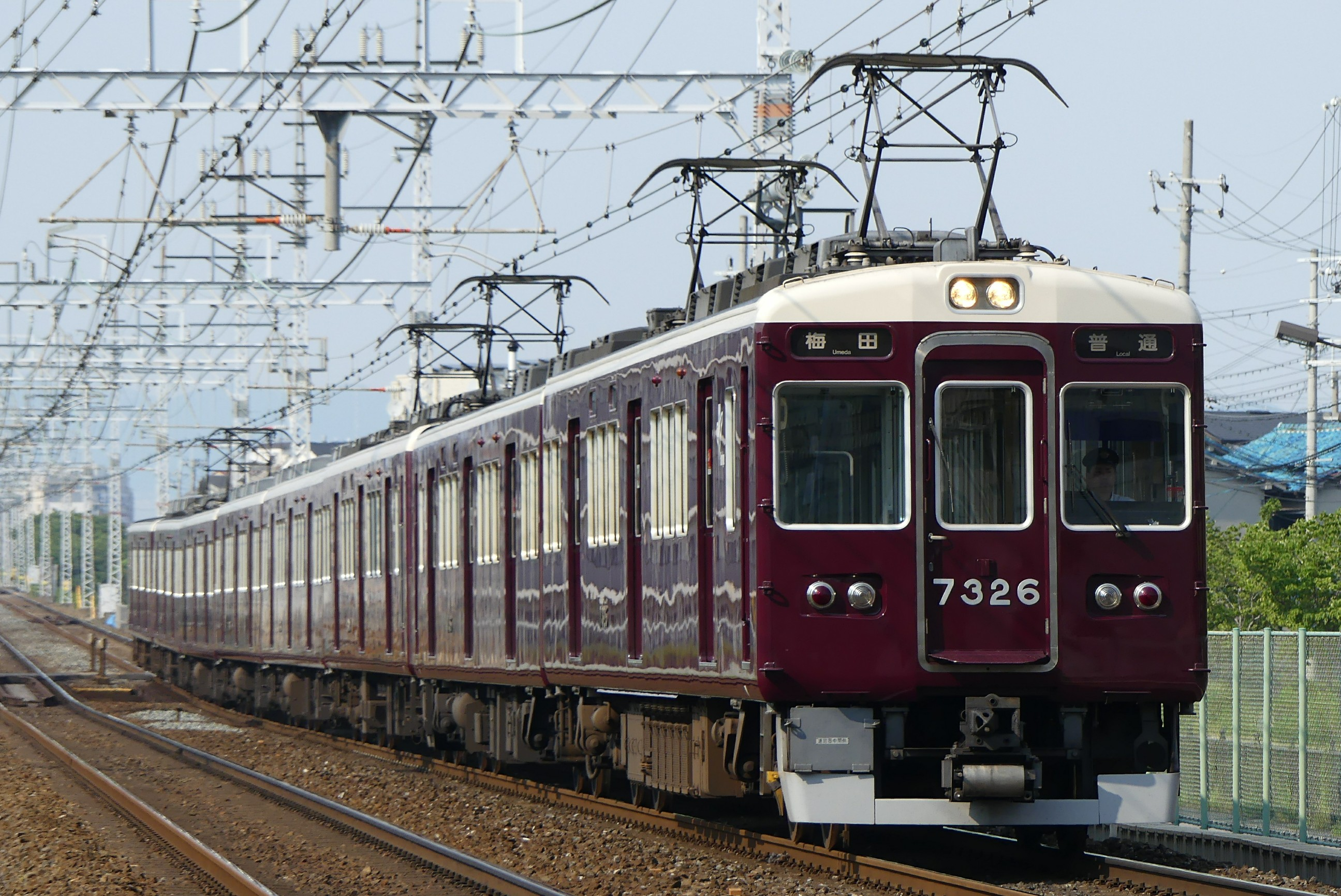
- A 7300 series train in original style in July 2018
- In service: 1982–
- Manufacturer: Alna Kōki
- Refurbished: 2008, 2014
- Number built: 83 vehicles (14 sets)
- Number in service: 82 vehicles (14 sets)
- Formation: 2/6/8 cars per trainset
- Operators: Hankyu Railway
- Depots: Katsura
- Lines served: Hankyu Kyoto Main Line; Hankyu Senri Line; Hankyu Arashiyama Line; Osaka Metro Sakaisuji Line

Specifications
- Car body construction: Steel; Aluminium alloy
- Car length: 18,900 mm (62 ft 0 in)
- Width: 2,800 mm (9 ft 2 in)
- Height: 4,095 mm (13 ft 5.2 in)
- Doors: 3 pairs per side
- Maximum speed: 115 km/h (70 mph)
- Traction system: Field chopper control Variable frequency GTO (7310, test run only); IGBT (Sets 7303, 7304, 7305, 7306, 7322, 7324)
- Power output: 150 kW (200 hp) / 180 kW (240 hp) per motor
- Electric system(s): 1,500 V DC overhead catenary
- Current collection: Pantograph
- Bogies: FS-369A, FS-069A
- Braking system(s): Regenerative brake Electronically controlled pneumatic brakes
- Safety system(s): ATS, ATC
- Coupling system: Shibata-type
- Multiple working: 8300 series, 9300 series
- Track gauge: 1,435 mm (4 ft 8 1/2 in)

The Hankyu 7300 series (阪急電鉄7300系) is an electric multiple unit (EMU) train type operated in Japan by the private railway operator Hankyu Railway since 1982.

== Formations ==
As of 1 April 2015, the fleet consists of 83 cars formed as eight-car, six-car, and two-car sets as follows, with one car spare.

=== 8-car sets ===
Car No.	1	2	3	4	5	6	7	8
Designation	Mc	M'	T	T	T	T	M	M'c
Type	Mc7300-1; Mc7300-2	M7800; M7800-2	T7850-1	T7850; T7850-1	T7850; T7850-1	T7850-1	M7900; M7900-2	Mc7400; Mc7400-2
Numbering	7300	7800	7850	7850	7850	7850	7900	7400
Designation	Mc	M'	T	To	To	T	M	M'c
Type	Mc7300-2	M7800-2	T7850-1	T7850-1	T7850-1	T7850-1	M7900-2	Mc7400-2
Numbering	7300	7840	7850	7950	7890	7850	7900	7400

- The "Mc" and "M" cars are each fitted with two scissors-type pantographs.

=== 2+6-car sets ===
Car No.	1	2	3	4	5	6	7	8
Designation	Mc	Tc	Mc	M'	T	T	M	M'c
Type	Mc7300-1	Tc7450-1	Mc7300-1	M7800; M7800-1	T7850; T7850-1	T7850; T7850-1	M7900-1	M'c7400; M'c7400-1
Numbering	7300	7450	7300	7800	7850	7850	7900	7400

- The "Mc" and "M" cars are each fitted with two scissors-type pantographs.

=== 2-car sets ===
Car No.	1	2
Designation	Mc	Tc
Type	Mc7300-1	Tc7450-1
Numbering	7300	7450

- The "Mc" cars are each fitted with two scissors-type pantographs.

== Interior ==
Passenger accommodation consists of longitudinal bench seating throughout.

== History ==
The 7300 series trains were introduced from 1982.

=== Refurbishment ===
Refurbishments have been carried out for the 7300 series fleet since 2008.

The first set to be refurbished, 8-car set 7320, returned to service on 8 September 2008. It received a restyled front end with LED destination displays, as well as LCD information displays in the interior.

Eight-car set 7303 was the second set to be refurbished, returning to service on 15 July 2014. This set was retrofitted with a VVVF traction control system similar to that of the then-new 1300 series trains, and it also received other external and internal upgrades. Subsequently treated sets have followed this set's specifications.

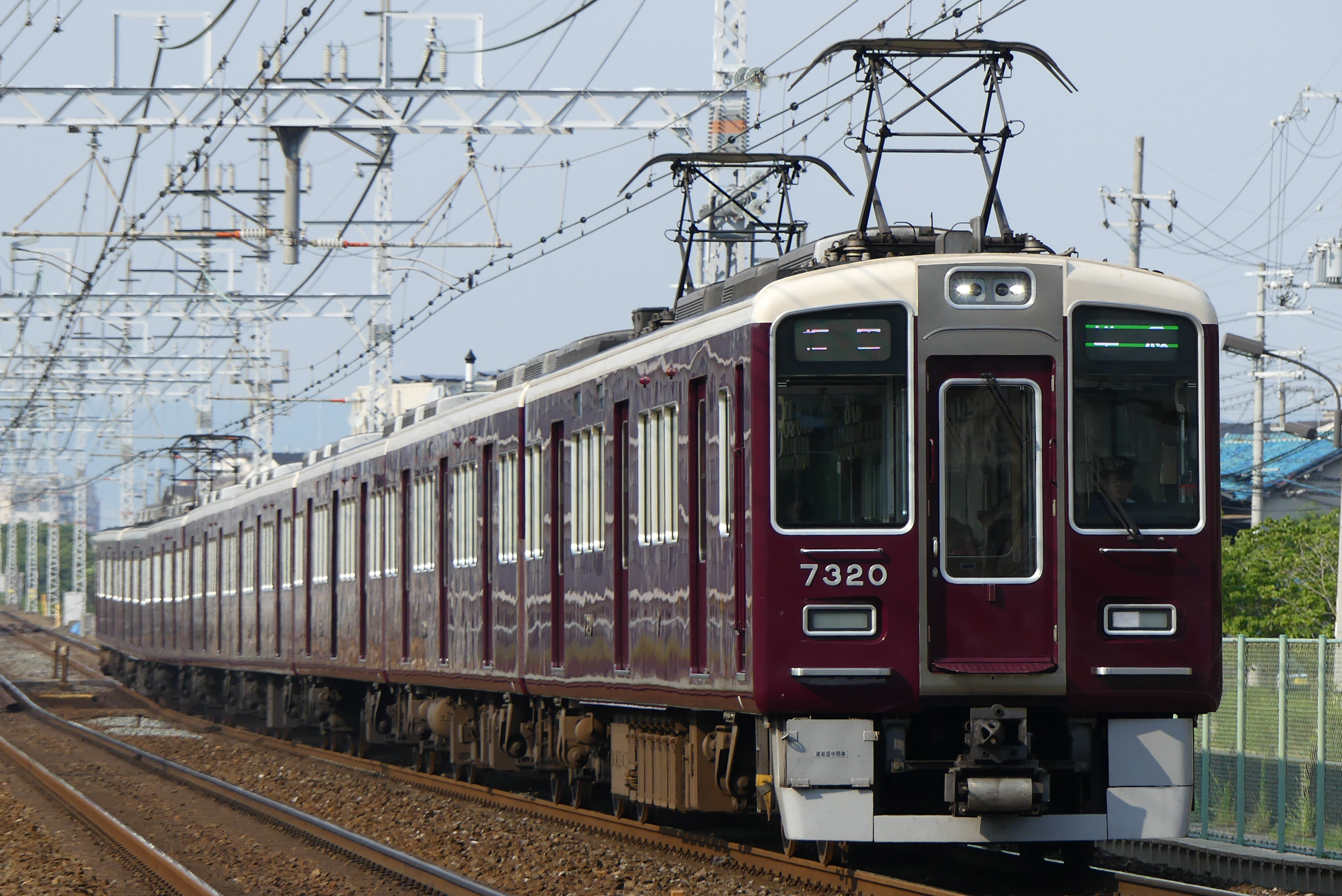
The first refurbished set, set 7320, in July 2018

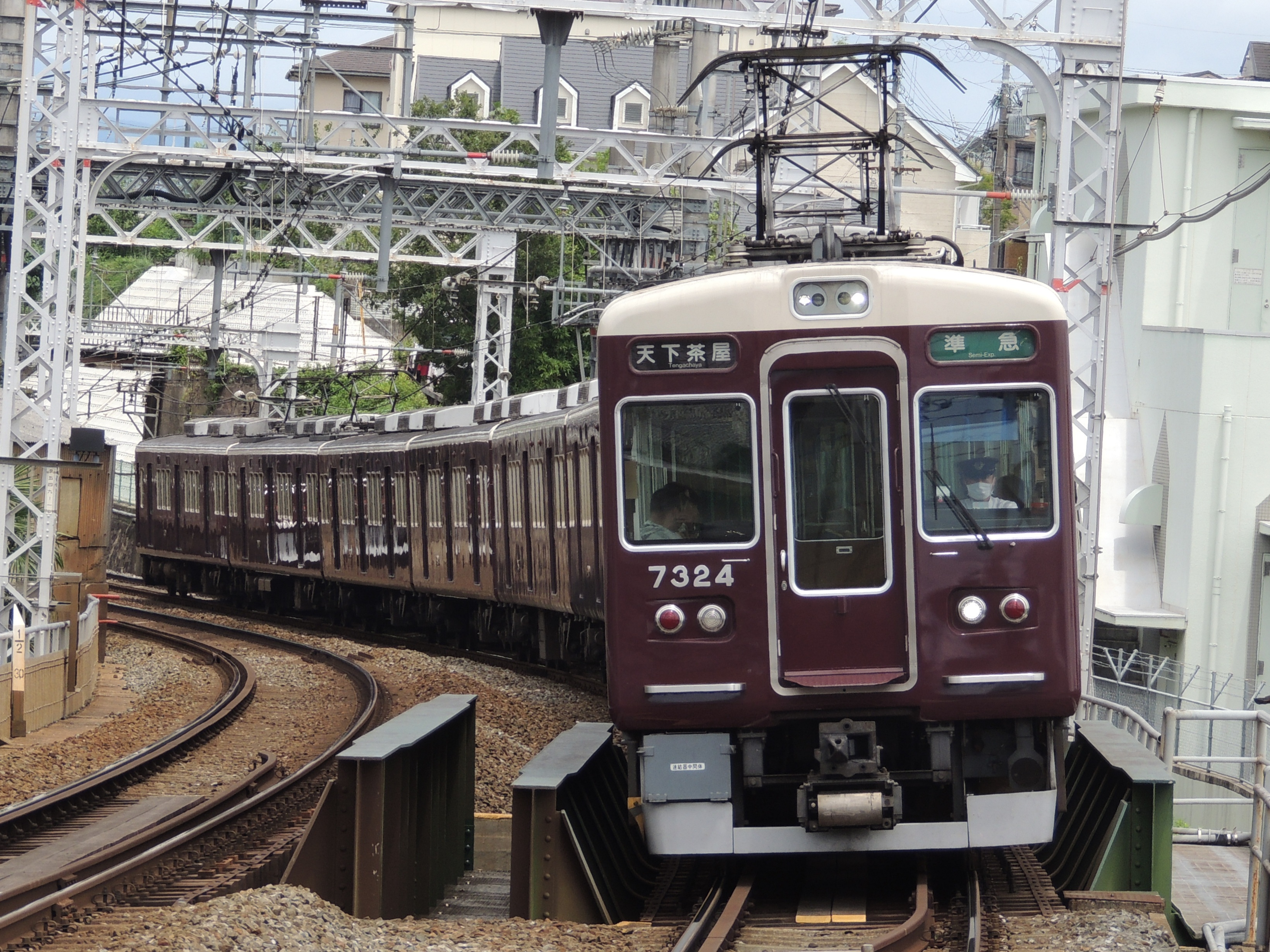
Refurbished set 7324
