= 6300 series =

6300 series may refer to:

== Train types ==
- Toei 6300 series electric multiple unit
- Hankyu 6300 series electric multiple unit
