= Matsuo-taisha Station =

Railway station in Kyoto, Japan

Coordinates: 35°0′2.27″N 135°41′16.79″E

Matsuo-taisha Station 松尾大社駅
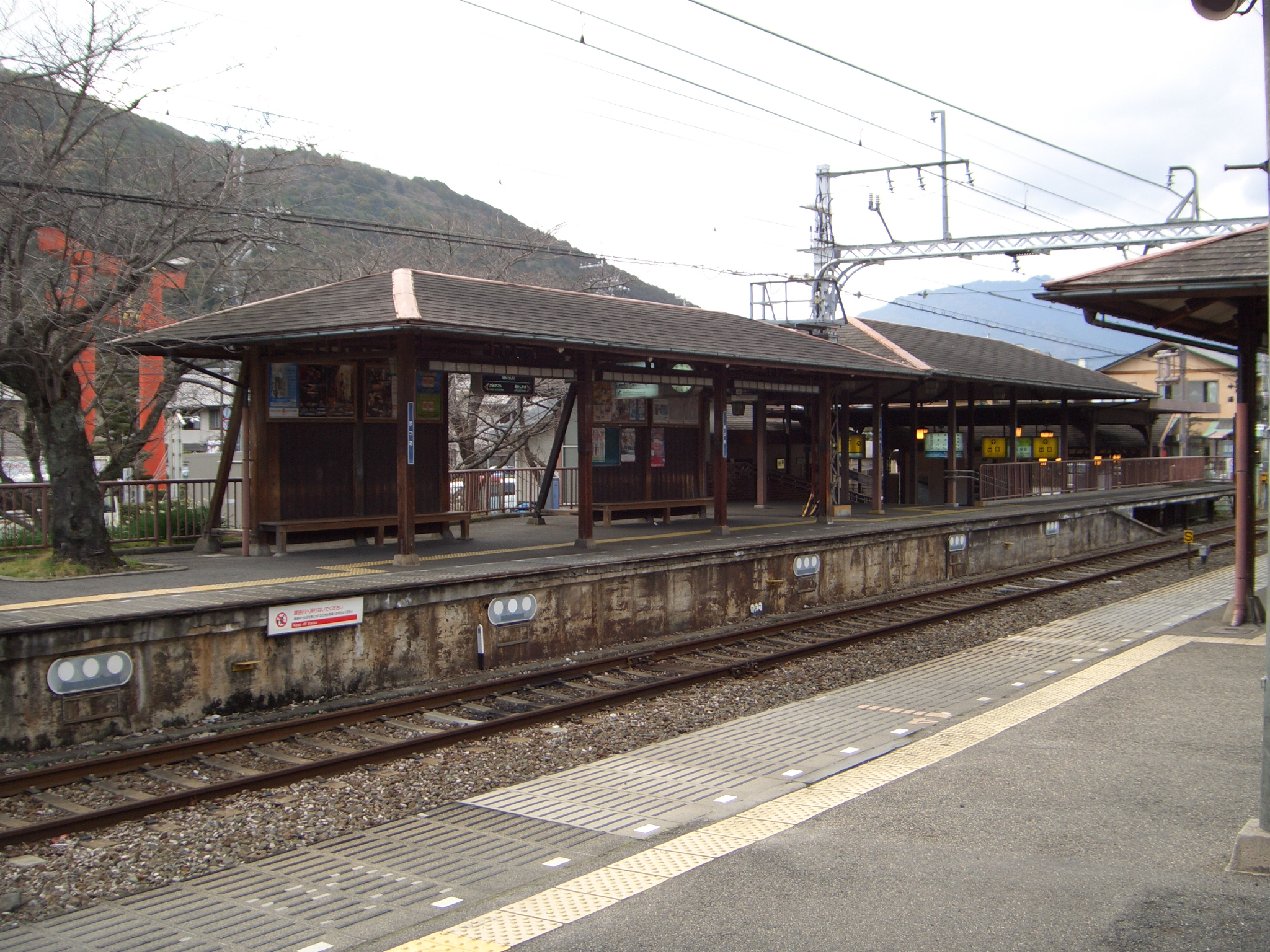
- Unique platform shelter in rustic style

General information
- Location: Nishikyō, Kyoto, Kyoto; Japan
- Operator: Hankyu Corporation
- Line: Arashiyama Line

Other information
- Station code: HK-97

History
- Opened: 1928
- Former names: Matsuo Jinja-mae; Matsuo (until 2013)

Passengers
- FY2015: 2.1 million
Location

Matsuo-taisha Station (松尾大社駅, Matsuo-taisha-eki) on the Hankyu Arashiyama Line is located a short walk from both the Katsura River and Matsunoo Shrine in Kyoto. During the late fall, the Momiji trees that line the station provide a spectacular display of red, orange, and yellow leaves. The station is accessible by wheelchairs although passengers of Katsura-bound trains have to use a special gate for wheelchairs.

Kyoto Bus #73 to Kyoto Station also connects to the station.

== History ==
The station opened on November 9, 1928, when the Arashiyama Line started operation. It was called Matsuo Jinja-mae Station (松尾神社前駅, Matsuo-jinja-mae-eki), referring to Matsuo Shrine, until 1948 and then Matsuo Station (松尾駅, Matsuo-eki) until 2013. The present name is from December 21, 2013.
