= Hankyu 6300 series =

Japanese train type

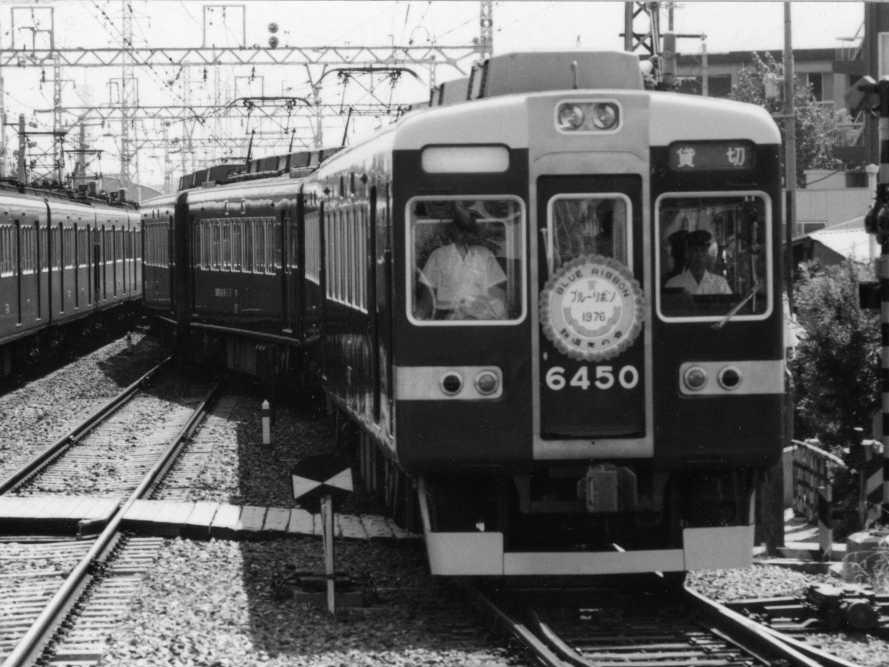
- A 6300 series train in original style before 1976
- In service: 1975–
- Manufacturer: Alna Kōki
- Replaced: 2800 series, 2300 series
- Refurbished: 2008–2011
- Number built: 72 vehicles (9 sets)
- Number in service: 12 vehicles (3 sets)
- Number preserved: 1 vehicle
- Number scrapped: 59 vehicles
- Formation: 4 (previously 6/8) cars per trainset
- Operators: Hankyu Railway
- Depots: Katsura
- Lines served: Hankyu Arashiyama Line; Hankyu Kyoto Main Line (formerly)

Specifications
- Car body construction: Steel
- Doors: 2 pairs per side
- Maximum speed: 110 km/h (68 mph)
- Traction system: Resistor control; Field chopper control (set 6330)
- Power output: 140 kW (188 hp) / 150 kW (201 hp) per motor
- Electric system(s): 1,500 V DC overhead catenary
- Current collection: Pantograph
- Bogies: FS369A, FS069A
- Braking system(s): Dynamic brake Regenerative brake (set 6330); Electronically controlled pneumatic brakes
- Safety system(s): ATS
- Coupling system: Shibata-Type; Knuckle-Type
- Track gauge: 1,435 mm (4 ft 8 1/2 in)

Notes/references
- This train won the 19th Blue Ribbon Award in 1976.

The Hankyu 6300 series (阪急電鉄6300系, Hankyū Dentetsu 6300-kei) is an electric multiple unit (EMU) train type operated in Japan by the private railway operator Hankyu Railway since 1975.

== Formations ==
=== 4-car sets ===
The three 4-car sets, numbered 6351 to 6353, are formed as follows, with two motored (M) cars and two unpowered trailer (T) cars.

Designation	Tc	M	M'	Tc
Type	Tc6350	M6800	M'6900	Tc6450
Numbering	6350	6800	6900	6450

The "M" cars are fitted with two scissors-type pantographs.

=== 8-car sets ===
Designation	Tc	M	M'	T	T	M	M'	Tc
Numbering	6350	6800	6900	6850	6860	6810	6910	6450
Designation	Mc	M'	T	T	T	T	M	M'c
Numbering	6330	6930	6950	6960	6970	6980	6830	6430

=== 6-car sets ===
The two 6-car sets remaining as of 1 April 2012, numbered 6350 and 6354 (Kyo-Train), were formed as follows, with four motored (M) cars and two unpowered trailer (T) cars. In February 2016, set 6350 (excluding car 6350) was sent to scrap.

Designation	Tc	M	M'	M	M'	Tc
Type	Tc6350	M6800	M'6900	M6800	M'6900	Tc6450
Numbering	6350	6800	6900	6800	6900	6450

The two "M" cars were each fitted with two scissors-type pantographs.

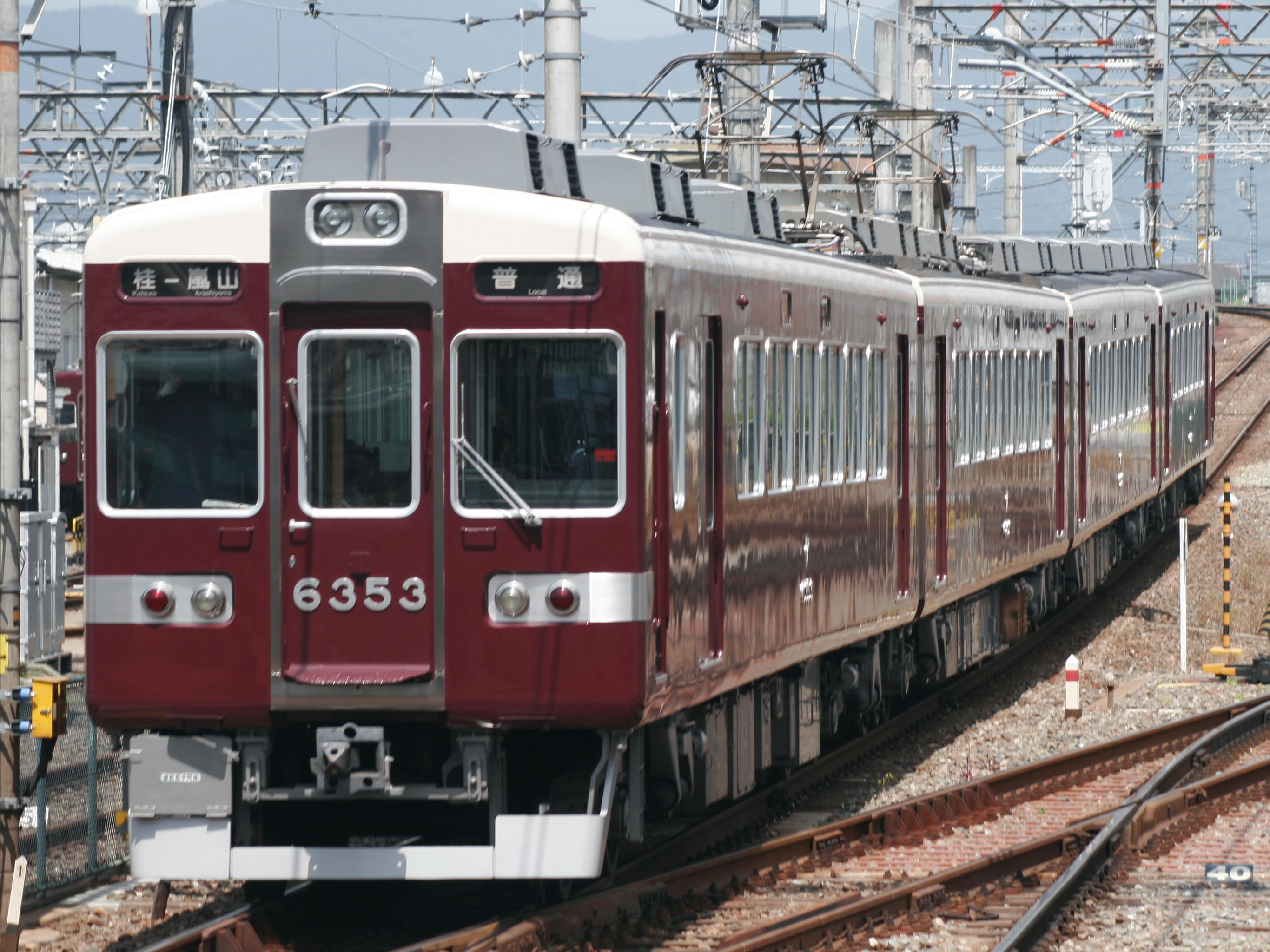
Arashiyama Line refurbished set

== History ==
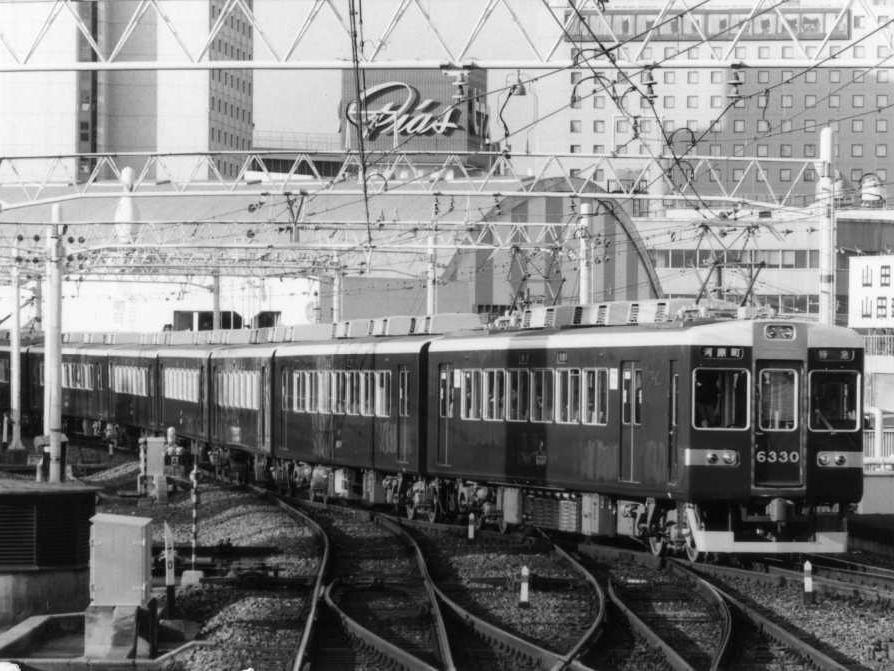
Set 6330 in January 1984

The Hankyu 6300 series were originally built for limited express services on the Hankyu Kyoto Main Line starting in 1975, displacing the 2800 series previously used on these services. Production continued until 1978.

The Hankyu 6300 series was awarded the 1976 Blue Ribbon Award of the Japan Railfan Club.

In 1983, following the completion of the rail viaduct between Ibaraki-shi and Takatsuki-shi stations, an additional 8-car set numbered 6330 was constructed, entering service on 1 January 1984. This set used field chopper control technology together with regenerative braking systems. It was withdrawn from service in around 2009.

On 2 April 2009, sets 6351-6353 entered service on the Arashiyama Line as 4-car sets. They were refurbished from 2008 with new interior panels and transverse seating arranged in a 2+1 abreast configuration along with some longitudinal seating near the doors.

The last remaining 8-car sets were removed from regularly scheduled limited express services on the Kyoto Main Line on 8 January 2010, with the official final operations taking place from 21 to 28 February of the same year.

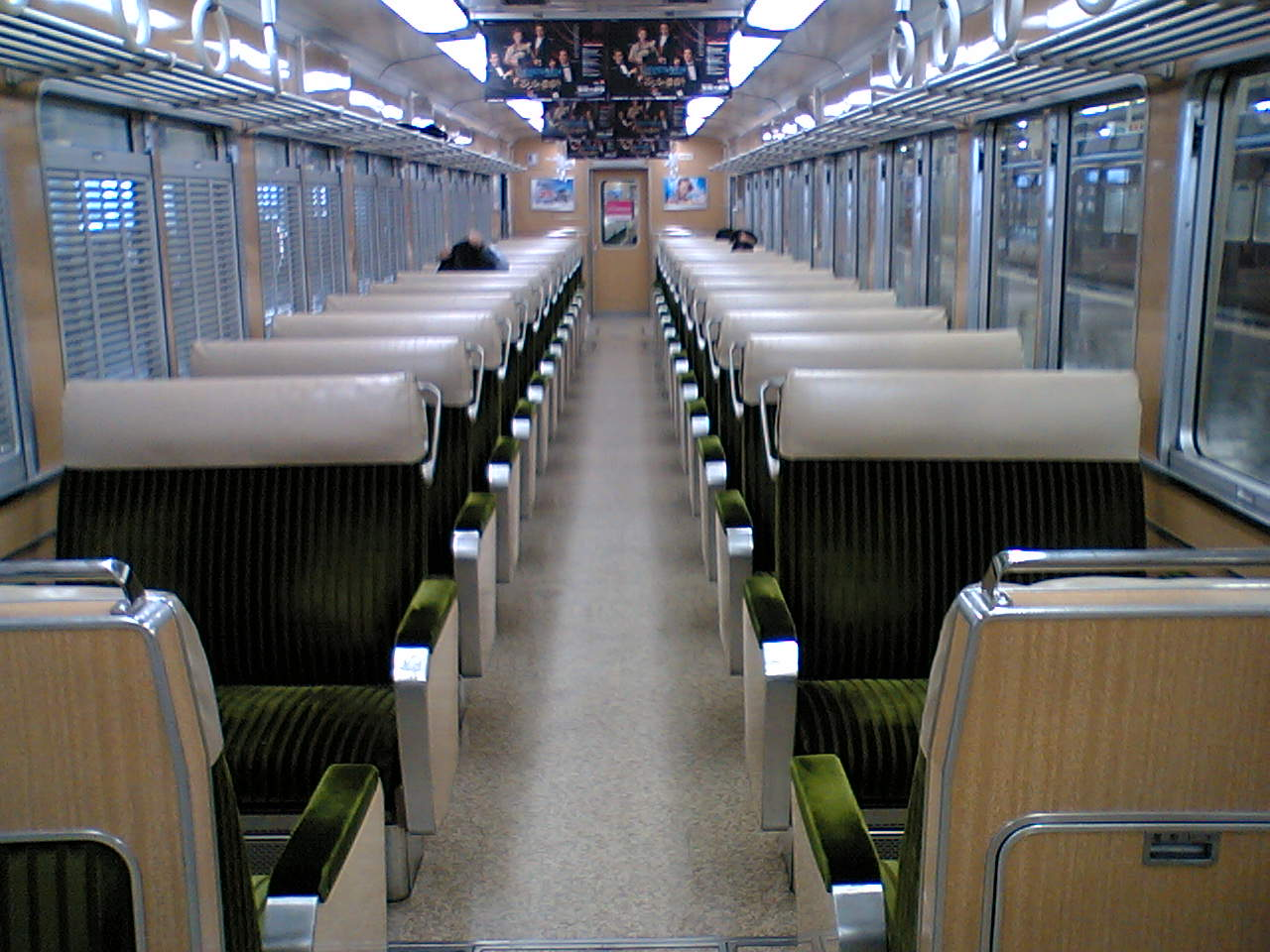
Original interior of a Kyoto Main Line set

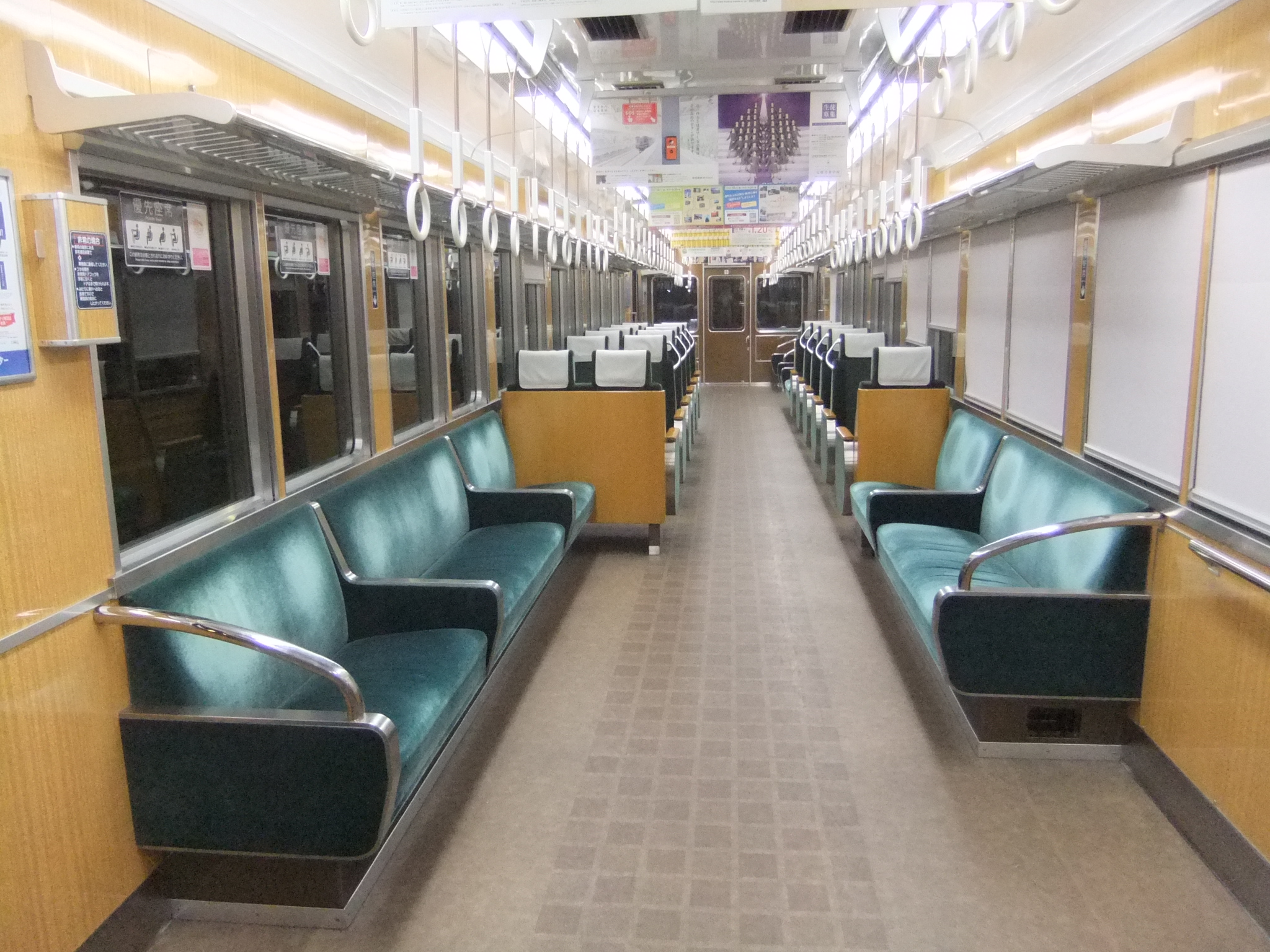
Interior of a refurbished Arashiyama Line set

== Kyo-Train ==
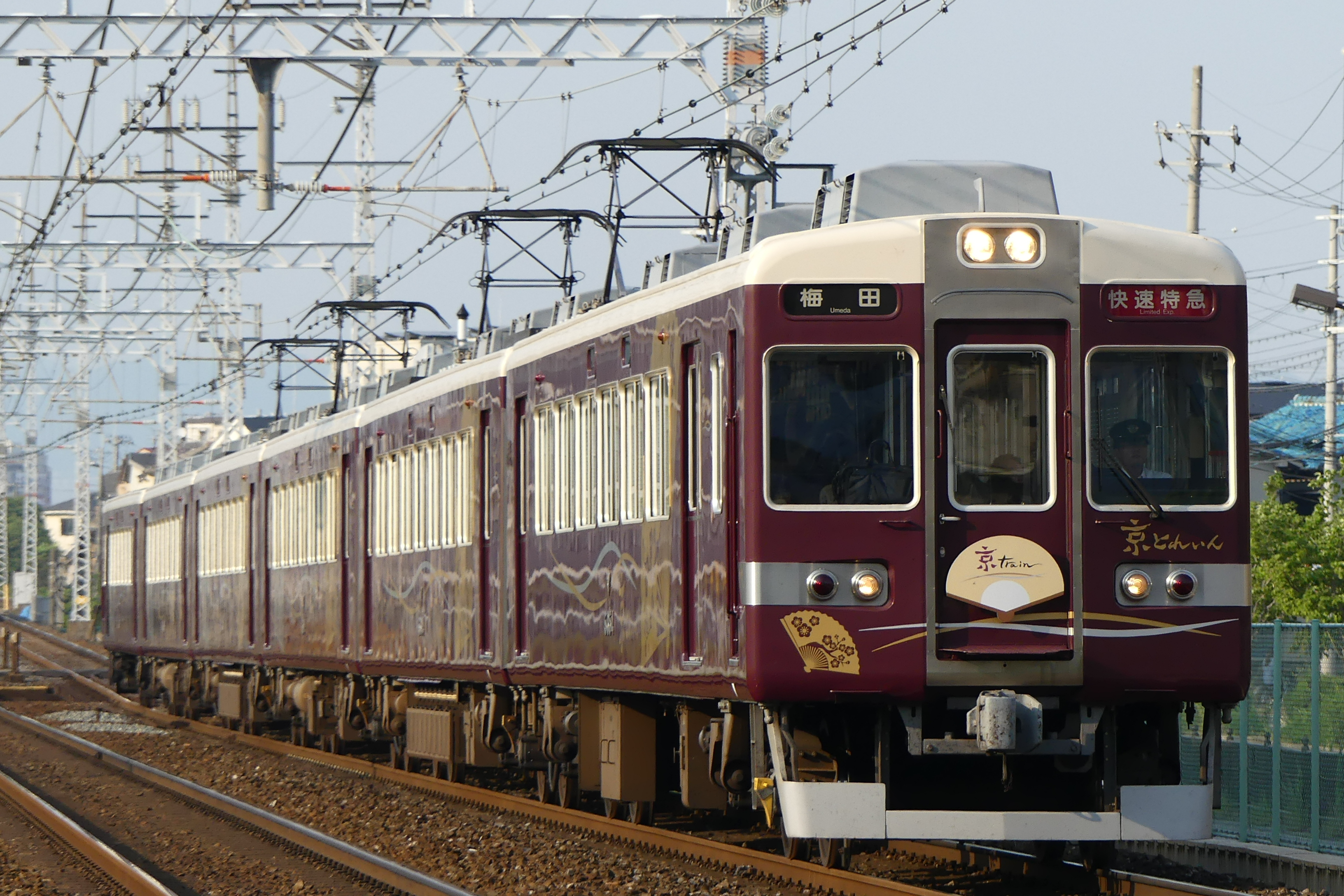
Kyo-train set 6354 in July 2018

On 21 February 2011, Hankyu Railway announced that they would introduce a sightseeing train branded "Kyo-Train" (京とれいん) on the Kyoto Main Line. The set was composed of set 6354, which was shortened to a 6-car train and put into service on 19 March 2011. In addition, it began operating on regularly scheduled Rapid Limited Express services on weekends and holidays since 14 May of the same year. From the start of the revised timetable implemented on 19 January 2019, and with the installation of platform screen doors at Jūsō Station, a dedicated service for the Kyo-Train named Rapid Limited Express A, which skipped that station, was set up. However, set 6354 only ran on this service from 23 February 2019 following a round of inspections.

The 6-car Kyo-Train was discontinued from the start of Hankyu's revised timetable implemented on 17 December 2022.

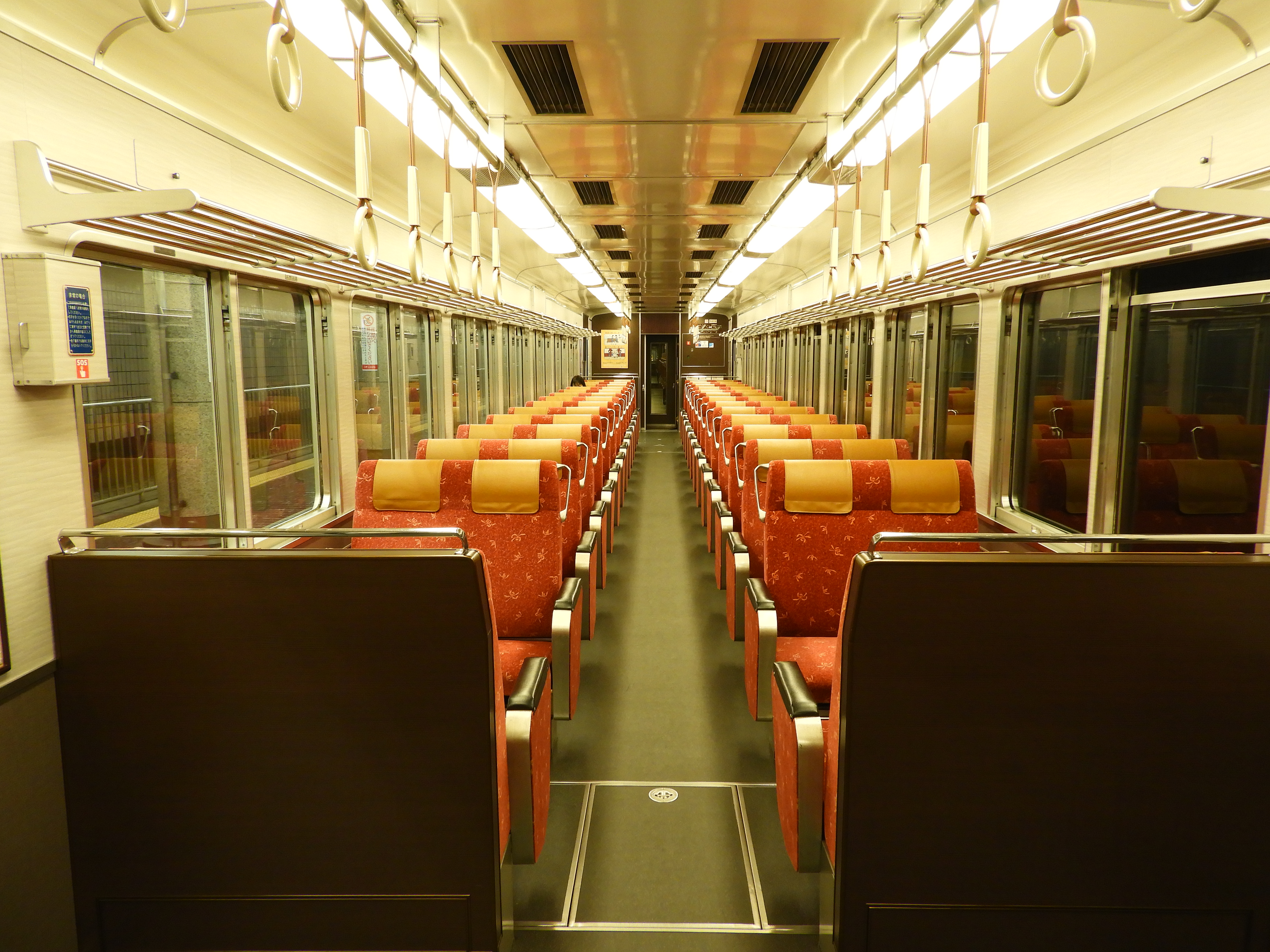
Interior of cars 1 and 2

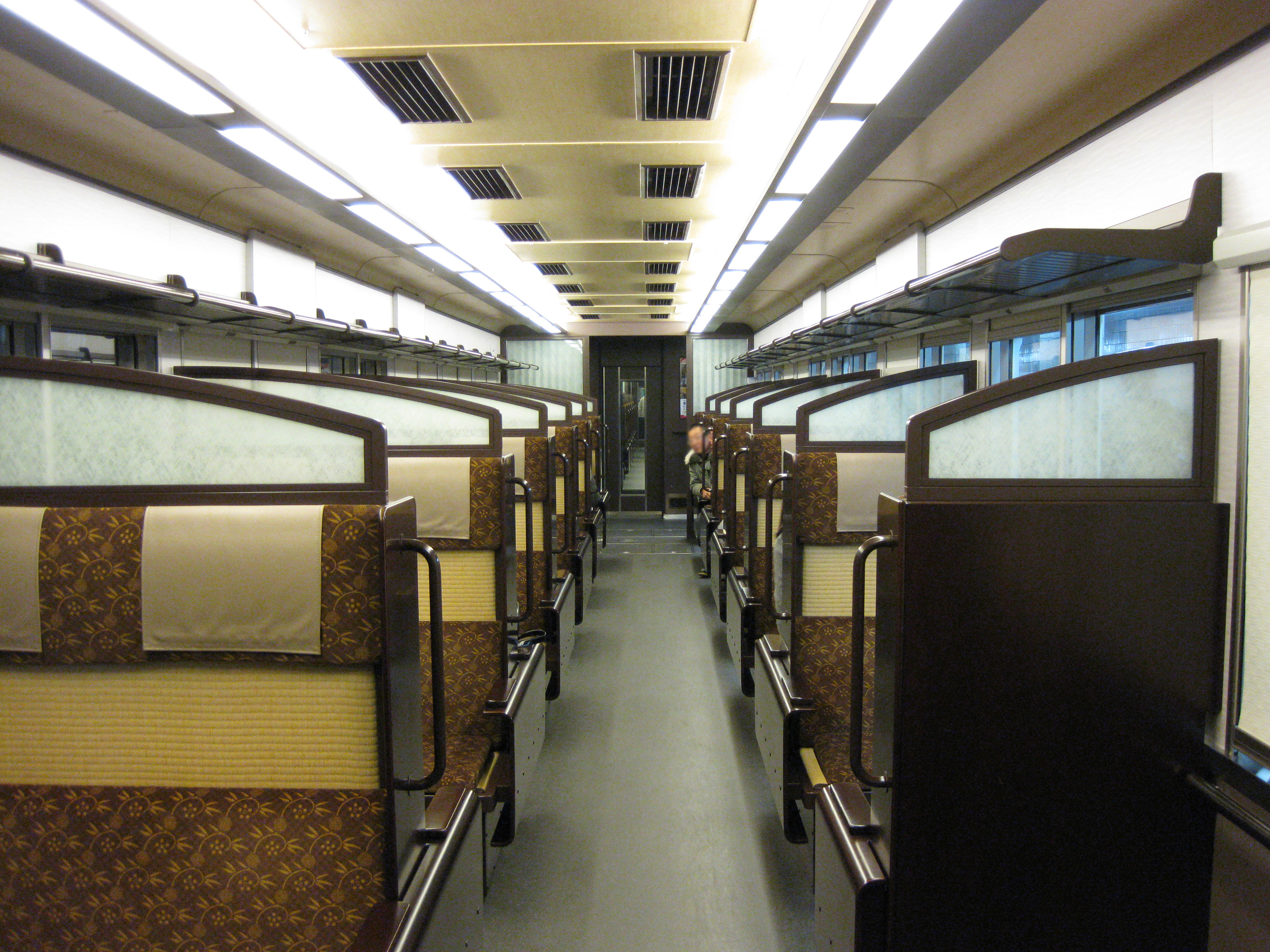
Interior of cars 3 and 4

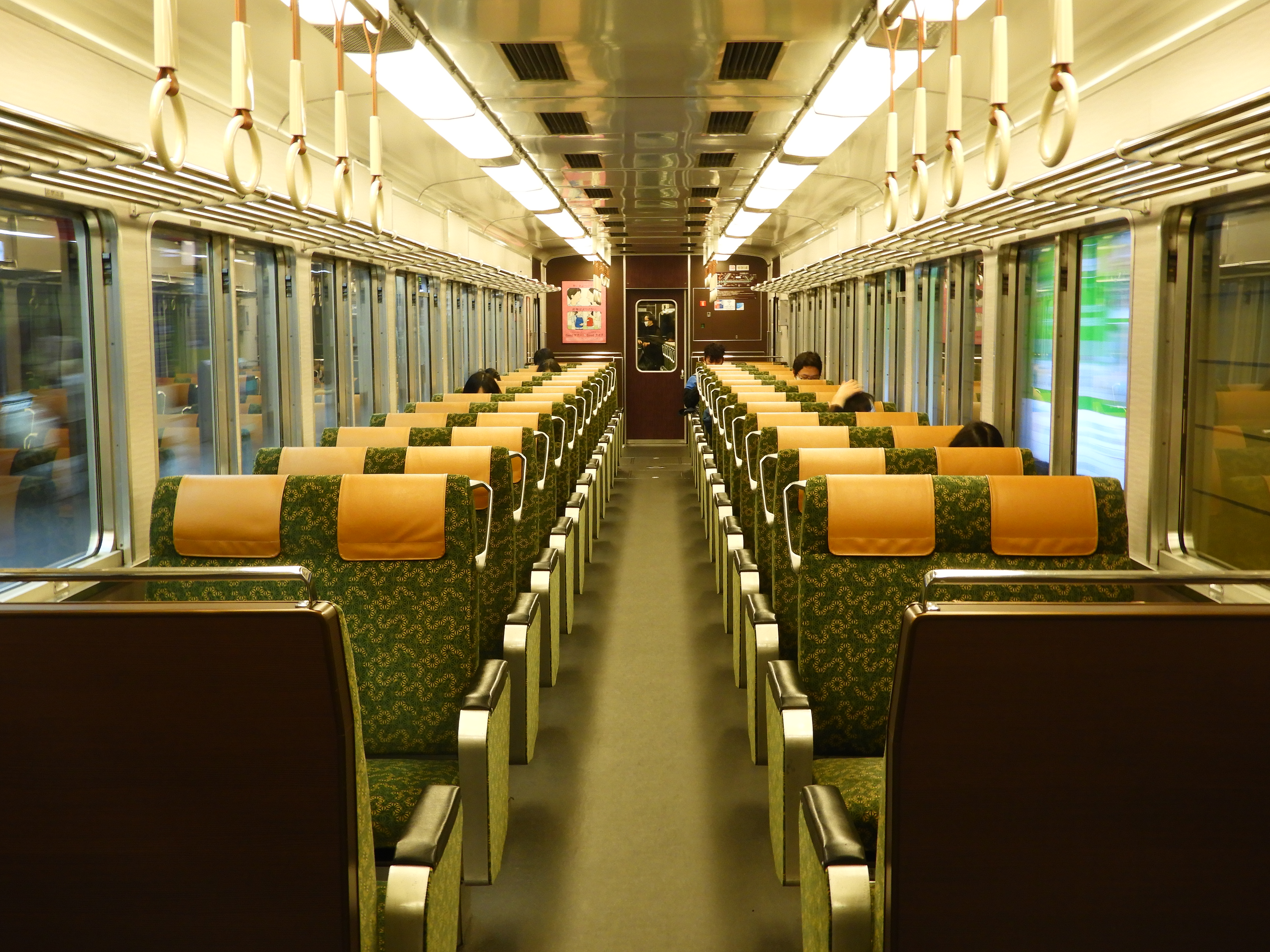
Interior of cars 5 and 6
