= Hankyu Arashiyama Line =

Railway line in Kyoto, Japan

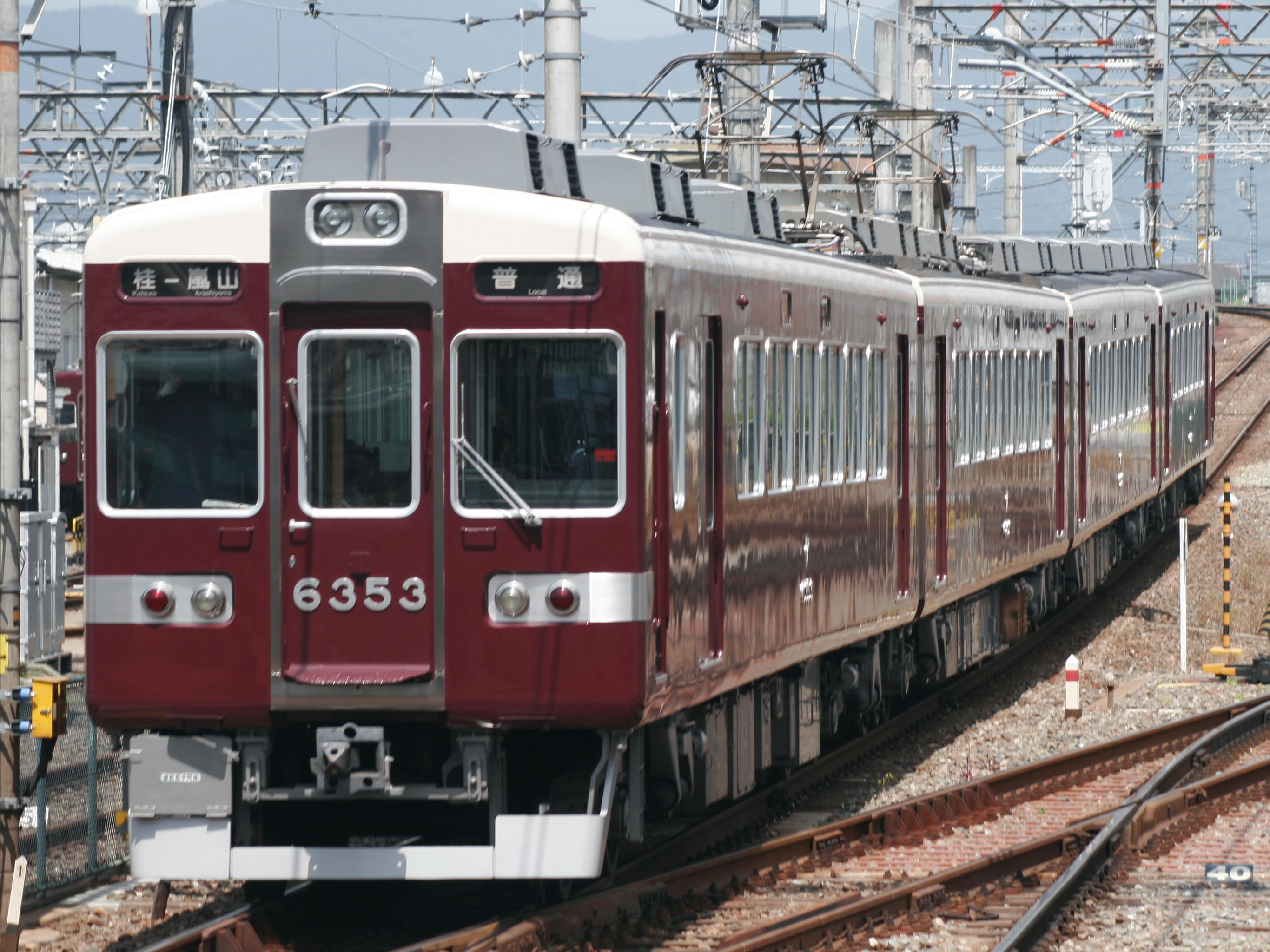
- Arashiyama Line train (6300 series)

Overview
- Native name: 阪急嵐山線
- Locale: Kansai
- Termini: Katsura; Arashiyama
- Stations: 4

Service
- Operator(s): Hankyu Railway
- Depot(s): Katsura

History
- Opened: 9 November 1928; 97 years ago

Technical
- Line length: 4.1 km (2.5 mi)
- Number of tracks: Single
- Track gauge: 1,435 mm (4 ft 8 1/2 in)
- Electrification: 1,500 V DC, overhead line
- Operating speed: 70 km/h (43 mph)

The Hankyu Arashiyama Line (嵐山線, Arashiyama-sen) is a railway line in Kyoto, Japan, operated by private railway operator Hankyu Railway. It connects Katsura and Arashiyama on the west side of the city, linking the area along the line to the Hankyu Kyoto Main Line that extends east to central Kyoto and south to Osaka. The line is 4.1 km long.

Trains on the line mainly use 4-car Hankyu 6300 series electric multiple unit trains, which were originally built for limited express services on the main line from 1975 and refurbished for Arashiyama Line services from 2009.

== History ==
The line opened as 1435mm gauge dual track electrified at 1500 VDC in November 1928.

One line of the dual track was removed in 1944 for metal collection as part of the Japanese war effort. Crossing loops at both intermediate stations were built in 1950.

Driver-only operation is scheduled to be introduced on the line in 2027. Two 8300 series 4-car sets were introduced on the line in 2026 to facilitate such operation.

== Stations ==
No.	Station	Japanese	Distance (km)	Transfers	Places of interest
HK-81	Katsura	桂	0.0	Hankyu Kyoto Main Line	
HK-96	Kami-Katsura	上桂	1.4		Nishikyo Ward Office, Saihō-ji Temple
HK-97	Matsuo-taisha	松尾大社	2.8		Matsunoo Shrine, Umemiya Shrine
HK-98	Arashiyama	嵐山 (嵯峨野)	4.1		Arashiyama Park

All four stations on the line are in Nishikyo-ku, Kyoto. While the entire line is single track, both the intermediate stations are equipped with crossing loops.
