= Hankyu 8300 series =

Japanese train type

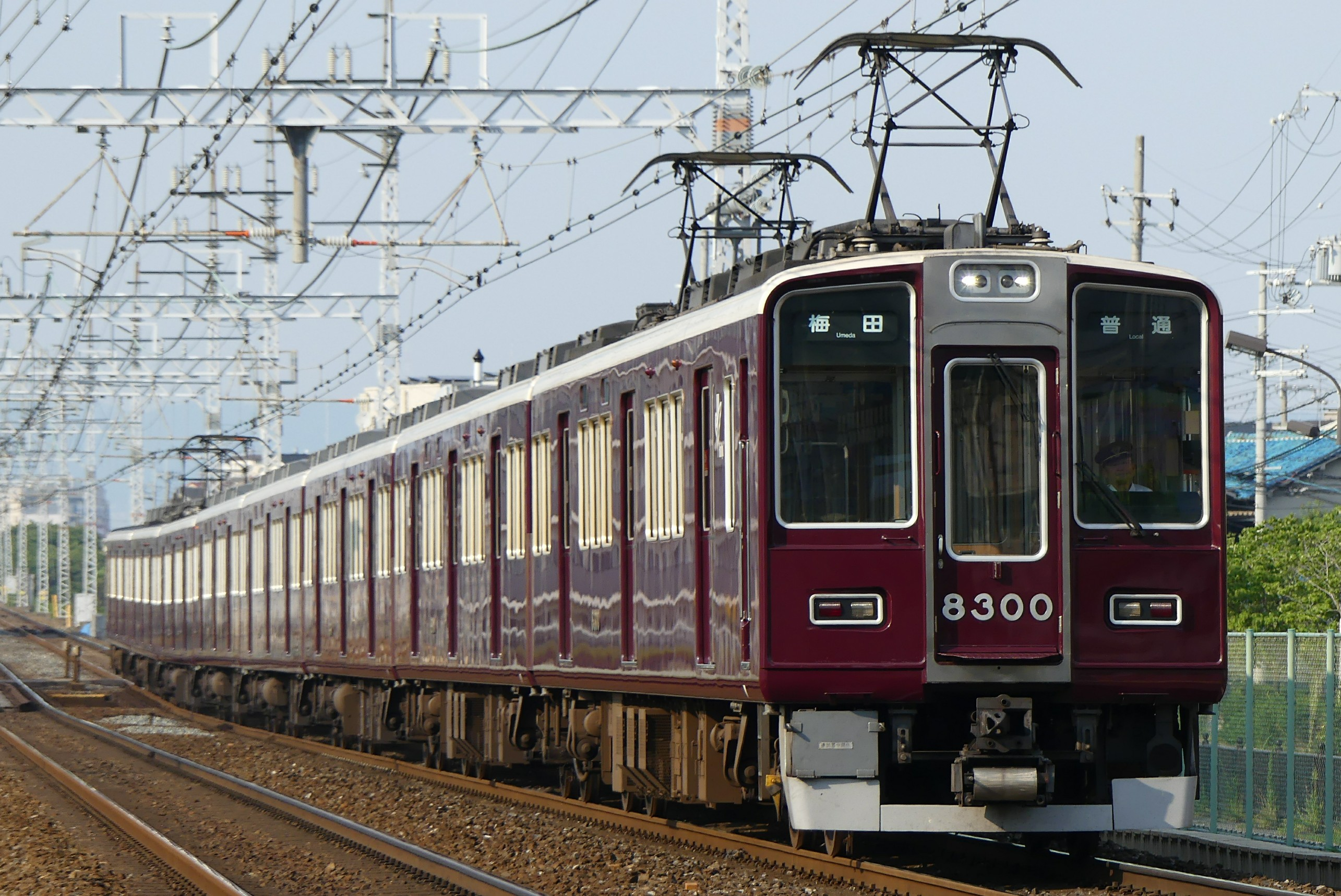
- 8-car set 8300 on a local service, July 2019
- In service: 1989–present
- Manufacturer: Alna Kōki
- Refurbished: 2023–
- Number built: 84 vehicles (15 sets)
- Number in service: 84 vehicles (15 sets)
- Formation: 2/4/6/8 cars per trainset
- Operator: Hankyu Railway
- Depot: Katsura
- Lines served: Hankyu Kyoto Main Line; Hankyu Senri Line; Hankyu Arashiyama Line; Osaka Metro Sakaisuji Line

Specifications
- Car body construction: Aluminium alloy
- Car length: 18,900 mm (62 ft 0 in)
- Width: 2,850 mm (9 ft 4 in)
- Height: 4,095 mm (13 ft 5.2 in)
- Doors: 3 pairs per side
- Maximum speed: 115 km/h (71 mph)
- Traction system: Variable frequency (GTO)
- Power output: 170 kW (228 hp) per motor
- Electric system: 1,500 V DC overhead catenary
- Current collection: Pantograph
- Bogies: FS-369A, FS-069A; SS-139A, SS-039A
- Braking system: Electronically controlled pneumatic brakes with regenerative braking
- Safety systems: ATS, ATC
- Coupling system: Shibata-type
- Multiple working: 7300 series
- Track gauge: 1,435 mm (4 ft 8 1/2 in)

The Hankyu 8300 series (阪急電鉄8300系) is an electric multiple unit (EMU) train type operated in Japan by the private railway operator Hankyu Railway since 1989.

== Formations ==
As of 1 April 2012, the fleet consists of 84 vehicles formed as five 8-car sets, four 6+2-car sets, and two 6-car sets which normally run coupled with 2-car 7300 series sets.

4-car sets began operation in 2026.

=== 8-car sets ===
Car No.	1	2	3	4	5	6	7	8
Designation	Mc1	M2	T1	T2	T2	T1	M1	Mc2
Numbering	8300	8900	8850	8950	8980	8870	8800	8400

- The "Mc1" and "M1" cars are each fitted with two scissors-type pantographs.
- The "Mc1" and "M1" cars of set 8315 are each fitted with two single-arm pantographs.
- Sets from 8303 onward have a modified front end design.

=== 2+6-car sets ===
Car No.	1	2	3	4	5	6	7	8
Designation	Mc1	Tc	Mc1	T1	T2	T1	M1	Mc2
Numbering	8330	8450	8300	8850	8950	8870	8800	8400

- The "Mc1" and "M1" cars are each fitted with two scissors-type pantographs.

=== 2+6-car mixed 7300/8300 series sets ===
Car No.	1	2	3	4	5	6	7	8
Designation	Mc	Tc	Mc1	T1	T2	T1	M1	Mc2
Numbering	7300	7450	8300	8850	8950	8870	8800	8400

- The "Mc", "Mc1", and "M1" cars are each fitted with two scissors-type pantographs.
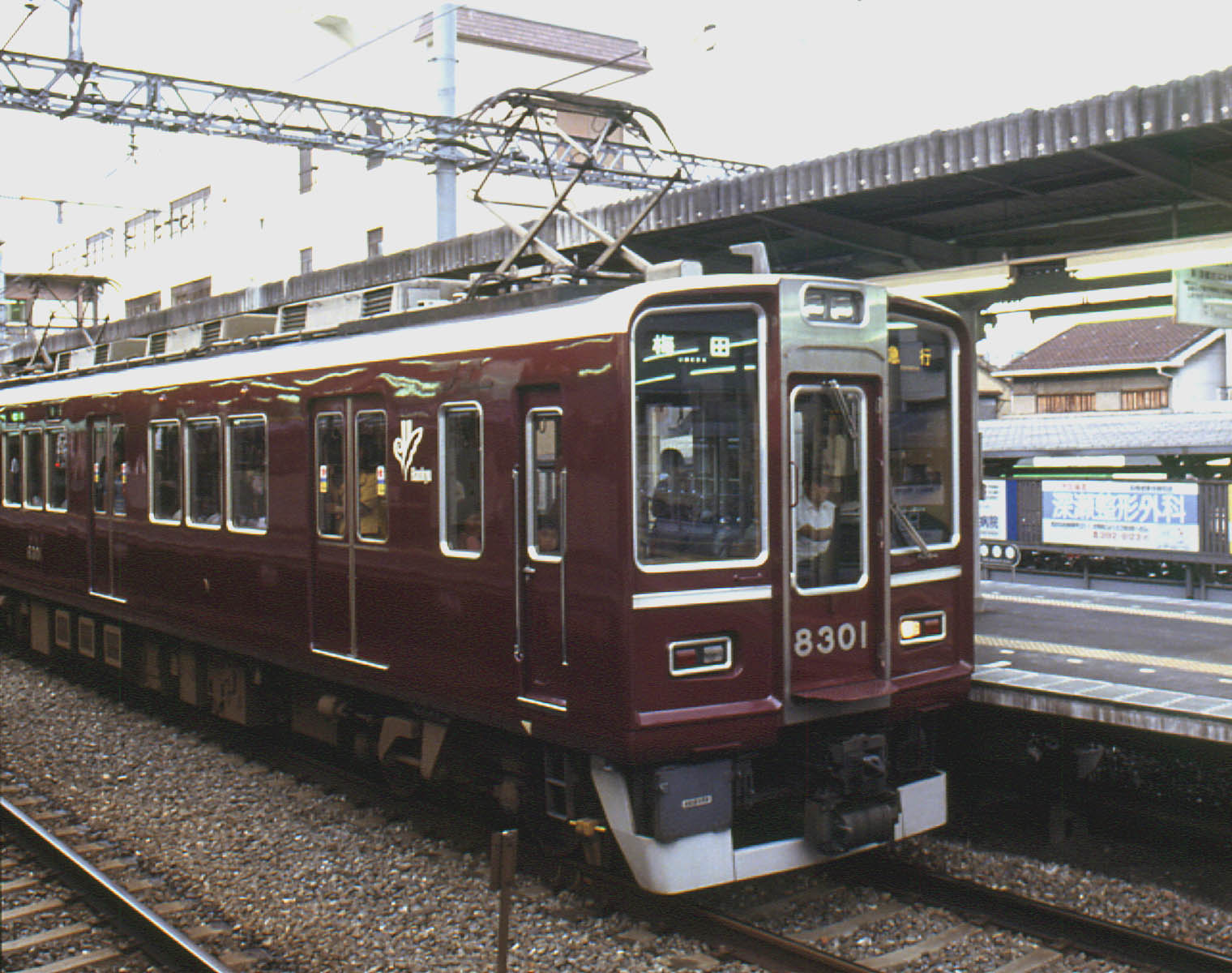
8300 series in original style before 1995

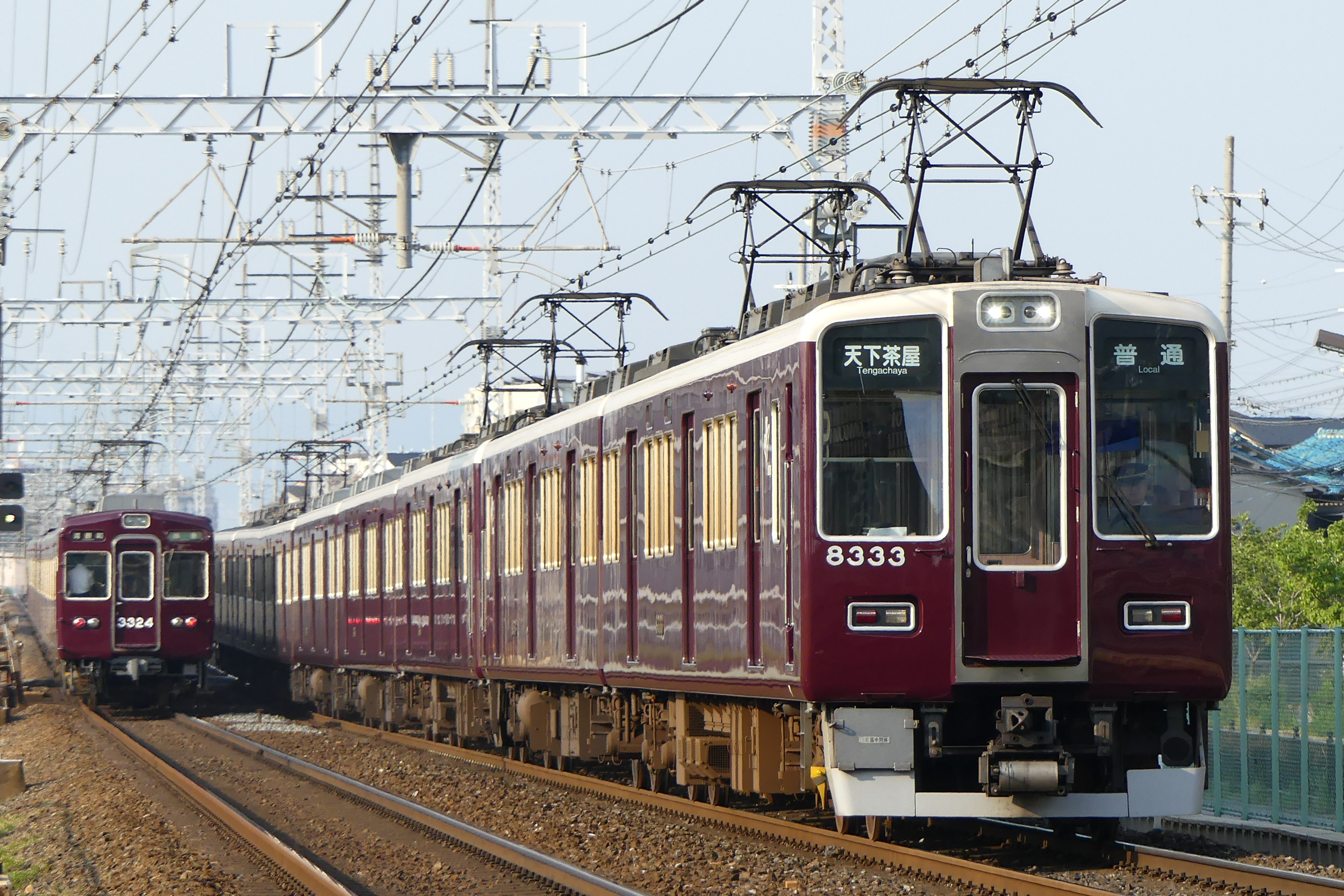
8300 series second build train, July 2018

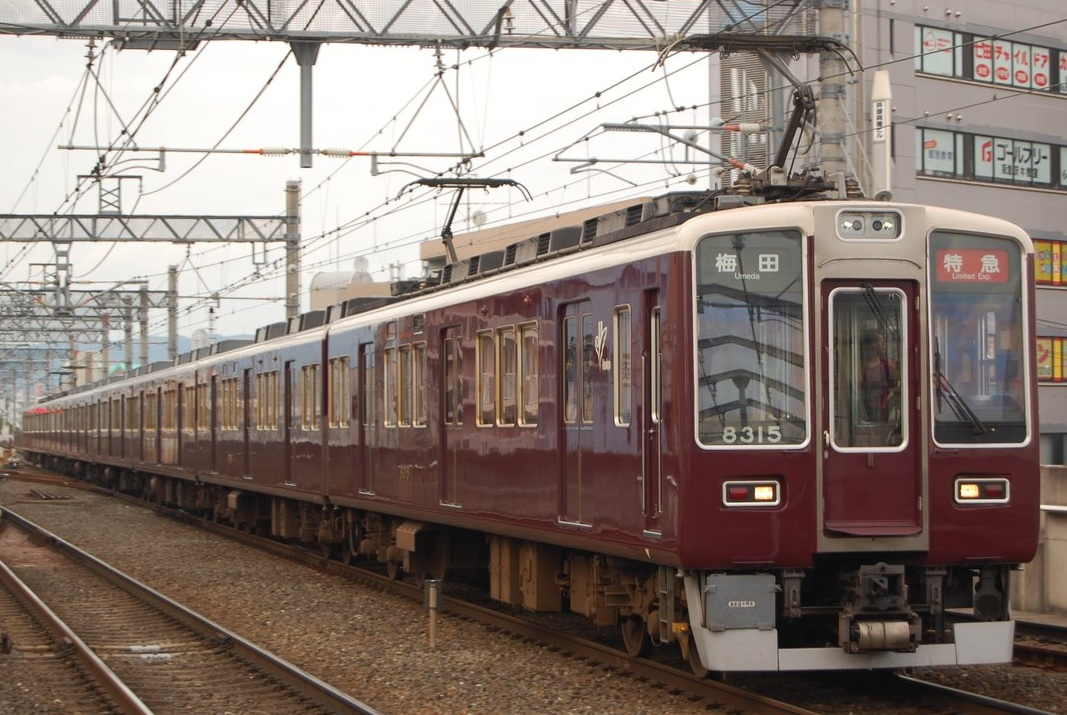
8-car set 8315 with single-arm pantographs, July 2017

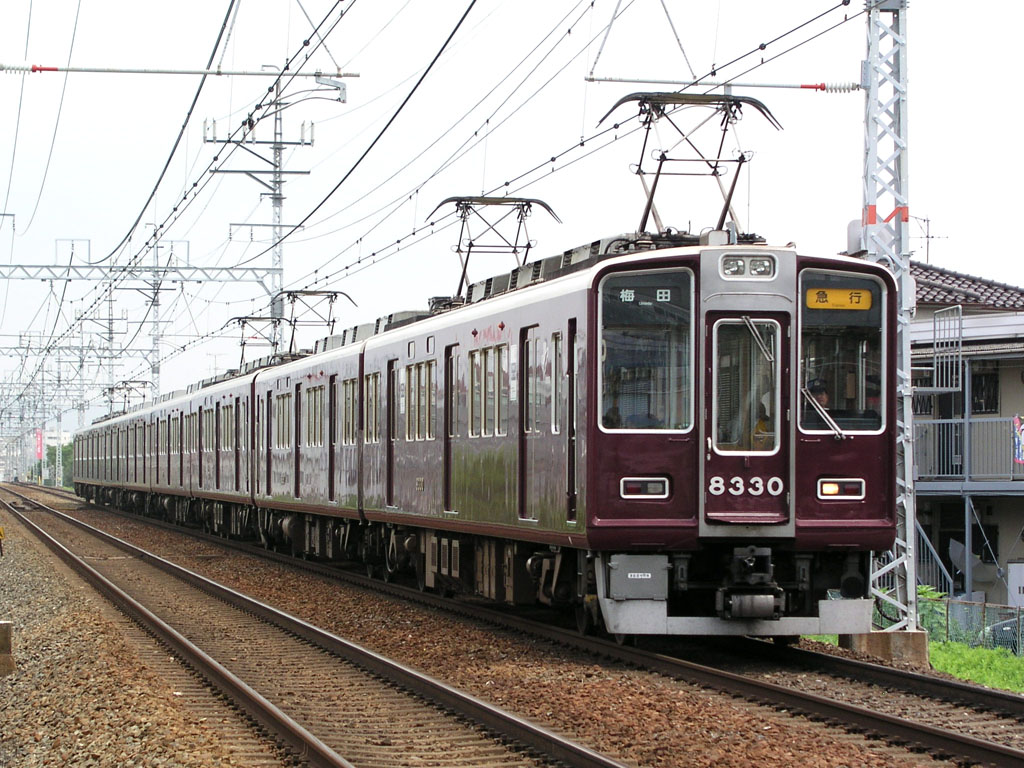
Set 8330 leading a 2+6-car formation, July 2006

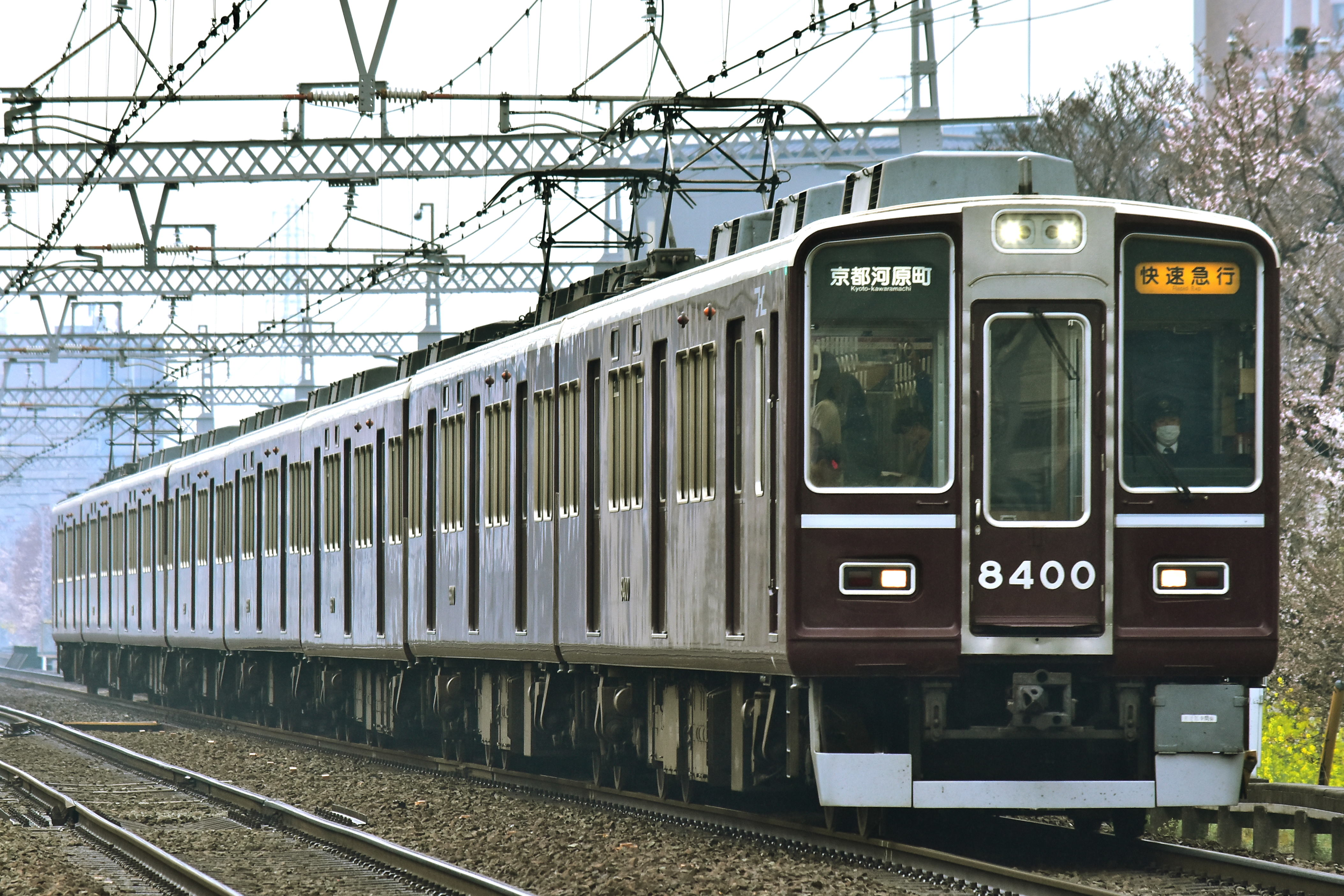
Set 8300 "classic 8300" livery, March 2020

== Interior ==
Passenger accommodation consists of longitudinal bench seating throughout.

== History ==
The trains first entered service in 1989.

To commemorate the 30th anniversary of the 8300 series' introduction into service, set 8300 returned to service on 24 May 2019 with external decorations reminiscent of the set in its as-built condition.

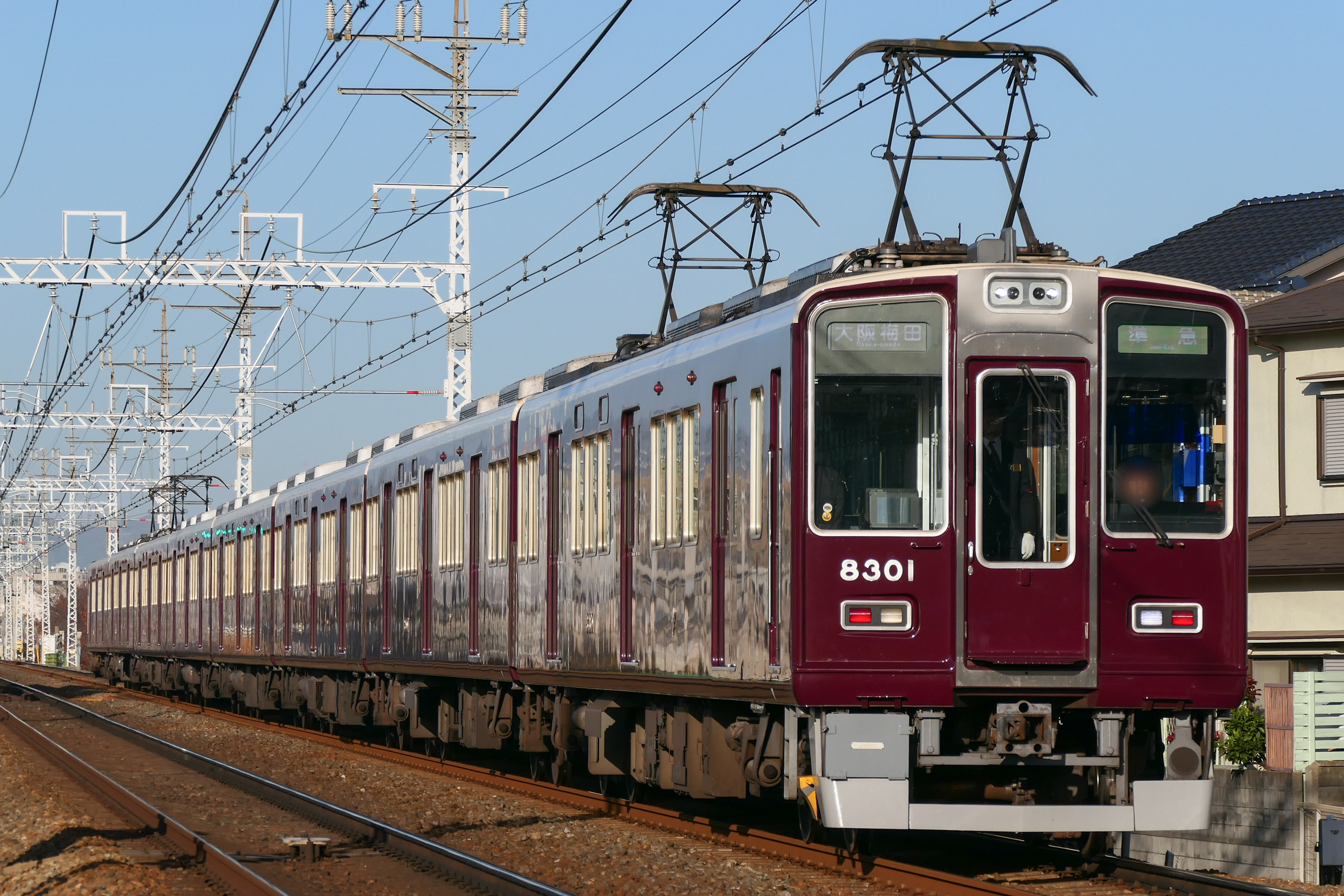
Refurbished set 8301 in December 2023

Beginning in 2023, the 8300 series has undergone a refurbishment programme, following a similar specification to treated 8000 series sets. The first set to be treated, 8300, returned to service in early 2023. Set 8301 returned to service in July of that year, with its leading car at the Osaka-umeda end (car 8301) having had its electrical coupler removed.

As of 15 April 2026, 2+6 car sets 8312 and 8331 have since been reorganized as two four-car sets for use on the Arashiyama Line.
