= List of railway stations in Japan: T =

List of railway stations in Japan

A	B	C	D	E	F	G	H	I	J	KL	M	N	O	P	R	S	T	U	W	Y	Z

This list shows the railway stations in Japan that begin with the letter T. This is a subset of the full list of railway stations in Japan.

== Station list ==
=== Ta ===
Tabaruzaka Station	田原坂駅（たばるざか）
Tabata Station (Nagano)	田畑駅（たばた）
Tabata Station (Tokyo)	田端駅（たばた）
Tabira-Hiradoguchi Station	たびら平戸口駅（たびらひらどぐち）
Tabuse Station	田布施駅（たぶせ）
Tabushi Station	旅伏駅（たぶし）
Tachiaigawa Station	立会川駅（たちあいがわ）
Tachiarai Station	太刀洗駅（たちあらい）
Tachibana Station	立花駅（たちばな）
Tachihi Station	立飛駅（たちひ）
Tachikawa Station	立川駅（たちかわ）
Tachikawa-Kita Station	立川北駅（たちかわきた）
Tachikawa-Minami Station	立川南駅（たちかわみなみ）
Tachiki Station	立木駅（たちき）
Tachikōji Station	立小路駅（たちこうじ）
Tachima Station	立間駅（たちま）
Tachita Station	館田駅（たちた）
Tada Station (Hyogo)	多田駅 (兵庫県)（ただ）
Tada Station (Tochigi)	多田駅 (栃木県)（ただ）
Tadachi Station	田立駅（ただち）
Tadami Station	只見駅（ただみ）
Tadanoumi Station	忠海駅（ただのうみ）
Tadaoka Station	忠岡駅（ただおか）
Tado Station	多度駅（たど）
Tadotsu Station	多度津駅（たどつ）
Tagajō Station	多賀城駅（たがじょう）
Tagami Station (Gifu)	田神駅（たがみ）
Tagami Station (Niigata)	田上駅（たがみ）
Tagataishamae Station	多賀大社前駅（たがたいしゃまえ）
Tagatajinjamae Station	田県神社前駅（たがたじんじゃまえ）
Tagawa-Gotōji Station	田川後藤寺駅（たがわごとうじ）
Tagawa-Ita Station	田川伊田駅（たがわいた）
Tagawa Municipal Hospital Station	田川市立病院駅（たがわしりつびょういん）
Tagi Station	田儀駅（たぎ）
Tagiri Station	田切駅（たぎり）
Tagokura Station	田子倉駅（たごくら）
Tahara Station	田原駅（たはら）
Tahōtō Station	多宝塔駅（たほうとう）
Taichō no Sato Station	泰澄の里駅（たいちょうのさと）
Taihei Station	太平駅（たいへい）
Taiji Station	太地駅（たいじ）
Taikenkōdō Station	体験坑道駅（たいけんこうどう）
Taimadera Station	当麻寺駅（たいまでら）
Tainohama Station	田井ノ浜駅（たいのはま）
Tainose Station	田井ノ瀬駅（たいのせ）
Tairadate Station	平館駅（たいらだて）
Tairamachi Station	多比良町駅（たいらまち）
Taisanji Station	大山寺駅 (愛知県)（たいさんじ）
Taisei Station	大成駅（たいせい）
Taishibashi-Imaichi Station	太子橋今市駅（たいしばしいまいち）
Taishidō Station	太子堂駅（たいしどう）
Taishō Station (Nagasaki)	大正駅 (長崎県)（たいしょう）
Taishō Station (Osaka)	大正駅 (大阪府)（たいしょう）
Taitō Station	太東駅（たいとう）
Taiyō Station	大洋駅（たいよう）
Tajibe Station	丹治部駅（たじべ）
Tajima Station (Nara)	但馬駅（たじま）
Tajima Station (Tochigi)	田島駅（たじま）
Tajimakōkōmae Station	田島高校前駅（たじまこうこうまえ）
Tajimi Station	多治見駅（たじみ）
Tajiri Station	田尻駅（たじり）
Taka Station	高駅（たか）
Takabata Station	高畑駅（たかばた）
Takachaya Station	高茶屋駅（たかちゃや）
Takada Station (Nara)	高田駅 (奈良県)（たかだ）
Takada Station (Niigata)	高田駅 (新潟県)（たかだ）
Takadabashi Station	高田橋駅（たかだばし）
Takadahonzan Station	高田本山駅（たかだほんざん）
Takadanobaba Station	高田馬場駅（たかだのばば）
Takadano-tekkyō Station	高田の鉄橋駅（たかだのてっきょう）
Takadashi Station	高田市駅（たかだし）
Takagari Station	鷹狩駅（たかがり）
Takagi Station (Hiroshima)	高木駅 (広島県)（たかぎ）
Takagi Station (Toyama)	高儀駅（たかぎ）
Takagimachi Station	高城町駅（たかぎまち）
Takahagi Station	高萩駅（たかはぎ）
Takahama Station (Ehime)	高浜駅 (愛媛県)（たかはま）
Takahama Station (Ibaraki)	高浜駅 (茨城県)（たかはま）
Takahama Station (Shimane)	高浜駅 (島根県)（たかはま）
Takahamaminato Station	高浜港駅（たかはまみなと）
Takaharu Station	高原駅（たかはる）
Takahashi Station	高橋駅（たかはし）
Takahata Station	高畠駅（たかはた）
Takahata-Fudō Station	高幡不動駅（たかはたふどう）
Takaida Station (Higashiosaka, Osaka)	高井田駅 (大阪府東大阪市)（たかいだ）
Takaida Station (Kashiwara, Osaka)	高井田駅 (大阪府柏原市)（たかいだ）
Takaida-Chūō Station	高井田中央駅（たかいだちゅうおう）
Takaido Station	高井戸駅（たかいど）
Takaishi Station	高石駅（たかいし）
Takaiwa Station (Nagano)	高岩駅 (長野県)（たかいわ）
Takaiwa Station (Nagasaki)	高岩駅 (長崎県)（たかいわ）
Takajō Station	高城駅（たかじょう）
Takako Station	高子駅（たかこ）
Takaku Station	高久駅（たかく）
Takamatsu Station (Ishikawa)	高松駅 (石川県)（たかまつ）
Takamatsu Station (Kagawa)	高松駅 (香川県)（たかまつ）
Takamatsu Station (Tokyo)	高松駅 (東京都)（たかまつ）
Takamatsu-Chikkō Station	高松築港駅（たかまつちっこう）
Takamatsuchō Station	高松町駅（たかまつちょう）
Takamatsu Freight Terminal Station	高松貨物ターミナル駅（たかまつかもつたーみなる）
Takaminosato Station	高見ノ里駅（たかみのさと）
Takamitsu Station	高光駅（たかみつ）
Takamiya Station (Fukuoka)	高宮駅 (福岡県)（たかみや）
Takamiya Station (Shiga)	高宮駅 (滋賀県)（たかみや）
Takamizu Station	高水駅（たかみず）
Takamori Station	高森駅（たかもり）
Takanabe Station	高鍋駅（たかなべ）
Takanawadai Station	高輪台駅（たかなわだい）
Takanawa Gateway Station	高輪ゲートウェイ駅（たかなわげーとぅえい）
Takanekido Station	高根木戸駅（たかねきど）
Takanekōdan Station	高根公団駅（たかねこうだん）
Takano Station	高野駅 (岡山県)（たかの）
Takanodai Station	鷹の台駅（たかのだい）
Takanohara Station	高の原駅（たかのはら）
Takanoko Station	鷹ノ子駅（たかのこ）
Takanomiya Station	高ノ宮駅（たかのみや）
Takanosu Station	鷹巣駅（たかのす）
Takao Station (Gifu)	高尾駅 (岐阜県)（たかお）
Takao Station (Tokyo)	高尾駅 (東京都)（たかお）
Takaoka Station (Aichi)	高岳駅（たかおか）
Takaoka Station (Manyosen)	高岡駅停留場（たかおかえき）
Takaoka Station (Toyama)	高岡駅（たかおか）
Takaoka-Yabunami Station	高岡やぶなみ駅（たかおかやぶなみ）
Takaono Station	高尾野駅（たかおの）
Takaosan Station	高尾山駅（たかおさん）
Takaosanguchi Station	高尾山口駅（たかおさんぐち）
Takarabe Station	財部駅（たからべ）
Takarachō Station	宝町駅（たからちょう）
Takaragaike Station	宝ヶ池駅（たからがいけ）
Takarazuka Station (JR West)	宝塚駅（たからづか）
Takarazuka Station (Hankyu)	宝塚駅（たからづか）
Takarazuka-Minamiguchi Station	宝塚南口駅（たからづかみなみぐち）
Takasago Station (Hokkaidō)	高砂駅 (北海道)（たかさご）
Takasago Station (Hyogo)	高砂駅 (兵庫県)（たかさご）
Takasagochō Station	高砂町駅（たかさごちょう）
Takasaka Station	高坂駅（たかさか）
Takasaki Station	高崎駅（たかさき）
Takasaki-Shinden Station	高崎新田駅（たかさきしんでん）
Takasaki-Shōka-Daigakumae Station	高崎商科大学前駅（たかさきしょうかだいがくまえ）
Takasaki-Tonyamachi Station	高崎問屋町駅（たかさきとんやまち）
Takase Station (Kagawa)	高瀬駅 (香川県)（たかせ）
Takase Station (Yamagata)	高瀬駅 (山形県)（たかせ）
Takashi Station	高師駅（たかし）
Takashima Station	高島駅（たかしま）
Takashimachō Station	高島町駅（たかしまちょう）
Takashimadaira Station	高島平駅（たかしまだいら）
Takashimaguchi Station	鷹島口駅（たかしまぐち）
Takashina Station	高科駅（たかしな）
Takashinohama Station	高師浜駅（たかしのはま）
Takasu Station (Hiroshima)	高須駅（たかす）
Takasu Station (Kōchi)	高須停留場（たかす）
Takasujinja Station	高須神社駅（たかすじんじゃ）
Takata Station (Fukuoka)	高田駅 (福岡県)（たかた）
Takata Station (Kagawa)	高田駅 (香川県)（たかた）
Takata Station (Kanagawa)	高田駅 (神奈川県)（たかた）
Takataki Station	高滝駅（たかたき）
Takatama Station	高擶駅（たかたま）
Takatōbara Station	高遠原駅（たかとおばら）
Takatori Station (Hiroshima)	高取駅（たかとり）
Takatori Station (Hyogo)	鷹取駅（たかとり）
Takatsu Station (Kanagawa)	高津駅 (神奈川県)（たかつ）
Takatsu Station (Kyoto)	高津駅 (京都府)（たかつ）
Takatsuka Station	高塚駅（たかつか）
Takatsuki Station (Shiga)	高月駅（たかつき）
Takatsuki Station (Osaka)	高槻駅（たかつき）
Takatsuki-shi Station	高槻市駅（たかつきし）
Takatsuno Station	高角駅（たかつの）
Takawashi Station	高鷲駅（たかわし）
Takaya Station	高屋駅（たかや）
Takayama Station	高山駅（たかやま）
Takayanagi Station	高柳駅（たかやなぎ）
Takayasu Station	高安駅（たかやす）
Takayasuyama Station	高安山駅 （たかやすやま）
Takayokosuka Station	高横須賀駅（たかよこすか）
Take Station	竹駅（たけ）
Takebashi Station	竹橋駅（たけばし）
Takebe Station	建部駅（たけべ）
Takeda Station (Hyogo)	竹田駅 (兵庫県)（たけだ）
Takeda Station (Kyoto)	竹田駅 (京都府)（たけだ）
Takedao Station	武田尾駅（たけだお）
Takefu Station	武生駅（たけふ）
Takefu-shin Station	たけふ新駅（たけふしん）
Takehana Station	竹鼻駅（たけはな）
Takehara Station	竹原駅（たけはら）
Takekawa Station	武川駅（たけかわ）
Takekoma Station	竹駒駅（たけこま）
Takematsu Station	竹松駅（たけまつ）
Takemura Station	竹村駅（たけむら）
Takenaka Station	竹中駅（たけなか）
Takenami Station	武並駅（たけなみ）
Takeno Station	竹野駅（たけの）
Takenotsuka Station	竹ノ塚駅（たけのつか）
Takeoka Station	竹岡駅（たけおか）
Takeo-Onsen Station	武雄温泉駅（たけおおんせん）
Takesato Station	武里駅（たけさと）
Takeshi Station	武志駅（たけし）
Takeshiba Station	竹芝駅（たけしば）
Takeshita Station	竹下駅（たけした）
Taketoyo Station	武豊駅（たけとよ）
Takeura Station	竹浦駅（たけうら）
Takezawa Station	竹沢駅（たけざわ）
Taki Station (Mie)	多気駅（たき）
Taki Station (Hyogo)	滝駅 (兵庫県)（たき）
Taki Station (Tochigi)	滝駅 (栃木県)（たき）
Takibe Station	滝部駅（たきべ）
Takidani Station	滝谷駅 (大阪府)（たきだに）
Takidani-Fudō Station	滝谷不動駅（たきだにふどう）
Takifudō Station	滝不動駅 （たきふどう）
Takihama Station	多喜浜駅（たきはま）
Takihara Station	滝原駅（たきはら）
Takii Station	滝井駅（たきい）
Takikawa Station	滝川駅（たきかわ）
Takimizu Station	滝水駅（たきみず）
Takimoto Station	滝本駅（たきもと）
Takino Station	滝野駅（たきの）
Takinochaya Station	滝の茶屋駅（たきのちゃや）
Takinogawa-itchōme Station	滝野川一丁目停留場（たきのがわいっちょうめ）
Takinoma Station	滝ノ間駅（たきのま）
Takinomiya Station	滝宮駅（たきのみや）
Takinoue Station	滝ノ上駅（たきのうえ）
Takio Station	滝尾駅（たきお）
Takiya Station	滝谷駅 (福島県)（たきや）
Takiyama Station	滝山駅（たきやま）
Takizawa Station	滝沢駅（たきざわ）
Tako Station	田子駅（たこ）
Takojizō Station	蛸地蔵駅（たこじぞう）
Taku Station	多久駅（たく）
Takuhoku Station	拓北駅（たくほく）
Takuma Station	詫間駅（たくま）
Takyō Station	田京駅（たきょう）
Tama Center Station	多摩センター駅（たませんたー）
Tama Plaza Station	たまプラーザ駅（たまぷらーざ）
Tama Station	多磨駅（たま）
Tamachi Station (Okayama)	田町停留場（たまち）
Tamachi Station (Tokyo)	田町駅（たまち）
Tamade Station (Nara)	玉手駅（たまで）
Tamade Station (Osaka)	玉出駅（たまで）
Tamado Station	玉戸駅（たまど）
Tama-Dōbutsukōen Station	多摩動物公園駅（たまどうぶつこうえん）
Tamae Station	玉江駅（たまえ）
Tamagaki Station	玉垣駅（たまがき）
Tamagashi Station	玉柏駅（たまがし）
Tamagawa Station (Iwate)	玉川駅 (岩手県)（たまがわ）
Tamagawa Station (Osaka)	玉川駅 (大阪府)（たまがわ）
Tamagawa Station (Tokyo)	多摩川駅（たまがわ）
Tamagawagakuen-mae Station	玉川学園前駅（たまがわがくえんまえ）
Tamagawajōsui Station	玉川上水駅（たまがわじょうすい）
Tamagawamura Station	玉川村駅（たまがわむら）
Tamako Station	多摩湖駅（たまこ）
Tamamizu Station	玉水駅（たまみず）
Tamamura Station	玉村駅（たまむら）
Tamana Station	玉名駅（たまな）
Tamano Station	玉野駅（たまの）
Tamanoe Station	玉之江駅（たまのえ）
Tamanoi Station	玉ノ井駅（たまのい）
Tamarai Station	玉来駅（たまらい）
Tama-Reien Station	多磨霊園駅（たまれいえん）
Tamari Station	玉里駅（たまり）
Tamaru Station	田丸駅（たまる）
Tamasakai Station	多摩境駅（たまさかい）
Tamatsukuri Station	玉造駅（たまつくり）
Tamatsukurimachi Station	玉造町駅（たまつくりまち）
Tamatsukuri-Onsen Station	玉造温泉駅（たまつくりおんせん）
Tamayodo Station	玉淀駅（たまよど）
Tambabashi Station	丹波橋駅（たんばばし）
Tambaguchi Station	丹波口駅（たんばぐち）
Tamba-Ōyama Station	丹波大山駅（たんばおおやま）
Tamba-Takeda Station	丹波竹田駅（たんばたけだ）
Tameike-Sannō Station	溜池山王駅（ためいけさんのう）
Tammachi Station	反町駅（たんまち）
Tamoto Station	田本駅（たもと）
Tampi Station	丹比駅（たんぴ）
Tamura Station	田村駅（たむら）
Tana Station	田奈駅（たな）
Tanabe Station	田辺駅（たなべ）
Tanagata Station	棚方駅（たながた）
Tanagawa Station	多奈川駅（たながわ）
Tanaka Station	田中駅（たなか）
Tanakaguchi Station	田中口駅（たなかぐち）
Tanakura Station	棚倉駅（たなくら）
Tanami Station	田並駅（たなみ）
Tanashi Station	田無駅（たなし）
Taneichi Station	種市駅（たねいち）
Tanesashi-kaigan Station	種差海岸駅（たねさしかいがん）
Tanga Station	旦過駅（たんが）
Tango-Kanzaki Station	丹後神崎駅（たんごかんざき）
Tango-Yura Station	丹後由良駅（たんごゆら）
Tanigami Station	谷上駅（たにがみ）
Tanigashira Station	谷頭駅（たにがしら）
Tanigumiguchi Station	谷汲口駅（たにぐみぐち）
Tanihama Station	谷浜駅（たにはま）
Tanikawa Station	谷川駅（たにかわ）
Tanimachi Kyūchōme Station	谷町九丁目駅（たにまちきゅうちょうめ）
Tanimachi Rokuchōme Station	谷町六丁目駅（たにまちろくちょうめ）
Tanimachi Yonchōme Station	谷町四丁目駅（たにまちよんちょうめ）
Taninokuchi Station	谷之口駅（たにのくち）
Taniyama Station (JR Kyushu)	谷山駅 (鹿児島県)（たにやま）
Taniyama Station (Kagoshima Municipal Tramway)	谷山停留場（たにやま）
Tanjōji Station	誕生寺駅（たんじょうじ）
Tanno Station	端野駅（たんの）
Tannowa Station	淡輪駅（たんのわ）
Tano Station (Kōchi)	田野駅 (高知県)（たの）
Tano Station (Miyazaki)	田野駅 (宮崎県)（たの）
Tanohata Station	田野畑駅（たのはた）
Tanokubo Station	田窪駅（たのくぼ）
Tanokuchi Station	田野口駅（たのくち）
Tanokura Station	田野倉駅（たのくら）
Tanoura-Otachimisaki-kōen Station	たのうら御立岬公園駅（たのうらおたちみさきこうえん）
Tanshō Station	丹荘駅（たんしょう）
Tanuma Station	田沼駅（たぬま）
Tanushimaru Station	田主丸駅（たぬしまる）
Taoji Station	田尾寺駅（たおじ）
Tappi-Kaitei Station	竜飛海底駅（たっぴかいてい）
Tara Station	多良駅（たら）
Taragi Station	多良木駅（たらぎ）
Taragi-Shōrenji Station	多良木青蓮寺駅（たらぎしょうれんじ）
Tarō Station	田老駅（たろう）
Tarōbōgū-mae Station	太郎坊宮前駅（たろうぼうぐうまえ）
Taromaru Angelland Station	太郎丸エンゼルランド駅（たろうまるえんぜるらんど）
Tarui Station (Gifu)	垂井駅（たるい）
Tarui Station (Osaka)	樽井駅（たるい）
Tarumi Station (Gifu)	樽見駅（たるみ）
Tarumi Station (Hyogo)	垂水駅（たるみ）
Tashiro Station	田代駅（たしろ）
Tatara Station (Gunma)	多々良駅（たたら）
Tatara Station (Tochigi)	多田羅駅（たたら）
Tateba Station	立場駅（たてば）
Tatebayashi Station	館林駅（たてばやし）
Tatebori Station	竪堀駅（たてぼり）
Tateda Station	立田駅（たてだ）
Tategahana Station	立ヶ花駅（たてがはな）
Tateishi Station	立石駅（たていし）
Tatekawame Station	立川目駅（たてかわめ）
Tatekoshi Station	館腰駅（たてこし）
Tatemachi Station	立町駅（たてまち）
Tateno Station (Kumamoto)	立野駅 (熊本県)（たての）
Tateno Station (Saga)	立野駅 (佐賀県)（たての）
Tateyama Station (Chiba)	館山駅（たてやま）
Tateyama Station (Toyama)	立山駅（たてやま）
Tateyama Station (Yamagata)	楯山駅（たてやま）
Tatsue Station	立江駅（たつえ）
Tatsumi Station	辰巳駅（たつみ）
Tatsumichi Station	立道駅（たつみち）
Tatsumigaoka Station	巽ヶ丘駅（たつみがおか）
Tatsuno Station (Nagano)	辰野駅（たつの）
Tatsuno Station (Hyōgo)	竜野駅（たつの）
Tatsuokajō Station	龍岡城駅（たつおかじょう）
Tatsuruhama Station	田鶴浜駅（たつるはま）
Tatsuta Station	竜田駅（たつた）
Tatsutagawa Station	竜田川駅（たつたがわ）
Tatsutaguchi Station	竜田口駅（たつたぐち）
Taura Station	田浦駅（たうら）
Tawarada Station	俵田駅（たわらだ）
Tawaramachi Station (Fukui)	田原町駅 (福井県)（たわらまち）
Tawaramachi Station (Tokyo)	田原町駅 (東京都)（たわらまち）
Tawaramoto Station	田原本駅（たわらもと）
Taya Station	多屋駅（たや）
Tayama Station	田山駅（たやま）
Tayoro Station	多寄駅（たよろ）
Tayoshi Station	田吉駅（たよし）
Tazawa Station	田沢駅（たざわ）
Tazawako Station	田沢湖駅（たざわこ）
Tazoe Station	田添駅（たぞえ）
Tazu Station	田津駅（たづ）

=== Te ===
Tedako-Uranishi Station	てだこ浦西駅（てだこうらにし）
Tegara Station	手柄駅（てがら）
Tegarayamaheiwakōen Station	手柄山平和公園駅（てがらやまへいわこうえん）
Tehara Station	手原駅（てはら）
Teine Station	手稲駅（ていね）
Tejikara Station	手力駅（てぢから）
Tekuno-Sakaki Station	テクノさかき駅（てくのさかき）
Telecom Center Station	テレコムセンター駅
Temma Station	天満駅（てんま）
Temmabashi Station	天満橋駅（てんまばし）
Temmachō Station	伝馬町駅（てんまちょう）
Tempaizan Station	天拝山駅（てんぱいざん）
Tendai Station	天台駅（てんだい）
Tendō Station	天童駅（てんどう）
Tendō-Minami Station	天童南駅（てんどうみなみ）
Tengachaya Station	天下茶屋駅（てんがちゃや）
Tenjin Station	天神駅（てんじん）
Nishitetsu Fukuoka (Tenjin) Station	西鉄福岡（天神）駅（にしてつふくおか（てんじん））
Tenjimbashisuji Rokuchōme Station	天神橋筋六丁目駅（てんじんばしすじろくちょうめ）
Tenjingawa Station	天神川駅（てんじんがわ）
Tenjin-minami Station	天神南駅（てんじんみなみ）
Tenjin-yama Station	天神山駅（てんじんやま）
Tenkūbashi Station	天空橋駅（てんくうばし）
Tenma-cho Station	天満町駅（てんまちょう）
Tennō Station (Akita)	天王駅（てんのう）
Tennō Station (Hiroshima)	天応駅（てんのう）
Tennōchō Station	天王町駅（てんのうちょう）
Tennōdai Station	天王台駅（てんのうだい）
Tennōji Station	天王寺駅（てんのうじ）
Tennōji-eki-mae Station	天王寺駅前駅（てんのうじえきまえ）
Tennōjuku Station	天王宿駅（てんのうじゅく）
Tennōzu Isle Station	天王洲アイル駅（てんのうずアイル）
Tenoko Station	手ノ子駅（てのこ）
Tenri Station	天理駅（てんり）
Tenryū-Futamata Station	天竜二俣駅（てんりゅうふたまた）
Tenryūgawa Station	天竜川駅（てんりゅうがわ）
Tenryūkyō Station	天竜峡駅（てんりゅうきょう）
Tentō Station	天道駅（てんとう）
Tenwa Station	天和駅（てんわ）
Ten-yaba Station	天矢場駅（てんやば）
Teppōchō Station	鉄砲町駅（てっぽうちょう）
Terada Station (Kyoto)	寺田駅 (京都府)（てらだ）
Terada Station (Toyama)	寺田駅 (富山県)（てらだ）
Teradachō Station	寺田町駅（てらだちょう）
Terajichō Station	寺地町駅（てらぢちょう）
Teradomari Station	寺泊駅（てらどまり）
Terahara Station	寺原駅（てらはら）
Teramae Station	寺前駅（てらまえ）
Teramoto Station	寺本駅（てらもと）
Terao Station	寺尾駅（てらお）
Terashita Station	寺下駅（てらした）
Terashō Station	寺庄駅（てらしょう）
Terauchi Station	寺内駅（てらうち）
Teruoka Station	光岡駅（てるおか）
Teshiogawa-Onsen Station	天塩川温泉駅（てしおがわおんせん）
Teshio-Nakagawa Station	天塩中川駅（てしおなかがわ）
Tetaru Station	手樽駅（てたる）
Tetsudō-Hakubutsukan Station	鉄道博物館駅（てつどうはくぶつかん）
Tezukayama Station	帝塚山駅（てづかやま）

=== To ===
Toasa Station	遠浅駅（とあさ）
Toba Station	鳥羽駅（とば）
Tobakaidō Station	鳥羽街道駅（とばかいどう）
Tobanaka Station	鳥羽中駅（とばなか）
Tobanoe Station	騰波ノ江駅（とばのえ）
Tobata Station	戸畑駅（とばた）
Tobe Station	戸部駅（とべ）
Tōbetsu Station	当別駅（とうべつ）
Tobitakyū Station	飛田給駅（とびたきゅう）
Tobiyama Castle Site Station	飛山城跡停留場（とびやまじょうあと）
Tōbu Dōbutsu Kōen Station	東武動物公園駅（とうぶどうぶつこうえんまえ）
Tōbu Izumi Station	東武和泉駅（とうぶいずみ）
Tōbu Kanasaki Station	東武金崎駅（とうぶかなさき）
Tōbu Nerima Station	東武練馬駅（とうぶねりま）
Tōbu Nikkō Station	東武日光駅（とうぶにっこう）
Tōbushijō-mae Station	東部市場前駅（とうぶしじょうまえ）
Tōbu Takezawa Station	東武竹沢駅（とうぶたけざわ）
Tōbu Utsunomiya Station	東武宇都宮駅（とうぶうつのみや）
Tobu World Square Station	東武ワールドスクウェア駅（とうぶわーるどすくうぇあ）
Tochigi Station	栃木駅（とちぎ）
Tochihara Station	栃原駅（とちはら）
Tochiya Station	栃屋駅（とちや）
Tochōmae Station	都庁前駅（とちょうまえ）
Toda Station (Aichi)	戸田駅 (愛知県)（とだ）
Toda Station (Saitama)	戸田駅 (埼玉県)（とだ）
Tōdaimae Station	東大前駅（とうだいまえ）
Todakohama Station	戸田小浜駅（とだこはま）
Todakōen Station	戸田公園駅（とだこうえん）
Tode Station	戸手駅（とで）
Toden-Zōshigaya Station	都電雑司ヶ谷駅（とでんぞうしがや）
Tōdera Station	塔寺駅（とうでら）
Todoroki Station (Aomori)	驫木駅（とどろき）
Todoroki Station (Tokyo)	等々力駅（とどろき）
Tōei Station	東栄駅（とうえい）
Tōfukuji Station	東福寺駅（とうふくじ）
Tofurō-mae Station	都府楼前駅（とふろうまえ）
Tofurō-minami Station	都府楼南駅（とふろうみなみ）
Tōfutsu Station	十弗駅（とおふつ）
Toga-Mikita Station	栂・美木多駅（とが・みきた）
Tōgane Station	東金駅（とうがね）
Togano Station	斗賀野駅（とがの）
Togari-Nozawa-onsen Station	戸狩野沢温泉駅（とがりのざわおんせん）
Togashira Station	戸頭駅（とがしら）
Togawa Station	十川駅 (青森県)（とがわ）
Tōge Station	峠駅（とうげ）
Tōgendai Station	桃源台駅（とうげんだい）
Tōgeshita Station	峠下駅（とうげした）
Tōgō Station	東郷駅（とうごう）
Togoshi Station	戸越駅（とごし）
Togoshi-Ginza Station	戸越銀座駅（とごしぎんざ）
Togoshi-kōen Station	戸越公園駅（とごしこうえん）
Togura Station	戸倉駅（とぐら）
Tōhoku Fukushi-dai-mae Station	東北福祉大前駅（とうほくふくしだいまえ）
Tohori Station	砥堀駅（とほり）
Toide Station	戸出駅（といで）
Toikambetsu Station	問寒別駅（といかんべつ）
Tōin Station	東員駅（とういん）
Tōji Station	東寺駅（とうじ）
Tōjiin Ritsumeikan University Station	等持院・立命館大学衣笠キャンパス前駅（とうじいん・りつめいかんだいがくきぬがさきゃんぱすまえ）
Tōjimmachi Station	唐人町駅（とうじんまち）
Tōji-shiryōkan-minami Station	陶磁資料館南駅（とうじしりょうかんみなみ）
Tōjō Station (Aichi)	東上駅（とうじょう）
Tōjō Station (Hiroshima)	東城駅（とうじょう）
Tokachi-Shimizu Station	十勝清水駅（とかちしみず）
Tōkai Station	東海駅（とうかい）
Tōkaichiba Station (Kanagawa)	十日市場駅 (神奈川県)（とおかいちば）
Tōkaichiba Station (Yamanashi)	十日市場駅 (山梨県)（とおかいちば）
Tōkaichi-machi Station	十日市町駅（とおかいちまち）
Tōkai-daigaku-mae Station	東海大学前駅（とうかいだいがくまえ）
Tōkaidōri Station	東海通駅（とうかいどおり）
Tōkaigakuenmae Station	東海学園前駅（とうかいがくえんまえ）
Tōkamachi Station	十日町駅（とおかまち）
Tokawa Station	外川駅（とかわ）
Tōkawa Station	十川駅 (高知県)（とおかわ）
Toke Station	土気駅（とけ）
Tokida Station	外城田駅（ときだ）
Tokimata Station	時又駅（ときまた）
Tokiniwa Station	時庭駅（ときにわ）
Tokishi Station	土岐市駅（ときし）
Tokiwa Station (Kyoto)	常盤駅 (京都府)（ときわ）
Tokiwa Station (Okayama)	常盤駅 (岡山県)（ときわ）
Tokiwa Station (Yamaguchi)	常盤駅 (山口県)（ときわ）
Tokiwadai Station (Osaka)	ときわ台駅 (大阪府)（ときわだい）
Tokiwadai Station (Tokyo)	ときわ台駅 (東京都)（ときわだい）
Tokiwadaira Station	常盤平駅（ときわだいら）
Tōkōji Station	東光寺駅（とうこうじ）
Tokoname Station	常滑駅（とこなめ）
Tokonami Station	床波駅（とこなみ）
Tokorogi Station	所木駅（ところぎ）
Tokorozawa Station	所沢駅（ところざわ）
Tokuan Station	徳庵駅（とくあん）
Tokuda Station (Ishikawa)	徳田駅 (石川県)（とくだ）
Tokuda Station (Mie)	徳田駅 (三重県)（とくだ）
Tokumaru Station	徳丸駅（とくまる）
Tokumasu Station	徳益駅（とくます）
Tokumitsu Station	徳満駅（とくみつ）
Tokunaga Station	徳永駅（とくなが）
Tokuriki-Arashiyamaguchi Station	徳力嵐山口駅（とくりきあらしやまぐち）
Tokuriki-Kōdan-mae Station	徳力公団前駅（とくりきこうだんまえ）
Tokusa Station	徳佐駅（とくさ）
Tokusawa Station	徳沢駅（とくさわ）
Tokushige Station	徳重駅 (名古屋市)（とくしげ）
Tokushige-Nagoyageidai Station	徳重・名古屋芸大駅（とくしげ・なごやげいだい）
Tokushima Station	徳島駅（とくしま）
Tokushuku Station	徳宿駅（とくしゅく）
Tokuwa Station	徳和駅（とくわ）
Tokuyama Station	徳山駅（とくやま）
Tokyo Station	東京駅（とうきょう）
Tokyo Big Sight Station	東京ビッグサイト駅（とうきょうビッグサイト）
Tokyo Disney Sea Station	東京ディズニーシー・ステーション駅（とうきょうディズニーシーステーション）
Tokyo Disneyland Station	東京ディズニーランド・ステーション駅（とうきょうディズニーランドステーション）
Tokyo International Cruise Terminal Station	東京国際クルーズターミナル駅（とうきょうこくさいクルーズターミナル）
Tokyo Skytree Station	とうきょうスカイツリー駅（とうきょうスカイツリー）
Tokyo Teleport Station	東京テレポート駅（とうきょうテレポート）
Tōma Station	当麻駅（とうま）
Tomabechi Station	苫米地駅（とまべち）
Tomai Station	斗米駅（とまい）
Tomakomai Station	苫小牧駅（とまこまい）
Tomamu Station	トマム駅
Tomari Station (Mie)	泊駅 (三重県)（とまり）
Tomari Station (Toyama)	泊駅 (富山県)（とまり）
Tomari Station (Tottori)	泊駅 (鳥取県)（とまり）
Tomiai Station	富合駅（とみあい）
Tomida Station	富田駅 (三重県)（とみだ）
Tomidahama Station	富田浜駅（とみだはま）
Tomihara Station	富原駅（とみはら）
Tomika Station	富加駅（とみか）
Tomikawa Station	富川駅（とみかわ）
Tomine Station	富根駅（とみね）
Tomino Station	富野駅（とみの）
Tomio Station	富雄駅（とみお）
Tomioka Station	富岡駅（とみおか）
Tomiokamae Station	富岡前駅（とみおかまえ）
Tomisato Station	十三里駅（とみさと）
Tomita Station	富田駅 (栃木県)（とみた）
Tomiura Station (Chiba)	富浦駅 (千葉県)（とみうら）
Tomiura Station (Hokkaidō)	富浦駅 (北海道)（とみうら）
Tomiyoshi Station	富吉駅（とみよし）
Tomizawa Station	富沢駅（とみざわ）
Tomizu Station	富水駅（とみず）
Tomo Station	伴駅（とも）
Tomobe Station	友部駅（ともべ）
Tomo-chūō Station	伴中央駅（ともちゅうおう）
Tomoe Station	友江駅（ともえ）
Tomoegawa Station	巴川駅（ともえがわ）
Tomura Station	十村駅（とむら）
Tōna Station	東名駅（とうな）
Tonami Station	砺波駅（となみ）
Tonda Station	富田駅 (大阪府)（とんだ）
Tondabayashi Station	富田林駅（とんだばやし）
Tondabayashi-nishiguchi Station	富田林西口駅（とんだばやしにしぐち）
Toneri Station	舎人駅（とねり）
Toneri-kōen Station	舎人公園駅（とねりこうえん）
Tōni Station	唐丹駅（とうに）
Tōno Station	遠野駅（とおの）
Tōnohama Station	唐浜駅（とうのはま）
Tōnoharu Station	唐の原駅（とうのはる）
Tōnohetsuri Station	塔のへつり駅（とうのへつり）
Tonoki Station	富木駅（とのき）
Tonomi Station	富海駅（とのみ）
Tōnosawa Station	塔ノ沢駅（とうのさわ）
Tonoshō Station	富野荘駅（とのしょう）
Tonoyama Station	殿山駅（とのやま）
Tōrichōsuji Station	通町筋駅（とおりちょうすじ）
Tōritani Station	通谷駅（とおりたに）
Torahime Station	虎姫駅（とらひめ）
Torami Station	東浪見駅（とらみ）
Toranomon Station	虎ノ門駅（とらのもん）
Toranomon Hills Station	虎ノ門ヒルズ駅（とらのもんひるず）
Toride Station	取手駅（とりで）
Torigata Station	鳥形駅（とりがた）
Torihama Station	鳥浜駅（とりはま）
Torii Station (Aichi)	鳥居駅（とりい）
Toriimae Station	鳥居前駅（とりいまえ）
Toriimoto Station	鳥居本駅（とりいもと）
Torinoki Station	鳥ノ木駅（とりのき）
Torisawa Station	鳥沢駅（とりさわ）
Toritsudaigaku Station	都立大学駅（とりつだいがく）
Toritsu-Kasei Station	都立家政駅（とりつかせい）
Toro Station	土呂駅（とろ）
Tōro Station	塘路駅（とうろ）
Torokko Arashiyama Station	トロッコ嵐山駅（トロッコあらしやま）
Torokko Hozukyō Station	トロッコ保津峡駅（トロッコほづきょう）
Torokko Kameoka Station	トロッコ亀岡駅（トロッコかめおか）
Torokko Saga Station	トロッコ嵯峨駅（トロッコさが）
Tosa-Ananai Station	土佐穴内駅（とさあなない）
Tosa-Ikku Station	土佐一宮駅（とさいっく）
Tosa-Irino Station	土佐入野駅（とさいりの）
Tosa-Iwahara Station	土佐岩原駅（とさいわはら）
Tosa-Kamikawaguchi Station	土佐上川口駅（とさかみかわぐち）
Tosa-Kamo Station	土佐加茂駅（とさかも）
Tosa-Kitagawa Station	土佐北川駅（とさきたがわ）
Tosa-Kure Station	土佐久礼駅（とさくれ）
Tosa-Nagaoka Station	土佐長岡駅（とさながおか）
Tosa-Ōtsu Station	土佐大津駅（とさおおつ）
Tosa-Saga Station	土佐佐賀駅（とささが）
Tosa-Shinjō Station	土佐新荘駅（とさしんじょう）
Tosa-Shirahama Station	土佐白浜駅（とさしらはま）
Tosa-Shōwa Station	土佐昭和駅（とさしょうわ）
Tosa-Taishō Station	土佐大正駅（とさたいしょう）
Tosa-Yamada Station	土佐山田駅（とさやまだ）
Toshibetsu Station	利別駅（としべつ）
Toshima Station	豊島駅（としま）
Tōshima Station	十島駅（とおしま）
Toshimaen Station	豊島園駅（としまえん）
Tōshōgū Station	東照宮駅（とうしょうぐう）
Toso Station	唐湊駅（とそ）
Tosu Station	鳥栖駅（とす）
Tōtōmi-Ichinomiya Station	遠江一宮駅（とおとうみいちのみや）
Totoro Station	土々呂駅（ととろ）
Totsuka Station	戸塚駅（とつか）
Tottori Station	鳥取駅（とっとり）
Tottoridaigaku-mae Station	鳥取大学前駅（とっとりだいがくまえ）
Tottorinoshō Station	鳥取ノ荘駅（とっとりのしょう）
Tōun Station	東雲駅 (北海道)（とううん）
Towada-Minami Station	十和田南駅（とわだみなみ）
Towadashi Station	十和田市駅（とわだし）
Towata Station	戸綿駅（とわた）
Tōya Station (Kushiro, Hokkaidō)	遠矢駅（とおや）
Tōya Station (Tōyako, Hokkaidō)	洞爺駅（とうや）
Toyama Station	富山駅（とやま）
Toyamaekimae Station	富山駅前駅（とやまえきまえ）
Toyamaguchi Station	富山口駅（とやまぐち）
Toyasaki Station	鳥矢崎駅（とやさき）
Tōyō Katsutadai Station	東葉勝田台駅（とうようかつただい）
Toyoake Station	豊明駅（とよあけ）
Tōyōchō Station	東陽町駅（とうようちょう）
Toyoda Station	豊田駅（とよだ）
Toyodachō Station	豊田町駅（とよだちょう）
Toyodahommachi Station	豊田本町駅（とよだほんまち）
Toyogaoka Station	豊ヶ岡駅（とよがおか）
Toyohama Station	豊浜駅（とよはま）
Toyohara Station	豊原駅（とよはら）
Toyoharu Station	豊春駅（とよはる）
Toyohashi Station	豊橋駅（とよはし）
Toyohashikōemmae Station	豊橋公園前駅（とよはしこうえんまえ）
Toyohirakōen Station	豊平公園駅（とよひらこうえん）
Toyohoro Station	豊幌駅（とよほろ）
Toyokawa Station (Aichi)	豊川駅 (愛知県)（とよかわ）
Toyokawa Station (Osaka)	豊川駅 (大阪府)（とよかわ）
Toyokawainari Station	豊川稲荷駅（とよかわいなり）
Toyokoro Station	豊頃駅（とよころ）
Toyomane Station	豊間根駅（とよまね）
Toyomi Station	豊実駅（とよみ）
Toyonaga Station	豊永駅（とよなが）
Toyonaka Station	豊中駅（とよなか）
Toyono Station	豊野駅（とよの）
Toyonuma Station	豊沼駅（とよぬま）
Toyooka Station (Hyogo)	豊岡駅 (兵庫県)（とよおか）
Toyooka Station (Shizuoka)	豊岡駅 (静岡県)（とよおか）
Toyosaka Station	豊栄駅（とよさか）
Toyosato Station (Hokkaidō)	豊郷駅 (北海道)（とよさと）
Toyosato Station (Shiga)	豊郷駅 (滋賀県)（とよさと）
Toyoshiki Station	豊四季駅（とよしき）
Toyoshimizu Station	豊清水駅（とよしみず）
Toyoshina Station	豊科駅（とよしな）
Toyosu Station	豊洲駅（とよす）
Toyotashi Station	豊田市駅（とよたし）
Toyotomi Station	豊富駅（とよとみ）
Toyotsu Station (Fukuoka)	豊津駅 (福岡県)（とよつ）
Toyotsu Station (Osaka)	豊津駅 (大阪府)（とよつ）
Toyotsuueno Station	豊津上野駅（とよつうえの）
Toyoura Station	豊浦駅（とようら）
Tozawa Station	戸沢駅（とざわ）
Tozuka-Angyō Station	戸塚安行駅（とづかあんぎょう）

=== Tr ===
Trade Center-mae Station	トレードセンター前駅（とれーどせんたーまえ）

=== Tsu ===
Tsu Station	津駅（つ）
Tsubaki Station	椿駅（つばき）
Tsubame Station	燕駅（つばめ）
Tsubame-Sanjō Station	燕三条駅（つばめさんじょう）
Tsubata Station	津幡駅（つばた）
Tsubogawa Station	壺川駅（つぼがわ）
Tsuboi Station	坪井駅（つぼい）
Tsuboigawa-kōen Station	坪井川公園駅（つぼいがわこうえん）
Tsubojiri Station	坪尻駅（つぼじり）
Tsubuku Station	津福駅（つぶく）
Tsuchihashi Station	土橋駅 (愛知県)（つちはし）
Tsuchitaru Station	土樽駅（つちたる）
Tsuchiura Station	土浦駅（つちうら）
Tsuchiyama Station	土山駅（つちやま）
Tsuchizaki Station	土崎駅（つちざき）
Tsuchizawa Station	土沢駅（つちざわ）
Tsuda Station	津田駅（つだ）
Tsudanuma Station	津田沼駅（つだぬま）
Tsudayama Station	津田山駅（つだやま）
Tsūdō Station	通洞駅（つうどう）
Tsuga Station	都賀駅（つが）
Tsugaru-Futamata Station	津軽二股駅（つがるふたまた）
Tsugaru-Goshogawara Station	津軽五所川原駅（つがるごしょがわら）
Tsugaru-Hamana Station	津軽浜名駅（つがるはまな）
Tsugaru-Iizume Station	津軽飯詰駅（つがるいいづめ）
Tsugaru-Imabetsu Station	津軽今別駅（つがるいまべつ）
Tsugaruishi Station	津軽石駅（つがるいし）
Tsugaru-Miyata Station	津軽宮田駅（つがるみやた）
Tsugaru-Nakasato Station	津軽中里駅（つがるなかさと）
Tsugaru-Onoe Station	津軽尾上駅（つがるおのえ）
Tsugaru-Osawa Station	津軽大沢駅（つがるおおさわ）
Tsugaru-Shinjō Station	津軽新城駅（つがるしんじょう）
Tsugaru-Yunosawa Station	津軽湯の沢駅（つがるゆのさわ）
Tsugawa Station	津川駅（つがわ）
Tsuge Station	柘植駅（つげ）
Tsuiki Station	築城駅（ついき）
Tsuji Station	辻駅（つじ）
Tsujidō Station	辻堂駅（つじどう）
Tsukada Station	塚田駅（つかだ）
Tsukaguchi Station (JR West)	塚口駅 (JR西日本)（つかぐち）
Tsukaguchi Station (Hankyu)	塚口駅 (阪急)（つかぐち）
Tsukahara Station	塚原駅（つかはら）
Tsukamoto Station	塚本駅（つかもと）
Tsukanome Station	塚目駅（つかのめ）
Tsukayama Station	塚山駅（つかやま）
Tsukida Station	月田駅（つきだ）
Tsukigaoka Station	月ヶ岡駅（つきがおか）
Tsukigaseguchi Station	月ヶ瀬口駅（つきがせぐち）
Tsukiji Station	築地駅（つきじ）
Tsukijibashi Station	築地橋駅（つきじばし）
Tsukijiguchi Station	築地口駅（つきじぐち）
Tsukijishijō Station	築地市場駅（つきじしじょう）
Tsukimino Station	つきみ野駅（つきみの）
Tsukimiyama Station	月見山駅（つきみやま）
Tsukinoki Station	槻木駅（つきのき）
Tsukinokawa Station	調川駅（つきのかわ）
Tsukinowa Station	つきのわ駅（つきのわ）
Tsukioka Station (Niigata)	月岡駅 (新潟県)（つきおか）
Tsukioka Station (Toyama)	月岡駅 (富山県)（つきおか）
Tsukisamu-Chūō Station	月寒中央駅（つきさむちゅうおう）
Tsukishima Station	月島駅（つきしま）
Tsukiyama Station	築山駅（つきやま）
Tsukizaki Station	月崎駅（つきざき）
Tsuko Station	津古駅（つこ）
Tsukuba Station	つくば駅（つくば）
Tsukuba-Sancho Station	筑波山頂駅（つくばさんちょう）
Tsukuda Station (Gunma)	津久田駅（つくだ）
Tsukuda Station (Tokushima)	佃駅（つくだ）
Tsukuihama Station	津久井浜駅（つくいはま）
Tsukumi Station	津久見駅（つくみ）
Tsukumo Station	津久毛駅（つくも）
Tsukuno Station	津久野駅（つくの）
Tsukushino Station	つくし野駅（つくしの）
Tsumazaki Station	妻崎駅（つまざき）
Tsumori Station	津守駅（つもり）
Tsunagi Station	津奈木駅（つなぎ）
Tsunan Station	津南駅（つなん）
Tsunashima Station	綱島駅（つなしま）
Tsuneyama Station	常山駅（つねやま）
Tsunezumi Station	常澄駅（つねずみ）
Tsuno Station	都農駅（つの）
Tsunozu Station	都野津駅（つのづ）
Tsunogawa Station	角川駅（つのがわ）
Tsunoi Station	津ノ井駅（つのい）
Tsunomori Station	津ノ森駅（つのもり）
Tsuru-bunkadaigaku-mae Station	都留文科大学前駅（つるぶんかだいがくまえ）
Tsurudomari Station	鶴泊駅（つるどまり）
Tsuruga Station	敦賀駅（つるが）
Tsurugamine Station	鶴ヶ峰駅（つるがみね）
Tsurugaoka Station	鶴ヶ丘駅（つるがおか）
Tsurugasaka Station	鶴ヶ坂駅（つるがさか）
Tsurugashima Station	鶴ヶ島駅（つるがしま）
Tsurugata Station	鶴形駅（つるがた）
Tsurugi Station	鶴来駅（つるぎ）
Tsuruhara Station	鶴原駅（つるはら）
Tsuruhashi Station	鶴橋駅（つるはし）
Tsurui Station	鶴居駅（つるい）
Tsurukawa Station	鶴川駅（つるかわ）
Tsuruma Station	鶴間駅（つるま）
Tsurumai Station	鶴舞駅（つるまい）
Tsurumakionsen Station	鶴巻温泉駅（つるまきおんせん）
Tsurumaru Station	鶴丸駅（つるまる）
Tsurumi Station	鶴見駅（つるみ）
Tsurumi-Ichiba Station	鶴見市場駅（つるみいちば）
Tsurumi-Ono Station	鶴見小野駅（つるみおの）
Tsurumiryokuchi Station	鶴見緑地駅（つるみりょくち）
Tsurunuma Station	鶴沼駅（つるぬま）
Tsuruoka Station	鶴岡駅（つるおか）
Tsurusaki Station	鶴崎駅（つるさき）
Tsurusato Station	鶴里駅（つるさと）
Tsuruse Station	鶴瀬駅（つるせ）
Tsurushi Station	都留市駅（つるし）
Tsuruta Station	鶴田駅（つるた）
Tsuruwa Station	鶴羽駅（つるわ）
Tsushima Station	津島駅（つしま）
Tsushimanomiya Station	津島ノ宮駅（つしまのみや）
Tsushinmachi Station	津新町駅（つしんまち）
Tsusumi Station	都住駅（つすみ）
Tsutsui Station (Aomori)	筒井駅 (青森県)（つつい）
Tsutsui Station (Nara)	筒井駅 (奈良県)（つつい）
Tsutsuishi Station	筒石駅（つついし）
Tsutsujigaoka Station (Miyagi)	榴ヶ岡駅（つつじがおか）
Tsutsujigaoka Station (Tokyo)	つつじヶ丘駅（つつじがおか）
Tsuwano Station	津和野駅（つわの）
Tsuya Station	津谷駅（つや）
Tsuyama Station	津山駅（つやま）
Tsuyamaguchi Station	津山口駅（つやまぐち）
Tsuyazaki Station	津屋崎駅（つやざき）
Tsuzu Station	通津駅（つづ）
Tsuzuki Station	都筑駅（つづき）
Tsuzuki-Fureai-no-Oka Station	都筑ふれあいの丘駅（つづきふれあいのおか）
Tsuzumigataki Station	鼓滝駅（つづみがたき）
Tsuzumigaura Station	鼓ヶ浦駅（つづみがうら）
