= Torokko Hozukyō Station =

Railway station in Kyoto, Japan

Torokko Hozukyō Station: トロッコ保津峡駅; とろっこほづきょう
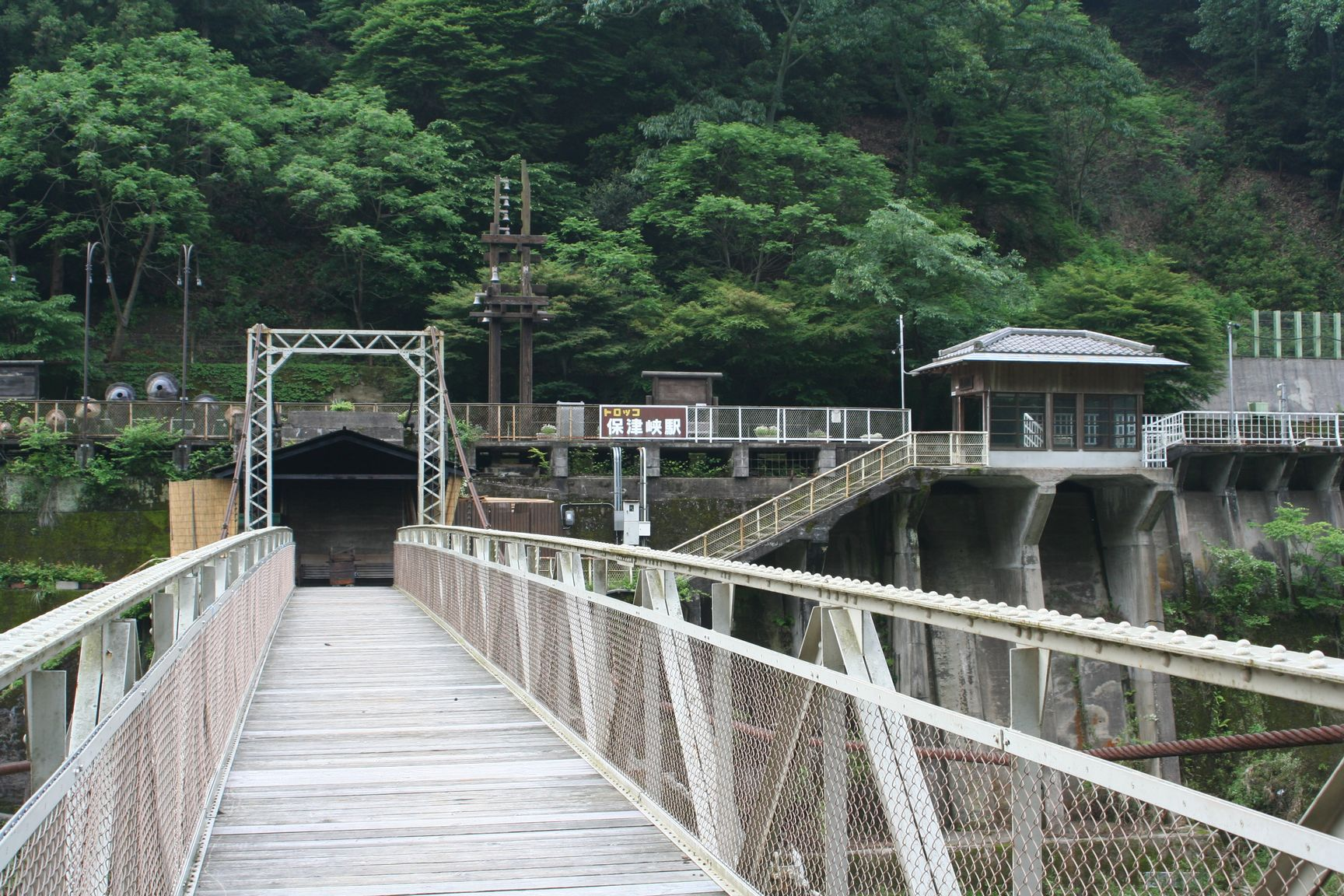
- Station and walkway approach in 2011

General information
- Location: Kita Matsuoyama, Arashiyama District, Nishikyō Ward, Kyoto City; Kyoto Prefecture; Japan
- Coordinates: 35.026111°N 135.646278°E
- Owner: Logo of the West Railway Company (JR West)
- Operator: Sagano Sightseeing Railway
- Line: Sagano Scenic Line
- Distance: 3.4 km (2.1 mi) from Torokko Saga
- Platforms: 1 side platform
- Tracks: 1

Construction
- Structure type: At-grade

Other information
- Website: Official website (in Japanese)

History
- Opened: 27 April 1991; 35 years ago (re-opened)

Passengers
- FY 2023: 3 daily
Location
- Location within Kyoto Prefecture Location within Kansai region Location within Japan

Torokko Hozukyō Station (トロッコ保津峡駅, Torokko Hozukyō-eki) is the third train station on the Sagano Scenic Line, a sightseeing train that follows the picturesque Hozukyo Ravine of the old JR West Sagano Line. It is located in Kameoka, Kyoto, Japan.

== Station layout ==
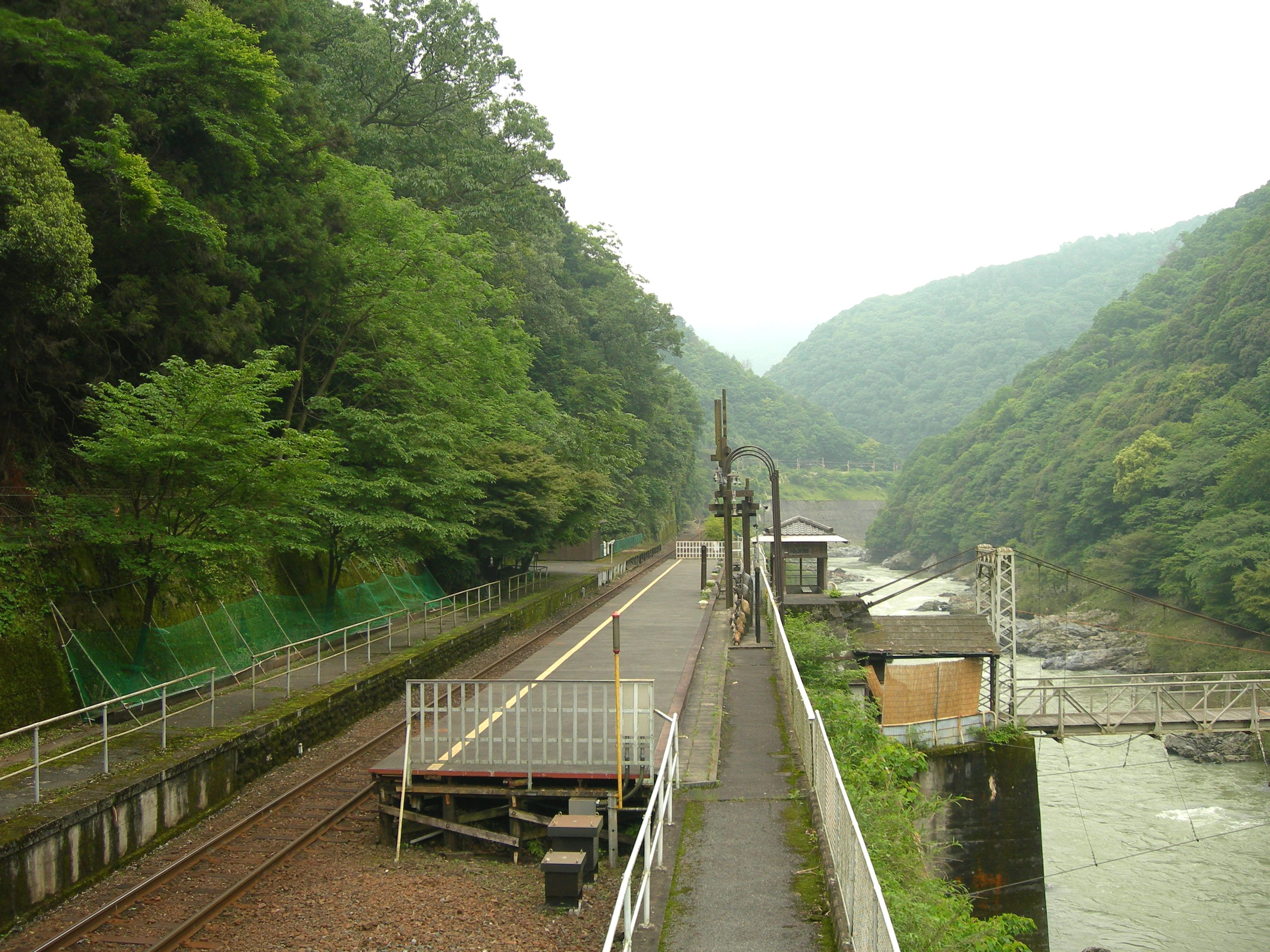
View of the station platform

The station consists of a single ground-level platform servicing trains to Torokko Saga and Torokko Kameoka.

== Adjacent stations ==
| « | Service | » |
Sagano Scenic Line
| Torokko Arashiyama | Local | Torokko Kameoka |
