= Randen-Saga Station =

Tram station in Kyoto, Japan

Randen-Saga Station: 嵐電嵯峨駅; らんでんさが
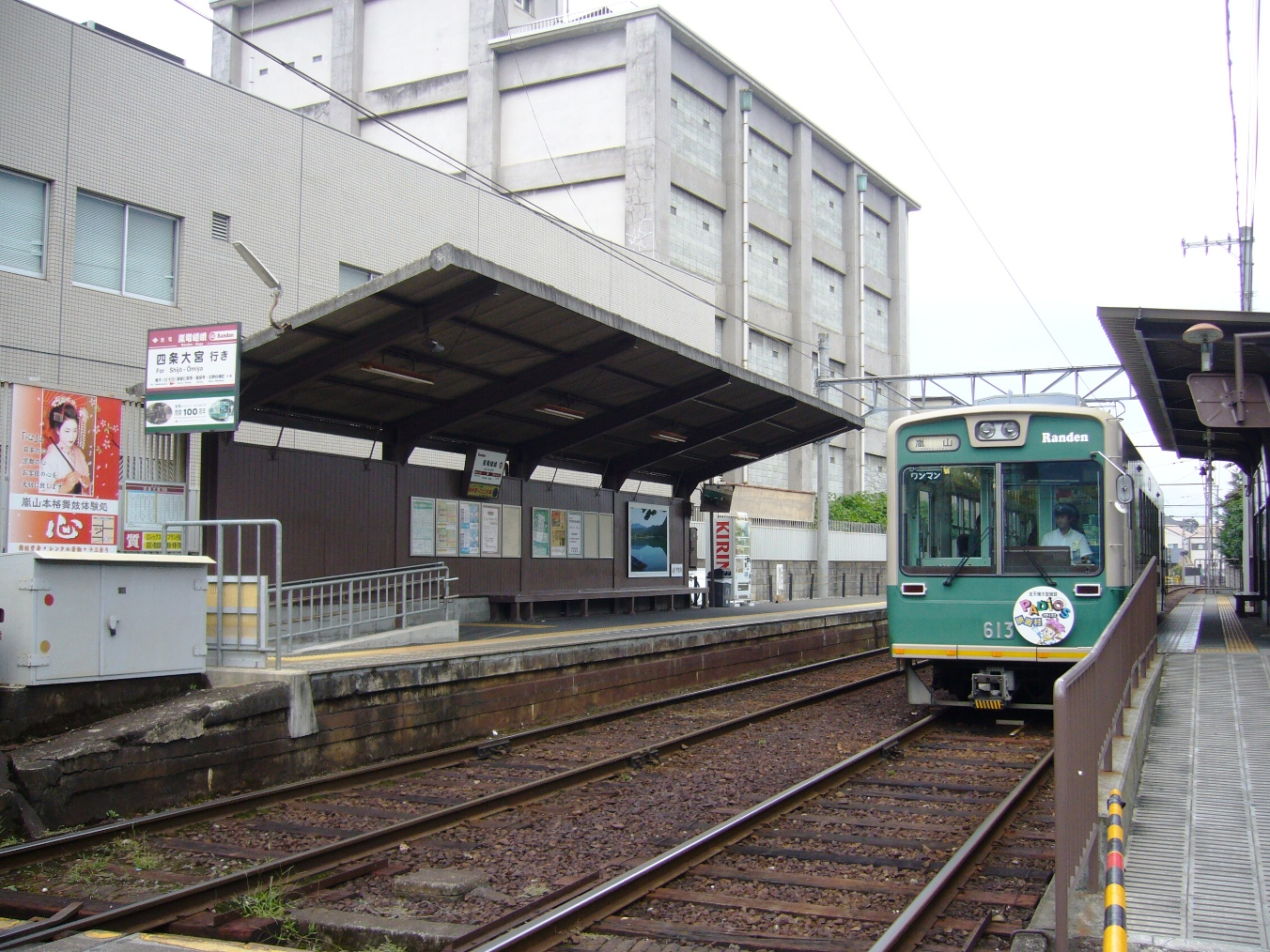
- Station platforms, 2007

General information
- Location: Ukyo-ku, Kyoto; Kyoto Prefecture; Japan
- Coordinates: 35.0164451°N 135.6814425°E
- Operator: Keifuku Electric Railroad
- Line: Randen Arashiyama Line
- Distance: 6.9km from Shijō-Ōmiya
- Tracks: 2
- Connections: JR West Sagano Line (Saga-Arashiyama); Sagano Scenic Railway (Torokko Saga)

Construction
- Structure type: At-grade

Other information
- Station code: A12
- Website: Official (in Japanese)

History
- Opened: March 25, 1910

Passengers
- FY2015: 0.6 million
Location

Randen-Saga Station (嵐電嵯峨駅, Randen-Saga-eki) is a tram stop in Ukyo-ku, Kyoto, Japan. The station is serviced by the Randen Arashiyama Line that begins at Shijō-Ōmiya and continues west to Arashiyama.

== Station layout ==
The station consists of two platforms at ground level. Platform 1 services trams to Arashiyama, platform 2 for Shijō-Ōmiya.

== Adjacent stations ==
«	Service	»
Randen Arashiyama Line
Rokuōin (A11)	Local	Arashiyama (A13)
