= Torokko Arashiyama Station =

Railway station in Kyoto, Japan

Torokko Arashiyama Station: トロッコ嵐山駅; とろっこあらしやま
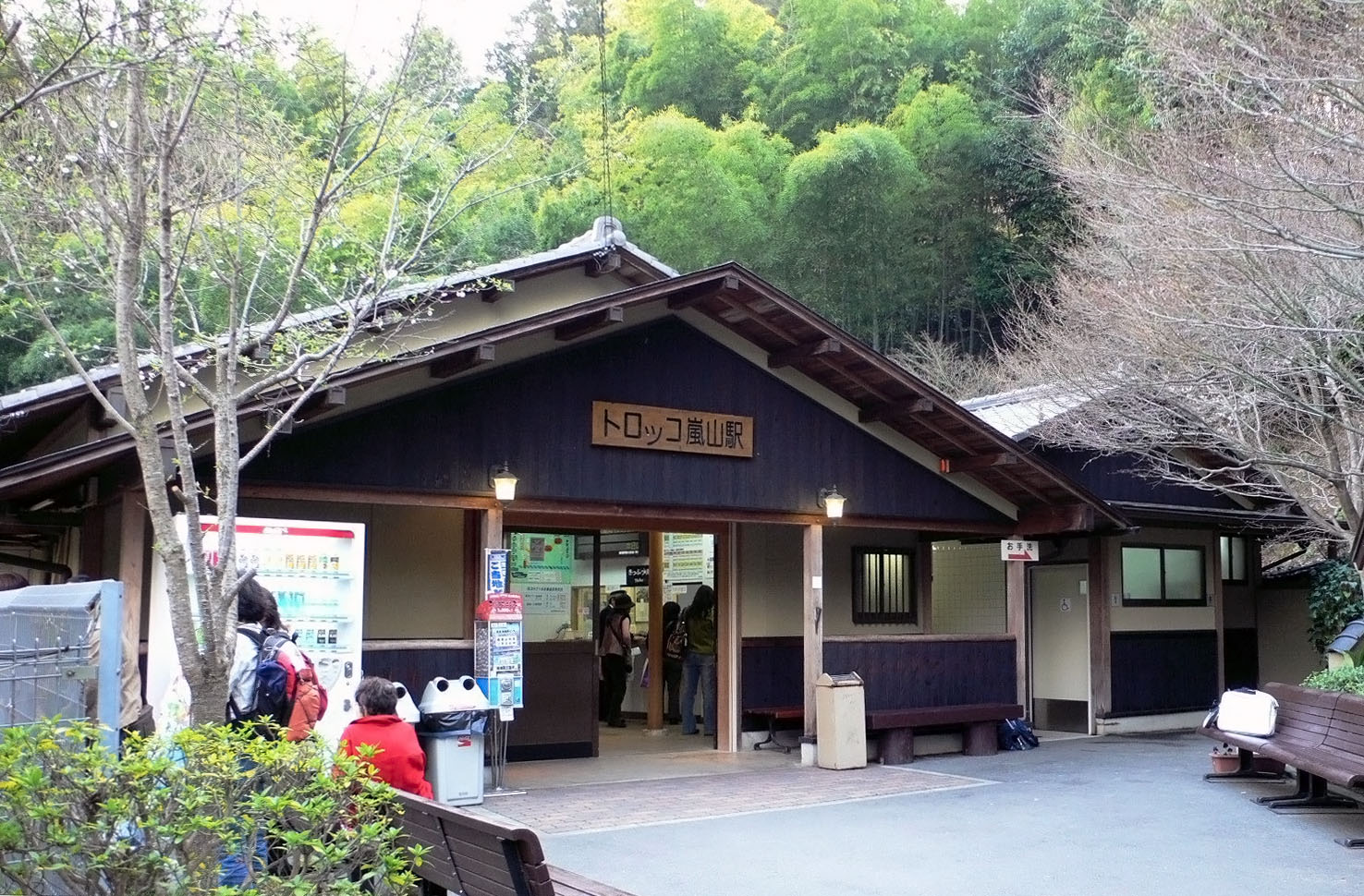
- Station building in 2007

General information
- Location: Saga Ogurayamacho, Ukyō Ward, Kyoto City; Kyoto Prefecture; Japan
- Coordinates: 35°1′1.75″N 135°40′12.94″E
- Owner: JR West
- Operator: Sagano Sightseeing Railway
- Line: Sagano Scenic Line
- Distance: 1.0 km (0.62 mi) from Torokko Saga
- Platforms: 1 side platform
- Tracks: 1

Construction
- Structure type: At-grade

Other information
- Website: Official website (in Japanese)

History
- Opened: 27 April 1991; 35 years ago

Passengers
- FY 2023: 400 daily
Location
- Location within Kyoto Prefecture Location within Kansai region Location within Japan

Torokko Arashiyama Station (トロッコ嵐山駅, Torokko Arashiyama-eki) is the second train station on the Sagano Scenic Line, a sightseeing train that follows the picturesque Hozukyo Ravine of the old JR West Sagano Line. It is located in Kamigyo-ku, Kyoto, Japan.

== Station layout ==
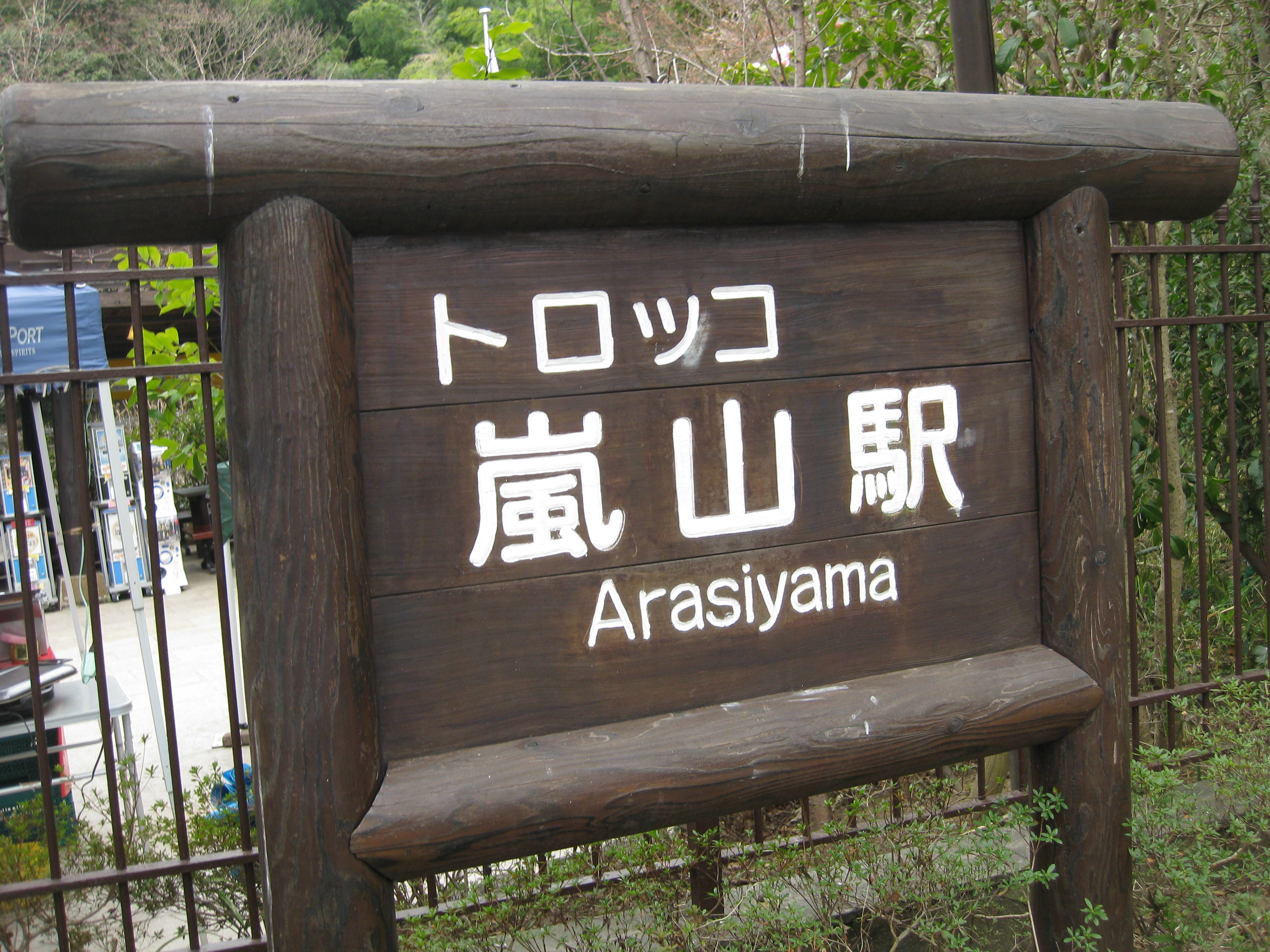
Wooden station nameplate

The station consists of a single ground-level platform servicing trains to Torokko Saga and Torokko Kameoka. Owing to the large number of stairs between the station and the platform, it is not wheelchair accessible.

== Adjacent stations ==
| « | Service | » |
Sagano Scenic Line
| Torokko Saga | Local | Torokko Hozukyō |
