= Umahori Station =

Railway station in Kameoka, Kyoto Prefecture, Japan

Umahori Station 馬堀駅
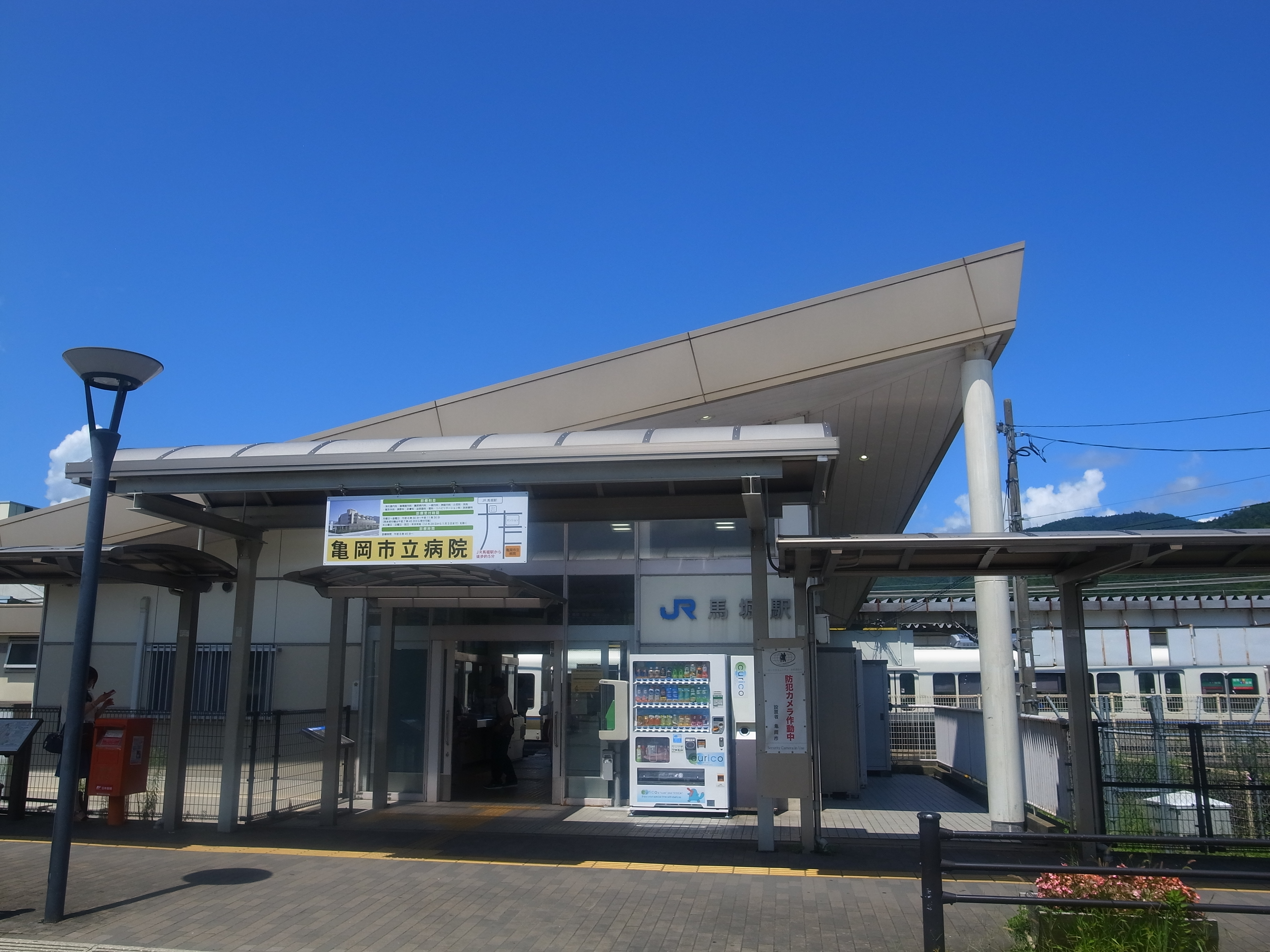
- Umahori Station, August 2017

General information
- Location: Rokunotsubo-29 Shinochoumahori, Kameoka-shi, Kyoto-fu 621-0823; Japan
- Coordinates: 35.0104°N 135.6021°E
- Owner: West Japan Railway Company
- Operator: West Japan Railway Company
- Line: Sagano Line (San'in Main Line)
- Distance: 18.1 km (11.2 miles) from Kyoto
- Platforms: 2 side platforms
- Tracks: 2
- Connections: Bus stop

Construction
- Structure type: Ground level
- Accessible: Yes

Other information
- Status: Staffed (Midori no Madoguchi )
- Station code: JR-E10
- Website: Official website

History
- Opened: 20 July 1935

Passengers
- FY 2023: 8,446 daily

Services
Preceding station	JR West	Following station
Kameoka towards Sonobe	Sagano Line Local	Hozukyo towards Kyoto
Location
- Location within Kyoto Prefecture Location within Japan

Umahori Station (馬堀駅, Umahori-eki) is a passenger railway station located in the city of Kameoka, Kyoto Prefecture, Japan, operated by West Japan Railway Company (JR West).

== Lines ==
Umahori Station is served by the San'in Main Line (Sagano Line), and is located 18.1 kilometres (11.2 miles) from the terminus of the line at Kyoto.

== Station layout ==
The station consists of two opposed side platforms connected to the station building by a footbridge. The station has a Midori no Madoguchi staffed ticket office.

=== Platforms ===
1	■ San'in Main Line	for Kyoto
2	■ San'in Main Line	for Kameoka, Sonobe and Fukuchiyama

== History ==
Umahori Station opened on 20 July 1935. With the privatization of the Japan National Railways (JNR) on 1 April 1987, the station came under the aegis of the West Japan Railway Company. On 5 March 1989 the station was moved as a result of the opening of the new line. The old line is now used for the Sagano Scenic Railway.

Station numbering was introduced in March 2018 with Umahori being assigned station number JR-E10.

== Passenger statistics ==
In fiscal 2019, the station was used by an average of 4,672 passengers daily.

== Surrounding area ==
- Torokko Kameoka Station, the terminal of the Sagano Scenic Railway, is approximately 500 meters from Umahori Station.
- Shinomura Hachiman-gu
- Kameoka Municipal Hospital
- Kameoka City Shotoku Junior High School

== See also ==
- List of railway stations in Japan
