= DEC743 =

Japanese hybrid locomotive type

Type and origin
- Power type: Hybrid diesel–electric
- Builder: Kinki Sharyo
- Build date: 2026–present
Specifications
- Gauge: 1,067 mm (3 ft 6 in)
- Loco weight: 55 t (54 long tons; 61 short tons)
- Loco brake: Regenerative braking
Performance figures
- Maximum speed: 75 km/h (47 mph)
Career
- Operators: JR West; Sagano Scenic Railway
- Number in class: 4 (JR West); 1 (Sagano Scenic Railway)
- Numbers: DEC743-1, DEC743-2, DEC743-7, DEC743-8 (JR West); DEC743-1001 (Sagano Scenic Railway)
- Delivered: June 2026
- First run: 2027 (scheduled)

The DEC743 (DEC743形) is a hybrid diesel–electric locomotive type to be operated by West Japan Railway Company (JR West) and Sagano Scenic Railway in Japan from the first half of 2027. Nine locomotives are to be built.

== Design ==
The DEC743 locomotives adopt a hybrid system which integrates components from electric and diesel railcar systems. Energy generated from the diesel engine and stored in the onboard batteries is used to drive the motors. When deceleration takes place, the batteries are recharged through regenerative braking. The front ends are built with impact-absorbing structures.

The standard JR West livery consists of vermilion and grey with a white stripe between the two colours.

The design concept of the new rolling stock for the Sagano Romantic Train was overseen by GK Design Soken Hiroshima. DEC743-7, DEC743-8 and DEC743-1001 are finished in the Sagano Scenic Railway livery which includes a black and red base. Of these, DEC743-1001 features logo and symbol marks based on the autumn leaves, cherry blossoms, clear stream, civil engineering heritage tunnel and bamboo groves.

== Operations ==
The JR West DEC743 locomotives are planned to replace several ageing locomotives such as the Class DE10 on ballast spreading services as well as empty train towing and shunting services. Ballast train operations with DEC743 locomotives will consist of two locomotives and four ballast spreading hopper cars in the middle of each train formation.

The sole Sagano Scenic Railway locomotive, DEC743-1001, will be used to tow the new four-car Sagano Romantic Train set.

== History ==
On 21 March 2025, Sagano Scenic Railway announced its plans to introduce new rolling stock in 2027 to replace its ageing Class DE10 locomotive that was acquired from JR West and passenger cars that were converted from Toki 25000 freight cars.

Details of the new hybrid locomotive type and twelve new ballast spreading hopper cars on order were first announced by JR West on 22 October 2025.

The designation of the new hybrid locomotive type was revealed on 16 June 2026. The first four locomotives (DEC743-1, DEC743-7, DEC743-8 and DEC743-1001) were officially unveiled on that same day.

== Fleet list ==
Number	Manufacturer	Date delivered	Depot allocation
DEC743-1	Kinki Sharyo	25 June 2026	Shimonoseki
DEC743-2	Kinki Sharyo	9 July 2026	Shimonoseki
DEC743-7	Kinki Sharyo	18 June 2026	Miyahara
DEC743-8	Kinki Sharyo	18 June 2026	Miyahara
DEC743-1001	Kinki Sharyo	18 June 2026	

== Classification ==
While technically a hybrid locomotive type, the DEC743 is classified by JR West according to its diesel electric car numbering scheme.
