= Saga-Arashiyama Station =

Railway station in Kyoto, Japan

Saga-Arashiyama Station 嵯峨嵐山駅
- South side of the station

General information
- Location: 11-1, Saga-Tenryuji Kurumamichicho, Ukyō, Kyoto, Kyoto （京都市右京区嵯峨天龍寺車道町11-1） Japan
- Coordinates: 35°1′7.47″N 135°40′52.71″E
- Operator: JR West
- Line: Sagano Line
- Platforms: 2 Island platforms
- Tracks: 4
- Connections: Bus stop

Construction
- Structure type: Ground level
- Accessible: Yes

Other information
- Station code: JR-E08

History
- Opened: 1897
- Former names: Saga (until 1994)

Passengers
- FY 2023: 17,080 daily

Services
Preceding station	JR West	Following station
Kameoka towards Sonobe	Sagano Line Rapid	Emmachi towards Kyoto
Hozukyo towards Sonobe	Sagano Line Local	Uzumasa towards Kyoto
Location

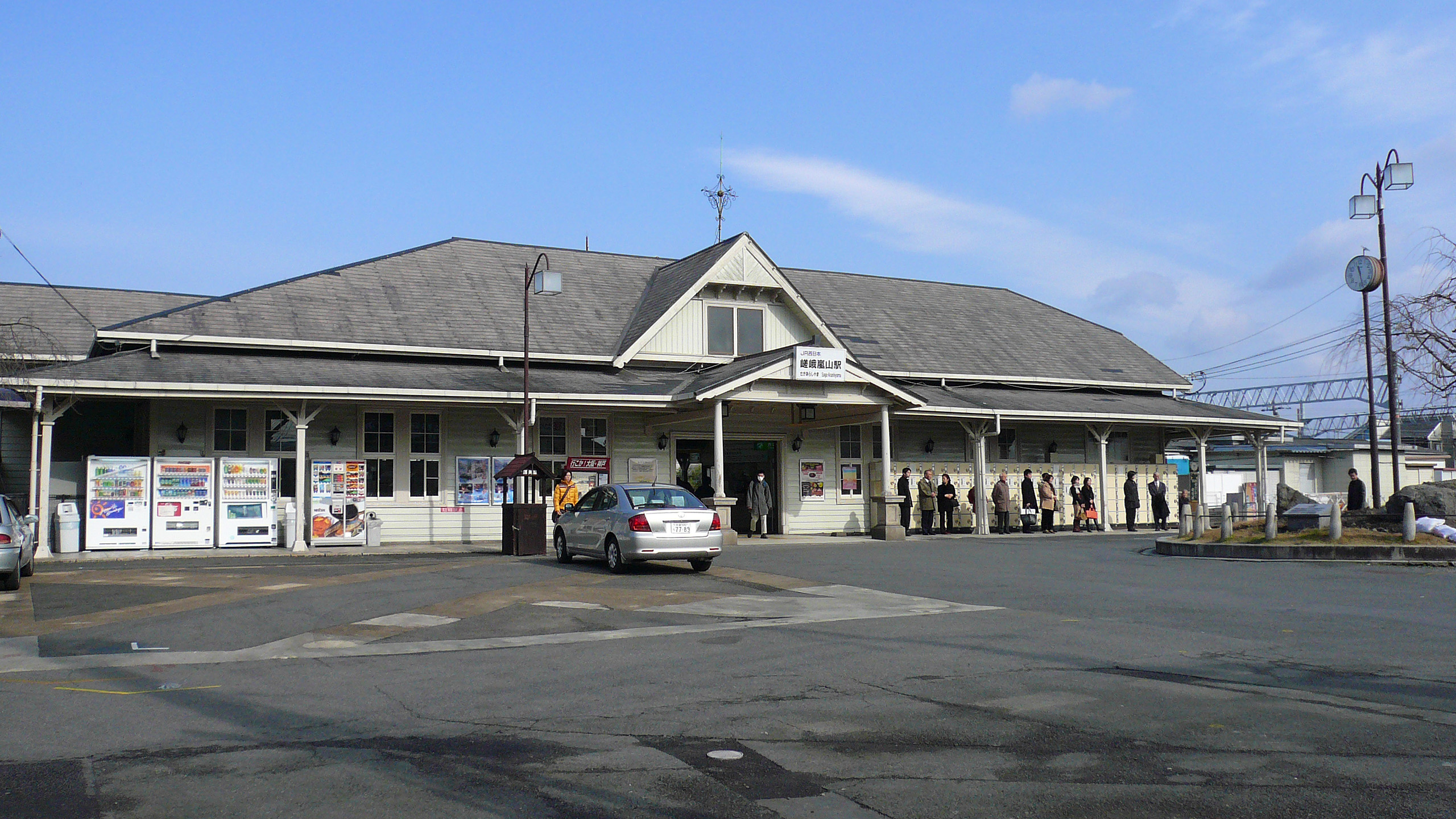
Former station building (demolished in 2007)

Saga-Arashiyama Station (嵯峨嵐山駅, Saga-Arashiyama-eki), formerly known as Saga Station, is a railway station situated in Ukyo-ku, Kyoto, Japan, operating on the Sanin Main Line (Sagano Line) under the management of the West Japan Railway Company (JR West). It serves as the starting point for the Sagano Scenic Railway.

Saga-Arashiyama Station holds historical significance as one of Kyoto's southernmost railway stations. Originally established as the eighth stop along the San'in Main Line, linking Kyoto and Sonobe, it operates as a minor transportation hub for sightseeing, facilitating connections between light rail, bus, and tram services.

Adjacent to Saga-Arashiyama Station is the Arashiyama Station. Originally part of the Keifuku Electric Railroad, Saga-Arashiyama Station was absorbed into the West Japan Railway Company (JR West) on March 25, 1910. At that time, the station served an average of 6,000 passengers daily.

Saga-Arashiyama Station is surrounded by notable landmarks, including the Kyoto Prefectural Kitasaga High School to the north, the Saga University of Arts Hombu Campus to the south, and the Kyoto Prefectural Sagano High School to the east. To the west lie temples and a shrine. The station is closely linked to the Sagano Scenic Railway to the west and Randen-Saga Station to the south.

== History ==
Saga-Arashiyama Station was established in early 1897 as Saga Station, serving as the terminus of the first line of the Kyoto Railway, which ran between Nijō and Saga. This line, precursor to the San'in Main Line, commenced operations on February 15, 1897. Following the nationalization of the Kyōto Railway, it was renamed the "Kyoto line," and subsequently, the San'in Main Line. The extension of the line towards Sonobe was completed in 1899. On September 4, 1994, the station was renamed Saga-Urashima Station.

With the privatization of the Japanese National Railways and the division of its assets, the Kyoto line came under the management of the West Japan Railway Company (JR West). The renaming of Saga Station to Saga-Arashiyama Station in 1994 was intended to associate it with the renowned district of Arashiyama, located in the western area of Kyoto Prefecture, thereby enhancing its tourism appeal.

Saga-Arashiyama Station stands as the sole JR station nearest to the western suburbs of Kyoto, as well as to the iconic Togetsu-kyō Bridge spanning the Katsura River. However, It is important not to confuse its location with that of the Arashiyama area. In local context, Saga-Arashiyama Station lies on the north shore of Katsuragawa Station, commonly referred to as Sagano. Conversely, the south shore encompasses the true Arashiyama, home to renowned attractions such as the UNESCO World Heritage site, Tenryu-Ji Temple, all within walking distance from Saga-Arashiyama Station, making it a significant hub for tourists.

The currently operational building structure at Saga-Arashiyama Station is the 2nd generation, which was completed and fully functional by the end of 2008. Prior to this, the station utilized the 1st generation building, which has been in continuous use since the inauguration of the Kyoto Railway in 1897. However, the original building, serving as the earliest service center under the West Japan Railway Company (JR West), was eventually demolished.

The main terminal, Arashiyama Main Station, of the Arashiyama Honsen Line is situated a few blocks south of the station (approximately 300 meters away), making it easily accessible by foot. In contrast, the terminal Hankyu Arashiyama Station of the Hankyu Arashiyama Line is located on the southern side of Katsura, necessitating a 20-minute walk to reach the Togetsu-kyō Bridge.

Station numbering was implemented in March 2018, with Saga-Arashiyama designated as station number JR-E08.

== Station layout ==
Saga-Arashiyama Station features two island platforms accommodating four train routes in total, along with ground-level and overhead crossing equipment. Platforms 1 and 2 serve trains heading in the upward direction towards Kyoto, while platforms 3 and 4 serve trains heading downward towards Sonobe. There are no transfer platforms for other train lines at Saga-Arashiyama Station.

1, 2	■ Sagano Line	for Kyōto
3, 4	■ Sagano Line	for Kameoka, Sonobe and Fukuchiyama

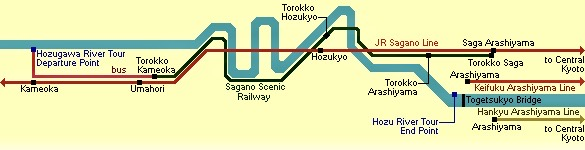
Railway map of Sagano Line

== Platforms ==
The Saga-Arashiyama Station underwent a redesign by the West Japan Railway Company in the late 1990s. Originally intended to serve as a transfer station along the Sagano Line, its significance heightened following the surge in Kyoto tourism since 1994, coinciding with the renaming of Arashiyama Station to Saga-Arashiyama Station.

To date, the station has welcomed over 7.4 million foreign passengers, drawn to Saga-Arashiyama for its attractions. Including domestic tourists, the station has served more than 50 million visitors, a remarkable figure considering Kyoto's population stands at just 1.7 million.

== Adjacent stations ==
One route to reach Saga-Arashiyama Station from central Kyoto is by taking the Hankyu Line to Omiya Station, then transferring to the Keifuku Randen tramline. The tram, which features a traditional trolley car, typically takes approximately 20 minutes to reach the destination.

Alternatively, travelers can opt for the Sagano Line, which operates under the San'in Main Line. Trains, either local or rapid, depart for Sonobe Station from central Kyoto every 15 minutes. Upon arrival at Sagano Station, it's just a short 10-minute walk to Saga-Arashiyama Station.

== Connecting lines from Saga-Arashiyama ==
- Sagano Scenic Railway (Torokko Saga Station is located in front of Saga-Arashiyama Station)
- Keifuku Electric Railroad (Randen Saga Station is located about 300 m south of Saga-Arashiyama Station)

Several connecting services provide access to Saga-Arashiyama Station. While Japan Railways offers the fastest route, you can also reach the station via Keifuku Railways (Randen-Saga Station), Hankyu Railways, bus lines, or by personal vehicle.

=== Bus services ===
Bus transportation services connect Saga-Arashiyama Station with various parts of Kyoto. You can catch Kyoto city bus number 28 and get off at Arashiyama Tenryuji-mae. The total trip takes approximately 30 minutes. This bus route runs from Kyoto Station to Tenryu-ji Temple and Arashiyama, with a bus fare of 230 yen for adults and 120 yen for children under 12 years old.

=== Sightseeing Tram services ===
The Sagano Romantic Train, operated by the Sagano Scenic Railway in the Saga-Arashiyama area of western Kyoto, provides a scenic sightseeing experience. Known as the “Sagano Torokko Ressha” in Japanese, this train utilizes old carriages dating back to the 19th century. Passengers aboard the Sagano Romantic Train can enjoy scenic views of the countryside along the Hozugawa River gorge. The Sagano Romantic Train offers a scenic experience, especially during autumn, with each season showcasing its unique landscapes.

One-way tickets for adults and children are priced at 620 yen and 310 yen respectively. There are a total of 8 train rides available from 9 am to 4 pm daily at Saga-Torokko Station. Reservations are required for the Sagano Scenic Railway, except for car No. 5, which allows for on-the-day purchase, along with a limited number of standing tickets available for same-day travel.

=== Tram services ===
The Keifuku Randen Tram line is operated by the independent company Keifuku Electric Railroad. Running from east to west, the Arashiyama line of the tram travels between Shijo-Omiya Station and Keifuku Arashiyama Station, also known as Arashiyama Station. The distance between Keifuku Arashiyama Station and Saga Arashiyama Station is approximately a 20-minute walk. The tram fare for adults is 210 yen and for children is 110 yen.

Moreover, since the Keifuku Randen Tram line is operated by a private company (Keifuku Electric Railroad), it is not covered by other Japan rail passes. Instead, the company offers a 1-Day tram pass for unlimited rides on the Keifuku Randen Tram line at a discounted rate.
