= Emmachi Station =

Railway station in Kyoto, Japan

Coordinates: 35°1′5.5″N 135°43′50″E

Emmachi Station 円町駅
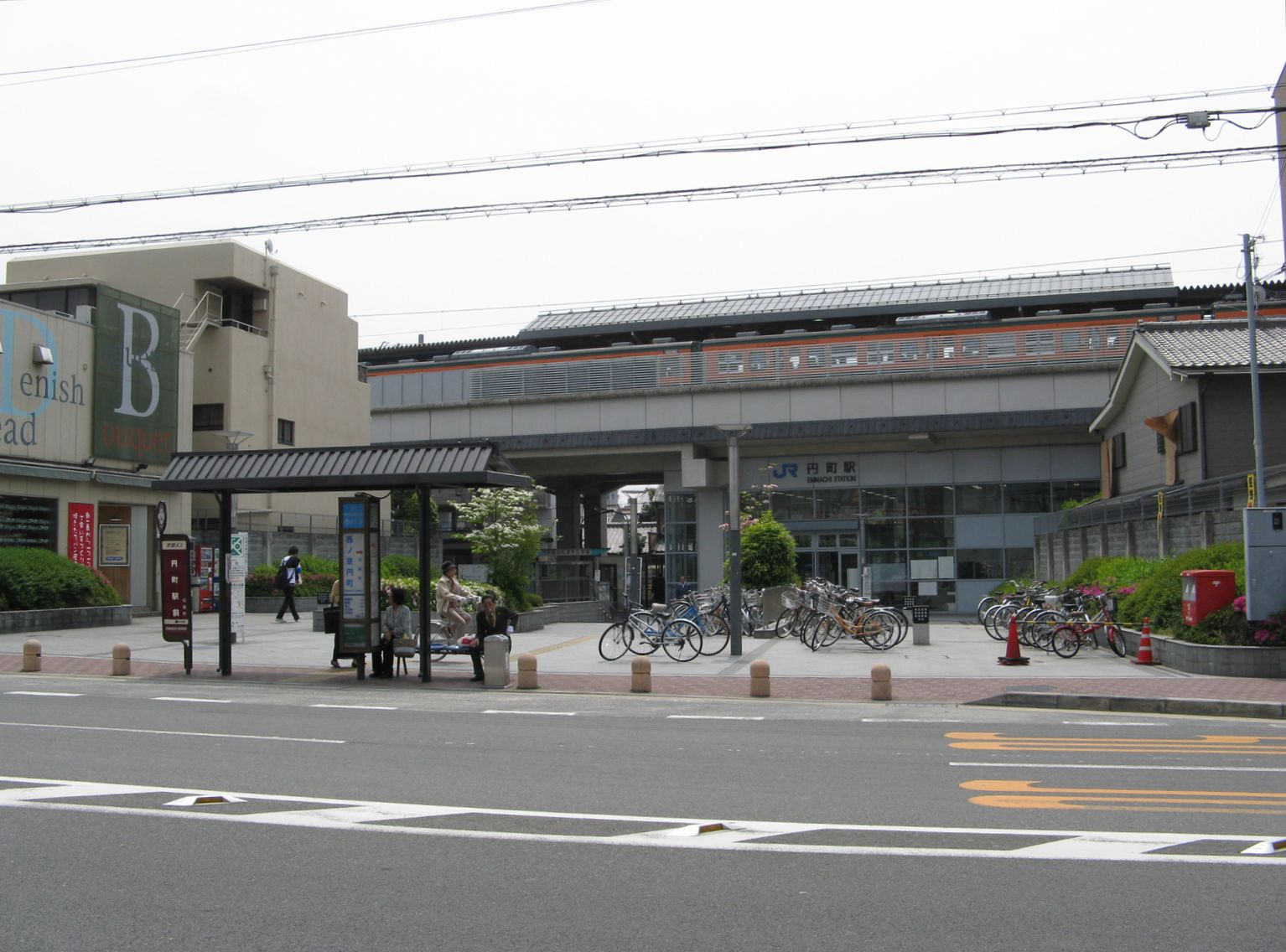

General information
- Location: Ukyō, Kyoto, Kyoto; Japan
- Operator: JR West
- Line: Sagano Line
- Platforms: 1 Island platform
- Tracks: 2
- Connections: Bus stop

Construction
- Structure type: Elevated
- Accessible: Yes

Other information
- Station code: JR-E05

History
- Opened: 23 September 2000

Passengers
- FY 2023: 15,538 daily

Services
Preceding station	JR West	Following station
Saga-Arashiyama towards Sonobe	Sagano Line Rapid	Nijo towards Kyoto
Hanazono towards Sonobe	Sagano Line Local	Nijo towards Kyoto
Location

Emmachi Station (円町駅, Enmachi-eki) is a train station in Nakagyo-ku, Kyoto, Japan.

== Lines ==
- West Japan Railway Company (JR West)
  - Sagano Line (Sanin Main Line)

== Layout ==
The elevated station has an island platform with two tracks.

1	■ Sagano Line	for Kyoto
2	■ Sagano Line	for Kameoka, Sonobe and Fukuchiyama

== History ==
Emmachi Station opened on 23 September 2000, concurrently with the opening of the elevated double tracks of the section between Nijō and Hanazono.

Station numbering was introduced in March 2018 with Emmachi being assigned station number JR-E05.
