= Taya Station =

Railway station in Tokoname, Aichi Prefecture, Japan

Taya Station 多屋駅

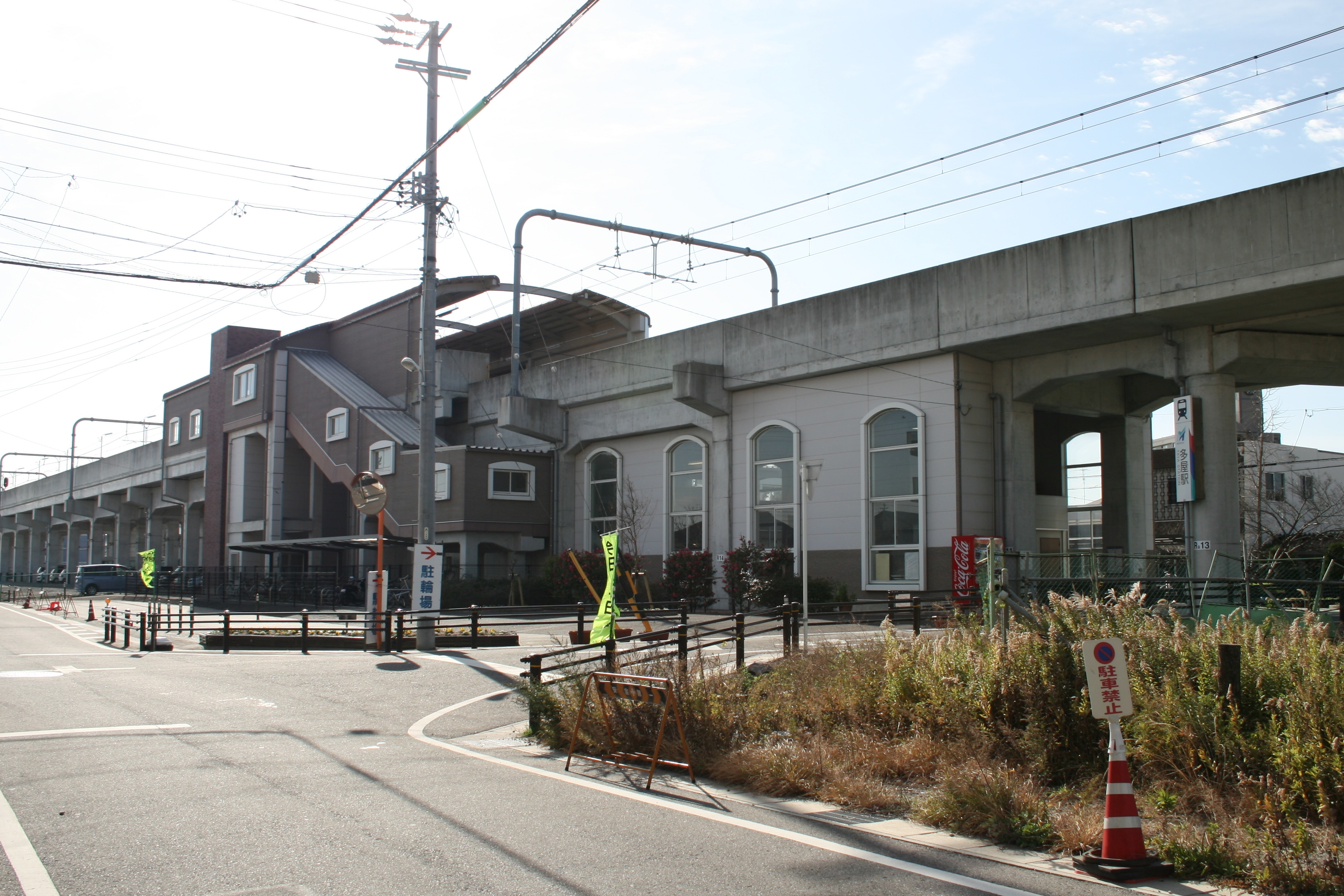
- Taya Station in December 2009

General information
- Location: 5 Tayacho, Tokoname-shi, Aichi-ken 479-0839; Japan
- Coordinates: 34.8970°N 136.8308°E
- Operator: Meitetsu
- Line: ■ Meitetsu Tokoname Line
- Distance: 26.8 kilometers from Jingū-mae
- Platforms: 2 side platforms

Other information
- Status: Unstaffed
- Station code: TA21
- Website: Official website

History
- Opened: March 29, 1913

Passengers
- FY2016: 1291 daily

Services
Preceding station	Meitetsu	Following station
Tokoname Terminus	Tokoname Line Local	Enokido towards Jingū-mae
Location
- Location within Aichi Prefecture Location within Japan

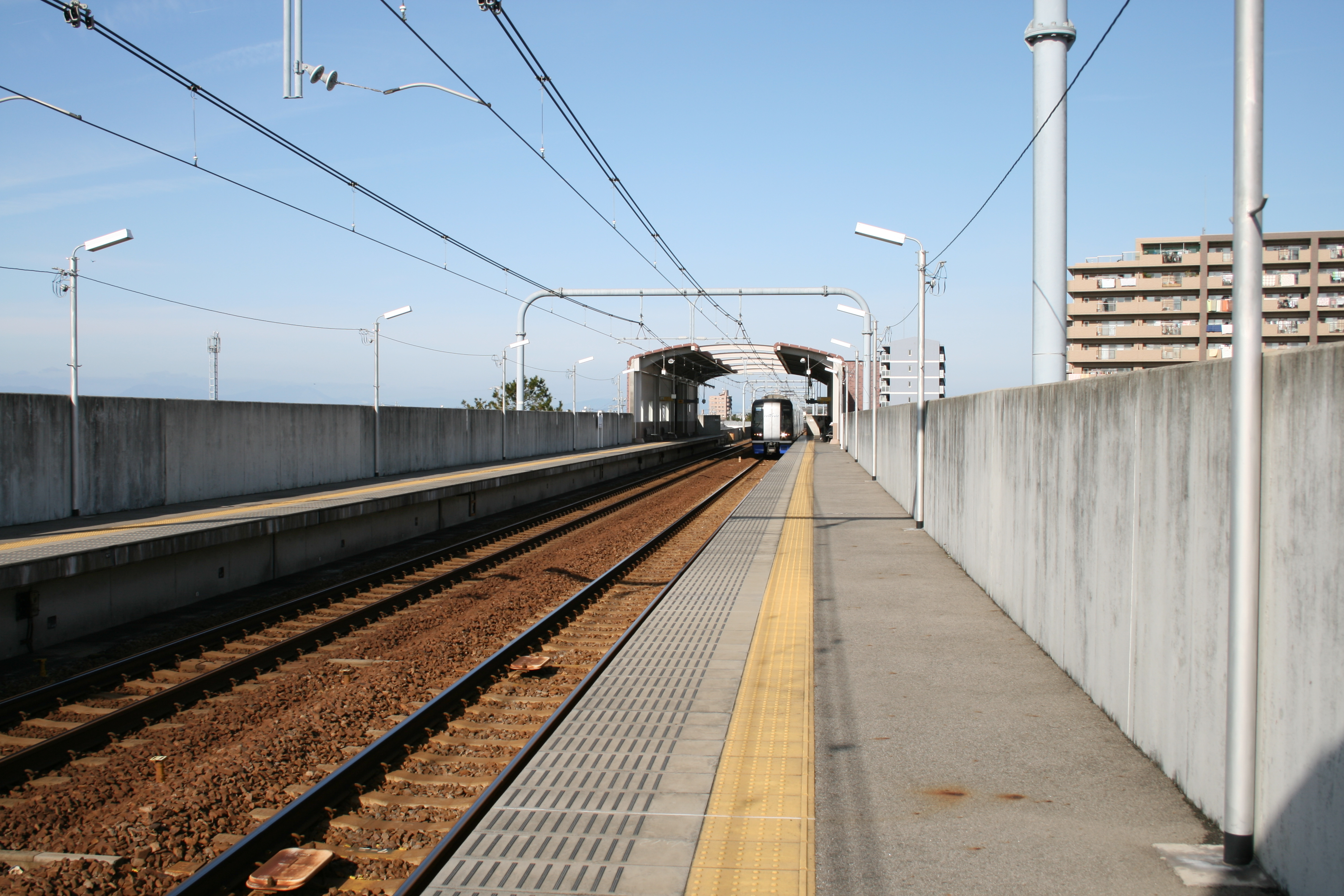
Platforms

Taya Station (多屋駅, Taya-eki) is a railway station in the city of Tokoname, Aichi, Japan, operated by Meitetsu.

== Lines ==
Taya Station is served by the Meitetsu Tokoname Line, and is located 26.8 kilometers from the starting point of the line at Jingū-mae.

== Station layout ==
The station has two opposed elevated side platforms with the station building underneath. The station has automated ticket machines, Manaca automated turnstiles and it is unattended.

=== Platforms ===
1	■ Tokoname Line	For Tokoname and Central Japan International Airport
2	■ Tokoname Line	For Ōtagawa and Jingū-mae

== Station history ==
Taya Station was opened on March 29, 1913 as a station on the Aichi Electric Railway Company. The Aichi Electric Railway became part of the Meitetsu group on August 1, 1935. The station was closed in 1944, but was reopened on October 1, 1949. The station has been unattended since October 1, 1979. The station was closed again from January 2002 to October 2003 due to construction which elevated the tracks and replaced the station building. In January 2005, the Tranpass system of magnetic fare cards with automatic turnstiles was implemented.

== Passenger statistics ==
In fiscal 2016, the station was used by an average of 1,291 passengers daily (boarding passengers only).

== Surrounding area ==
- INAX

== See also ==
- List of railway stations in Japan
