= Torokko Saga Station =

Railway station in Kyoto, Japan

Saga Torokko Station: トロッコ嵯峨駅; とろっこさが
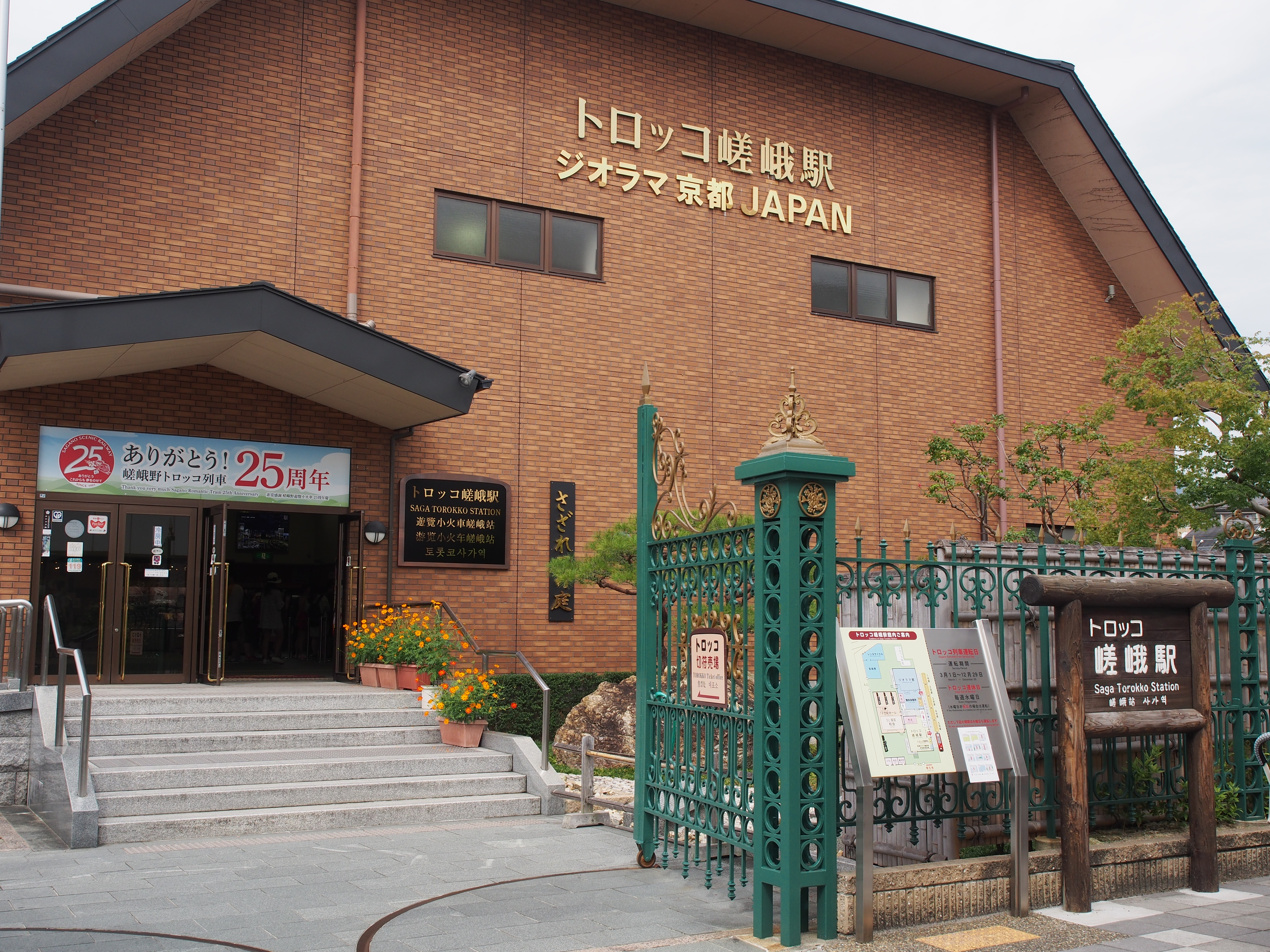
- Station building in 2016

General information
- Location: Sagatenryu-ji Kurimichicho, Ukyō Ward, Kyoto City; Kyoto Prefecture; Japan
- Coordinates: 35°1′7″N 135°40′50.5″E
- Owner: JR West
- Operator: Sagano Sightseeing Railway
- Line: Sagano Scenic Line
- Platforms: 1 side platform
- Tracks: 1
- Connections: JR West Sagano Line (Saga-Arashiyama); Keifuku Randen Arashiyama Line (Randen-Saga)

Construction
- Structure type: At-grade

Other information
- Website: Official website (in Japanese)

History
- Opened: 27 April 1991; 35 years ago

Passengers
- FY 2023: 547 daily
Location
- Location within Kyoto Prefecture Location within Kansai region Location within Japan

Torokko Saga Station (トロッコ嵯峨駅, Torokko Saga-eki), also referred to as Saga Torokko Station in English, is the first train station on the Sagano Scenic Line, a sightseeing train that follows the picturesque Hozukyo Ravine near the JR West Sagano Line. It is located in Kamigyo-ku, Kyoto, Japan.

== Station layout ==
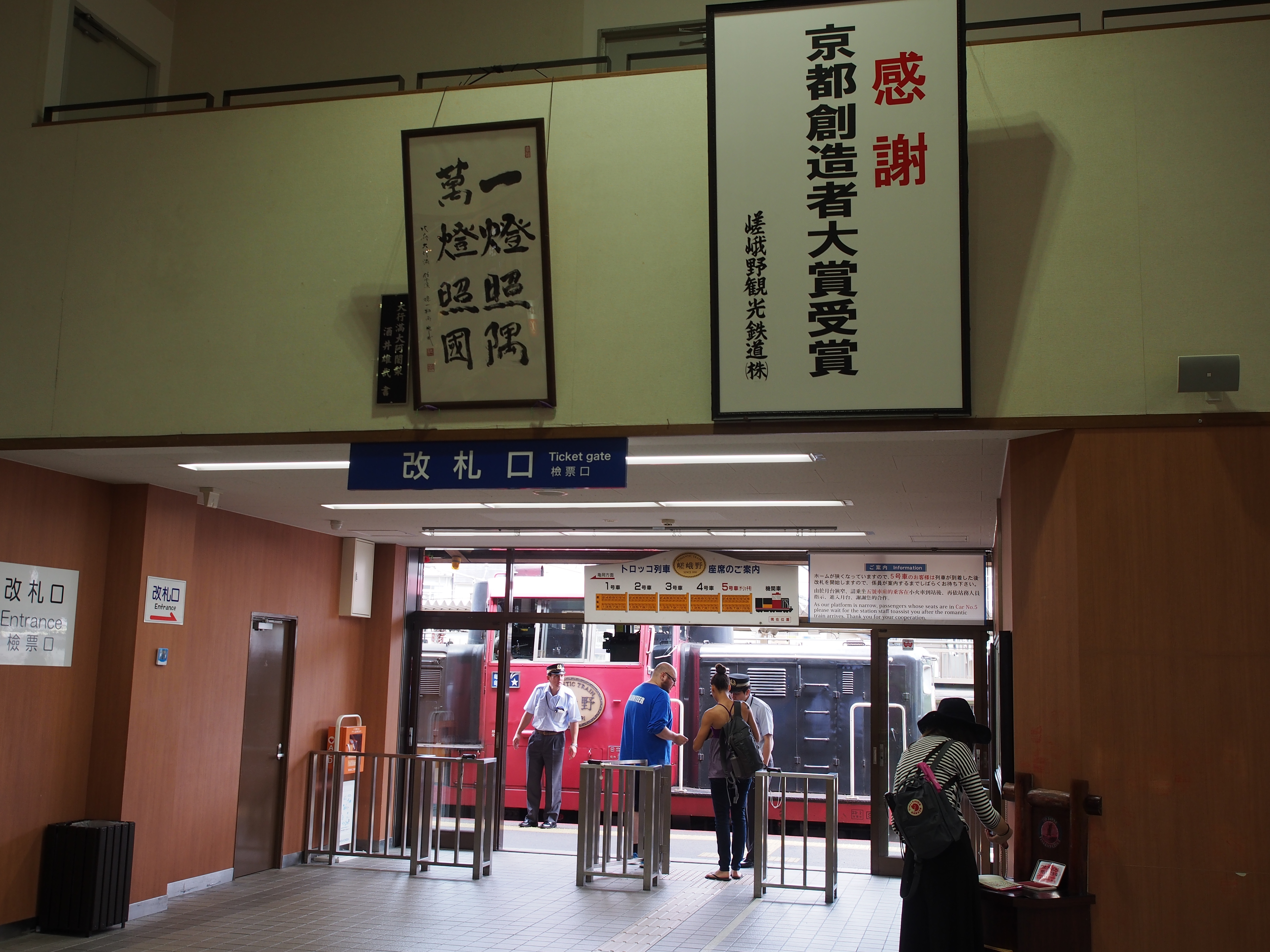
Looking towards the platform

The station consists of a single ground-level platform servicing trains to Torokko Kameoka. It is wheelchair-accessible.

The building includes a concourse, rest area, café, and bike rentals. The Diorama Kyoto Japan contains one of Japan's biggest HO scale model train collections, and a large diorama of Kyoto's historic sites and neighbourhoods.

Several preserved Japanese steam locomotives are also on static display in the 19th Century Hall and by the main entrance, including:

- JNR Class C58 48
- JNR Class D51 51 (demolished in 2019 due to aging)
- JNR Class C56 98

== Adjacent stations ==
Map

The JR West Saga-Arashiyama Station is located in the adjacent building and provides services to Kyoto, Kameoka, Sonobe, and Fukuchiyama. The Arashiyama Line Randen-Saga station is a block away, and provides services to Arashiyama and Shijō-Ōmiya.

«	Service	»
Sagano Scenic Line
Terminus	Local	Torokko Arashiyama
