= Sagano Line =

Railway line in Kyoto prefecture, Japan

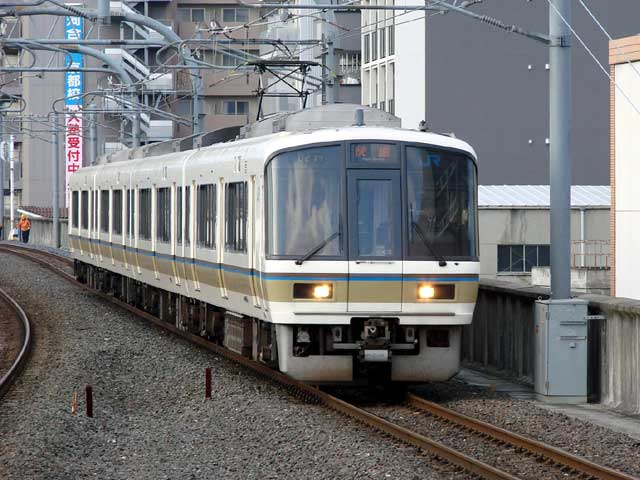
- 221 series on a local service

Overview
- Native name: 嵯峨野線
- Locale: Kyoto Prefecture
- Termini: Kyoto; Sonobe

Service
- Type: Heavy rail
- System: Urban Network
- Operator(s): JR West

History
- Opened: 15 February 1897; 129 years ago (San'in Main Line); 13 March 1988; 38 years ago (Sagano Line name becomes first used)

Technical
- Line length: 34.2 km (21.3 mi)
- Track gauge: 1,067 mm (3 ft 6 in)
- Electrification: 1,500 V DC (overhead lines)
- Operating speed: 120 km/h (75 mph)

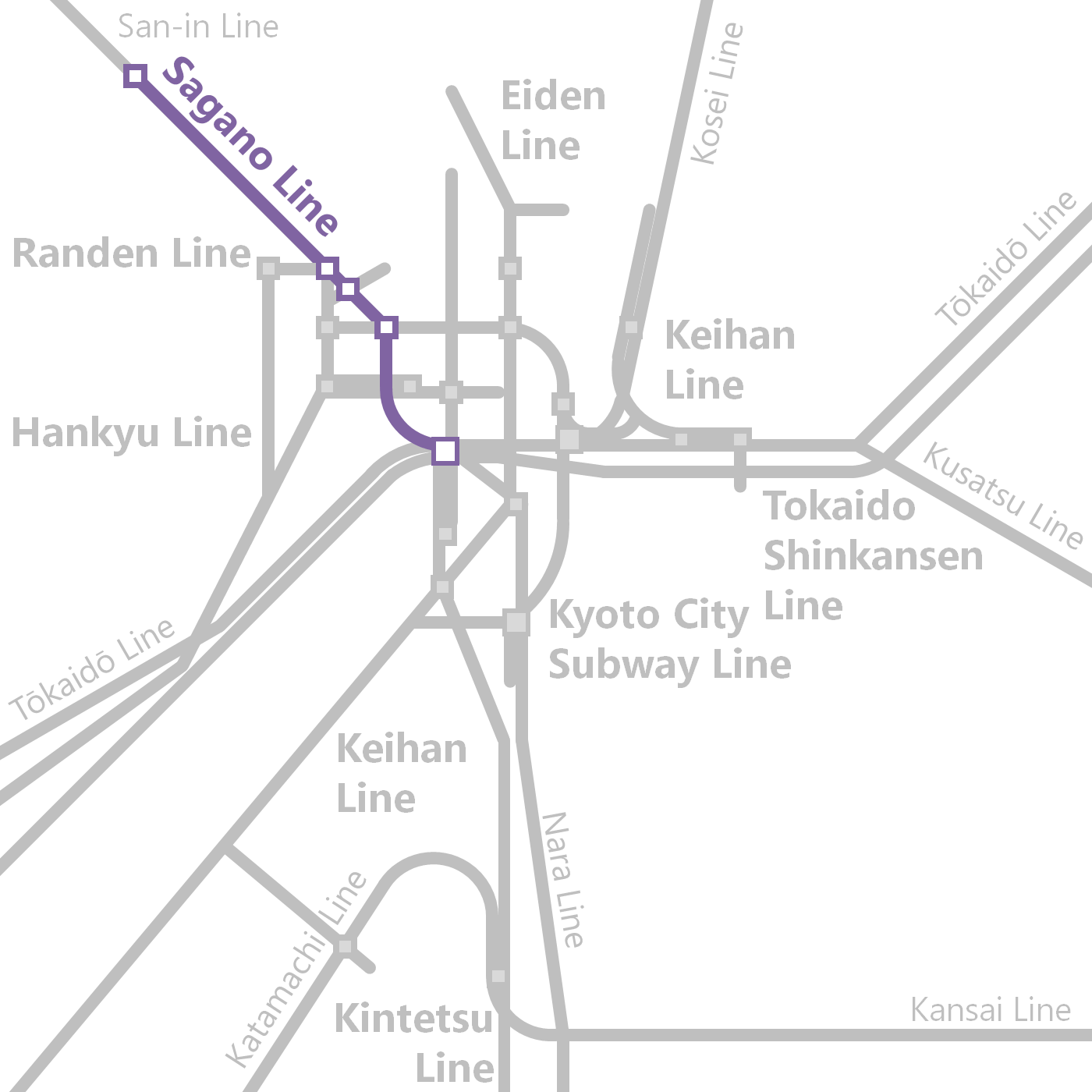
Railway map around Sagano line

The Sagano Line (嵯峨野線, Sagano-sen) is the popular name for a portion of the San'in Main Line in the suburbs of Kyoto, Japan. The electrified and double-tracked railway is a commuter rail line in the Keihanshin (Kyoto–Osaka–Kobe) metropolitan area, and is owned and operated by West Japan Railway Company (JR West). The line starts at Kyoto Station and ends at Sonobe Station.

The Sagano Line forms part of JR West's "Urban Network". This name has been in official use since 1988.

== Sagano Scenic Railway ==
The Sagano Scenic Railway (嵯峨野観光鉄道, Sagano Kankō Tetsudō) is a sightseeing railway that uses an abandoned section of the San'in Main Line originally built in 1897. In 1989, the San'in Main Line was rerouted between the present day Saga-Arashiyama Station to Umahori to accommodate track duplication and electrification. However the old route, which ran along the Hozu River, had been popular with tourists. The Sagano Scenic Railway, a subsidiary of JR West developed jointly with the city of Kameoka, was founded, and the Sagano Scenic Line began operation in 1991.

The track and stations were all formerly used by the San'in Main Line and are still owned by JR West, while trains are composed of former JR West Class DE10 diesel locomotives and torokko open-sided cars (derived from the English "truck") converted from former freight gondola cars.

The Sagano Scenic Line stations are as follows (corresponding JR Sagano Line stations in parentheses):

Torokko Saga (Saga-Arashiyama) - Torokko Arashiyama - Torokko Hozukyo (Hozukyō) - Torokko Kameoka (Umahori)

== Stations ==
- All stations on the Sagano Line are located in Kyoto Prefecture
- Rapid services stop at Kyoto, Nijo, Emmachi, Saga-Arashiyama, and every station from Kameoka to Sonobe.
- Limited Express services stop at Kyoto, Nijo, Kameoka and Sonobe on this section of the San'in Line.

No.	Station	Japanese	Distance (km)	Rapid	Connections	Location
San'in Main Line
JR-E01	Kyoto	京都	0.0	●	Tōkaidō Shinkansen; JR Kyoto Line (JR-A31); Biwako Line (JR-A31); Kosei Line (JR-B31); Nara Line (JR-D01); B Kintetsu Kyoto Line (B01); Kyoto Municipal Subway Karasuma Line (K11)	Shimogyo-ku, Kyoto
JR-E02	Umekōji-Kyōtonishi	梅小路京都西	1.7	|		Shimogyo-ku, Kyoto
JR-E03	Tambaguchi	丹波口	2.5	|		Shimogyo-ku, Kyoto
JR-E04	Nijo	二条	4.2	●	Kyoto Municipal Subway Tozai Line (T15)	Nakagyo-ku, Kyoto
JR-E05	Emmachi	円町	5.8	●		Nakagyo-ku, Kyoto
JR-E06	Hanazono	花園	6.9	|		Ukyo-ku, Kyoto
JR-E07	Uzumasa	太秦	8.6	|	Randen Arashiyama Main Line (A8: Katabiranotsuji); Randen Kitano Line (A8: Katabiranotsuji)	Ukyo-ku, Kyoto
JR-E08	Saga-Arashiyama	嵯峨嵐山	10.3	●	Sagano Scenic Railway (Torokko Saga); Randen Arashiyama Main Line (A12: Randen-Saga)	Ukyo-ku, Kyoto
JR-E09	Hozukyo	保津峡	14.3	|		Kameoka
JR-E10	Umahori	馬堀	18.1	|	Sagano Scenic Railway (Torokko Kameoka)	Kameoka
JR-E11	Kameoka	亀岡	20.2	●		Kameoka
JR-E12	Namikawa	並河	23.4	●		Kameoka
JR-E13	Chiyokawa	千代川	25.2	●		Kameoka
JR-E14	Yagi	八木	28.2	●		Nantan
JR-E15	Yoshitomi	吉富	32.2	●		Nantan
JR-E16	Sonobe	園部	34.2	●		Nantan
Continuing service on the San'in Main Line to Fukuchiyama and beyond
