= Sagano Scenic Railway =

Railway line in Japan

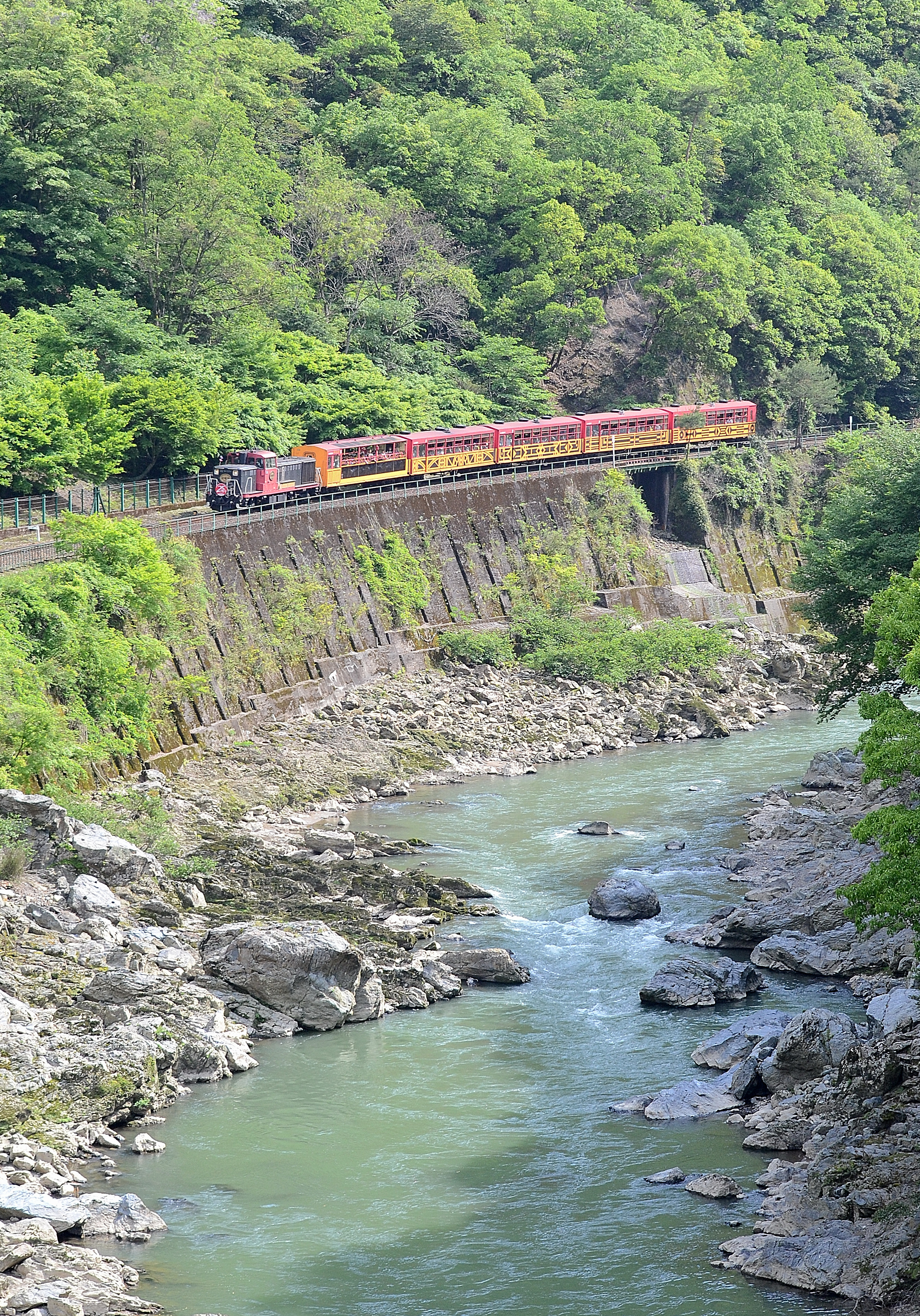
- The line viewed from Torokko Hozukyō Station in May 2016

Overview
- Native name: 嵯峨野観光鉄道
- Status: Operational
- Locale: Kyoto
- Termini: Torokko Saga; Torokko Kameoka
- Stations: 4

Technical
- Line length: 7.3 km (4.5 mi)
- Track gauge: 1,067 mm (3 ft 6 in)
- Electrification: None

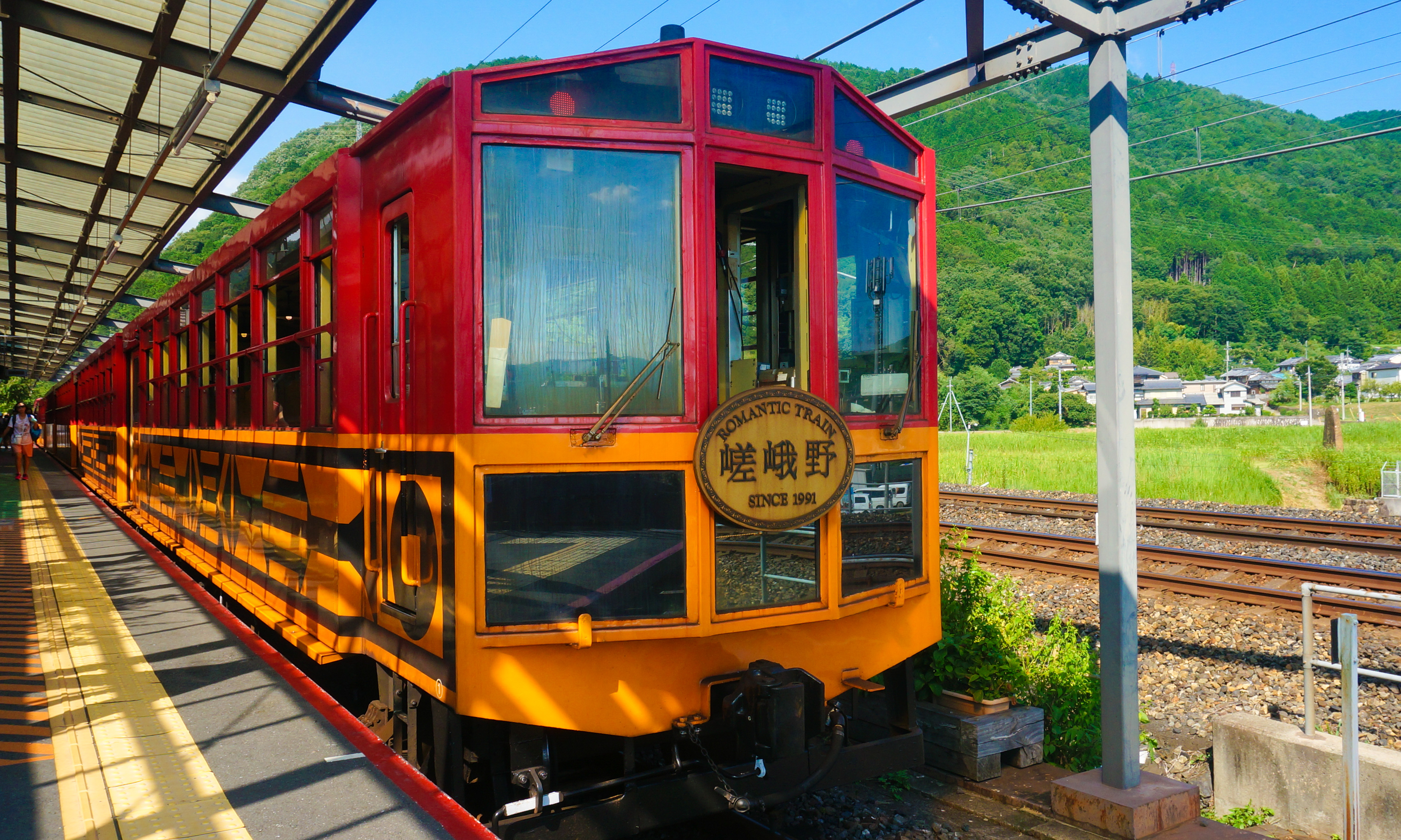
The train of this line

Sagano Scenic Railway outside and inside a train, 2017

The Sagano Scenic Railway (嵯峨野観光鉄道, Sagano Kankō Tetsudō) or Sagano Sightseeing Railway is a wholly owned subsidiary of West Japan Railway Company (JR West) that operates the Sagano Scenic Line (嵯峨野観光線, Sagano Kankō-sen), Sagano Sight-seeing Line, or Sagano Romantic Train (嵯峨野トロッコ列車, Sagano Torokko Ressha, Lit."'Sagano Minecart Train"') in Kyoto.

The line uses superseded tracks of the Sagano Line (officially a portion of the San'in Main Line) of JR West, from Torokko Saga in Arashiyama, and passes a gorge offering a scenic view along the Hozu River, then enters and terminates in the basin of Kameoka. It is closed on Wednesdays and in the winter.

The line is locally known as "Torokko in Hozu gorge". Torokko is a Japanese word derived from the English "truck" once used for mining cars hauling ore, but presently means rail carriages basic accommodation and open sides.

== Description ==
=== Company ===
- Wholly owned subsidiary of West Japan Railway Company
- Headquarters: Ukyō-ku, Kyoto, Kyoto Prefecture, Japan
- Founded: 1990
- Major enterprise: Operation of Sagano Scenic Line

=== Line ===
- Under Railway Business Act (not under Tram Act)
- Operation and possession (see Three categories of railway)
  - Operation: Sagano Scenic Railway (category 2)
  - Possession: West Japan Railway (category 1)
- Track: single
  - Shares down (for Kameoka) track of Sanin Main Line between Torokko Saga and Torokko Arashiyama stations. Up trains of the line traverse the down line to reach Arashiyama.
- Traction: internal combustion (diesel)
- No. of stations: 4 including both ends
- Rolling stock
  - Locomotive: 1
  - Coaches: 5

== History ==
=== Construction of the line ===
The line was originally a part of the main line of the Kyoto Railway (京都鉄道, Kyōto Tetsudō) opened in 1899, to connect Kyoto to the northern part of Kyoto Prefecture, or the old province of Tanba. The company adopted the relatively level route through the gorge, avoiding Oinosaka (老の坂) pass which would have required a steep grade. The company was nationalized in 1907. The line became a part of the San'in Main Line.

=== Bypass ===
JR West, succeeding the Japanese National Railways (JNR), built a new, shorter, straighter, electrified double-tracked section of the Sanin Main Line between Saga (present Saga-Arashiyama) and Umahori which opened in 1989, bypassing the original winding route with narrow tunnels.

=== Success ===
JR West utilised the original line for tourism under a subsidiary founded in 1990. JR West used old rolling stock for this purpose; four semi-open coaches hauled by a diesel locomotive.

By 1991, the line was more popular than expected (there had been speculation that the venture would be unsuccessful). As a result, a fifth carriage, nicknamed "The Rich" (ザ・リッチ), was introduced. The car is contrary to its name, converted from an old gondola of JR West to fully open carriage, even the floor and the sides are of fine grills and offers a rough ride.

Combined with rafting on the Hozu River, it is a major tourist attraction in Arashiyama and Sagano.

== Operation ==
All trains are operated between Torokko Saga and Torokko Kameoka stations. All seats are reserved, and tickets (JPY 880 for adult and JPY 310 for child, as of 2023) are on sale one month prior to the operation with some exceptions. Some are sold on the day, but travel in "The Rich" is not available on rainy days. Down (for Kameoka) trains cater for a return journey via the Hozu River boat ride to Arashiyama, thus up trains are generally less patronised.

== Stations ==
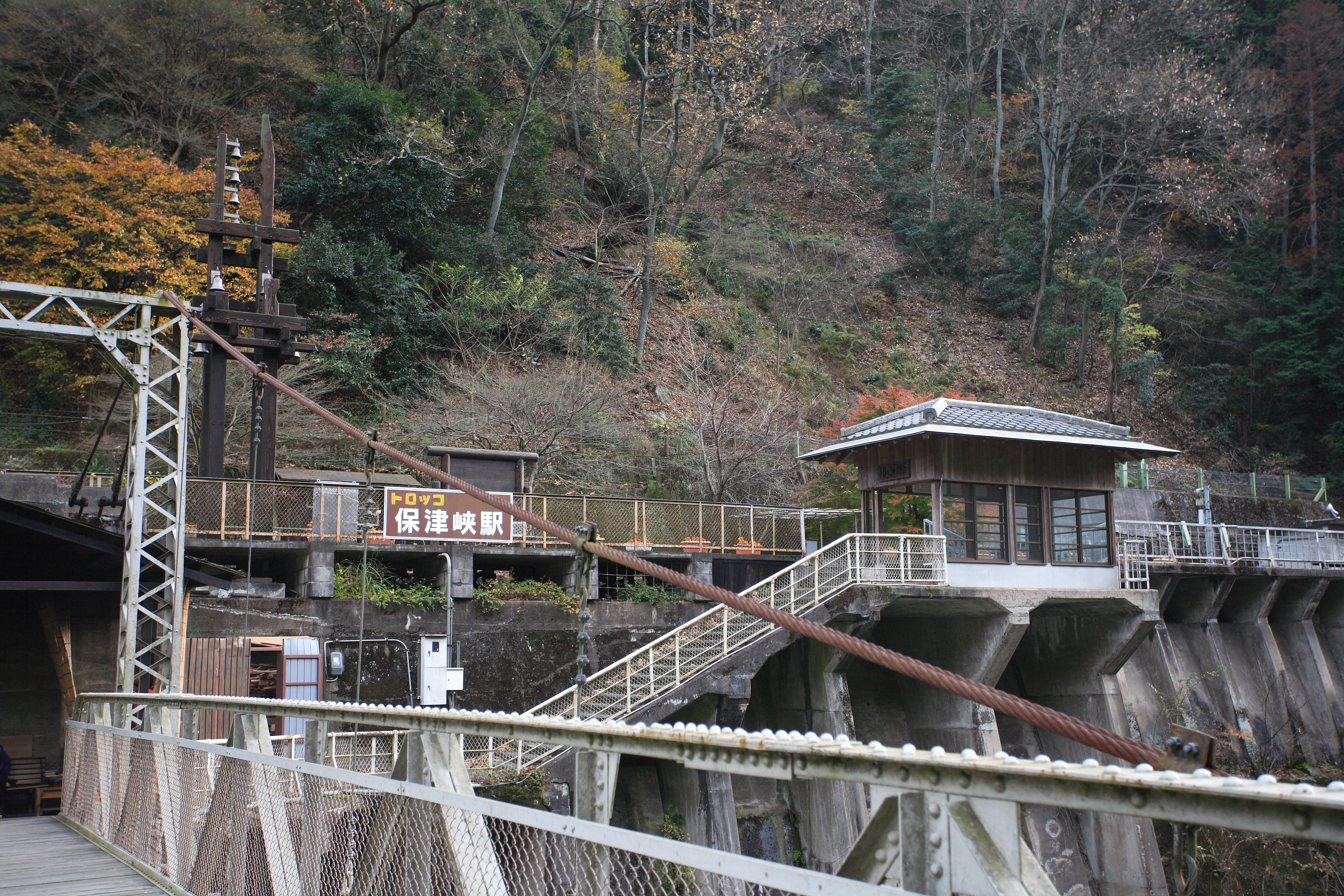
Hozukyo station

All stations are in Kyoto City, except for Torokko Kameoka station, which is in Kameoka City.

- Torokko Saga (トロッコ嵯峨)
  - Newly built next to the Saga Station of the San'in Main Line as the Kyoto terminus
- Torokko Arashiyama (トロッコ嵐山)
  - Newly built next to the eastern opening of a tunnel entering to the gorge. Accessible from Arashiyama of Keifuku Electric Railroad Arashiyama Main Line via a bamboo grove stroll
- Torokko Hozukyō (トロッコ保津峡)
  - Continued to use the old station on the abandoned line after slight refurbishment. Accessible from Hozukyō on the main line via a detour
- Torokko Kameoka (トロッコ亀岡)
  - Newly built on the abandoned line as the Kameoka terminus
  - Accessible on foot from Umahori on the San'in Main Line, by bus to the pier for Hozu River rafting

== Rolling stock ==
As mentioned above, all are JR West origin. Daily and minor maintenance is carried out at Torokko Saga, while heavy maintenances in JR West facility.

Liveried in red, yellow and black, explained as a typical colour set to infer Kyoto.

- Locomotive
  - JNR Class DE10 diesel locomotive, No. DE10 1104
  - Heading on Saga end of the formation
- Passenger cars, from Saga side to Kameoka
  - SK300-1, SK100-1, SK100-11, SK100-2, SK200-1
  - All were converted from Toki 25000 type gondolas (trucks)
  - SK200-1 is equipped with controller on the Kameoka end
  - SK300-1 is nicknamed "The Rich", floor and side are of fine grills

== See also ==
- List of railway lines in Japan
