= Torokko Kameoka Station =

Railway station in Kameoka, Kyoto Prefecture, Japan

Torokko Kameoka Station: トロッコ亀岡駅; とろっこかめおか
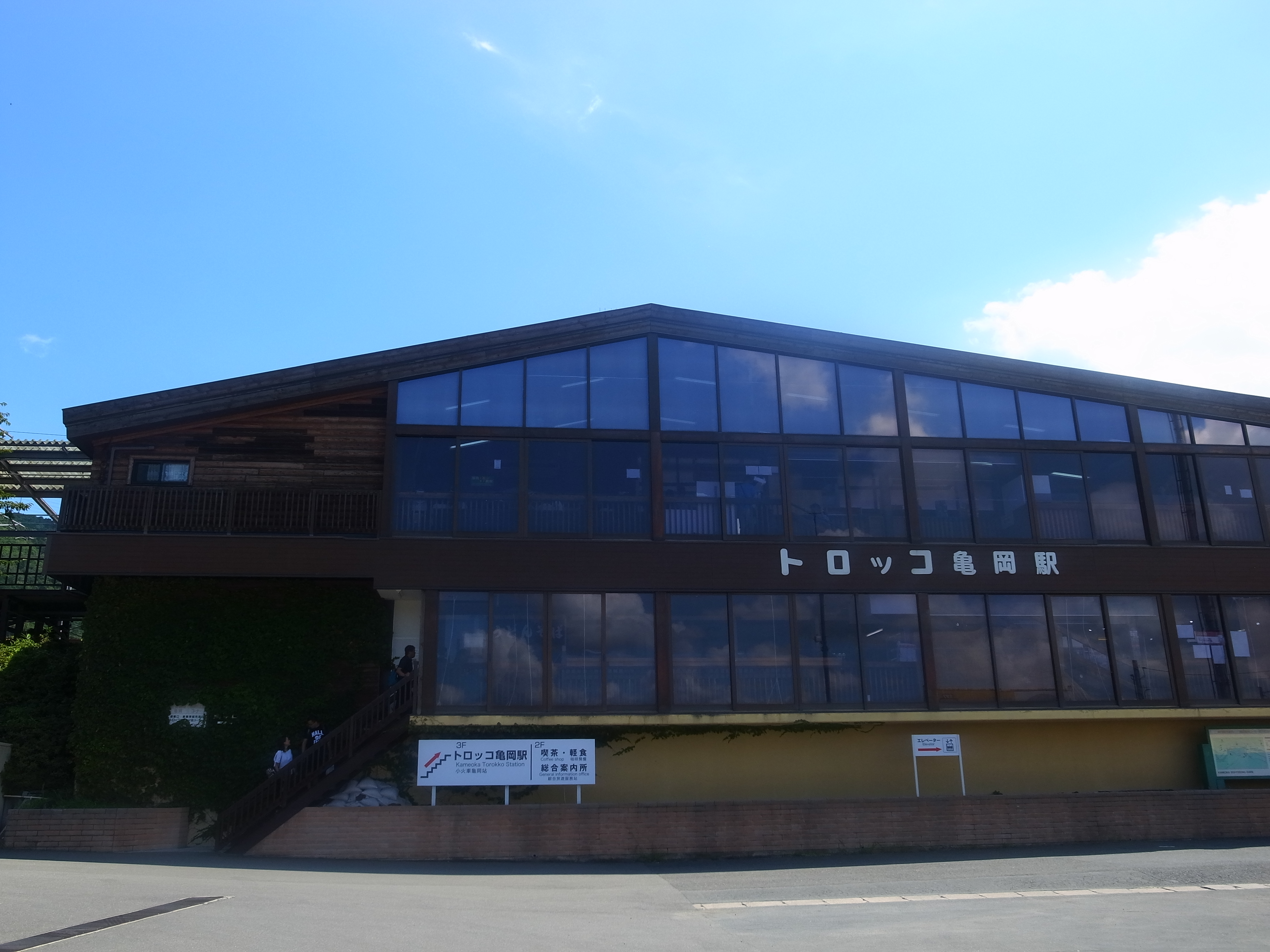
- Station building in 2017

General information
- Location: Yamamoto, Shinomachi, Kameoka City; Kyoto Prefecture; Japan
- Coordinates: 35.0129724°N 135.6068303°E
- Owner: JR West
- Operator: Sagano Sightseeing Railway
- Line: Sagano Scenic Line
- Distance: 7.3 km (4.5 mi) from Torokko Saga
- Platforms: 1 side platform
- Tracks: 1

Construction
- Structure type: At-grade

Other information
- Website: Official website (in Japanese)

History
- Opened: 27 April 1991; 35 years ago

Passengers
- FY 2023: 929 daily
Location
- Location within Kyoto Prefecture Location within Kansai region Location within Japan

Torokko Kameoka Station (トロッコ亀岡駅, Torokko Kameoka-eki) is the fourth and final train station on the Sagano Scenic Line, a sightseeing train that follows the picturesque Hozukyo Ravine of the old JR West Sagano Line. It is located in Kameoka, Kyoto, Japan.

== Station layout ==
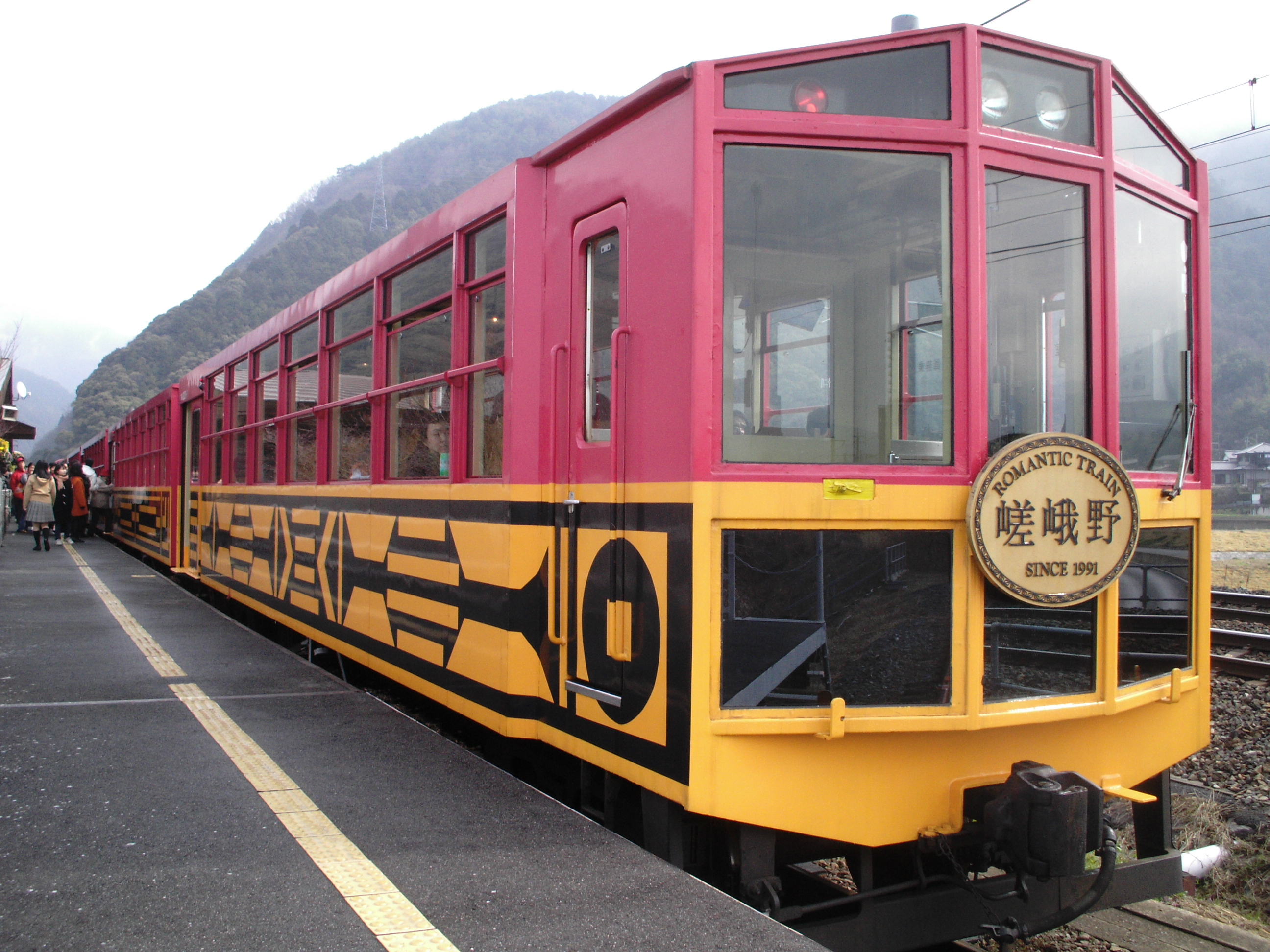
Scenic train at the station

The station consists of a single ground-level platform servicing trains to Torokko Saga.

== Adjacent stations ==
«	Service	»
Sagano Scenic Line
Torokko Hozukyō	Local	Terminus
