= Imadegawa Street =

Street in Kyoto city, Japan

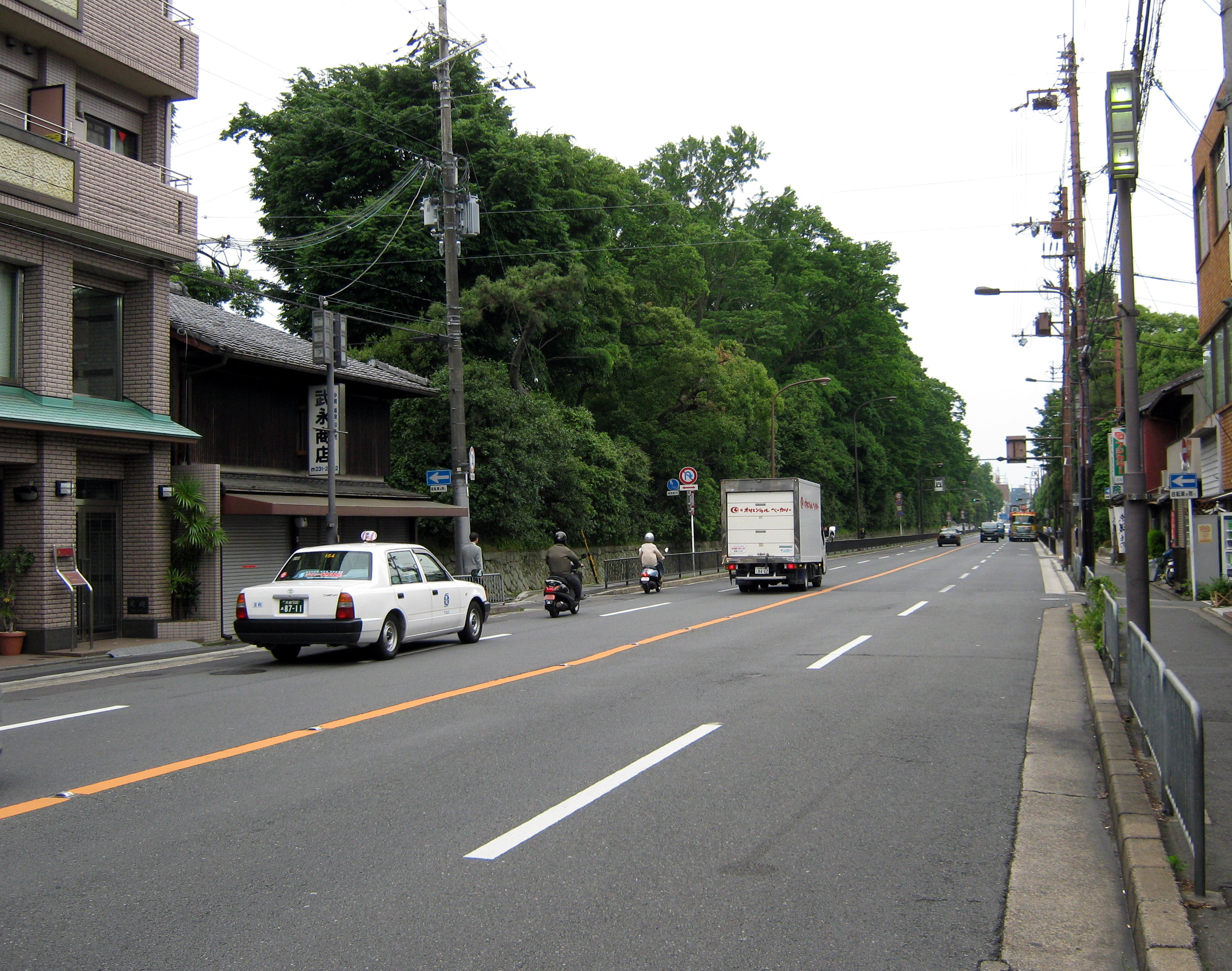
Imadegawa Street, looking west near the intersection with Teramachi.

Imadegawa Street (今出川通 いまでがわどおり Imadegawa Dōri) is a major street that crosses the city of Kyoto from east to west, running approximately 7 km from the gate of the Ginkaku-ji (east end) to the vicinity of the railway crossing west of the Tōjiin Ritsumeikan University Station (west end).

== History ==
Present day Imadegawa Street corresponds to the Kitakōji Street of the middle ages. The name of the street originates from the now non-existent Imadegawa River that used to run on the north side of the street until 1917.

== Current status ==
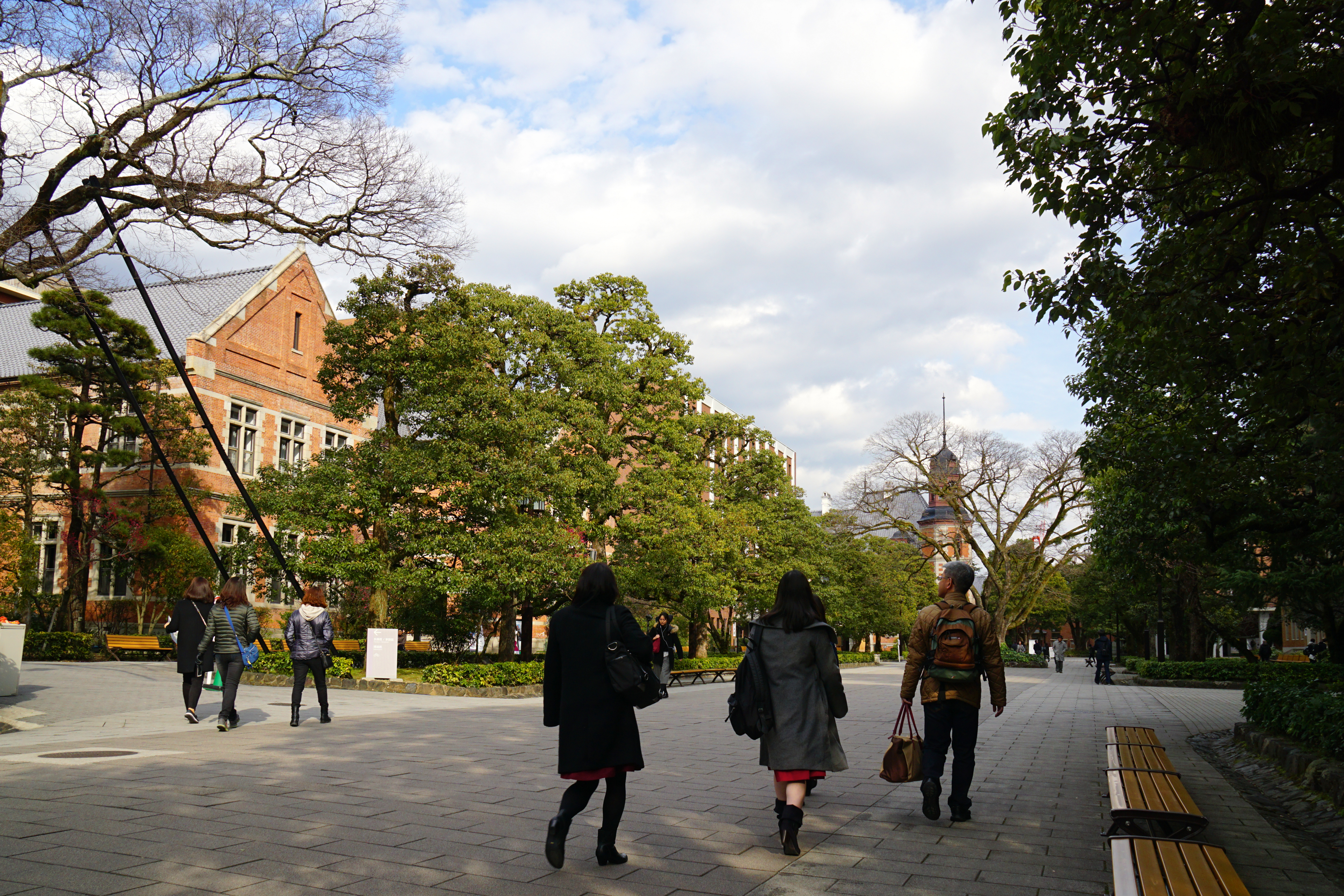
Doshisha University Imadegawa Campus.

Imadegawa Street is now located between Itsutsuji Street to the north and Motoseiganji Street to the south, and is considered narrow for a major road. The street passes on the north side of the Kyoto Imperial Palace and for this reason, the northern gate of the garden receives the name of Imadegawa Gomon. Several universities are located along the street and for this reason its east section is considered a student district.

== Relevant landmarks ==
The following landmark can be found along Imadegawa Street:

- Ginkaku-ji
- Jōdo-in
- Lake Biwa Canal
- Shirakawa River
- Yoshida Mountain
- Kyoto University
- Takano River
- Kamo River
- Kamo Ohashi Bridge
- Kyoto Imperial Palace
- Doshisha University
- Kyoto City Kamigyō Ward Office
- Nishijin Textile Center
- Kyoto City Archeological Museum
- Kamishichiken
- Kitano Tenmangū

=== Train Stations ===
==== Subway ====
- Imadegawa Station

==== Keifuku Electric Railroad ====
- Kitano-Hakubaichō Station
- Tōjiin Ritsumeikan University Station
