= Satsueisho-mae Station =

Tram station in Kyoto, Japan

Satsueisho-mae Station: 撮影所前駅; さつえいしょまえ
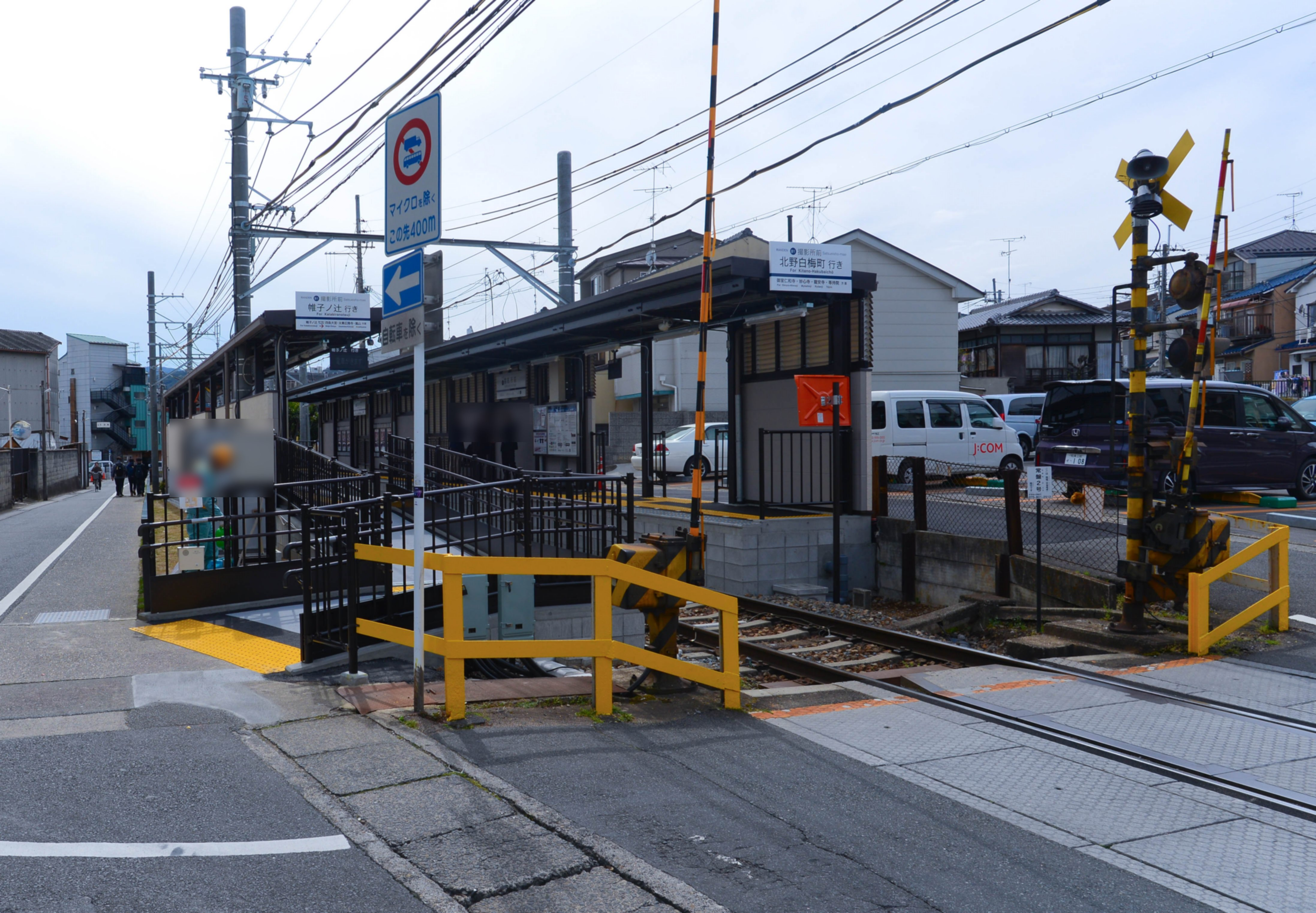
- Station platforms, 2016

General information
- Location: Ukyo-ku, Kyoto; Kyoto Prefecture; Japan
- Coordinates: 35.0158478°N 135.7029010°E
- Operator: Keifuku Electric Railroad
- Line: Randen Arashiyama Line
- Distance: 3.5km from Kitano-Hakubaichō
- Platforms: 2
- Tracks: 1
- Connections: JR West Sagano Line (Uzumasa Station)

Construction
- Structure type: At-grade

Other information
- Station code: B1
- Website: Official (in Japanese)

History
- Opened: April 1, 2016
Location

Satsueisho-mae Station (撮影所前駅, Satsueisho-mae-eki) is a tram stop in Ukyo-ku, Kyoto, Japan. The station is serviced by the Randen Kitano Line that begins at Katabiranotsuji and continues to Kitano-Hakubaichō.

== Station layout ==
The station consists of two platforms at ground level services by a single track. Platform 1 services trams to Katabiranotsuji, connecting with the Randen Arashiyama Line. Platform 2 services trams bound for Kitano-Hakubaichō.

== Adjacent stations ==
| « | Service | » |
Randen Kitano Line
| Katabiranotsuji (A8) | Local | Tokiwa (B2) |
