= Randen-Tenjingawa Station =

Tram station in Kyoto, Japan

Randen-Tenjingawa Station: 嵐電天神川駅; らんでんてんじんがわ
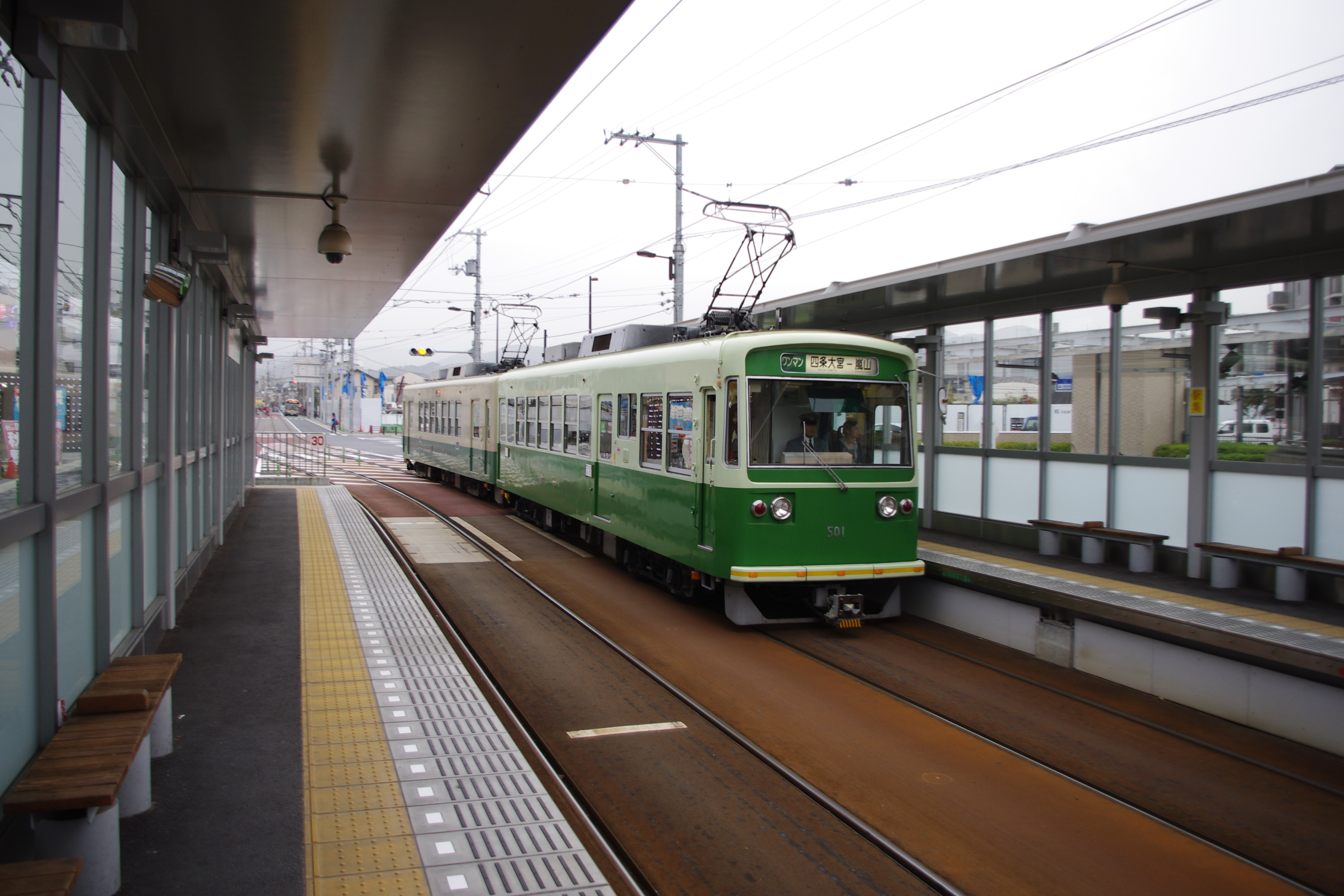
- Station platforms, 2010

General information
- Location: Ukyo-ku, Kyoto; Kyoto Prefecture; Japan
- Coordinates: 35.0102352°N 135.7150576°E
- Operator: Keifuku Electric Railroad
- Line: Randen Arashiyama Line
- Distance: 2.8 km (1.7 mi) from Shijō-Ōmiya
- Platforms: 2
- Tracks: 2
- Connections: Kyoto Municipal Subway Tōzai Line (T17: Uzumasa Tenjingawa)

Construction
- Structure type: At-grade

Other information
- Station code: A5
- Website: Official (in Japanese)

History
- Opened: March 28, 2008

Passengers
- FY2015: 1.7 million
Location

Randen-Tenjingawa Station (嵐電天神川駅, Randen-Tenjingawa-eki) is a tram stop in Ukyo-ku, Kyoto, Japan. The station is serviced by the Randen Arashiyama Line that begins at Shijō-Ōmiya and continues west to Arashiyama.

== Station layout ==
The station consists of two ramp-accessible platforms at ground level. Platform 1 services trams to Arashiyama, platform 2 for Shijō-Ōmiya.

== Adjacent stations ==
«	Service	»
Randen Arashiyama Line
Yamanouchi (A4)	Local	Kaikonoyashiro (A6)
