= Narutaki Station =

Tram station in Kyoto, Japan

Narutaki Station: 鳴滝駅; なるたき
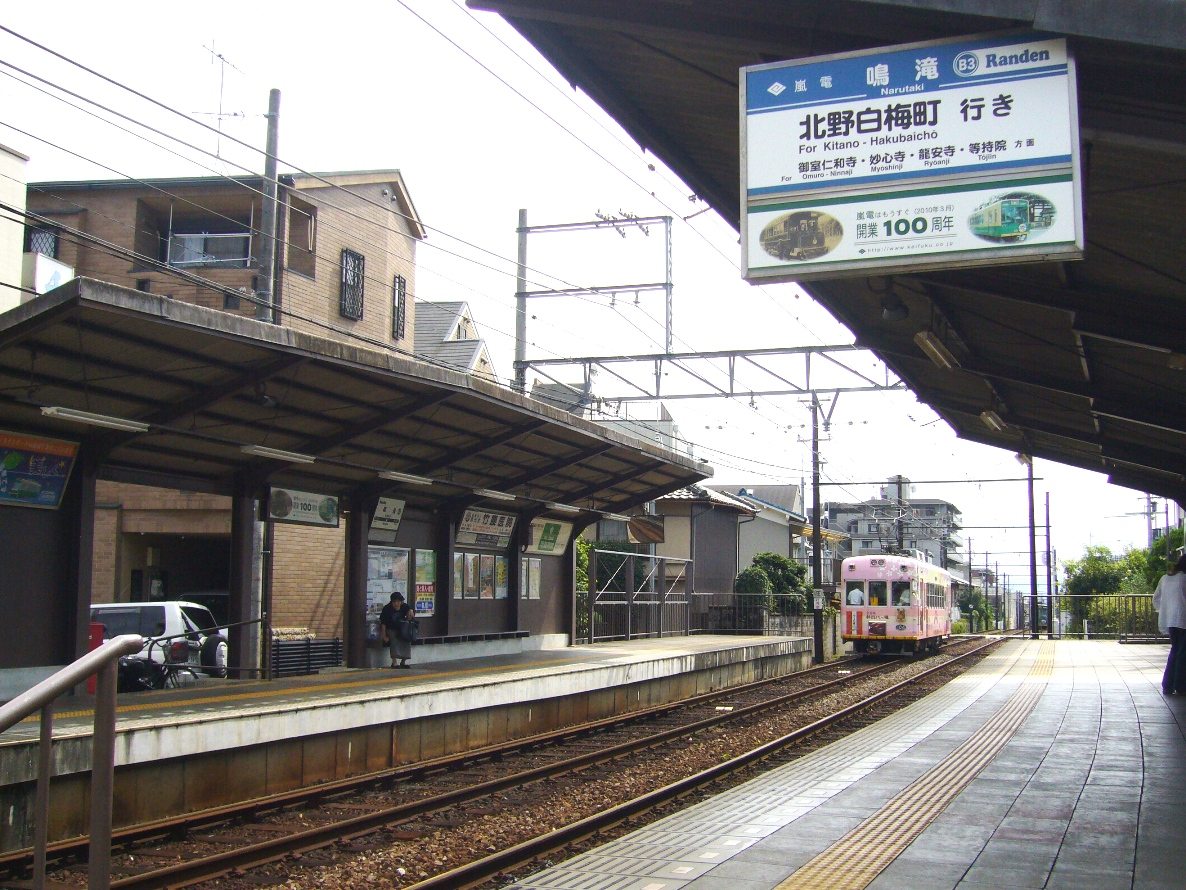
- Station platforms, 2007

General information
- Location: Ukyo-ku, Kyoto; Kyoto Prefecture; Japan
- Coordinates: 35.0236370°N 135.7057831°E
- Operator: Keifuku Electric Railroad
- Line: Randen Arashiyama Line
- Distance: 2.6km from Kitano-Hakubaichō
- Platforms: 2
- Tracks: 2

Construction
- Structure type: At-grade

Other information
- Station code: B3
- Website: Official (in Japanese)

History
- Opened: March 10, 1926

Passengers
- FY2015: 0.3 million
Location

Narutaki Station (鳴滝駅, Narutaki-eki) is a tram stop in Ukyo-ku, Kyoto, Japan. The station is serviced by the Randen Kitano Line that begins at Katabiranotsuji and continues to Kitano-Hakubaichō.

== Station layout ==
The station consists of two platforms at ground level. Platform 1 services trams to Katabiranotsuji, connecting with the Randen Arashiyama Line. Platform 2 services trams bound for Kitano-Hakubaichō.

== Adjacent stations ==
«	Service	»
Randen Kitano Line
Tokiwa (B2)	Local	Utano (B5)
