= Ryōanji station =

Tram station in Kyoto, Japan

Ryōanji Station: 龍安寺駅; りょうあんじ
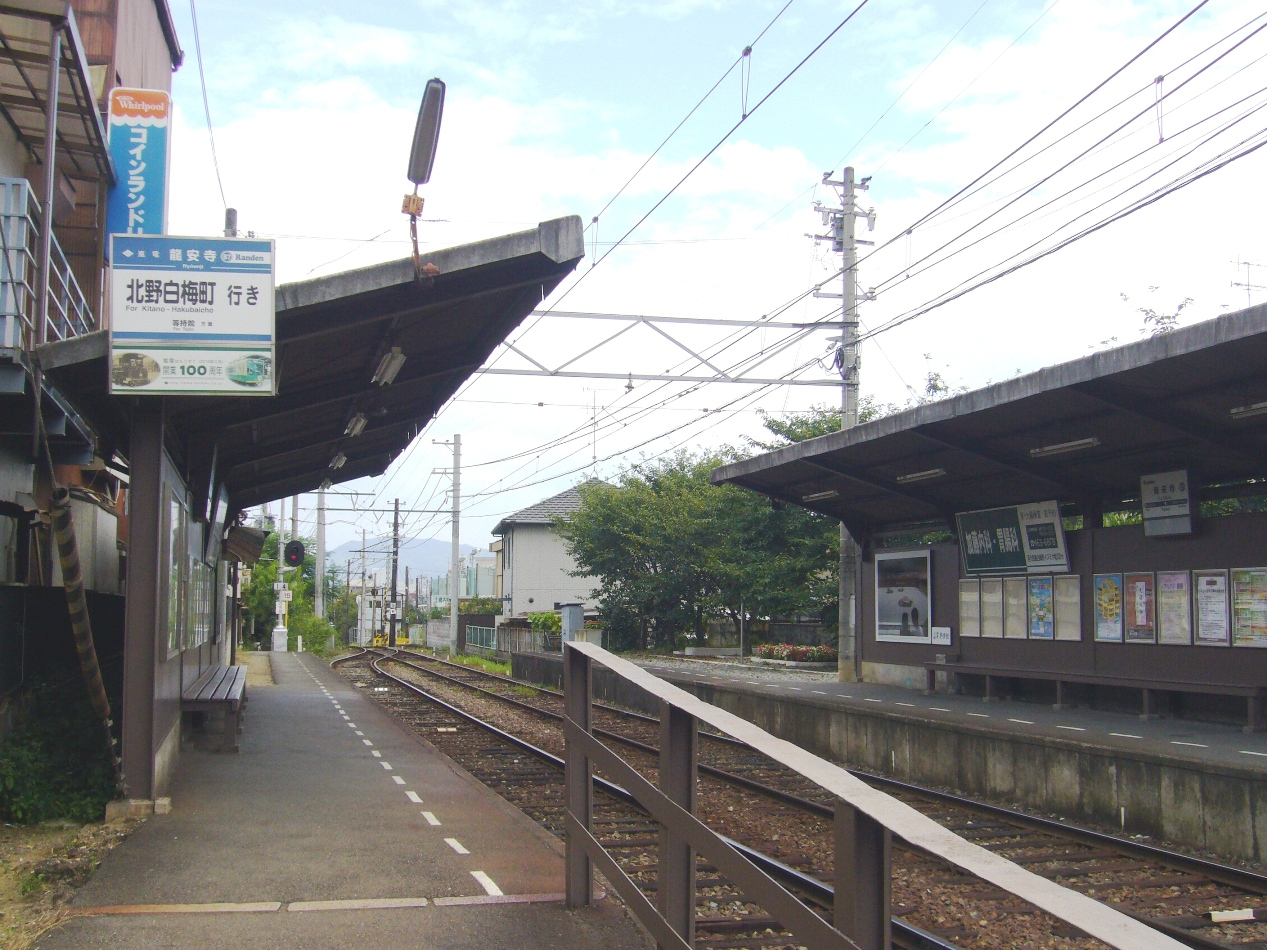
- Station platforms, 2007

General information
- Location: Kita-ku, Kyoto; Kyoto Prefecture; Japan
- Coordinates: 35°1′40.22″N 135°43′16.08″E
- Operator: Keifuku Electric Railroad
- Line: Randen Arashiyama Line
- Distance: 0.9km from Kitano-Hakubaichō
- Platforms: 2
- Tracks: 2

Construction
- Structure type: At-grade

Other information
- Station code: B7
- Website: Official (in Japanese)

History
- Opened: November 3, 1925

Passengers
- FY2015: 0.4 million
Location

Ryōanji station (龍安寺駅, Ryōanji-eki) is a tram stop in Ukyo-ku, Kyoto, Japan. The station is serviced by the Randen Kitano Line that begins at Katabiranotsuji and continues to Kitano-Hakubaichō.

== Station layout ==
The station consists of two platforms at ground level. Platform 1 services trams to Katabiranotsuji, connecting with the Randen Arashiyama Line. Platform 2 services trams bound for Kitano-Hakubaichō.

== Adjacent stations ==
«	Service	»
Randen Kitano Line
Myōshinji (B6)	Local	Tōjiin Ritsumeikan University (B8)
