= Rokuōin Station =

Tram station in Kyoto, Japan

Rokuōin Station: 鹿王院駅; ろくおういん
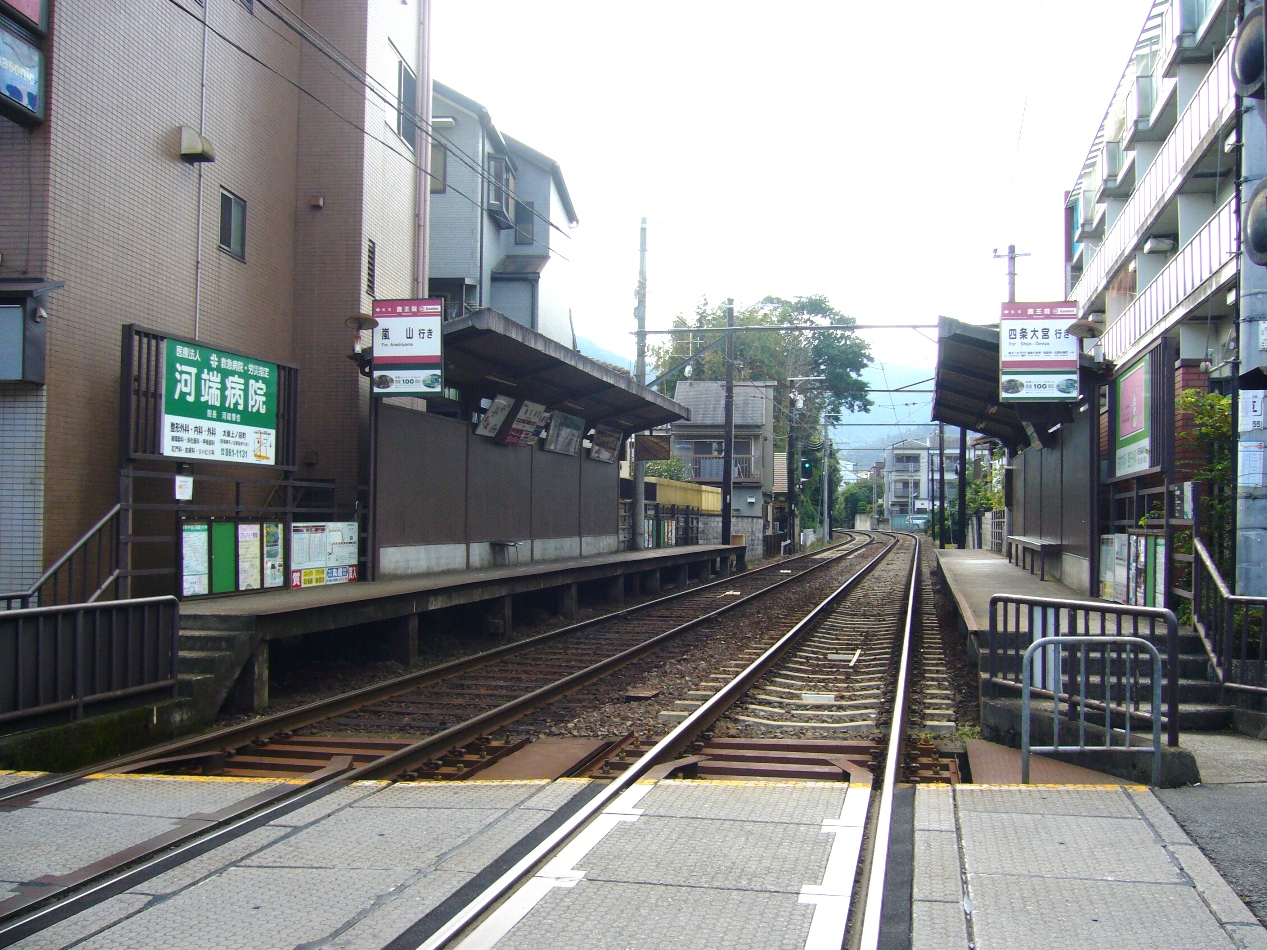
- Station platforms, 2007

General information
- Location: Ukyo-ku, Kyoto; Kyoto Prefecture; Japan
- Coordinates: 35.0170046°N 135.6856844°E
- Operator: Keifuku Electric Railroad
- Line: Randen Arashiyama Line
- Distance: 6.5km from Shijō-Ōmiya
- Platforms: 2
- Tracks: 2

Construction
- Structure type: At-grade

Other information
- Station code: A11
- Website: Official (in Japanese)

History
- Opened: November 27, 1956

Passengers
- FY2015: 0.4 million
Location

Rokuōin Station (鹿王院駅, Rokuōin-eki) is a tram stop in Ukyo-ku, Kyoto, Japan. The station is serviced by the Randen Arashiyama Line that begins at Shijō-Ōmiya and continues west to Arashiyama.

== Station layout ==
The station consists of two platforms at ground level. Platform 1 services trams to Arashiyama, platform 2 for Shijō-Ōmiya.

== Adjacent stations ==
«	Service	»
Randen Arashiyama Line
Kurumazaki-Jinja (A10)	Local	Randen-Saga (A12)
