= Arisugawa Station =

Tram station in Kyoto, Japan

Arisugawa Station: 有栖川駅; ありすがわ
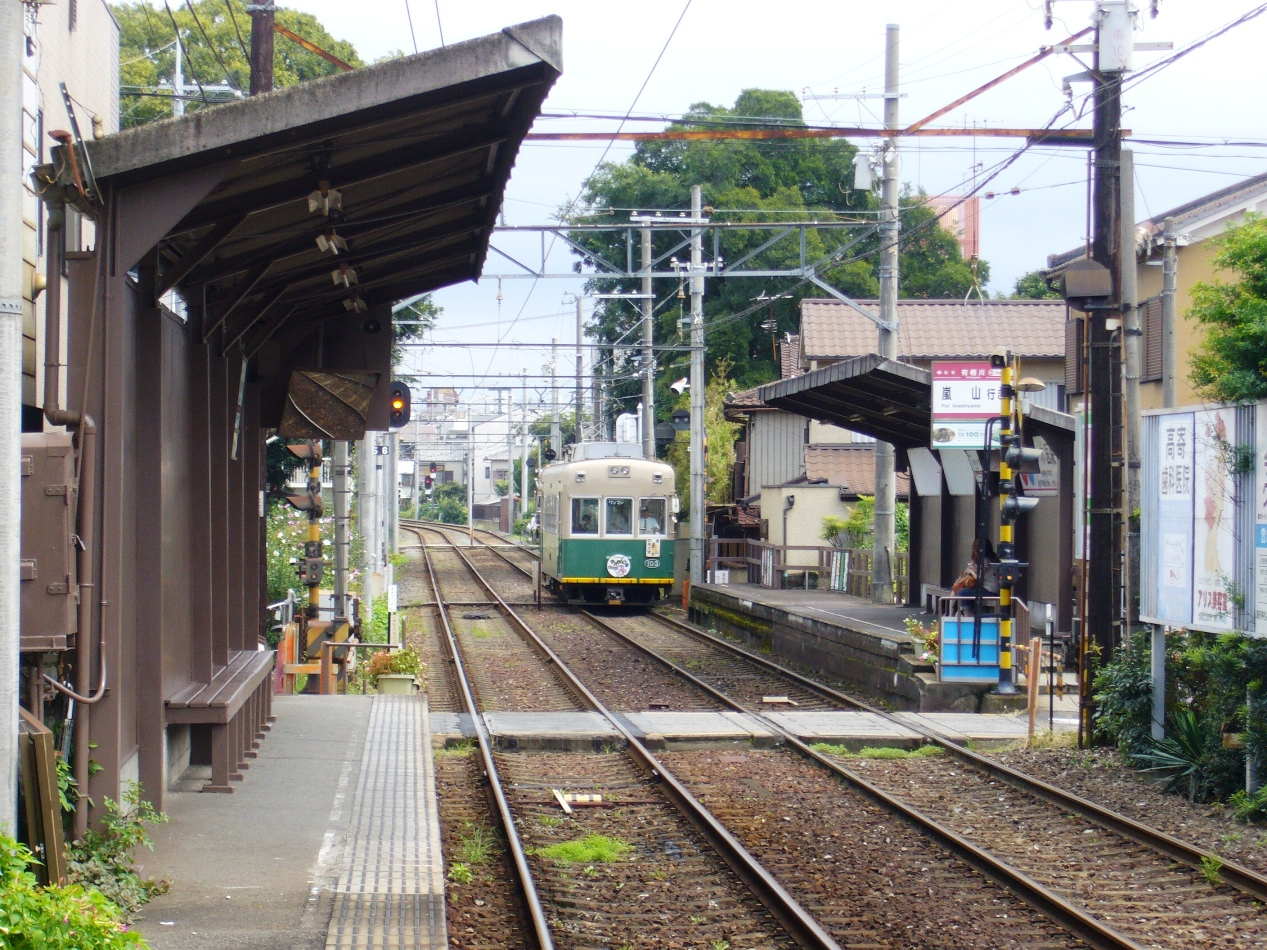
- Station platforms, 2007

General information
- Location: Ukyo-ku, Kyoto; Kyoto Prefecture; Japan
- Coordinates: 35.0151846°N 135.6947674°E
- Operator: Keifuku Electric Railroad
- Line: Randen Arashiyama Line
- Distance: 5.7km from Shijō-Ōmiya
- Platforms: 2
- Tracks: 2

Construction
- Structure type: At-grade

Other information
- Station code: A9
- Website: Official (in Japanese)

History
- Opened: March 25, 1910

Passengers
- FY2015: 0.6 million
Location

Arisugawa Station (有栖川駅, Arisugawa-eki) is a tram stop in Ukyo-ku, Kyoto, Japan. The station is serviced by the Randen Arashiyama Line that begins at Shijō-Ōmiya and continues west to Arashiyama.

== Station layout ==
The station consists of two split platforms at ground level. Platform 1 services trams to Arashiyama, platform 2 for Shijō-Ōmiya.

== Adjacent stations ==
«	Service	»
Randen Arashiyama Line
Katabiranotsuji (A8)	Local	Kurumazaki-Jinja (A10)
