= Omuro-Ninnaji Station =

Tram station in Kyoto, Japan

Omuro-Ninnaji Station: 御室仁和寺駅; おむろにんなじ
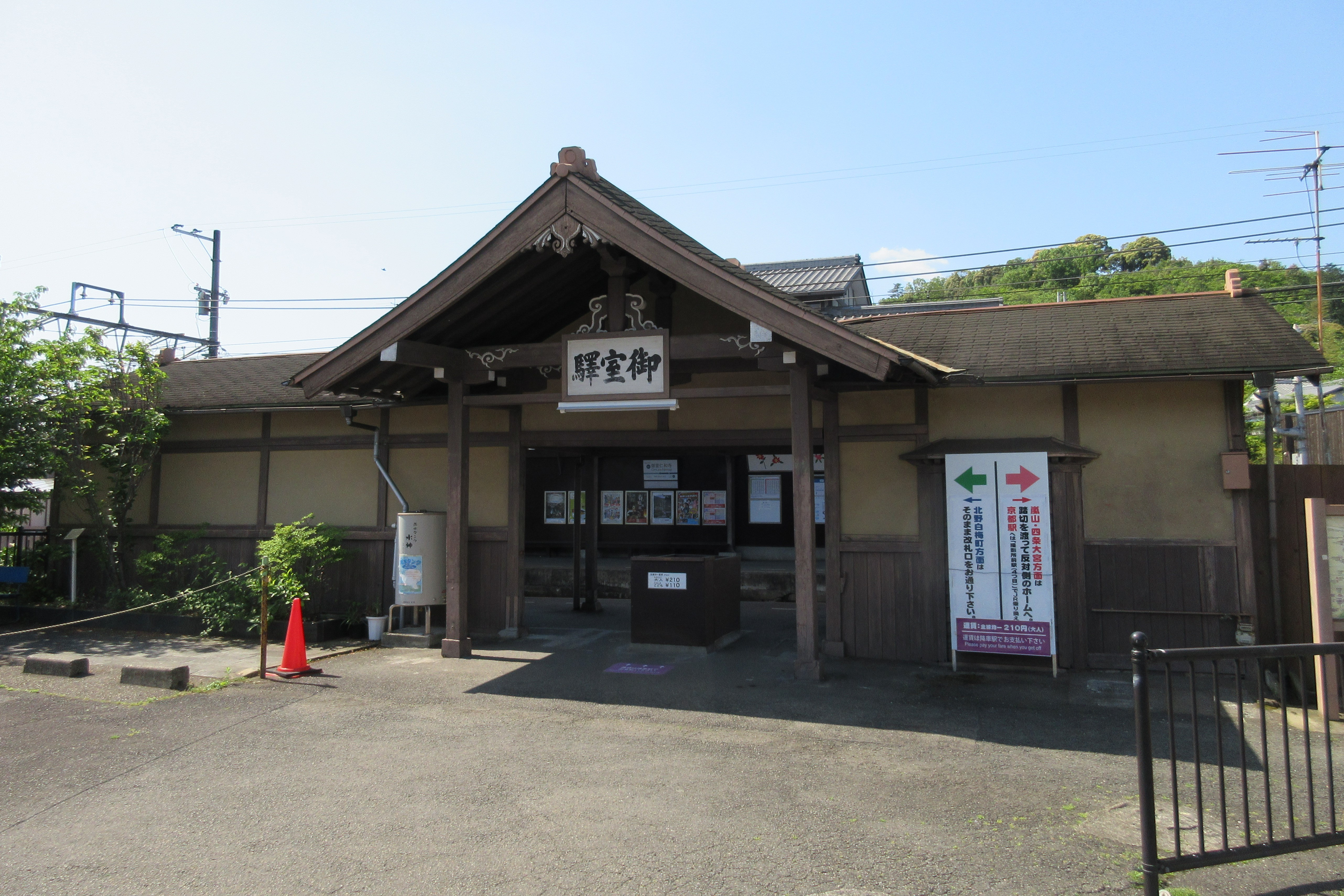
- Station platforms, 2016

General information
- Location: Ukyo-ku, Kyoto; Kyoto Prefecture; Japan
- Coordinates: 35.0264953°N 135.7138366°E
- Operator: Keifuku Electric Railroad
- Line: Randen Arashiyama Line
- Distance: 1.7km from Kitano-Hakubaichō
- Platforms: 2
- Tracks: 2

Construction
- Structure type: At-grade

Other information
- Station code: B5
- Website: Official (in Japanese)

History
- Opened: November 3, 1925

Passengers
- FY2015: 0.2 million
Location

Omuro-Ninnaji Station (御室仁和寺駅, Omuro-Ninnaji-eki) is a tram stop in Ukyo-ku, Kyoto, Japan. The station is serviced by the Randen Kitano Line that begins at Katabiranotsuji and continues to Kitano-Hakubaichō.

== Station layout ==
The station consists of two split-platforms at ground level. Platform 1 services trams to Katabiranotsuji, connecting with the Randen Arashiyama Line. Platform 2 services trams bound for Kitano-Hakubaichō.

== Adjacent stations ==
«	Service	»
Randen Kitano Line
Utano (B4)	Local	Myōshinji (B6)
