= Nishiōji-Sanjō Station =

Tram station in Kyoto, Japan

Nishiōji-Sanjō Station: 西大路三条駅; にしおおじさんじょうえき
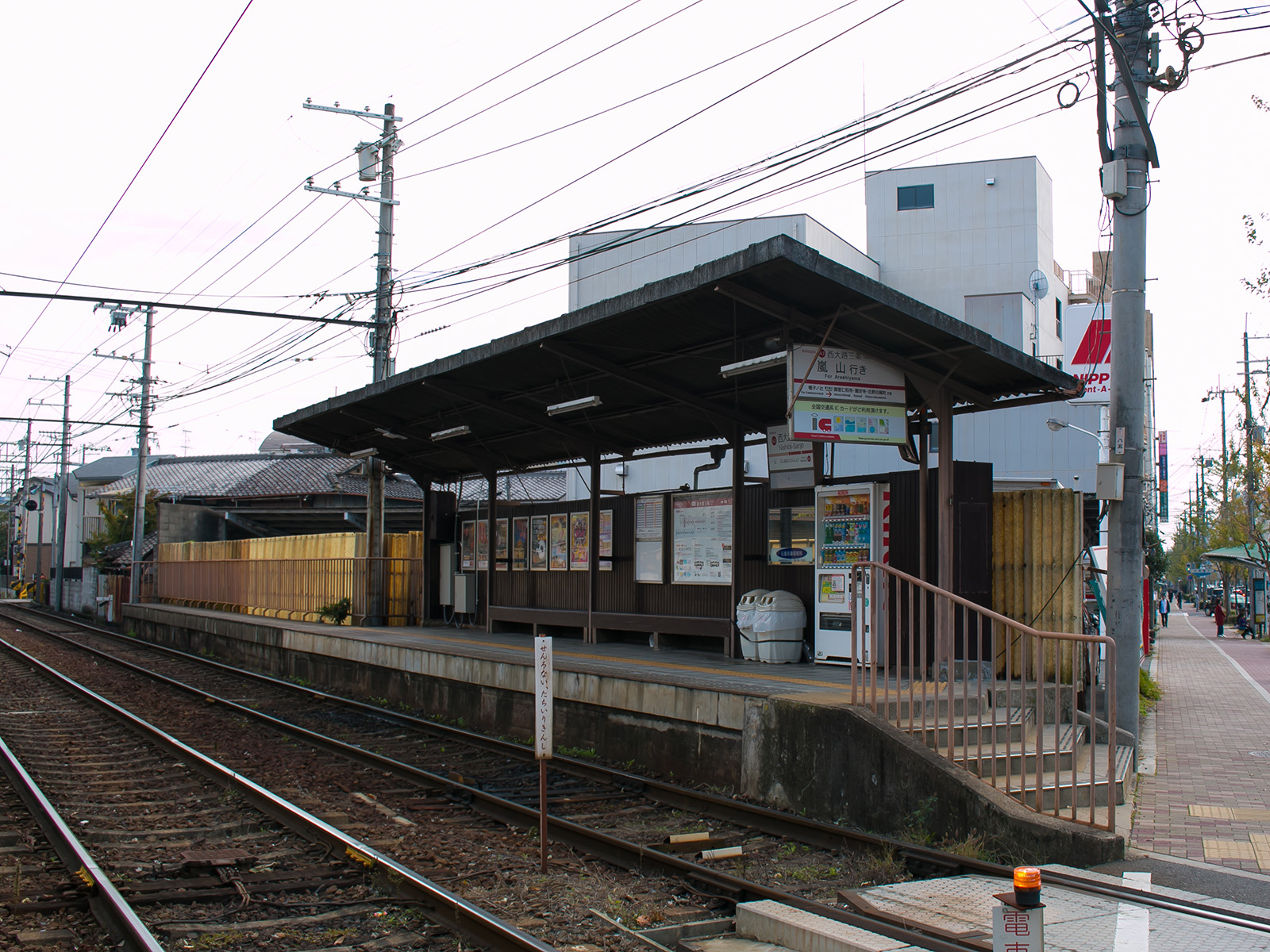
- Station platforms, 2017

General information
- Location: Ukyo-ku, Kyoto; Kyoto Prefecture; Japan
- Coordinates: 35.0084162°N 135.7310633°E
- Operator: Keifuku Electric Railroad
- Line: Randen Arashiyama Line
- Distance: 1.4 km (0.87 mi) from Shijō-Ōmiya
- Platforms: 2
- Tracks: 2

Construction
- Structure type: At-grade

Other information
- Station code: A3
- Website: Official (in Japanese)

History
- Opened: March 25, 1910

Passengers
- FY2015: 0.3 million
Location

Nishiōji-Sanjō Station (西大路三条駅, Nishiōji-Sanjōeki-eki) is a tram stop in Ukyo-ku, Kyoto, Japan. The station is serviced by the Randen Arashiyama Line that begins at Shijō-Ōmiya and continues west to Arashiyama.

== Station layout ==
The main station consists of one platform at ground level, with exit onto the street, for trams to Arashiyama, and a raised traffic island safe zone (安全地帯, anzen chitai) in the middle of the road for trams to Shijō-Ōmiya.

== Adjacent stations ==
«	Service	»
Randen Arashiyama Line
Sai (A2)	Local	Yamanouchi (A4)
