= Arashiyama Station =

Arashiyama Station (嵐山駅) is the name of two train stations in Japan:

- Arashiyama Station (Keifuku) in Ukyō-ku, Kyoto
- Arashiyama Station (Hankyu) in Nishikyō-ku, Kyoto
