= Tokiwa Station =

Tokiwa Station (常盤駅) is the name of three train stations in Japan:

- Tokiwa Station (Kyoto)
- Tokiwa Station (Okayama)
- Tokiwa Station (Yamaguchi)
