= Keifuku Bus =

Japanese bus company

Keifuku Bus Company Ltd
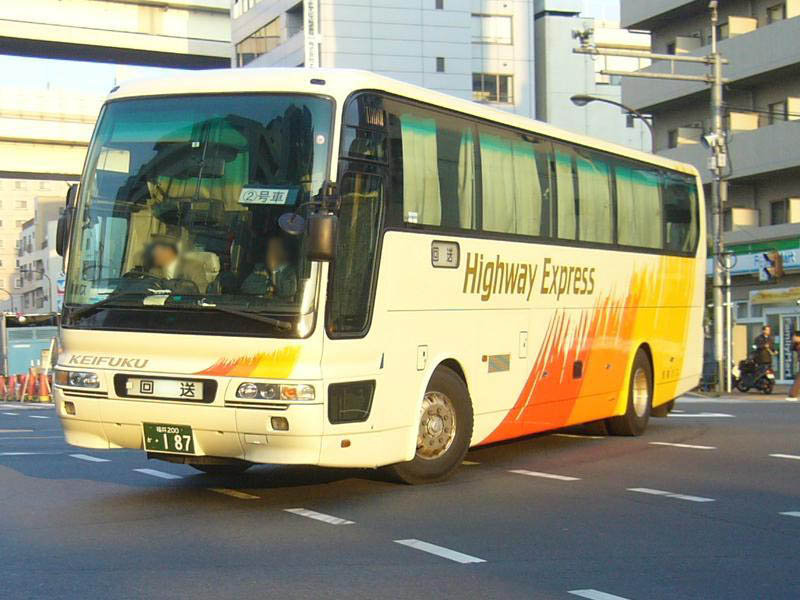
- Native name: 京福バス株式会社
- Company type: Subsidiary
- Industry: Transportation
- Founded: June 1941
- Headquarters: Fukui, Japan
- Area served: Fukui Prefecture
- Revenue: 2,481 million yen (FY2012)
- Net income: 54 million yen
- Total assets: 1,955 million yen
- Number of employees: 313
- Parent: Keifuku Electric Railroad
- Website: bus.keifuku.co.jp

Keifuku Bus (京福バス株式会社, Keifuku Basu Kabushiki Kaisha) is a bus transportation company based in Fukui Prefecture, Japan in operation since June 1941. It is a wholly owned subsidiary of Keifuku Electric Railroad and a part of the Keifuku Group of companies. The company colours are burgundy and taupe.
