= Tōjiin Ritsumeikan University Station =

Tram station in Kyoto, Japan

Tōjiin Ritsumeikan University Station: 等持院・立命館大学衣笠キャンパス前駅; とうじいん・りつめいかんだいがくきぬがさきゃんぱすまえ
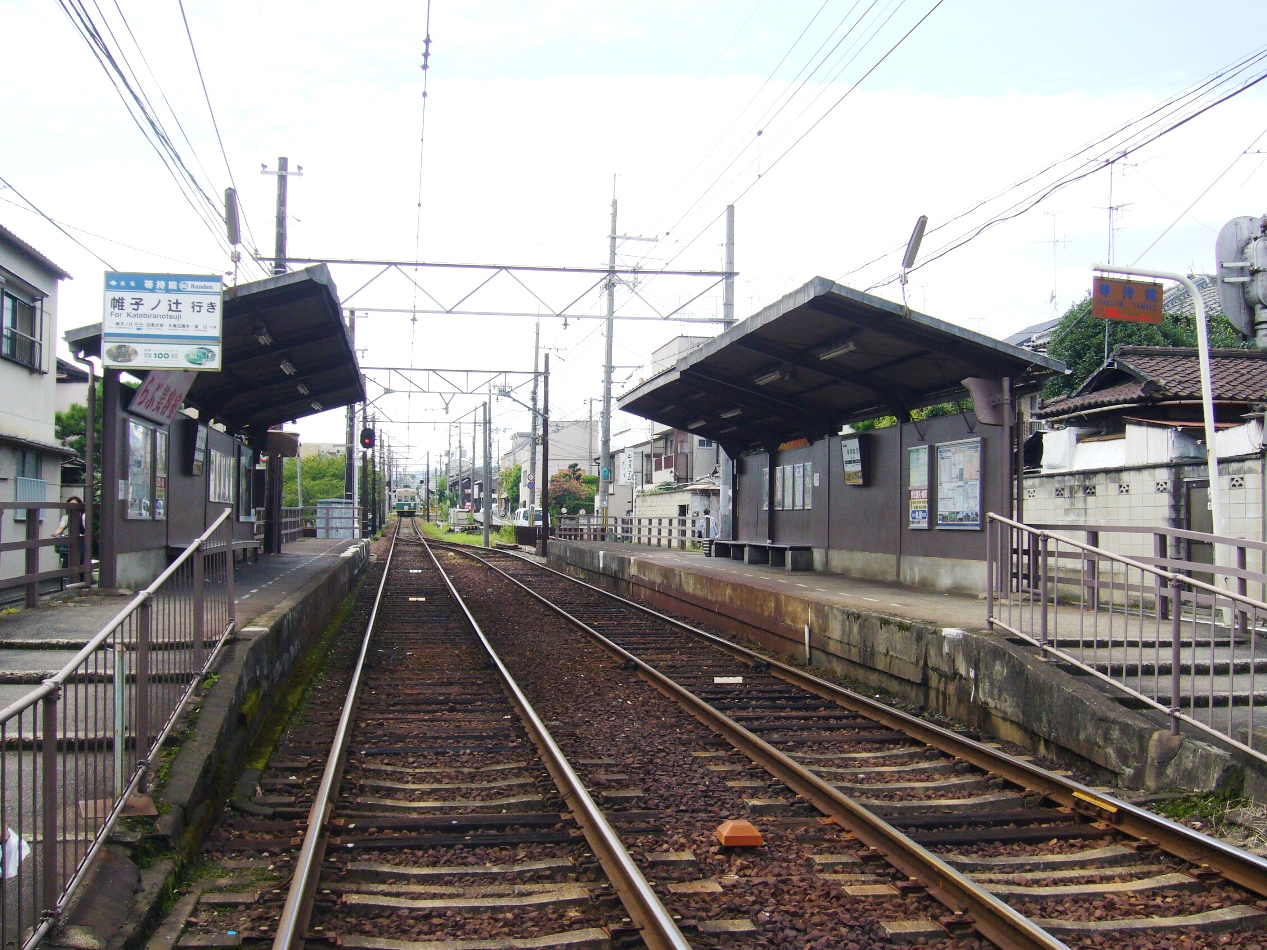
- Station platforms, 2007

General information
- Location: Kita-ku, Kyoto; Kyoto Prefecture; Japan
- Coordinates: 35.0278250°N 135.7240550°E
- Operator: Keifuku Electric Railroad
- Line: Randen Kitano Line
- Distance: 0.7km from Kitano-Hakubaichō
- Platforms: 2
- Tracks: 2

Construction
- Structure type: At-grade

Other information
- Station code: B8
- Website: Official (in Japanese)

History
- Opened: November 3, 1925

Passengers
- FY2015: 0.2 million
Location

Tōjiin Ritsumeikan University Station (等持院・立命館大学衣笠キャンパス前駅, Tōjiin Ritsumeikan-Daigaku-Kinugasa-Kyampasu-mae-eki) is a tram stop in Ukyo-ku, Kyoto, Japan. The station is serviced by the Randen Kitano Line that begins at Katabiranotsuji and continues to Kitano-Hakubaichō. It was once the longest-named train station in Japan, with 26 hiragana characters, until it was surpassed by Toyota Mobility Toyama G Square Gofuku-mae in Toyama in 2021.

The station was renamed from Tojiin Station on March 20, 2020 in order to reflect its proximity to the main Kinugasa Campus of Ritsumeikan University. It was reported that while train operator Keifuku had considered shortening the new station name, they decided against it after discovering it would become the longest-named train station in the country.

== Station layout ==
The station consists of two split-platforms at ground level. Platform 1 services trams to Katabiranotsuji, connecting with the Randen Arashiyama Line. Platform 2 services trams bound for Kitano-Hakubaichō.

== Adjacent stations ==
«	Service	»
Randen Kitano Line
Ryōanji (B7)	Local	Kitano-Hakubaichō (B9)

== See also ==
List of records of Japan
