= Keifuku Electric Railroad =

Railroad company in Kyoto Prefecture, Japan

Keifuku Electric Railroad Co., Ltd.
- Native name: 京福電気鉄道株式会社
- Romanized name: Keifuku Denki Tetsudō Kabushiki-gaisha
- Company type: Public (K.K.)
- Traded as: TYO: 9049
- Industry: Private railroad
- Predecessor: Kyoto Dento
- Founded: 2 May 1942 in Kyoto, Japan
- Headquarters: Kyoto, Japan
- Area served: Japan
- Revenue: ▲¥12.18 billion (2015)
- Operating income: ▲¥698 million (2015)
- Net income: ▲¥658 million (2015)
- Total assets: ▲¥18.32 billion (2015)
- Total equity: ▲¥5.23 billion (2015)
- Number of employees: 885 (2015)
- Parent: Keihan Electric Railway Co., Ltd.
- Subsidiaries: Keifuku Bus; Kyoto Bus; Mikuni Kanko Sangyo
- Website: www.keifuku.co.jp

Keifuku Electric Railroad Co., Ltd. (京福電気鉄道株式会社, Keifuku Denki Tetsudō Kabushiki-gaisha) is a railroad company based in Kyoto Prefecture, Japan (but with offices in Fukui Prefecture) in operation since March 2, 1942. It is a parent company of Keifuku Bus and Kyoto Bus, and an affiliated company of Keihan Electric Railway, which owns 42.89% of the company stock. The company's stock is traded on the second section of the Tokyo Stock Exchange.

== Lines ==
This railway started service in 1910, operated at that time by Arashiyama Electric Tram Railway (嵐山電車軌道, Arashiyama Densha Kidō). It was transferred to the Kyoto-based electric power generation company Kyoto Dento (京都電燈, Kyōto Dentō). Later it built the Kitano Line.

Formerly the company operated several railway lines in Fukui Prefecture. Some of them are now operated by Echizen Railway.

The Eizan Electric Railway also belonged to Keifuku until 1985.

=== Randen ===
Map

The Randen (嵐電, Randen) is a small network of light rail lines classified legally as tramways in Kyoto.

==== Arashiyama Line ====
Arashiyama Line
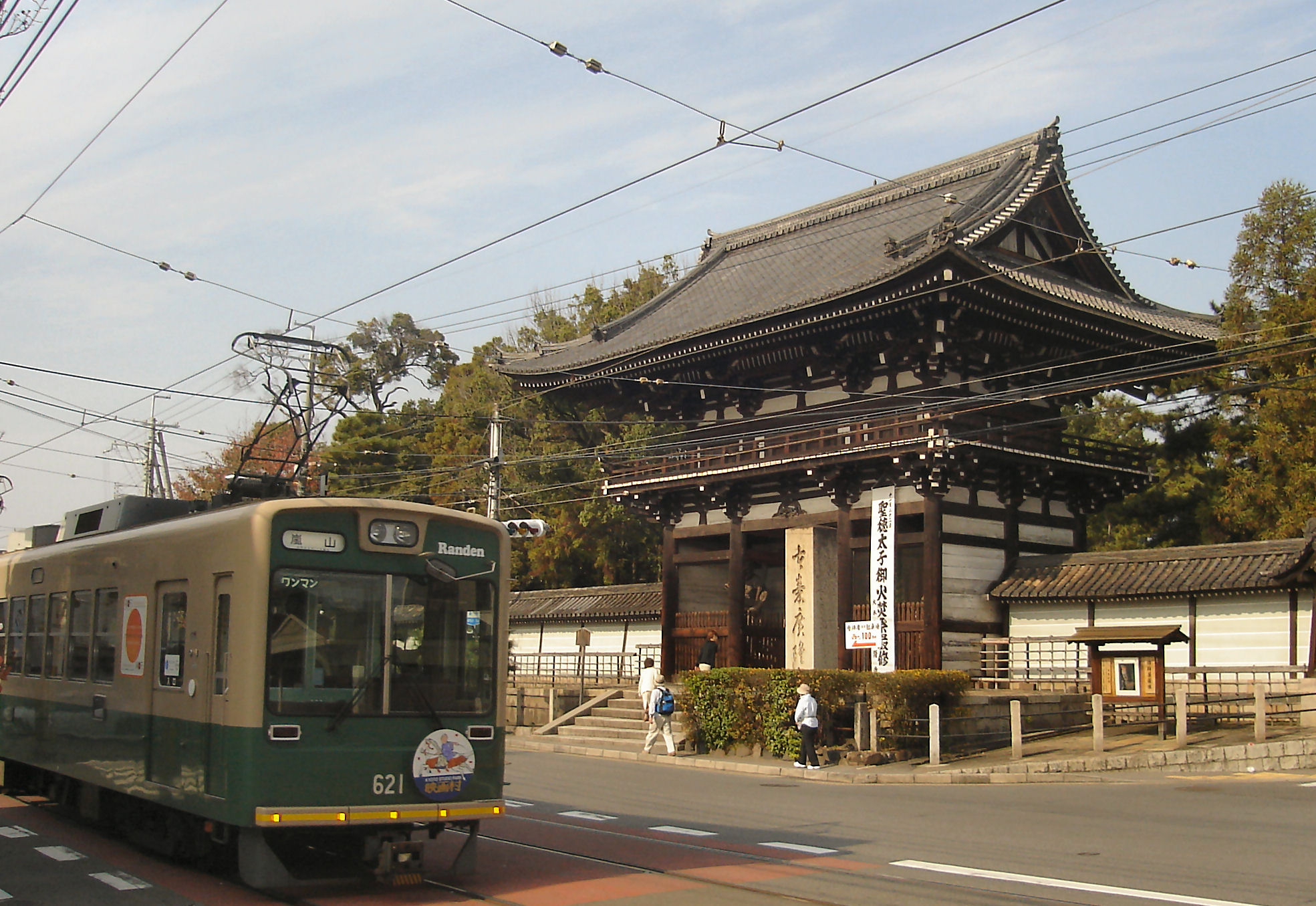
- A Randen tram car at Kōryūji Station, in front of Kōryū-ji Temple

Overview
- Native name: 嵐山本線
- Line number: A
- Termini: Shijō-Ōmiya; Arashiyama
- Stations: 13
- Color on map: Red
- Website: randen.keifuku.co.jp/en/index.html

Service
- Depot(s): Saiin

History
- Opened: 25 March 1910

Technical
- Line length: 7.2 km (4.5 mi)
- Track gauge: 1,435 mm (4 ft 8 1/2 in) standard gauge
- Electrification: 600 V DC Overhead line
- Operating speed: 40 km/h (25 mph)
Route map
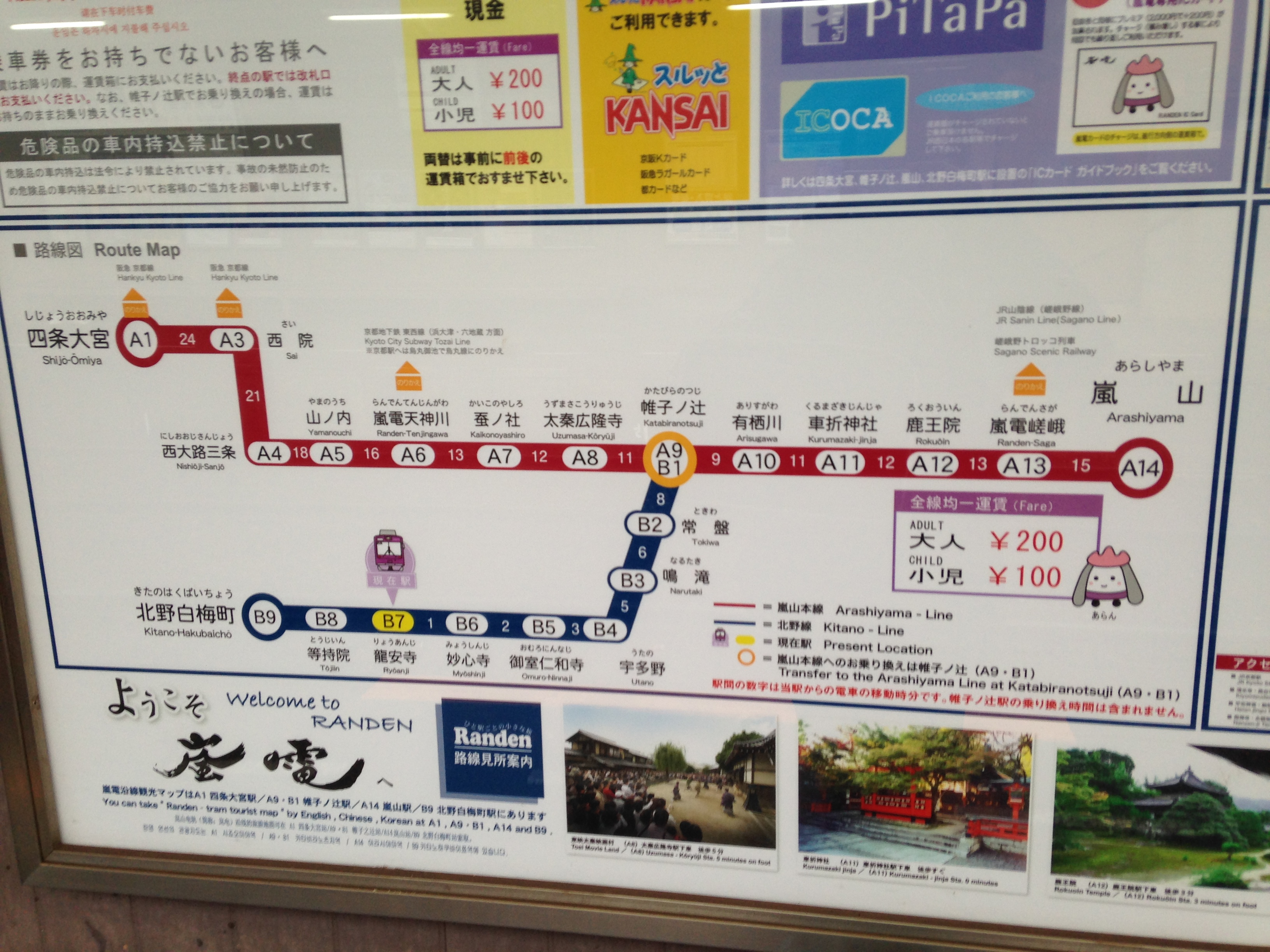

The Arashiyama Line (嵐山本線, Arashiyama Honsen) connects Kyoto's city center (Shijo-Omiya terminal) and scenic Arashiyama area in the western suburb.

No.	Station [Japanese]	Distance (km)		Location
No.	Station [Japanese]		Transfers	Location
A1	Shijō-Ōmiya [四条大宮]	0	Hankyu Kyoto Main Line (HK-84: Ōmiya)	Shimogyo-ku, Kyoto
A2	Sai [西院]	1.4	Hankyu Kyoto Main Line (HK-83)	Nakagyo-ku, Kyoto
A3	Nishiōji-Sanjō [西大路三条]	2.0		Ukyo-ku, Kyoto
A4	Yamanouchi [山ノ内]	2.8		Ukyo-ku, Kyoto
A5	Randen-Tenjingawa [嵐電天神川]	3.7	Kyoto Municipal Subway Tozai Line (T17: Uzumasa Tenjingawa)	Ukyo-ku, Kyoto
A6	Kaikonoyashiro [蚕ノ社]	3.9		Ukyo-ku, Kyoto
A7	Uzumasa-Kōryūji [太秦広隆寺]	4.4		Ukyo-ku, Kyoto
A8	Katabiranotsuji [帷子ノ辻]	5.2	Randen Kitano Line; JR West Sanin Main Line (Sagano Line) (JR-E07: Uzumasa)	Ukyo-ku, Kyoto
A9	Arisugawa [有栖川]	5.7		Ukyo-ku, Kyoto
A10	Kurumazaki-Jinja [車折神社]	6.2		Ukyo-ku, Kyoto
A11	Rokuōin [鹿王院]	6.5		Ukyo-ku, Kyoto
A12	Randen-Saga [嵐電嵯峨]	6.9	JR West Sanin Main Line (Sagano Line) (JR-E08: Saga-Arashiyama); Sagano Romantic Train (Torokko Saga)	Ukyo-ku, Kyoto
A13	Arashiyama [嵐山]	7.2		Ukyo-ku, Kyoto

==== Kitano Line ====
Kitano Line
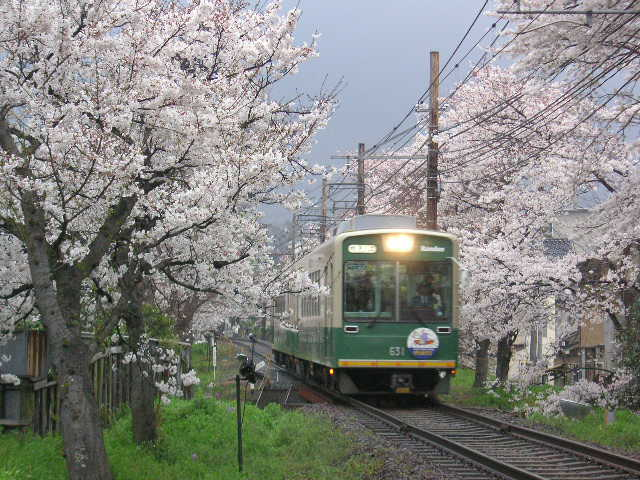
- A Randen tram car under cherry blossoms

Overview
- Native name: 北野線
- Line number: B
- Termini: Kitano-Hakubaichō; Katabiranotsuji
- Stations: 10
- Color on map: Blue
- Website: randen.keifuku.co.jp/en/index.html

Service
- Depot(s): Saiin

History
- Opened: 3 November 1925

Technical
- Line length: 3.8 km (2.4 mi)
- Track gauge: 1,435 mm (4 ft 8 1/2 in) standard gauge
- Electrification: Overhead line
- Operating speed: 40 km/h (25 mph)
Route map
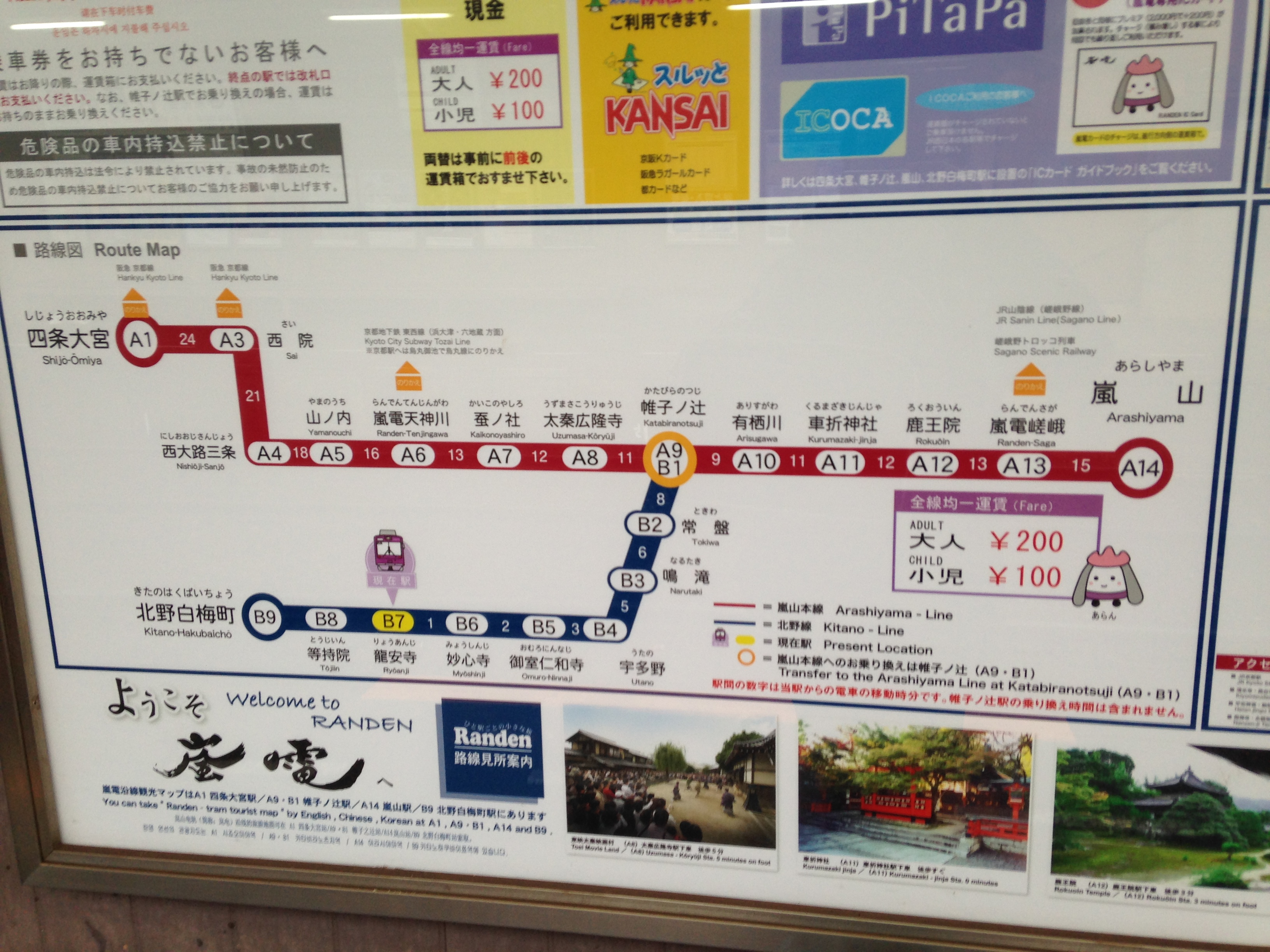

The Kitano Line (北野線, Kitano Sen) is from Kitano Hakubaicho Station near Kitano Tenmangū to Katabiranotsuji Station in the midst of Arashiyama (Main) Line.

No.	Station [Japanese]	Distance (km)		Location
No.	Station [Japanese]		Transfers	Location
B9	Kitano-Hakubaichō [北野白梅町]	0		Kita-ku, Kyoto
B8	Tōjiin Ritsumeikan University [等持院・立命館大学衣笠キャンパス前]	0.7		Kita-ku, Kyoto
B7	Ryōanji [龍安寺]	0.9		Ukyo-ku, Kyoto
B6	Myōshinji [妙心寺]	1.3		Ukyo-ku, Kyoto
B5	Omuro-Ninnaji [御室仁和寺]	1.7		Ukyo-ku, Kyoto
B4	Utano [宇多野]	2.1		Ukyo-ku, Kyoto
B3	Narutaki [鳴滝]	2.6		Ukyo-ku, Kyoto
B2	Tokiwa [常盤]	2.9		Ukyo-ku, Kyoto
B1	Satsueisho-mae [撮影所前]	3.5	JR West Sanin Main Line (Sagano Line) (JR-E07: Uzumasa)	Ukyo-ku, Kyoto
A8	Katabiranotsuji [帷子ノ辻]	3.8	Randen Arashiyama Line; JR West Sanin Main Line (Sagano Line) (JR-E07: Uzumasa)	Ukyo-ku, Kyoto

=== Eizan Cable ===
Eizan Cable (叡山ケーブル, Eizan Kēburu), officially the Cable Line (鋼索線, Kōsaku-sen), is a funicular line in Sakyo-ku, Kyoto.

=== Eizan Ropeway ===
Eizan Ropeway (叡山ロープウェイ, Eizan Rōpuwei) is an aerial tramway in Sakyo-ku, Kyoto. The line length is 0.5 km (0.31 mi).

The cable and ropeway lines are for visitors to Mount Hiei on the northeastern edge of the city, together with Eizan Electric Railway's Eizan Main Line.

== History ==
=== Arashiyama Line ===
The Arashiyama Tram opened the line in 1910, with 1,435 mm (4 ft 8 1/2 in) gauge and electrified at 600 V DC. The Kyoto Electric Light Company acquired the line in 1918, and double-tracked the track between 1925 and 1928. Keifuku acquired the line in 1942.

=== Kitano Line ===
The Kyoto Electric Light Company opened the line between 1925 and 1926, and double-tracked the Tokiwa to Narutaki section in 1930. Plans to double-track the rest of the line were abandoned as a result of the economic depression. Keifuku acquired the line in 1942.

=== Former connecting lines ===
- Arashiyama Station: A 3 km (1.9 mi) 1,435 mm (4 ft 8 1/2 in) line electrified at 600 V DC and dual track except for the Kiyotaki tunnel operated to Kiyotaki between 1929 and 1944. It connected to a 2 km (1.2 mi) 1,067 mm (3 ft 6 in) funicular which climbed 638 m (2,093 ft) to Atago Jinja on Mount Atago, Kosaku line which operated for the same period. Closed due to war time austerity measures, efforts to re-establish the incline in the 1950s were unsuccessful. (Atagosan Tetsudo)

== Etymology ==
"Keifuku" is composed of two characters "京" and "福", the former denoting Kyoto and the latter Fukui. As the Kyoto Dento lines used to be in Fukui, the hydraulic source, and in Kyoto, the company took the name "Keifuku".

== See also ==
- List of railway lines in Japan
