= Uzumasa Station =

Railway station in Kyoto, Japan

Coordinates: 35°1′1.52″N 135°42′4.71″E

Uzumasa Station 太秦駅
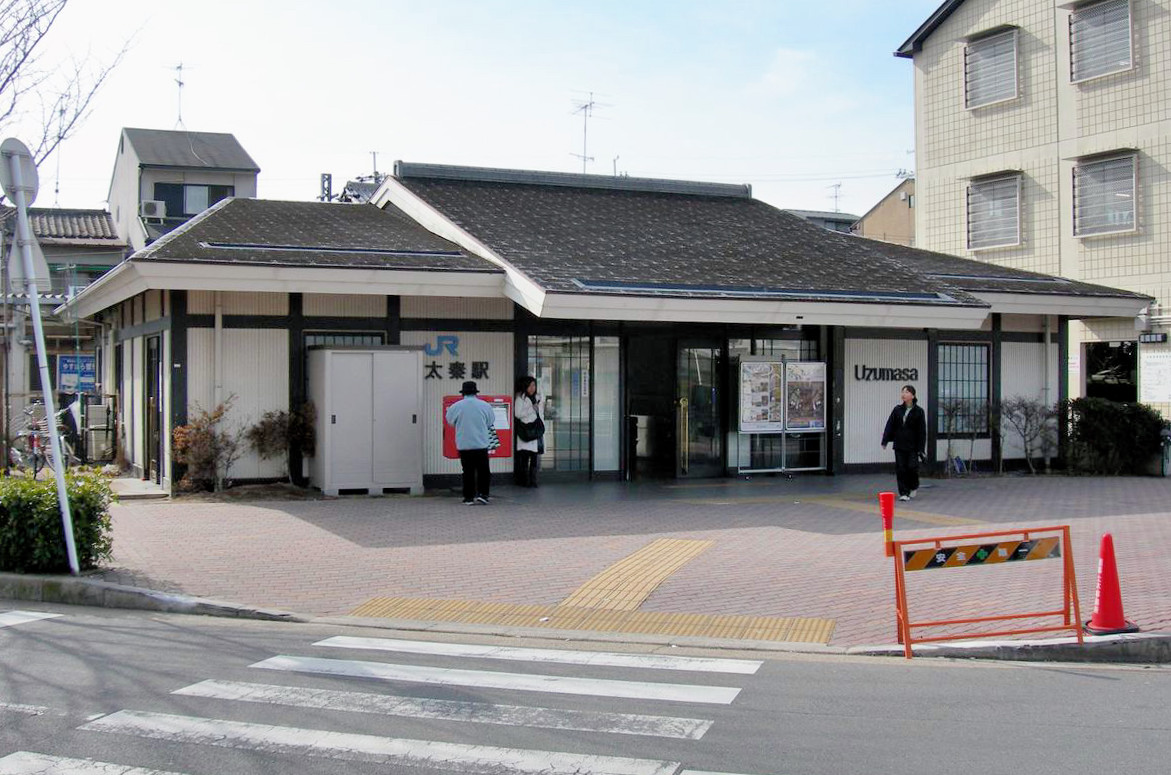
- Uzumasa Station in January 2008

General information
- Location: Ukyō-ku, Kyoto, Kyoto Prefecture; Japan
- Operator: JR West
- Line: E Sagano Line
- Platforms: 2 side platforms
- Tracks: 2

Construction
- Structure type: Ground level
- Accessible: Yes

Other information
- Station code: JR-E07

History
- Opened: 11 March 1989

Passengers
- FY 2023: 8,516 daily

Services
Preceding station	JR West	Following station
Saga-Arashiyama towards Sonobe	Sagano Line Local	Hanazono towards Kyoto
Location
- Location within Japan

Uzumasa Station (太秦駅, Uzumasa-eki) is a train station on the Sagano Line in Ukyo-ku, Kyoto, Japan, operated by West Japan Railway Company (JR West).

== Lines ==
Uzumasa Station is served by the Sagano Line, which is part of the Sanin Main Line.

== Layout ==
The station has two side platforms. Track No. 1 is used by trains bound for Kyoto and Track No. 2 is used by trains bound for Kameoka and Sonobe.

=== Platforms ===
1	■ Sagano Line	for Kyoto
2	■ Sagano Line	for Kameoka and Sonobe

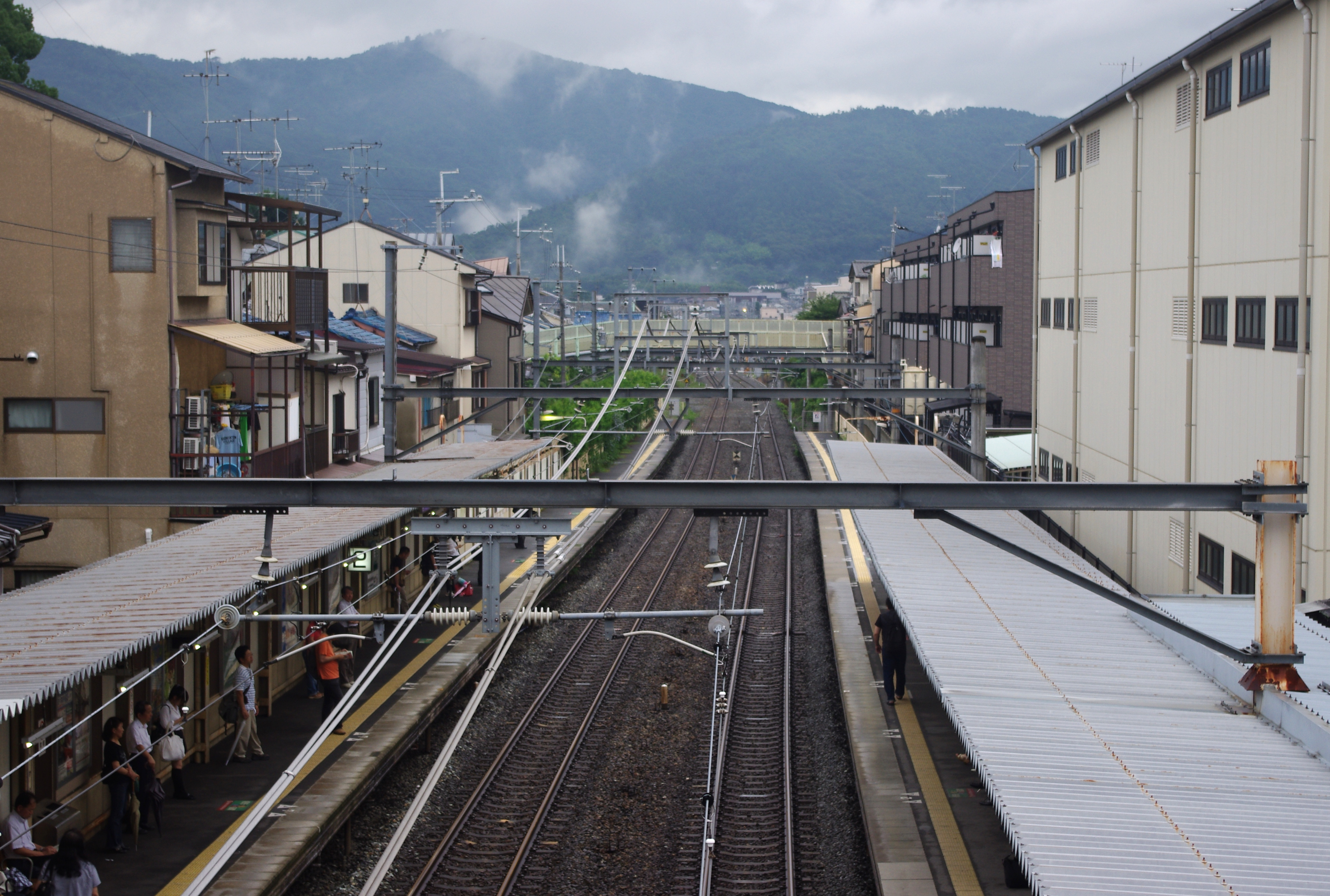
The platforms viewed from above in July 2010

== History ==
Uzumasa Station opened on 11 March 1989.

Station numbering was introduced in March 2018 with Uzumasa being assigned station number JR-E07.

== Surrounding area ==
- Katabiranotsuji Station (Randen)
- Toei Kyoto Studio Park

== See also ==
- List of railway stations in Japan
