= Katabiranotsuji Station =

Tram station in Kyoto, Japan

Katabiranotsuji Station: 帷子ノ辻駅; かたびらのつじ
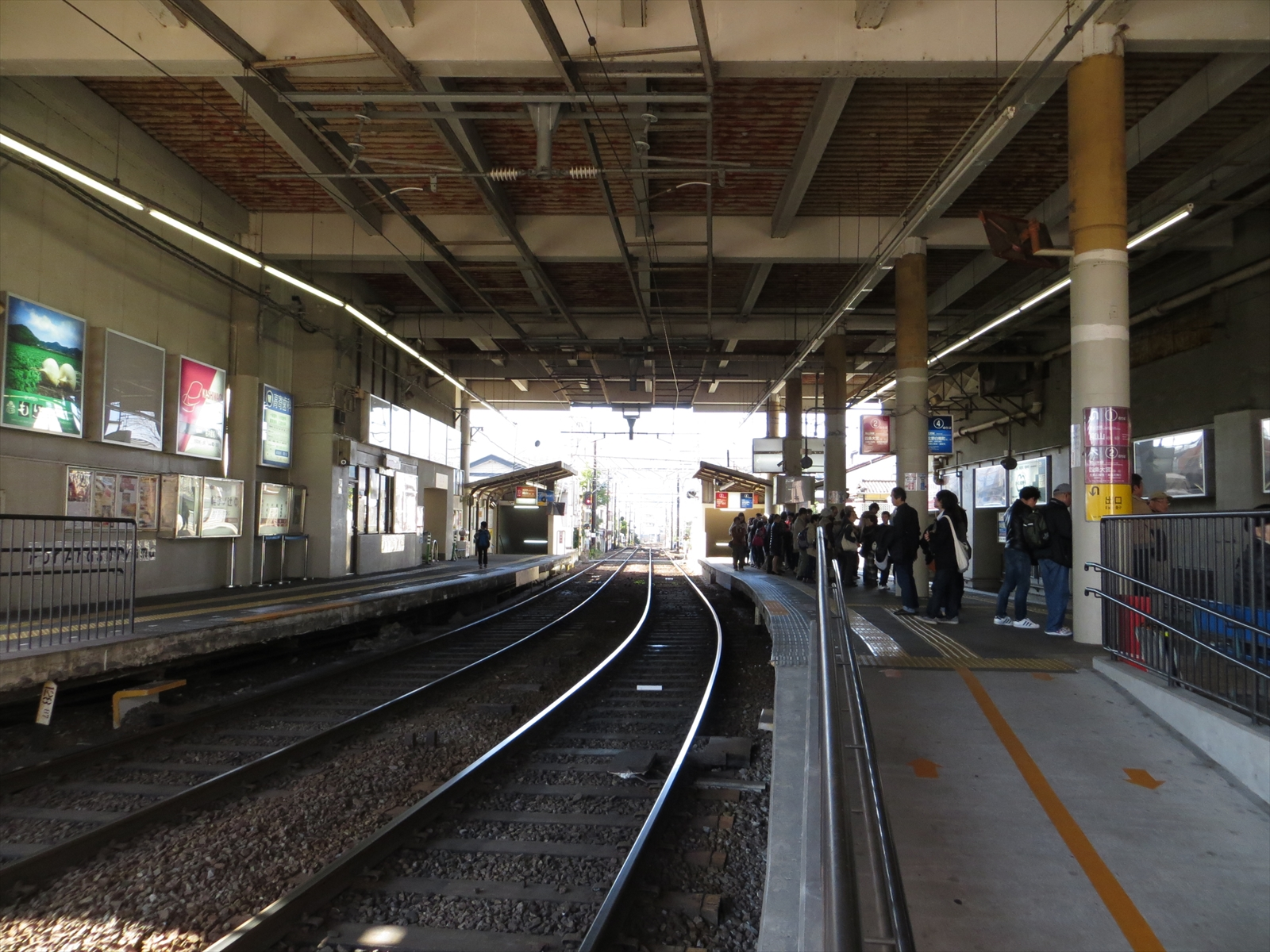
- Station platforms, 2014

General information
- Location: Ukyo-ku, Kyoto; Kyoto Prefecture; Japan
- Coordinates: 35.0152384°N 135.7002836°E
- Operator: Keifuku Electric Railroad
- Lines: Randen Arashiyama Line; Randen Kitano Line
- Distance: 5.2 km (3.2 mi) from Shijō-Ōmiya; 3.8 km (2.4 mi) from Kitano-Hakubaichō
- Platforms: 3
- Tracks: 4
- Connections: JR West Sagano Line (JR-E07: Uzumasa)

Construction
- Structure type: At-grade

Other information
- Station code: A8
- Website: Official (in Japanese)

History
- Opened: March 10, 1926

Passengers
- FY2015: 1.4 million
Location

Katabiranotsuji Station (帷子ノ辻駅, Katabiranotsuji-eki) is a tram stop and interchange station in Ukyo-ku, Kyoto, Japan. The station is serviced by the Randen Arashiyama Line that begins at Shijō-Ōmiya and continues west to Arashiyama.

It is also the western terminus of the Randen Kitano Line that continues through Ukyo-ku and Kita-ku, and terminates at Kitano-Hakubaichō.

== Station layout ==
The station consists of four platforms at ground level, with a concourse. Platforms 1 and 2 are for through-services on the Arashiyama line. Platforms 3 and 4 begin the Kitano line bound for Kitano-Hakubaichō. The platforms and concourse are wheelchair accessible, and have ticket barriers.

== Adjacent stations ==
«	Service	»
Randen Arashiyama Line
Uzumasa-Kōryūji (A7)	Local	Arisugawa (A9)
Randen Kitano Line
Terminus	Local	Satsueisho-mae (B1)
