= Shijō-Ōmiya Station =

Tram station in Kyoto, Japan

Shijō-Ōmiya Station: しじょうおおみやえき
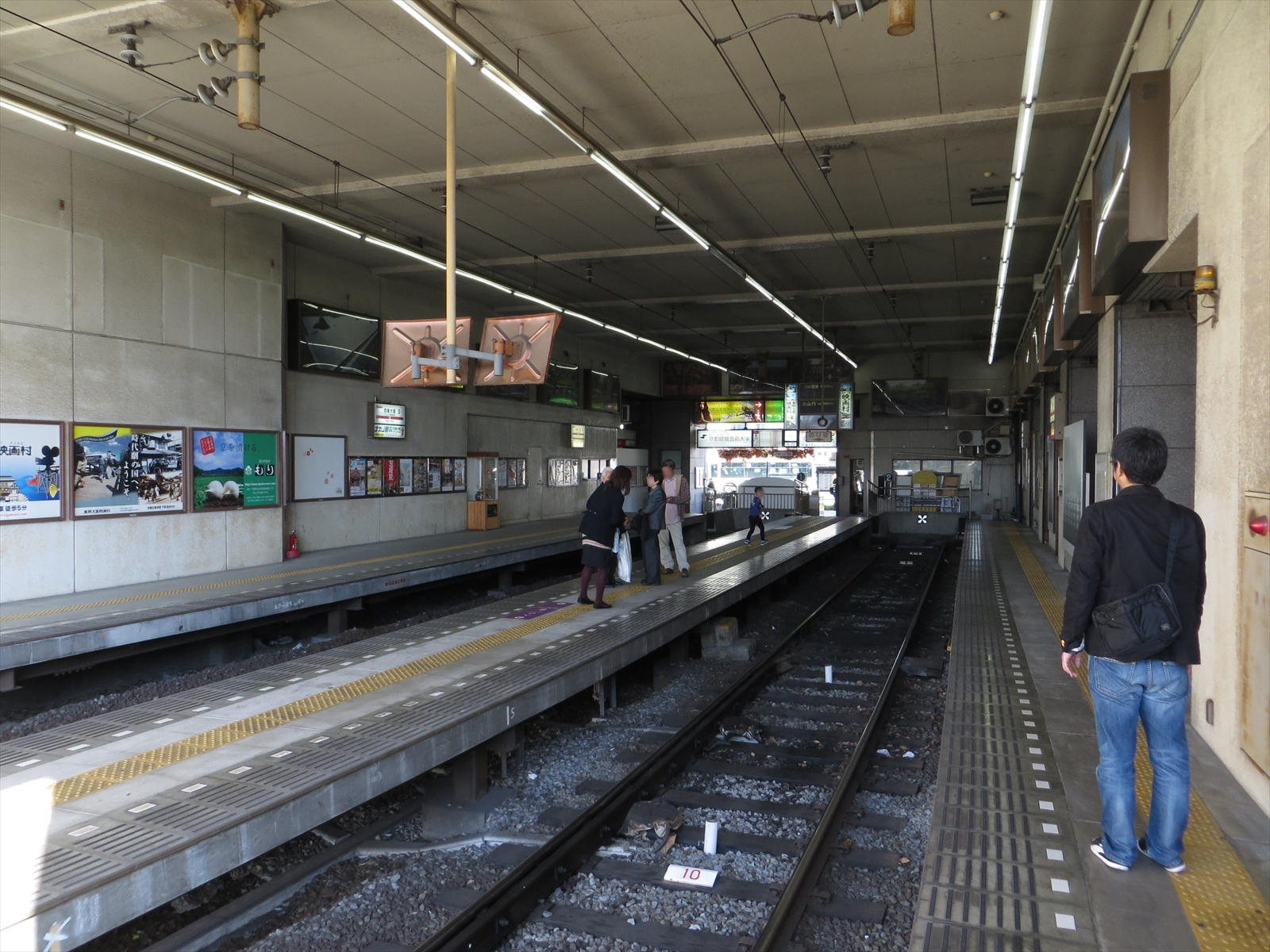
- Station platforms, 2014

General information
- Location: Shimogyō-ku, Kyoto; Kyoto Prefecture; Japan
- Coordinates: 35.0033399°N 135.7485669°E
- Operator: Keifuku Electric Railroad
- Line: Randen Arashiyama Line
- Platforms: 3
- Tracks: 2
- Connections: Hankyu Kyoto Main Line (HK-84: Ōmiya Station)

Construction
- Structure type: At-grade

Other information
- Station code: A1
- Website: Official (in Japanese)

History
- Opened: March 25, 1910

Passengers
- FY2015: 2.5 million
Location

Shijō-Ōmiya Station (四条大宮駅, Shijō-Ōmiya-eki) is a tram stop in Shimogyō-ku, Kyoto, Japan. The station is the eastern terminus of the Randen Arashiyama Line, which continues west through Ukyo-ku, and terminates at Arashiyama.

== Station layout ==
The station consists of two double-bay platforms at ground level, with a concourse. Both service trams heading to Arashiyama.

== Adjacent stations ==
«	Service	»
Randen Arashiyama Line
Terminus	Local	Sai (A2)
