= Arashiyama Station (Keifuku) =

Tram station in Kyoto, Japan

Arashiyama Station: 嵐山駅; あらしやま
- Station entrance and surrounding shops 2026

General information
- Location: Ukyo-ku, Kyoto; Kyoto Prefecture; Japan
- Coordinates: 35.015214°N 135.677694°E
- Operator: Keifuku Electric Railroad
- Line: Randen Arashiyama Line
- Distance: 7.2km from Shijō-Ōmiya
- Platforms: 4
- Tracks: 3
- Connections: Hankyu Arashiyama Line (HK-98: Arashiyama) JR West Sagano Sanin Main Line (Saga Arashiyama E07) Sagano Scenic Railway (Torokko Saga)

Construction
- Structure type: At-grade

Other information
- Station code: A13
- Website: Official (in Japanese)

History
- Opened: March 25, 1910

Passengers
- FY2015: 1.4 million
Location

Arashiyama Station (嵐山駅, Arashiyama-eki) is a tram stop in Ukyo-ku, Kyoto, Japan, and the western terminus of the Randen Arashiyama Line that begins at Shijō-Ōmiya. The station includes a small shopping arcade, outdoor eating areas, a foot bath, a garden featuring cherry and maple trees, as well as the "Kimono Forest," a collection of 600 kimono gowns wrapped around poles with LED lighting inside developed by the interior designer Yasumichi Morita.

== History ==
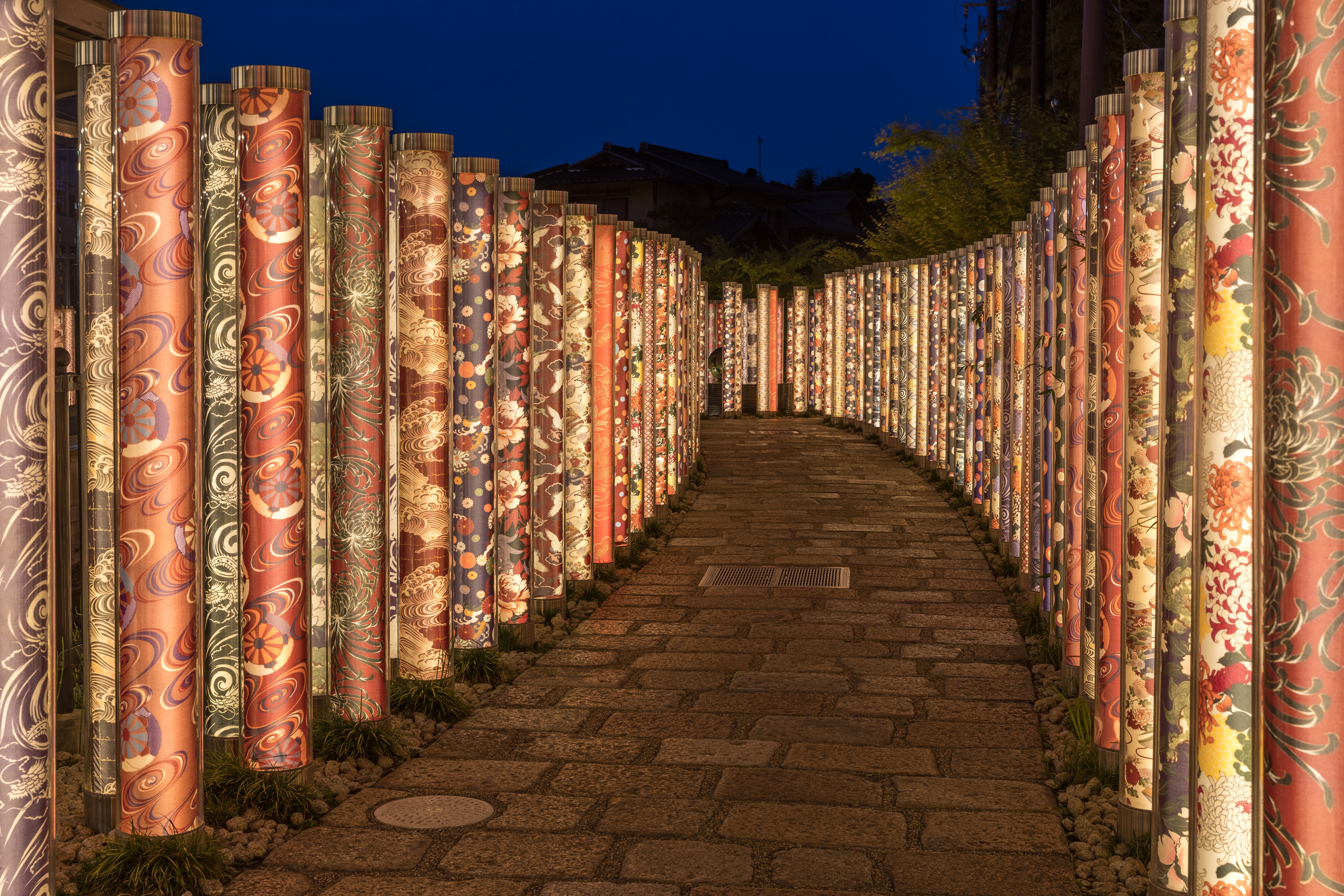
The "Kimono Forest" lit at night

Arashiyama station opened on March 25, 1910, as the terminal station for the Arashiyama Railway connecting Arashiyama with Shijō-Ōmiya. The station was reconstructed in 1929 to accommodate the now-defunct Atagosan Railway. This line started at Arashiyama and headed westward towards Kiyotaki via the Kiyotaki Tunnel, where passengers would transfer to a narrow-gauge funicular to proceed their journey to the top of Mt. Atago. In 1944 the Atagosan Railway was abandoned, just two years after the Keifuku Electric Railroad seized operation of the Arashiyama Line.

In 2002 the "Arashiyama Hannari Hokkori Square" plaza was built, with the addition of the iconic foot bath in 2004. The station was completely renovated in 2007 and 2013.

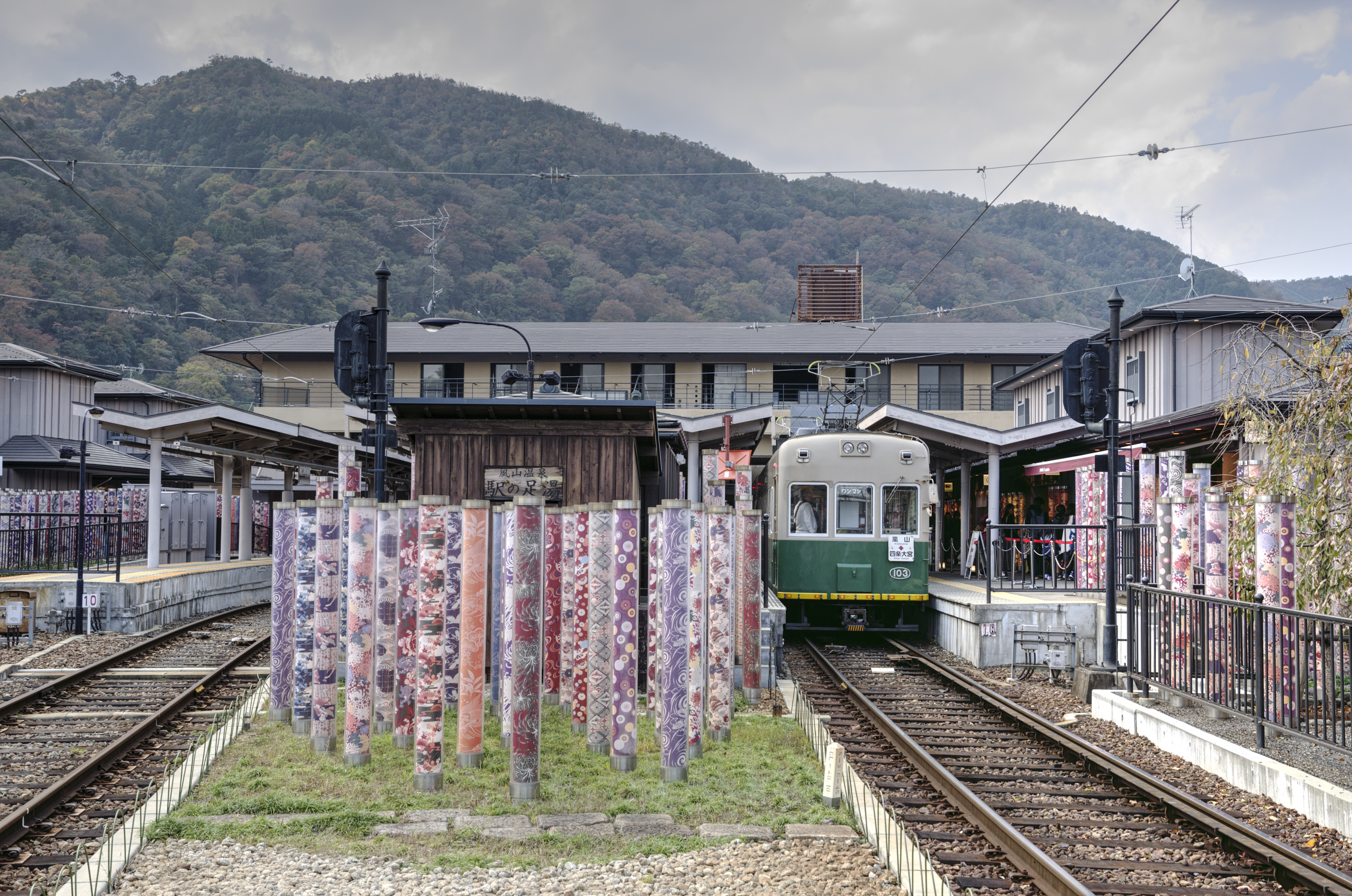
Arashiyama station (Keifuku), with train, Kimono forest around, and Arashiyama mountain on the background

== Station layout ==
The station consists of three platforms at ground level, with a wheelchair-accessible concourse and ticket barriers. All platforms service trams bound for Shijō-Ōmiya. Tracks 1 and 2 are primarily used.

Track	Line	Destination
1	Arashiyama Line	Shijo-Omiya via Katabiranotsuji
2	Arashiyama Line	Shijo-Omiya via Katabiranotsuji
3	Arashiyama Line	Shijo-Omiya via Katabiranotsuji Special services to Kitano-Hakubaicho

== Adjacent stations ==
«	Service	»
Randen Arashiyama Line
Randen-Saga (A11)	Local	Terminus

== Surrounding area ==
- Tenryū-ji Temple
- Nonomiya Shrine
- Arashiyama Bamboo Grove
- Kogenji Temple
- Kyoto Arashiyama Orgel Museum
- Hogonin Temple
- Iwatayama Monkey Park
- Okochi Sanzo Villa
- Saga-Torimoto
- Hozu River
- Togetsukyo Bridge
- Hankyu Arashiyama Station
- JR West Saga-Arashiyama Station
- Sagano Scenic Railway Torokko Saga Station
