= Kitano-Hakubaichō Station =

Tram station in Kyoto, Japan

Kitano-Hakubaichō Station 北野白梅町駅
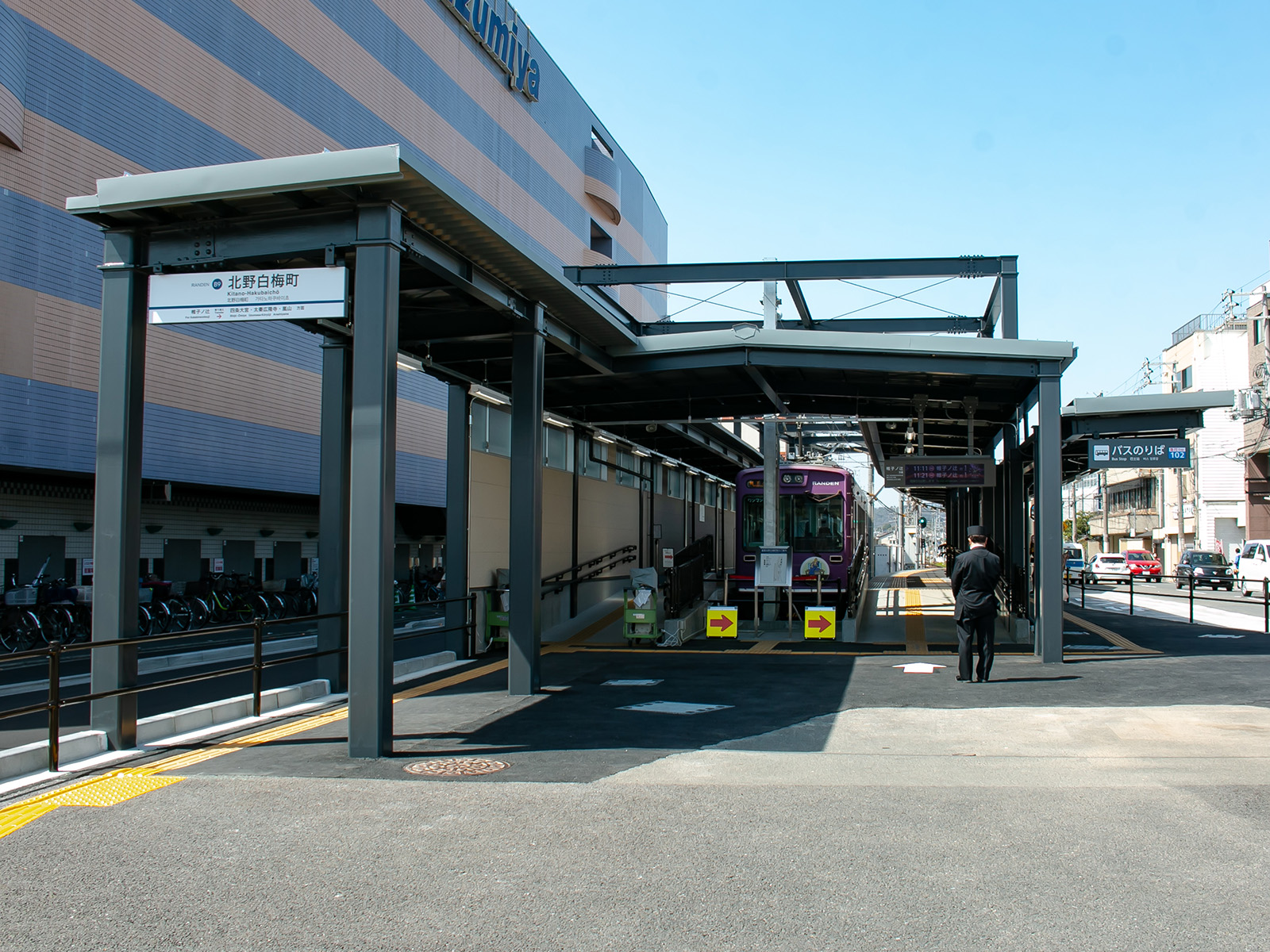

General information
- Location: Kita-ku, Kyoto; Japan
- Coordinates: 35°01′39″N 135°43′52″E
- Operator: Keifuku Electric Railroad
- Line: Randen Kitano Line
- Platforms: 3
- Tracks: 2

Construction
- Structure type: At-grade

Other information
- Station code: B9

History
- Opened: October 1, 1943
- Former names: Hakubaicho Station (白梅町駅)

Passengers
- FY2015: 1.2 million
Location

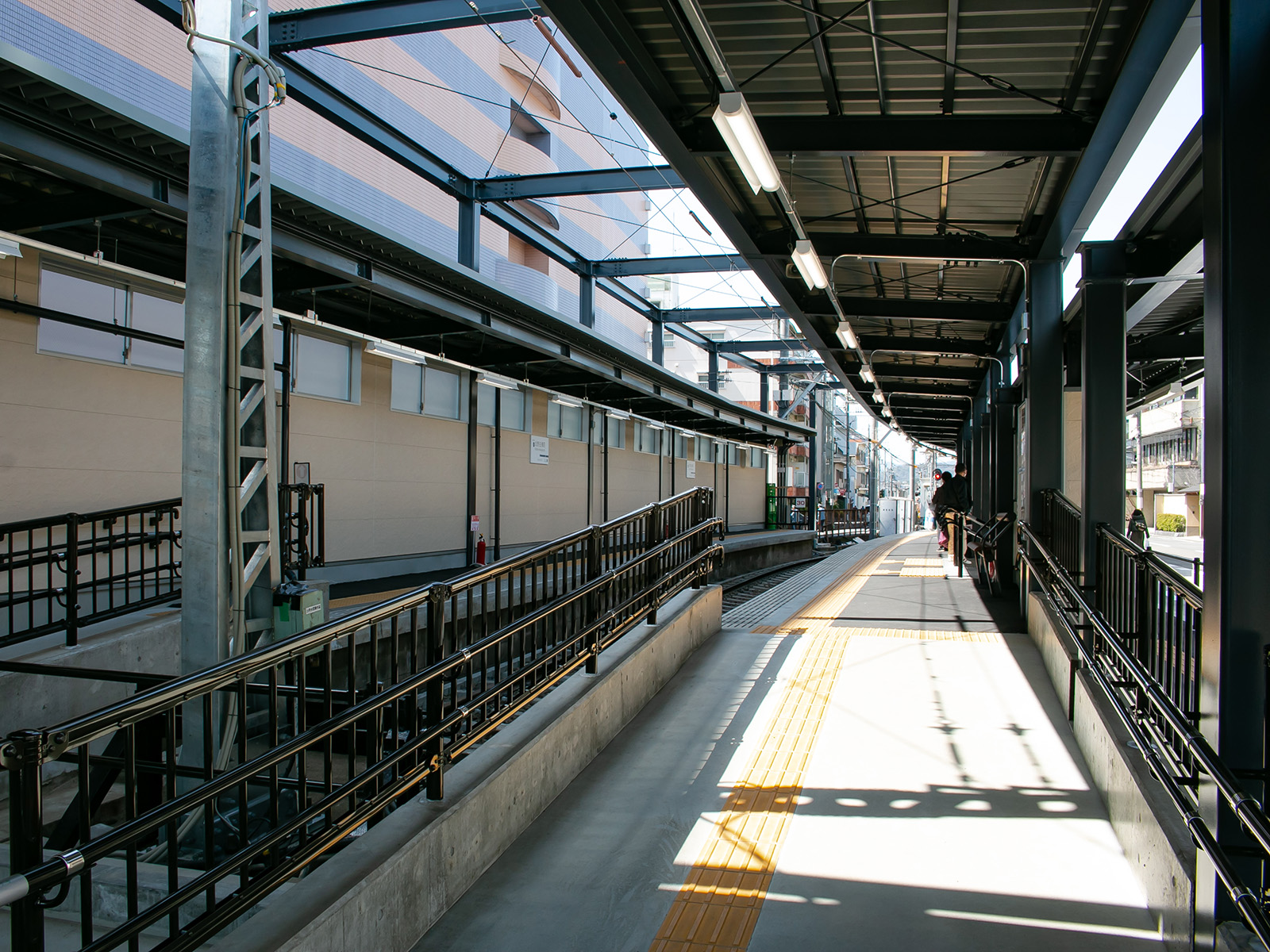
Platforms

Kitano-Hakubaichō Station (北野白梅町駅, Kitano-Hakubaichō-eki) is a station in Kita-ku, Kyoto, Japan, operated by Keifuku Electric Railroad. It has one track, and is the terminal of the Kitano Line.

== History ==
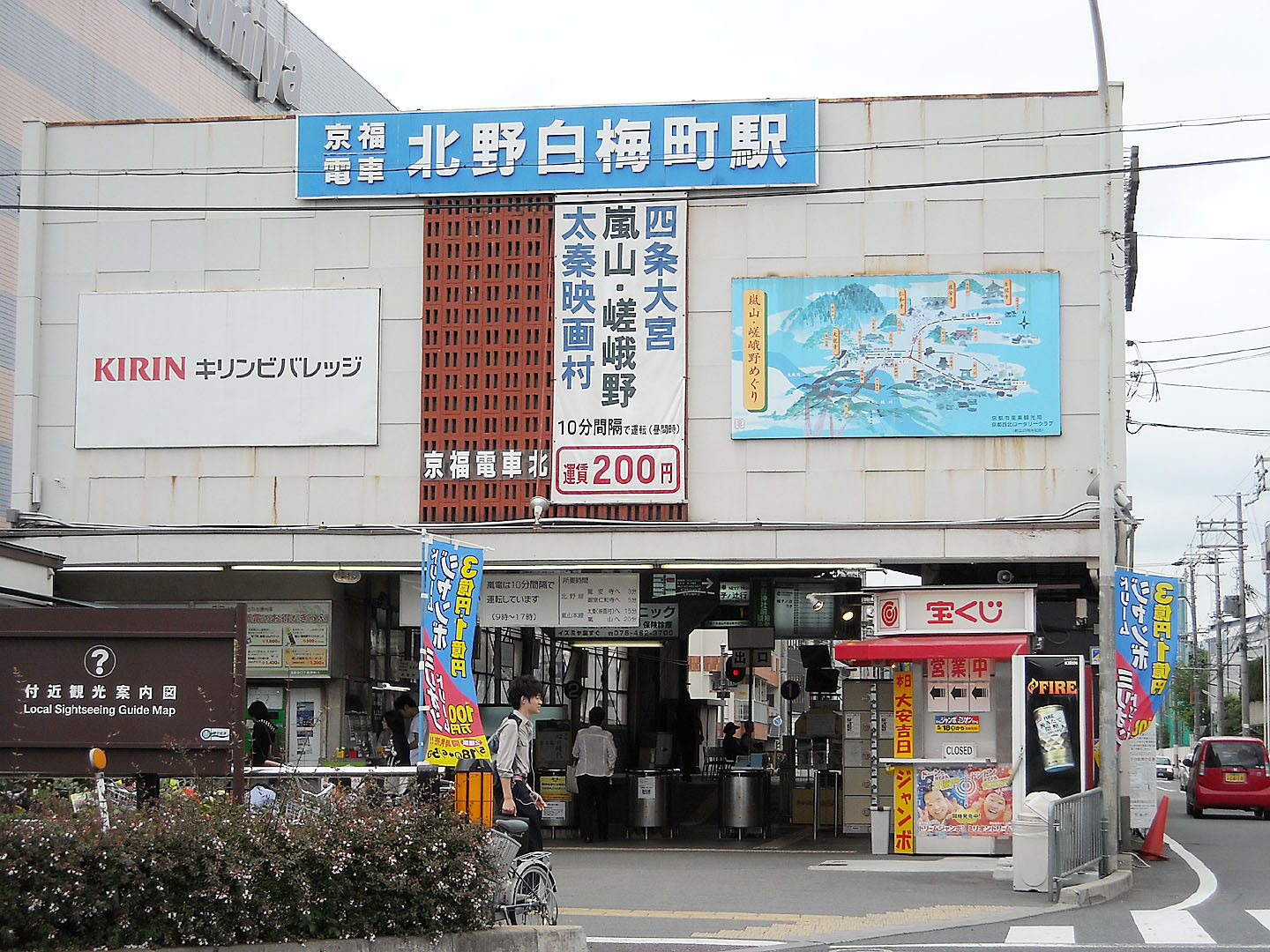
2010

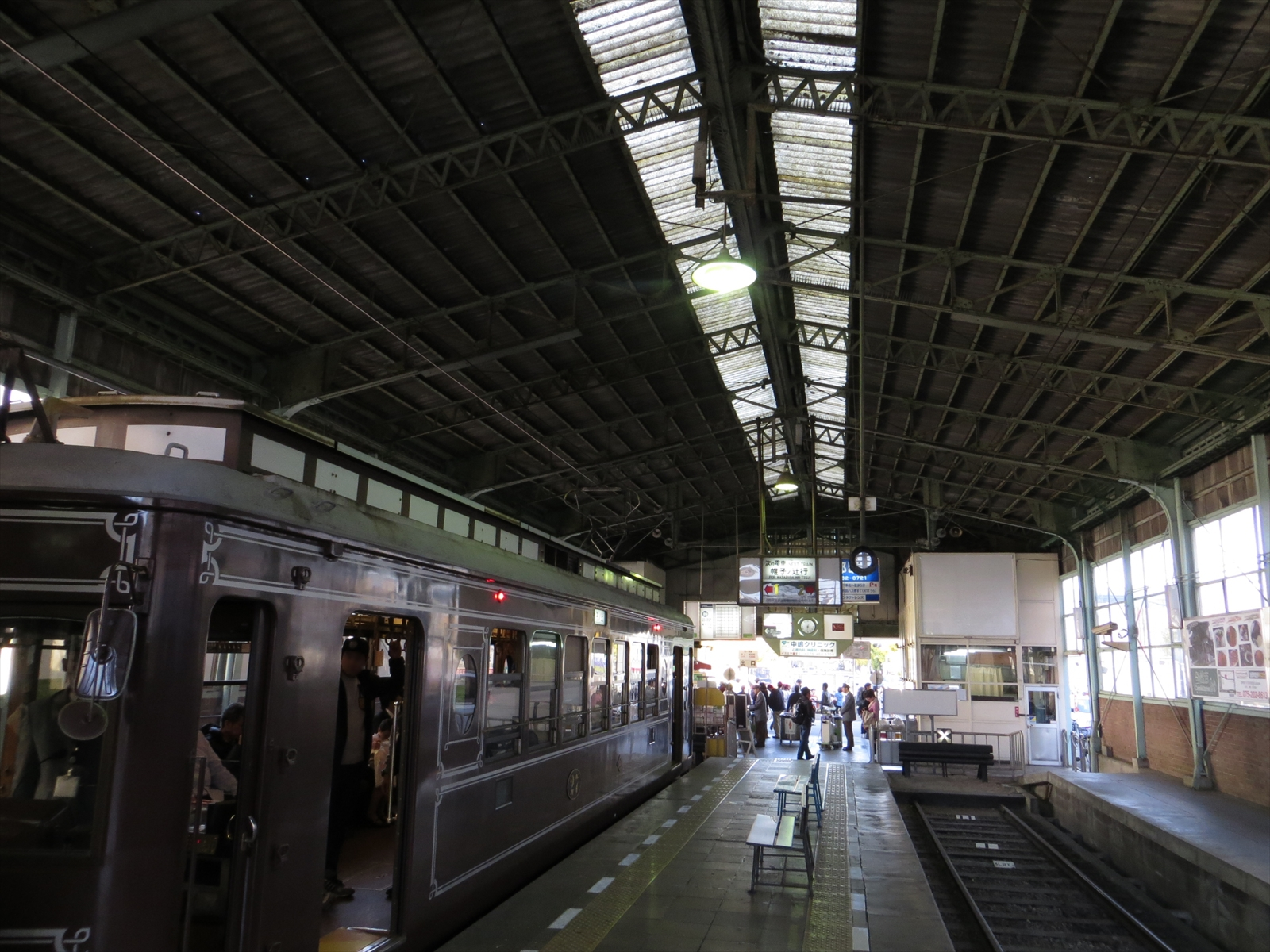
Platforms (2014)

Kitano-Hakubaicho Station began operations on October 1, 1943, under the name Hakubaicho Station. The Randen Kitano Line, which this station serves, opened in 1925 between Takaoguchi Station (the current Utano Station) and Kitano (near Kitano Tenmangu Shrine, no longer in operation). The opening of the Kyoto City Tram Nishioji Line resulted in the construction of Hakubaicho Station to serve as a transfer station. However, when the portion between Kitano and Hakubaicho closed, Hakubaicho station was renamed Kitano-Hakubaicho and from then on served as the terminal station for the Kitano Line. The Nishioji Line closed in 1978 when the city ended all operations of the Kyoto City Tram. The station was renovated from 2019 to 2021 to provide access ramps and integrate it with the bus stop, replacing one of the two tracks.

== Lines ==
Kitano-Hakubaichō Station is served by the Randen Kitano Line. The station also served the Kyoto City Tram Nishioji Line from 1943 to 1978.

== Adjacent stations ==
«	Service	»
Randen Kitano Line
Tōjiin Ritsumeikan University	-	Terminus

The station is staffed from 6am ~ 6pm, and remains unstaffed during the rest of the day.

== Surrounding area ==
- Kitano Tenmangū Shrine
- Hirano Shrine
- Shikichi Shrine (Waratenjin)
- Taishogun-Hachi Shrine
- Rakusei Middle School and High School
