= Hoshino Resorts =

Japan-based resort hotel operator

- Type: Kabushiki Kaisha
- Industry: Hospitality, tourism
- Founded: 1914
- Founder: Kuniji Hoshino
- Headquarters: Hoshino, Karuizawa, Nagano, Japan
- Number of locations: 83
- Area served: Asia
- Key people: Yoshiharu Hoshino
- Number of employees: 5,428
- Website: global.hoshinoresort.com

Hoshino Resort Co., Ltd. (株式会社 星野リゾート, Kabushiki Kaisha Hoshino Risōto) is a Japan-based international operator of ryokan (Japanese inns) and hotels originally established in Karuizawa, Nagano. Founded by Kuniji Hoshino in Karuizawa, Nagano Prefecture, it opened its first hot spring resort in 1914.

Rebranded by Yoshiharu Hoshino in 1995 as Hoshino Resorts, it has expanded across Japan and Asia with a focus on the local charms of each destination and a high level of omotenashi, Japanese-style hospitality. The rebranding supposedly aimed to explore an alternate, modernized Japan, countering the country's gradual Westernization.

Hoshino Resorts has also developed its bridal business through Karuizawa Hotel Bleston Court (formerly Hotel New Hoshino) with the nearby Karuizawa Kogen Church. Noriyuki Hamada, former Executive Chef of Bleston Court Yukawatan restaurant in Karuizawa (currently Head Chef of Ryusen, HOSHINOYA Tokyo restaurant) became the first ever Japanese chef to be recognised at the Bocuse d'Or in January 2013, winning third prize, while former HOSHINOYA Kyoto chef Ichiro Kubota (currently owner and chef of KITCHEN 16) earned a Michelin Star in October 2012.

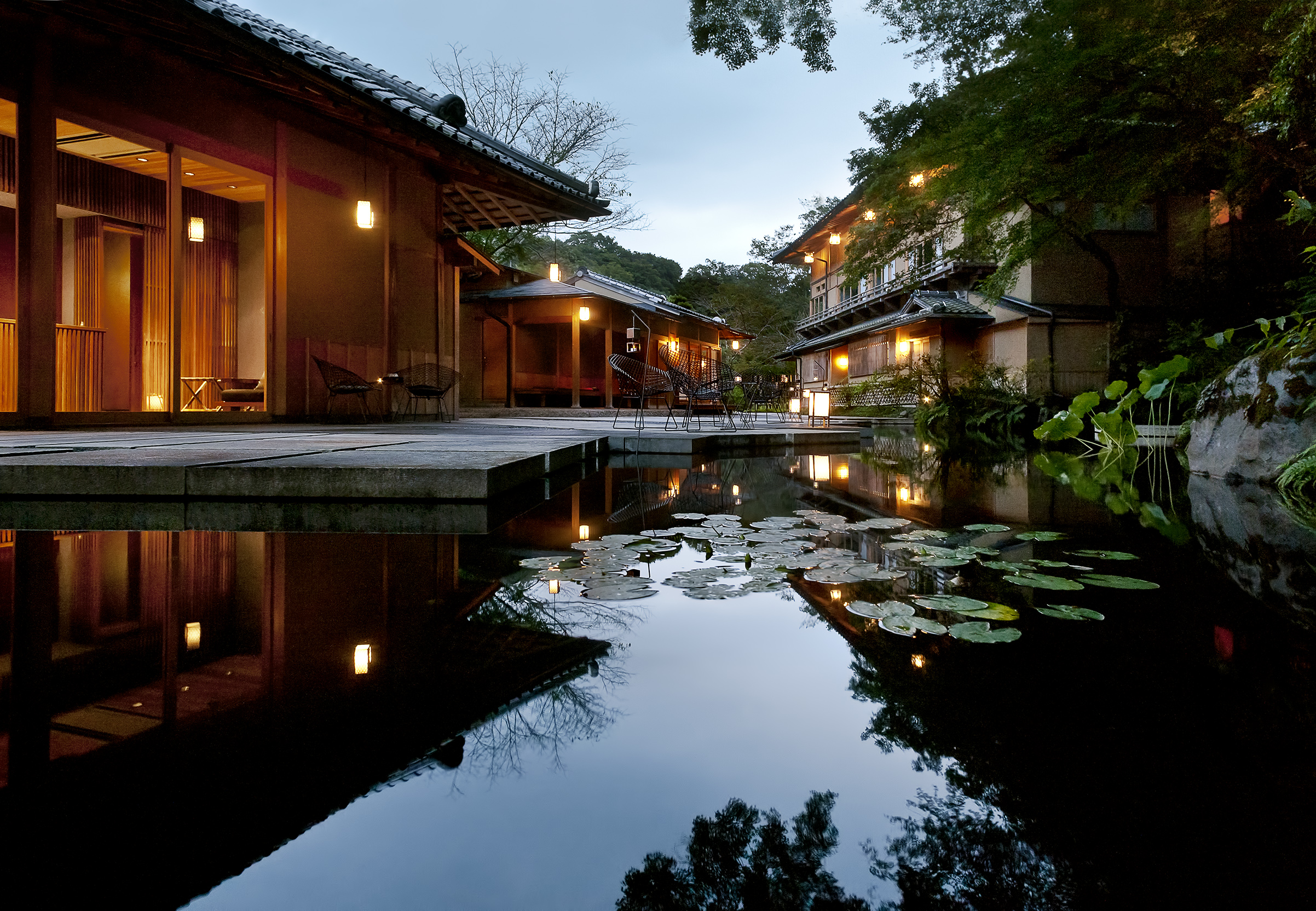
The Water Garden at Hoshinoya Kyoto

== History ==
Hoshino Resorts began life in 1904, as a forestry business in Karuizawa, which had just begun to become popular as a location for holiday villas. Founder Kuniji Hoshino then opened the first Hoshino Onsen Ryokan ten years later in 1914. As natural hot springs were uncovered in the area, Karuizawa became a center for 1920s culture, attracting some of the most notable authors, poets and feminists of the period such as Tōson Shimazaki, Kanzō Uchimura, Akiko Yosano, and Hakushū Kitahara to the "Liberal Education of Art Workshop" held in the area. It began its policy towards energy self-sufficiency as early as 1929, with the opening of its first hydroelectric power plant.

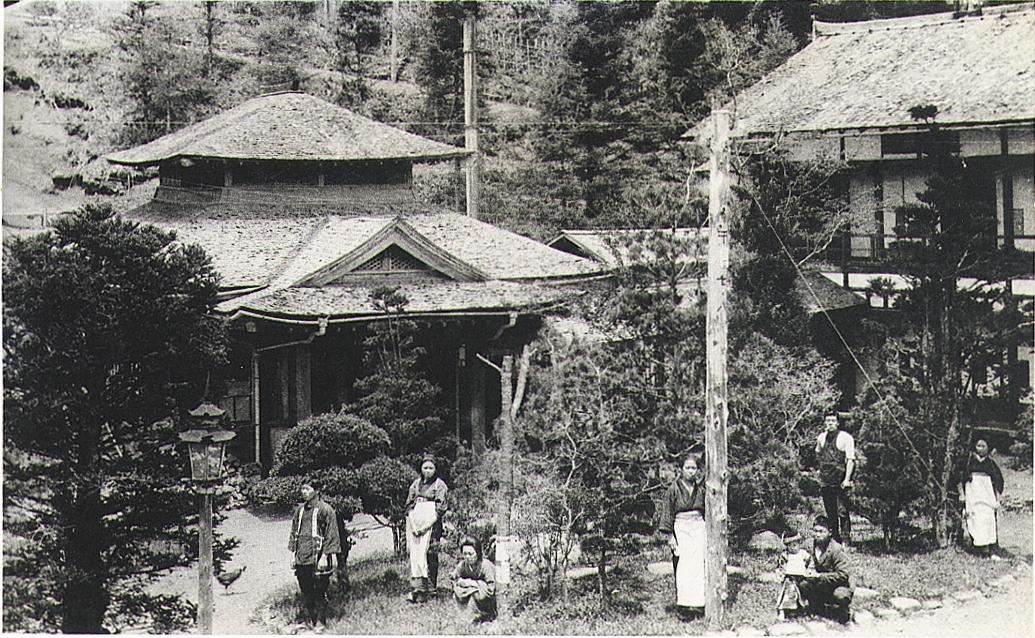
Hoshino Onsen Ryokan c. 1930s

Yoshimasa Hoshino, the second generation heir, was influenced by Showa era poet and ornithologist Godo Nakanishi, who commented that "Until now it has been customary to eat wild birds, but from hereonafter, we will enter a phase in which people will find enjoyment in watching them." Hoshino Onsen Ryokan then began its first guided nature tours, called "Tancho-kai", establishing Japan's first National Wild Bird Forest in 1974 in Karuizawa, and evolving its tours into the 1992 established the Picchio Wildlife Research Center, awarded the first ever "Eco-Tourism" Grand Prize in Japan by the Ministry of Environment on June 5, 2005.

The second half of the 20th century, from the post-war depression through to the increase of international travel, caused a decline in interest in many traditional ryokan. Hoshino Onsen Ryokan rebranded itself as Hoshino Resorts in 1995 when current president, and fourth-generation family member, Yoshiharu Hoshino (星野 佳路, Hoshino Yoshiharu) took the helm. Since 1999, the company has pursued aims to produce zero-emissions resorts, and acquired multiple properties across Japan that had struggled since the 1980s economic bubble burst. It has refurbished, rebranded and incorporated most of its properties into one of its three brands, whilst constructing new properties from scratch in Okinawa and soon in Marunouchi, Tokyo, for its premier Hoshinoya brand.

== Current business activities ==
Hoshino Resorts is currently led by fourth-generation family heir Yoshiharu Hoshino. Born in Karuizawa in 1960, the Keio University graduate went on to Cornell University School of Hotel Administration, obtaining a Masters of Management in Hospitality. Hoshino Resorts operates a total of 83 facilities as of May 2026. He was appointed president of Hoshino Onsen in 1991, but fired six months later when his initial ideas to rejuvenate the business failed. He was recalled in 1995 and has led the company since, further being selected as the first "Charisma of Tourism" by the Ministry of Land, Infrastructure, Transport and Tourism in 2003.

During the initial stages of Yoshiharu Hoshino's management, he first restructured the company, reducing family members on the company board so that more than half would be outsiders brought in on an evaluation system; "The staff worked in poor conditions and the Hoshino family seemed to have special rights," he told the Financial Times. By employing university graduates who themselves can present ideas such as eco-tourism, the company has seen a quick reversal from a period of high staff turnover, to a highly sought after employer with a merit-based remuneration system.

== Yoho Brewing ==
Yoho Brewing, a manufacturer of craft beer with facilities in Saku and Miyota, was established as a subsidiary of Hoshino Resort Company in 1996 by Hoshino Resorts executive Yoshiharu Hoshino. In September 2014, 30% of the company was sold to Kirin Beer in mutual agreement to cooperate in business areas such as shipping, marketing, procurement and product development."

== Brands ==
Hoshino Resorts has developed six separate hospitality brands over the years aimed at different demographics. Hoshino Resorts operates a total of 83 facilities as of May 2026. These include 10 under the Hoshinoya brand, 24 under Kai, 8 under Risonare, 18 under Omo, 4 under Beb, and 1 under Lucy, as well as 9 standalone lodging facilities, 3 ski resorts, and 6 other facilities primarily intended for day trips.

=== Hoshinoya ===
Hoshinoya (星のや) is Hoshino Resort's flagship brand. Currently, there are 10 properties, including the original Hoshinoya Karuizawa that opened in 1914. Hoshinoya Kyoto opened in Arashiyama in 2009. Hoshinoya Taketomi, the first and currently only resort in Taketomi Island, opened in 2012, followed by Hoshinoya Fuji, which promotes itself to be the chain's first glamping resort, in Fujikawaguchiko in 2015. Hoshinoya Tokyo, the first property to be constructed inside a major city, is located in downtown Marunouchi, and was opened in 2016 after a three-year-long construction. Hoshinoya Bali, the chain's first property outside Japan, opened in the Indonesian island of Bali in 2017, followed two years later by Hoshinoya Guguan in Taiwan's Guguan hot springs. Hoshinoya Okinawa, the chain's second location in Okinawa Prefecture, opened in Okinawa Island in 2022.

Hoshinoya Karuizawa and Kyoto have both been members of the Small Luxury Hotels of the World (SLH) group since December 2009.

=== Kai ===
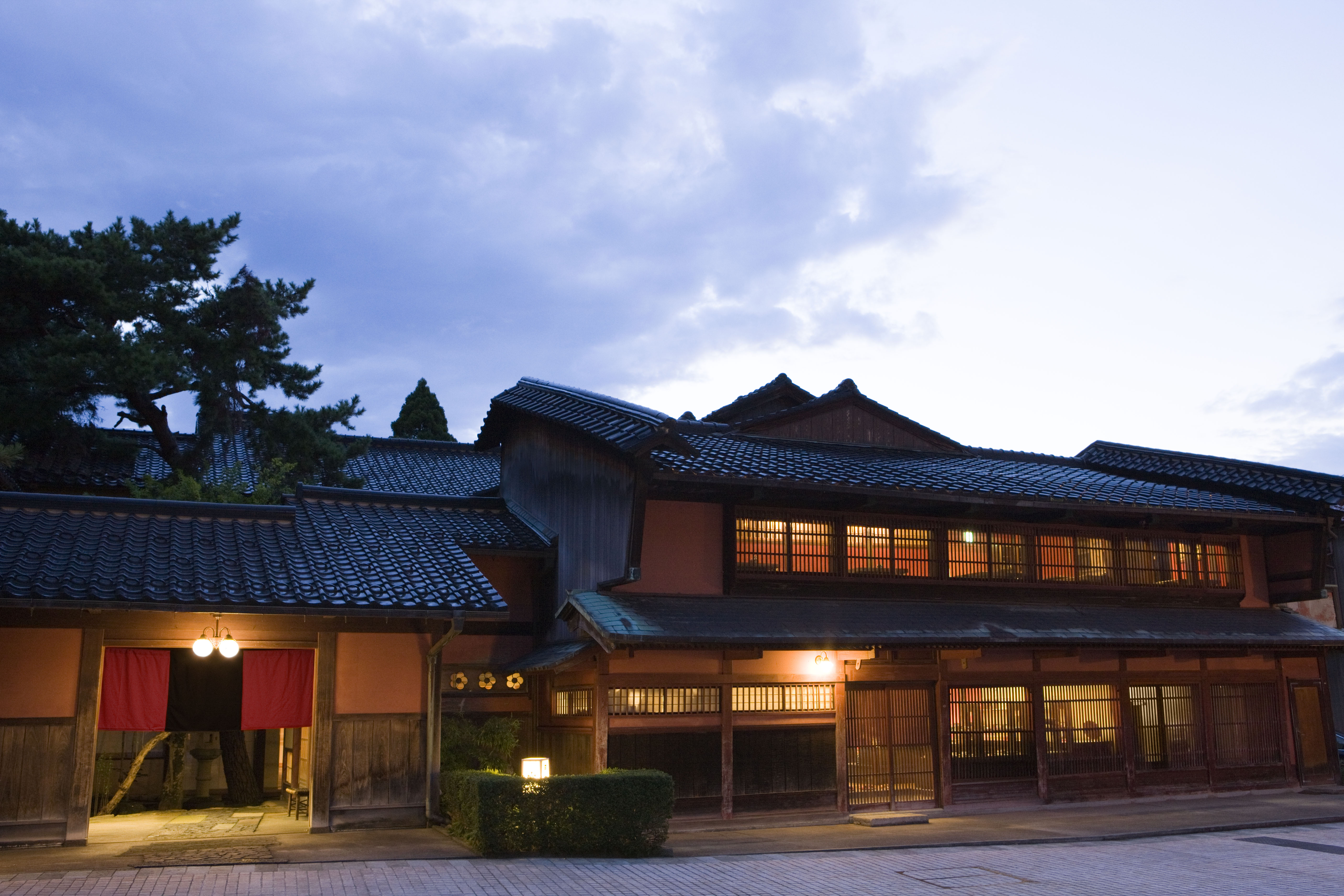
Kai Kaga, originally built in the early 17th century

Kai (界) is a chain of authentic onsen, natural hot spring resorts with a style of traditional Japan which serve kaiseki cuisine featuring local ingredients in each property. Targeted towards couples and women, it currently operates 24 resorts throughout Japan, including places such as Aso, Atami, Kaga, Hakone, Itō, Izumo, Matsumoto, Tsugaru, and the Tateyama Kurobe Alpine Route. The brand was launched in 2011.

Kai Kaga is typical of the Hoshino Resort strategy of finding existing properties and refurbishing them in traditional style with modern design elements. Originally built in the 1630s, the ryokan faces a restored communal bathhouse known as Kosoyu, and has undergone renovation since being acquired.

Kai Hakone, built in 1987 and acquired in 2012, combines paper screens and tatami mats in its rooms with modern sofas and kakejiku by Gallery Tsuyuki. It also provides performances of Kamishibai, folk tales about yosegi-kaizu told using paper scrolls.

=== Risonare ===
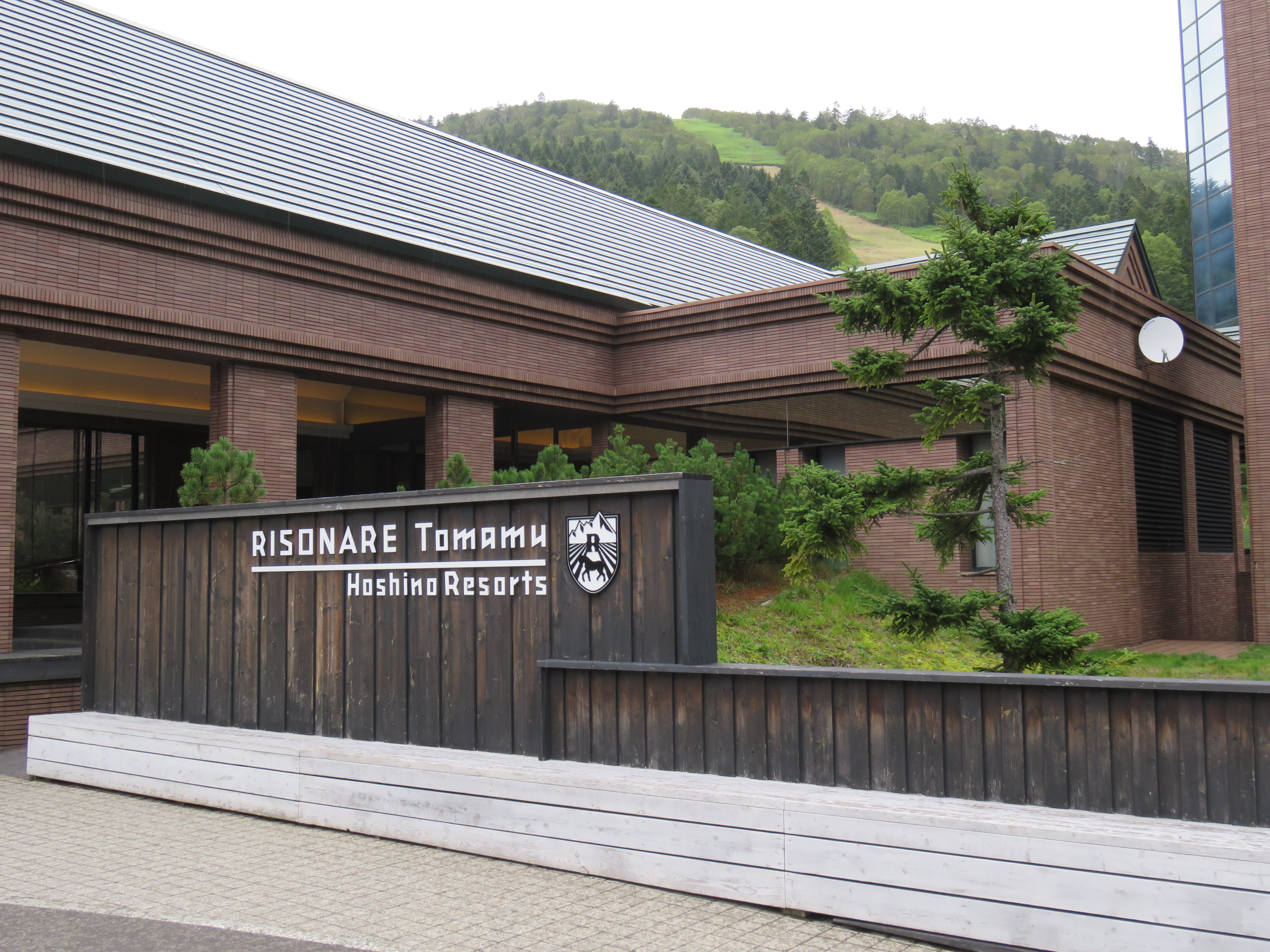
Risonare Tomamu in Central Hokkaido

Risonare (リゾナーレ) is Hoshino Resorts' modern accommodation, designed for families, and often offering a range of sports activities. There are currently 8 Risonare properties, one of which is located in the United States territory of Guam. Properties include Risonare Tomamu, which offers skiing in central Hokkaido; Risonare Kohamajima, which offers golf and windsurfing in southern Okinawa; Risonare Yatsugatake, located in a wine region in central Honshu; and Risonare Atami, a seaside hot-spring resort south of Tokyo. Italian, French, and Japanese cuisine are featured in many Risonare resorts, though vegan diners are also available.

=== Omo ===
Omo (おも) is an urban city center hotel brand designed as a base for exploring. There are currently 18 Omo properties. The brand was launched in 2018.

=== Beb ===
Beb (ベブ) is a hotel brand designed for staycations, with rooms and lounge areas built to accommodate multiple family groups. There are currently 4 Beb properties.

=== Lucy ===
Lucy (ルーシー) is a brand established to provide comfortable lodging experiences in mountainous areas where such accommodation had traditionally been difficult to offer. Its buildings are of a cabin type, and, compared with the company's other five brands, its accommodation rates are set at the lowest level.

== Notable Hoshinoya Hotels ==
=== Hoshinoya Karuizawa ===
Hoshino Resorts' original property is located in Karuizawa, an area of Nagano Prefecture, under Mount Asama, first deemed fit as a resort and villa spot in the late 19th century by foreign missionaries like British/Canadian theologian Alexander Croft Shaw in (1886). Emperor Akihito met his wife Michiko in the area, and it is the only place in the world to have hosted both summer and winter Olympic events. Hoshinoya Karuizawa is located on the banks of the Yukawa river.

First opened in 1914, it was closed in 1995 for ten years by Yoshiharu Hoshino, before being reopened as Hoshinoya Karuizawa in 2005, the first eco-resort in Japan. The resort and its 'Tombo-no-yu' hot springs are powered by geothermal heat from the volcanos in the surrounding topography. This, as well as hydroelectricity from mountain streams, provides the energy for the rest of the resort's power. The property is Hoshino's first to achieve the policy aim of zero-emissions.

The property has 77 rooms, two hot-spring baths and a chaya tea room.

=== Hoshinoya Kyoto ===
The second Hoshinoya, opened in 2009, is the former home of wealthy merchant Ryoi Suminokura (1554–1614). Suminokura is remembered mostly for creating the Takase River canal that runs through Kyoto, completed in 1611 and allowing goods to be transported to the then capital. His secluded home was constructed on the banks of the Ōi River in the forests of Arashiyama, famed for its bamboo.

The "riverside sanctuary" is reached by a small private wooden boat ride of ten minutes and retains its 19th-century wood-framed buildings, with 25 tatami-mat rooms, a library, and two gardens. Temple bells ring upon the arrival of each guest, and its moss-traced stone walkways are lit by iron lanterns.

The rooms have been noted for both their natural location, visited by wild monkeys, surrounded by cherry trees, and bathed in natural light, but also for their traditional style, with hinoki cypress wood furo bathtubs, heated chestnut-wood floors, and wallpaper made by Kyoto craftsmen from hand-printed woodblocks (karakami).

The kaiseki restaurant, run by Executive Chef Ichiro Kubota and focusing on local, seasonal and sustainable ingredients, was awarded a Michelin Star in October 2012. Kubota previously held a Michelin Star as head chef of London's Umu restaurant.

=== Hoshinoya Taketomi Island ===
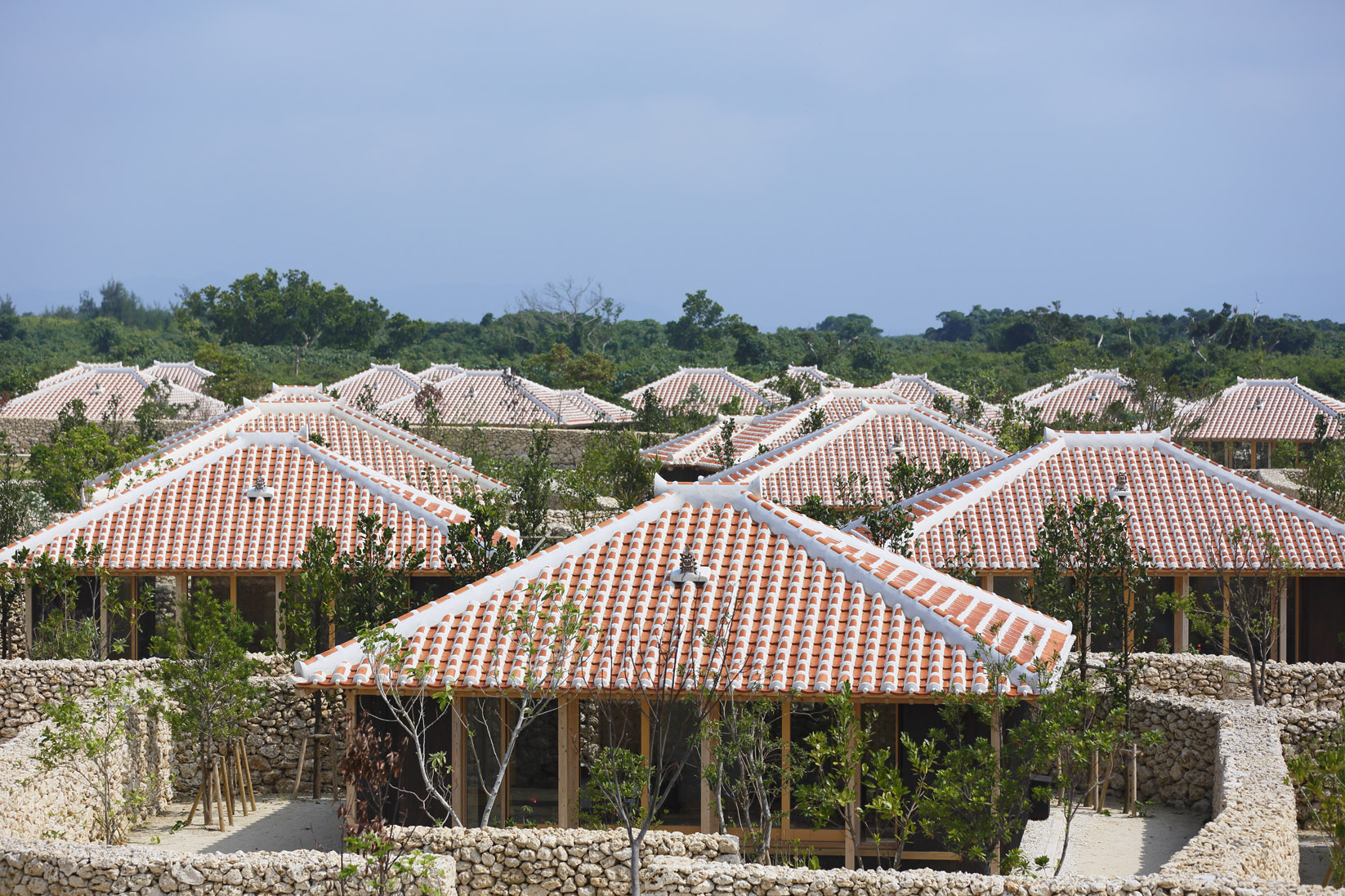
Traditional style villas of Hoshinoya Taketomijima on Taketomi Island

Opened in 2012, Hoshinoya Taketomi Island is the only resort on the island of Taketomi Island (part of the Yaeyama Islands group), a 2.4 square mile island with 342 inhabitants, 1,200 miles southwest of Tokyo. One of the last vestiges of the former Ryukyu Kingdom to retain its long-held identity, local village chiefs approval was needed before the complex could be built. When it was, it was under strict rules to respect the architectural style of the island, with only single-tier structures eventually approved and constructed.

The property consists of 48 wood-structure villas arranged as a mini-village with stone walls, prominent Shisa displayed upon rooftops, and a lobby live-house where locals perform music on traditional sanshin. It was selected for three awards in the May 2013 edition of the Conde Nast Traveler "Best New Hotels in the World"; "Best New Hotels to Splurge On", "World's Most Romantic New Hotels", and "Amazing Pools at the Best New Hotels".

=== Hoshinoya Fuji ===
Hoshinoya Fuji, named by Hoshinoya resorts and Forbes Travel Guide as a "glamping on a hill" resort opened on 31 October 2015.

== Awards ==
- Eco-Tourism Grand Prize 2005 – Picchio Wildlife Research Center, awarded by the Ministry of Environment
- Michelin Star 2012 – Ichiro Kubota, Executive Chef of Hoshinoya Kyoto
- Bocuse d'Or 2013 (Bronze) – Noriyuki Hamada, Executive Chef of Bleston Court Yukawatan, Karuizawa

== See also ==
- Ryokan (Japanese inn)
