= Nishikikōji Street =

Street in Kyoto city, Japan

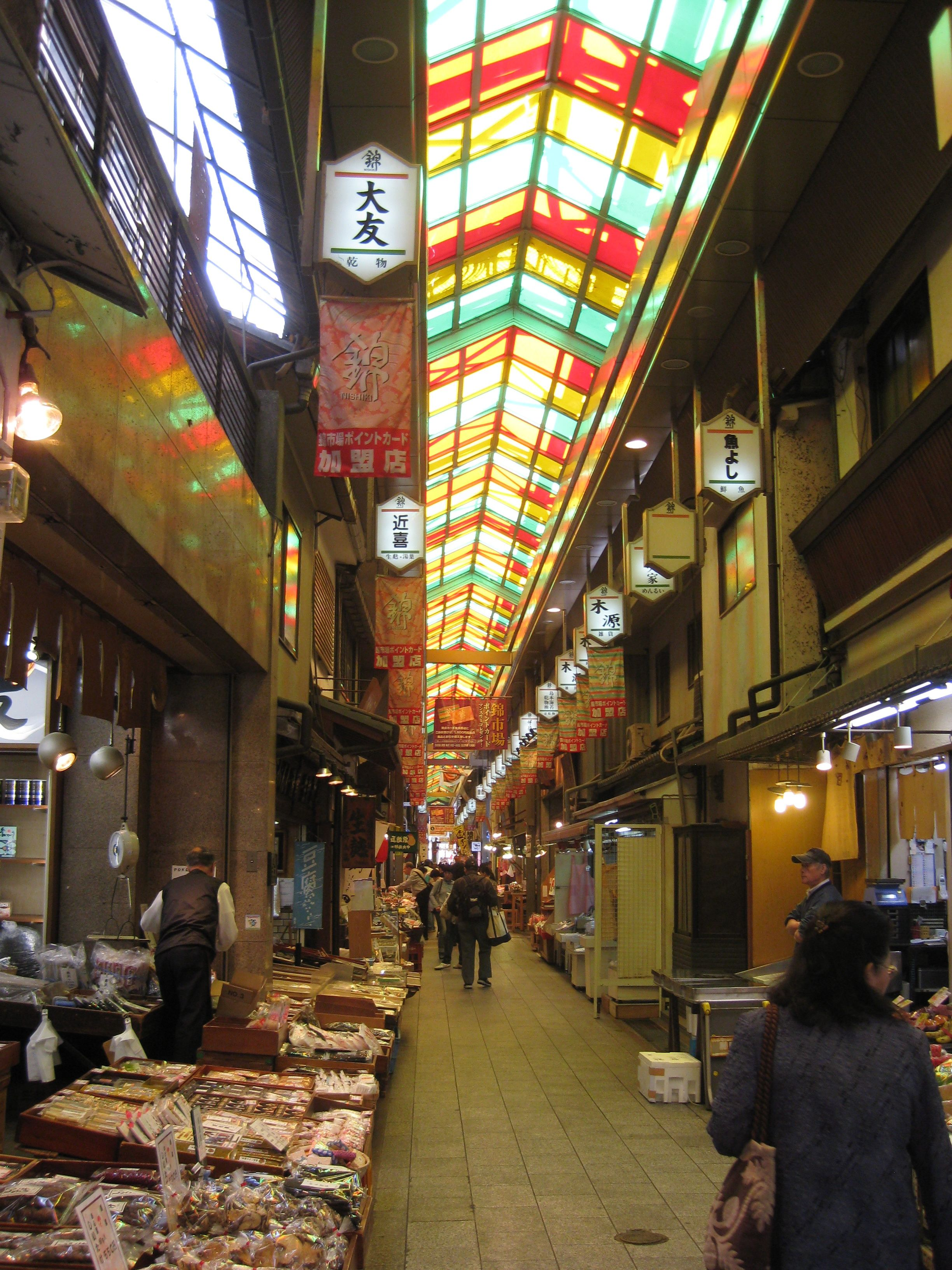
Nishiki Market.

Nishikikōji Street (錦小路通 にしきこうじどおり Nishikikōji dōri) is a street that crosses the center of the city of Kyoto from east to west, running from Shinkyōgoku Street (east) to Mibugawa Street (west). The famous Nishiki Market is located on the east section of the street.

== History ==
During the Heian period, the street was called Gusokukōji and was 12 meters wide. Later its name was changed to Sokōji, until Emperor Murakami ordered its name to be changed to its current denomination of Nishikikōji.

=== Nishiki Market ===
According to records, fish was being sold at the location as early as the year 792 and the place received official permission from the government to operate as a fish market after 1615.

== Present Day ==
Nowadays the street is located between Takoyakushi Street (north) and Shijō street (south).

The section between Teramachi Street (east) and Takakura Street (west) is occupied by the Nishiki Market, a popular shopping and tourist destination among locals and visitors.

== Relevant Landmarks Along the Street ==
- Nishiki Market
- Nishiki Tenmangū
- Teramachi Street
- Shinkyōgoku Street
