= Picchio =

Picchio ("woodpecker" in Italian) may refer to:

- Procaer Picchio
- Picchio Racing Cars

== People with the surname ==
- Ana María Picchio (born 1946), Argentine actress

== People with the nickname ==
- Giancarlo De Sisti (born 1943), Italian footballer and manager

== Organizations ==
- Picchio Wildlife Research Center, Wildlife research, conservation, and ecotourism organization based in Japan
