= Kiyamachi Street =

Street in Kyoto, Japan

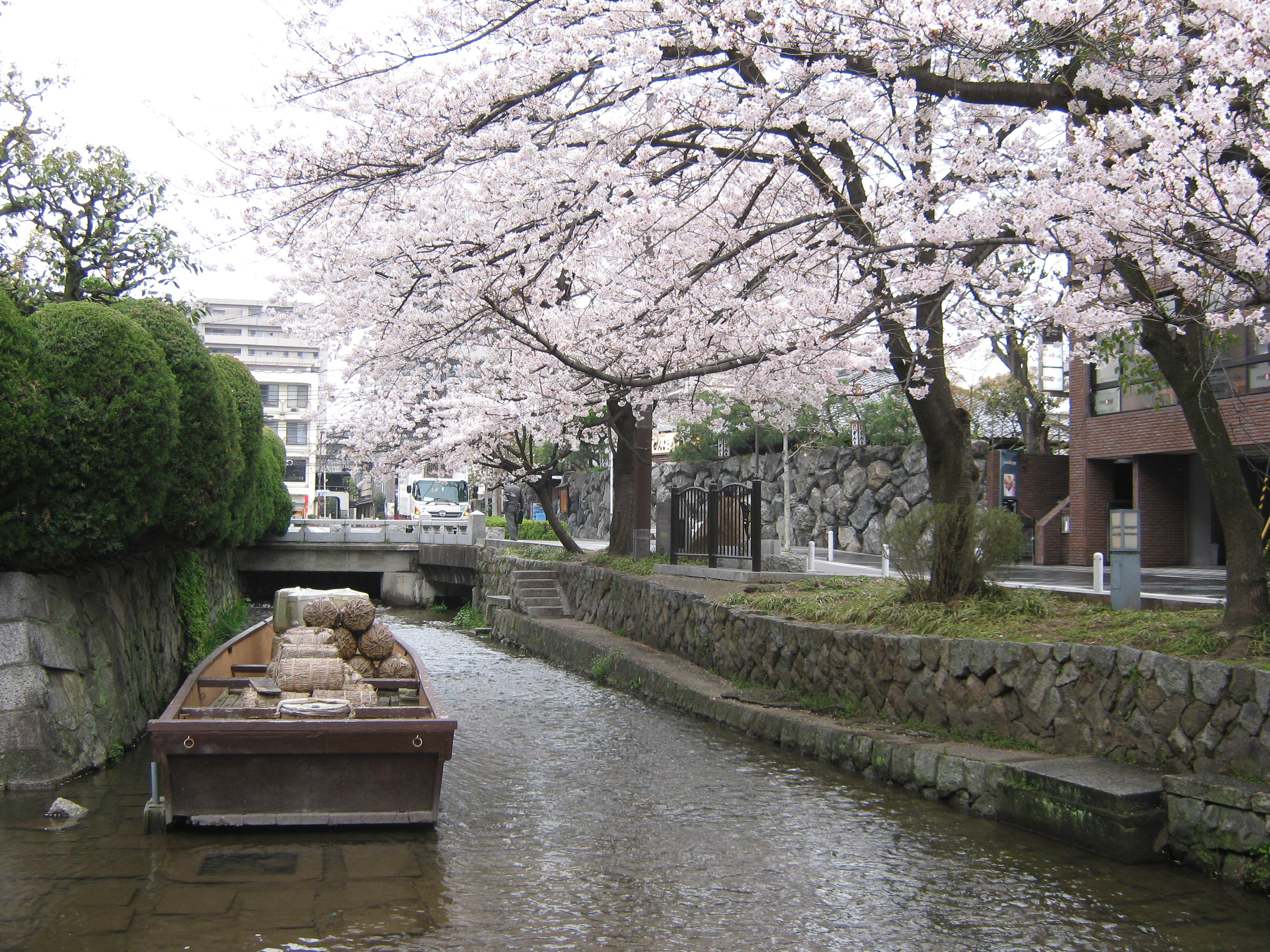
Kiyamachi Street and Takase River

Kiyamachi Street (木屋町通, Kiyamachidōri) is a historical street in Kyoto, Japan, running north–south. It runs between Kiyamachi Nijō and Kiyamachi Shichijō on the eastern side of the Takase River near the Kamo River. There also runs Nishi-Kiyamachi Street on the western side of Takase River between Sanjō and Shichijō. It was constructed with the excavation of Takase River in the Edo period. Kiya is an old Japanese word which means woods stores. In 1895 a tram started to run between Kiyamachi Nijō and Kiyamachi Gojō. The tram line was moved to Kawaramachi Street in 1920s.

== History ==
Ryoui Suminokura began his excavation of Takase River at Nijoukirimachi (present day Kamikorikichou) in 1611 during the Keichou Era (1596 - 1615). At the time, the road was called Korikichou Street.

At the beginning of the Edo period, charcoal and lumber from Osaka and Kyoto were loaded on boats and brought to the area to be put in storehouses, which lined the river. Thus the area was called Kiyamachi. Zaimokumachi, Kamiyamachi, Nabeyamachi, Komeyamachi, and other towns still remain in the area around Kiyamachi, each of which was named for the products they dealt in. According to topographical records in 1762 of the Houreki era, the area from Kitanijou Street to Minamigojou was defined as Kiyamachi.

In the middle of the Edo era in the 18th century, because of an influx of travellers and merchants in the area, the appearance of the street changed and restaurants, inns, and bars were established. At the end of the Edo era, the town served as a secret meeting place for loyalists of the emperor such as Ryouma Sakamoto, Takayoshi Kido, Masujirou Oomura, Seiishiro Honma, and Shouzan Sakuma. Monuments were placed in the downtown area to commemorate these loyalists.

In 1895 of the Meiji period, a street car line was built which ran from Nijou to Gojou. In the 1920s, due to the expansion of Kawaramachi Street, it became known as the Kawaramachi Line.

== Current State ==
Cherry blossom trees have been planted along the river and a sidewalk has been laid along the street. Further improvements are being made to the road.

Around Sanjou Street and Shijou Street, there are tea and coffee shops, bars, and restaurants offering not only Japanese food but food from various countries. Because of the increase in entertainment, measures are being taken to maintain public order.

As of 2003, the district of Kiyamachi has been designated a beautifully developed community of importance in Kyoto.
