= Aritsugu =

Japanese knife and cooking utensil producer and store

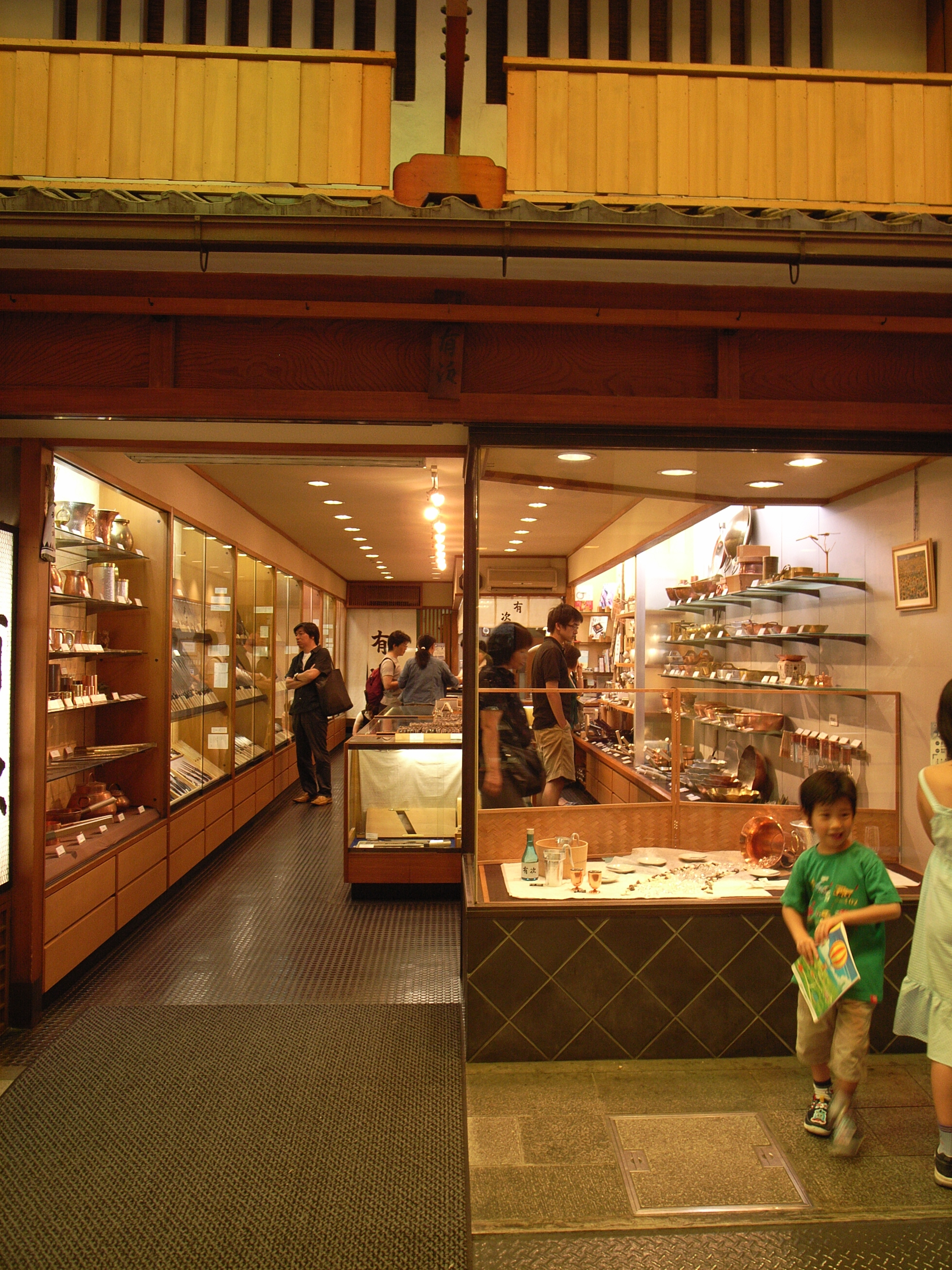
Aritsugu store in Nishiki Market, Kyoto, Japan

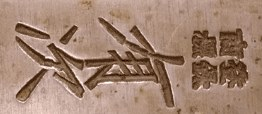
Identifying text on an Aritsugu blade

Aritsugu is a Japanese knife and cooking utensil producer and store, founded by Fujiwara Aritsugu in 1560. It is one of the oldest knifemakers in Japan and one of the oldest companies in the World.

Aritsugu was involved in the production of swords and was appointed a supplier for the Imperial House of Japan, before the requirement for new blades diminished due to a more peaceful era emerging through the influence of the Tokugawa shogunate during the Edo period in the 17th and 18th centuries. During this period Aritsugu switched its primary production from swords to the pointed knives that were used to carve statues of Buddha. In the late 19th century Meiji period, there was strong growth in demand for kitchen knives and cooking utensils developing in Japan because of stable government and improved living conditions. Aritsugu used its experience in blade production to focus on this emerging market.

The current proprietor of Aritsugu is Shinichiro Terakubo, who took over from his father in 1956 when Shinichiro was 17 years of age. He is the 18th generation to be involved in the running of the store since its inception. Shinichiro teaches cooking, knife sharpening and use classes through the store.

The main store has been located at the Nishiki Market in Kyoto since it moved in 1781 from Sakaimachi Street, where the shop was located for almost 200 years and where the company's offices are still based.
