= Nishiki Market =

Marketplace in downtown Kyoto, Japan

Coordinates: 35°0′18.1″N 135°45′58.1″E

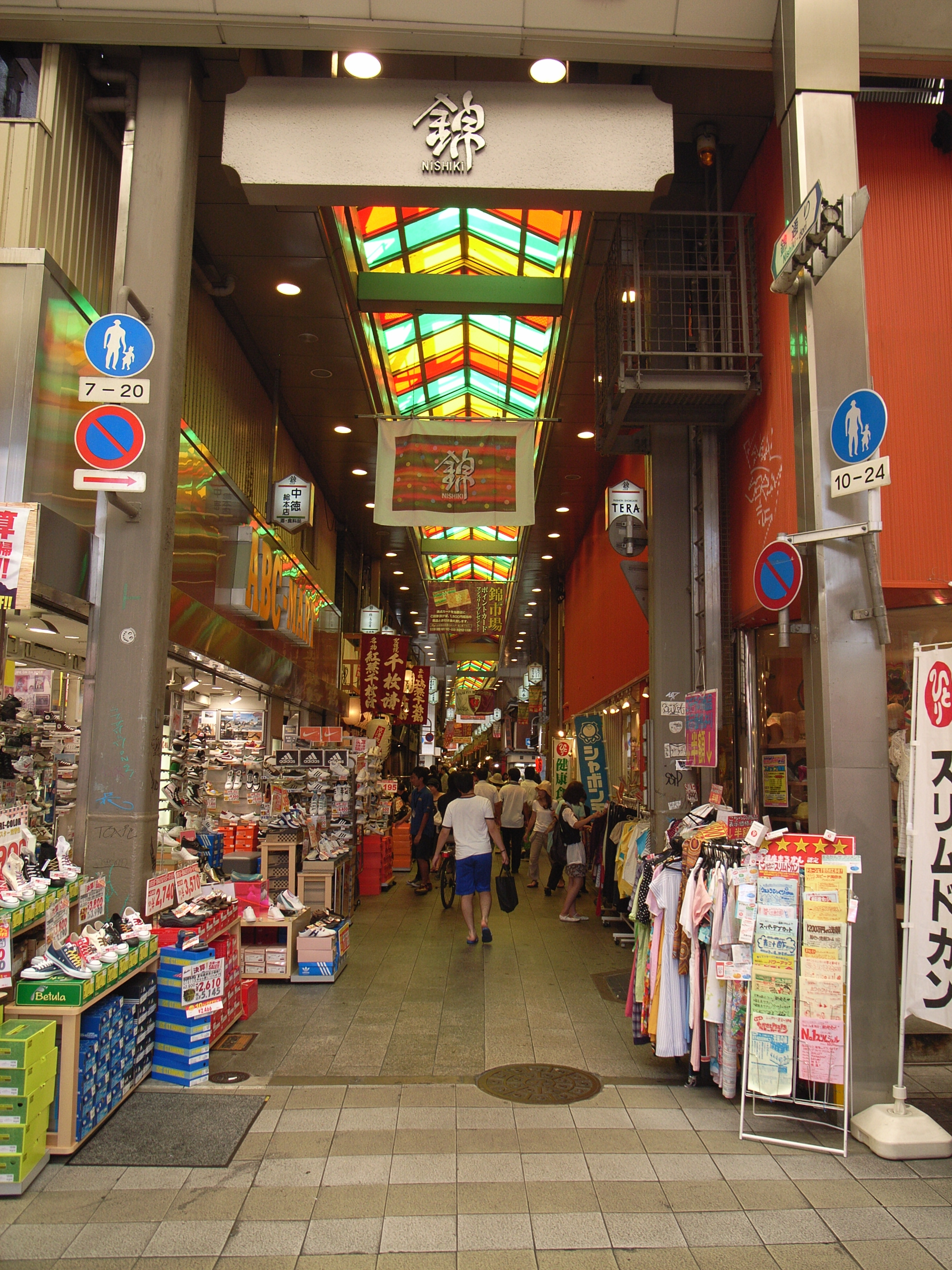
A gate to the market

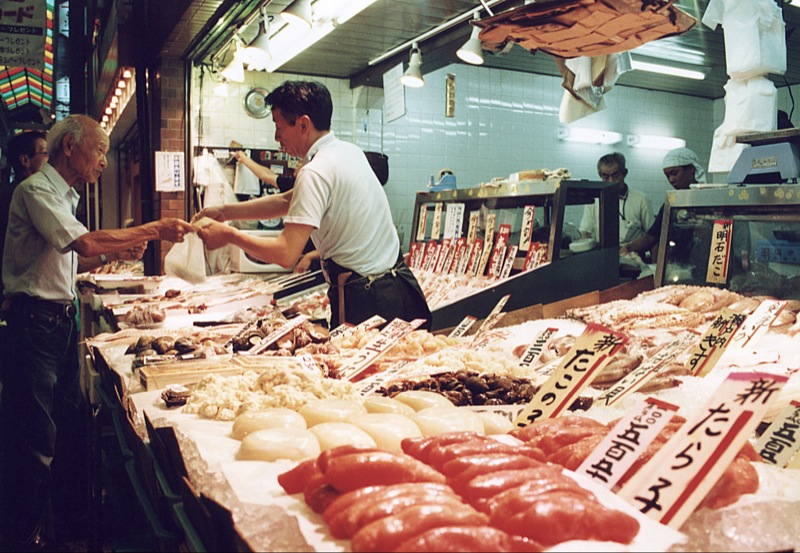
Fish sale

Nishiki Market in December, 2022

Nishiki Market (錦市場, Nishiki Ichiba; literally "brocade market") is a marketplace in downtown Kyoto, located on the east end of Nishikikōji Street, one block north and parallel to Shijō Street (四条通, Shijō-dōri) and west of Teramachi Street (寺町通, Teramachi-dōri). Rich with history and tradition, the market is renowned as the place to obtain many of Kyoto's famous foods and goods.

== History ==
As early as the year 782 the sale of fish started in the area, thanks to the cold groundwater available at the site, which made possible to keep fish and other meats fresh in a location close to the Kyoto Imperial Palace.

In 1615, for the first time the place officially received official permission from the Bakufu government to conduct the sale of fish, being this the first step for becoming a renowned market it is today.

In 1883, after the Meiji Restoration, due to the strong competition between establishments the number of shops was reduced to only 7.

In 1911, a new association promoting the market as a place for the sale of fish and seafood. As a result, the market saw a renewed vitality.

In 1927, the Central Wholesale Market of Kyoto opened and many stores moved there from the Nishiki Market.

In 1928, a new association promoted the opening of shops offering fruits, vegetables, meats and other food products. This marks the point from where the market began to be known as “Kyoto’s kitchen”.

In 1984, the current cobblestone floor was installed and in 1993 the current arcade canopy was installed.

In the year 2005 “Nishiki Market” was registered as a trademark.

== Present Day ==
Nowadays, the market continues to be located on Nishikikōji Street, running for approximately 400m between Takakura Street and Teramachi Street, as a narrow shopping arcade paved with cobblestone. The market is often called “Kyoto’s kitchen” for its abundance of shops (about 130) offering fruits, vegetables, fish, dry foods and more.

Many vendors at Nishiki Market practice sustainable methods by reducing plastic use and incorporating biodegradable packaging, aligning with Kyoto's broader efforts toward environmental preservation.

== Shops ==
- Aritsugu is famous for its hand-crafted knives. It was founded by Aritsugu Fujiwara, a master swordsmith, in 1560.
- Daiyasu 大安 (daiysu) is known for their raw oysters.
- Nishiki Takakuraya, seller of Kyoto-style Tsukemono.
- Nishikikōji Maruki, traditional restaurant offering dishes such as Oyakodon and Nishin Soba.
- Mori, seller of Kyoyasai.
- Masugo Higashiten, seller of Kyoyasai, vegetables and Kyoto-style Tsukemono.
- Touan Nishikikōjiten, seller of Kyō ware.
- Uchida Tsukemono, seller of Tsukemono.
- Tsunori, a fresh fish and charcoal grill shop open since the late Edo period
