= Sanjō Street =

Street in Kyoto, Japan

Sanjō Street（三条通 さんじょうどおり sanjō dōri）is a major street that crosses the center of the city of Kyoto from east to west, running from Shinomiya in the Yamashina-ku ward (east) to the vicinity of the Tenryū-ji in Arashiyama (west).

== History ==
The street corresponds to the Sanjō Ōji street of the Heian-kyō, being at that time 30 meters wide. During the Muromachi period the Sanjō Bridge was constructed in order to facilitate the crossing of military horses. During the Edo period the Sanjō Bridge became the final point of the 53 stations of the Tōkaidō, being separated from Edo by a distance of 490 km. After the Meiji period several western style buildings were constructed along the street, many remaining to this day.

== Present Day ==
Nowadays the street is a popular destination for both locals and visitors, as it hosts a large number of stores, shops, cafes and restaurants, as well as many historical buildings. It is also part of the route of the Kankō-sai procession part of the Gion Matsuri, held the 24th of July every year.

== Relevant landmarks along the street ==
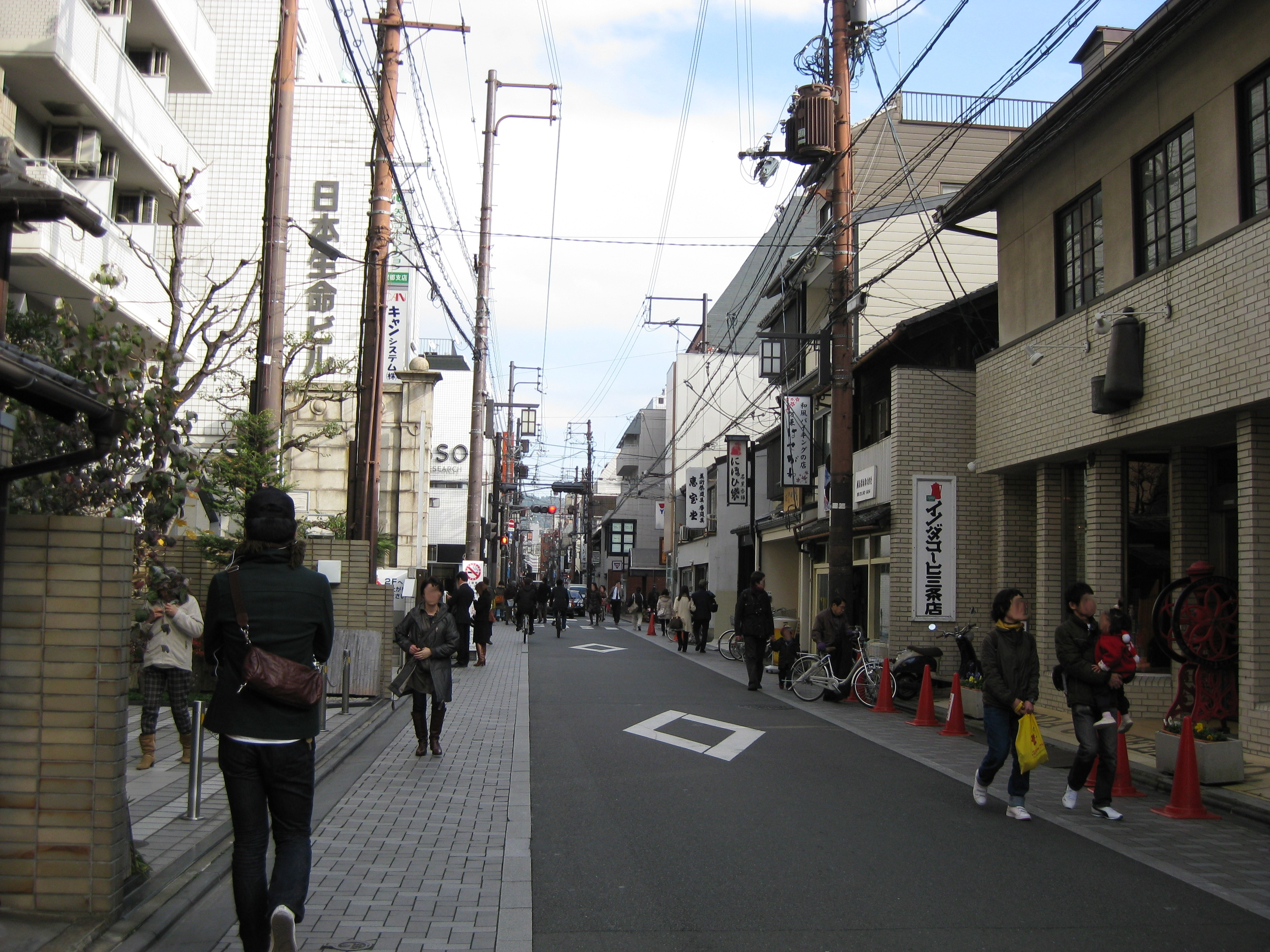
- Sanjō Street in downtown Kyoto.
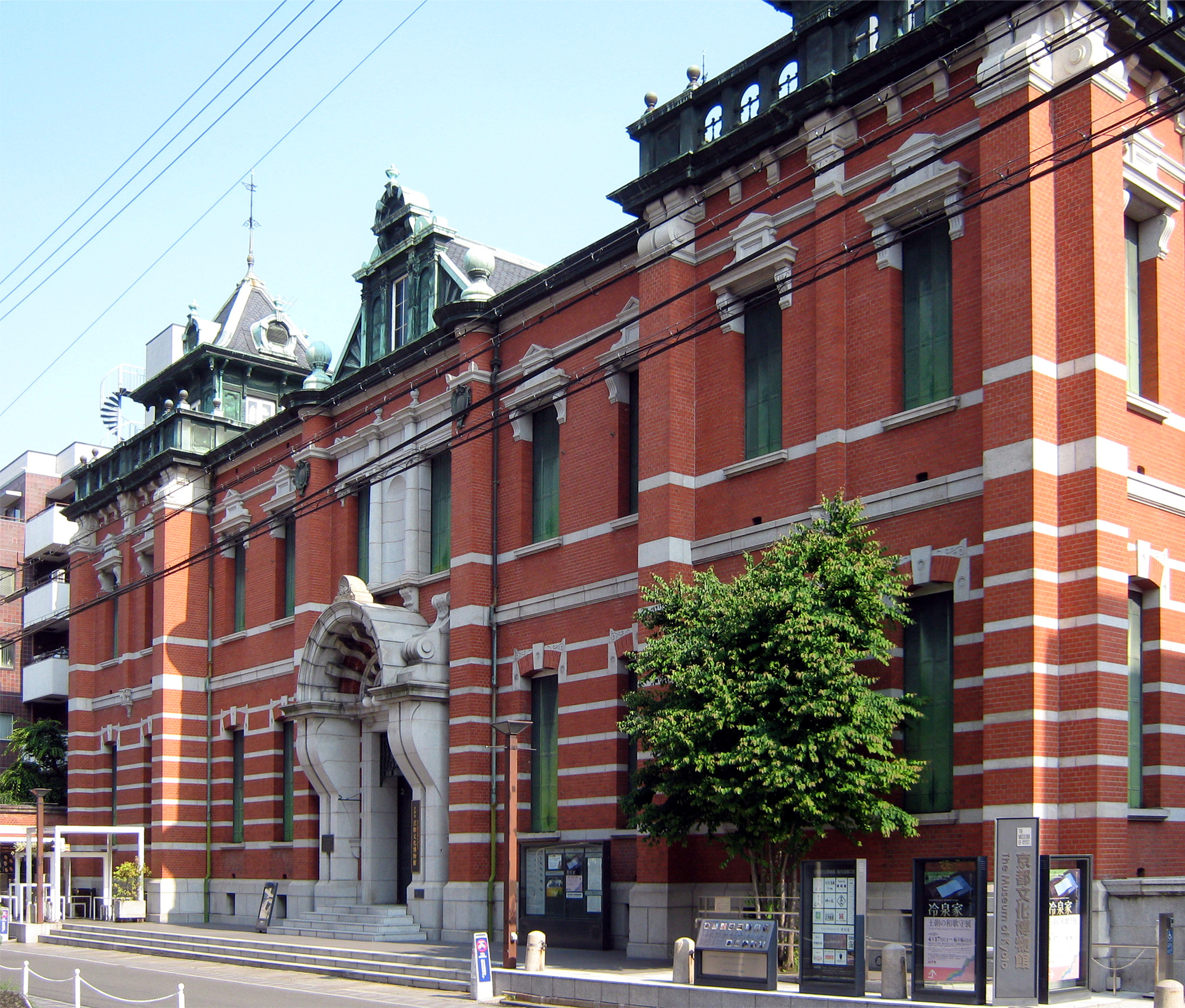
  Former Kyoto office of the Bank of Japan.
  Lake Biwa Canal
- Keage Incline
- Nanzen-ji temple
- Sanjo-ohashi Bridge
- Kamo River
- St. Francis Xavier Cathedral, Kyoto
- Shikyōgoku Street
- Teramachi Street
- Art Complex Building (1928), currently GEAR (theatre show) venue
- Niwaka Building by Ando Tadao
- The Museum of Kyoto
- Building of the former Kyoto office of the Bank of Japan (1906)
- Nakagyō-ku ward post office (1902)
- Nippon Telegraph and Telephone West Corporation (NTT) Kyoto Branch
- Building of the Shinpukan (1926)
- Sanjō shopping street (三条商店街)
- Shimadzu Corp. headquarters
- Toei Kyoto Studio Park
- Arashiyama

=== Railway Stations ===
- JR West - Yamashina
- Kyoto City Subway Tozai Line - Yamashina, Misasagi, Keage, Higashiyama, Sanjo Keihan, Uzumasa Tenjingawa
- Keihan Railway Keishin Line - Shinomiya, Keihan-yamashina, Misasagi
- Keihan Railway Keihan Main Line, Oto Line - Sanjo
- Randen Tram Line - Nishiōji-Sanjō, Yamanouchi, Randen-Tenjingawa, Kaikonoyashiro, Uzumasa-Kōryūji, Katabiranotsuji
