= Niwaka (company) =

Japanese jewellery manufacturer and seller

NIWAKA Corporation
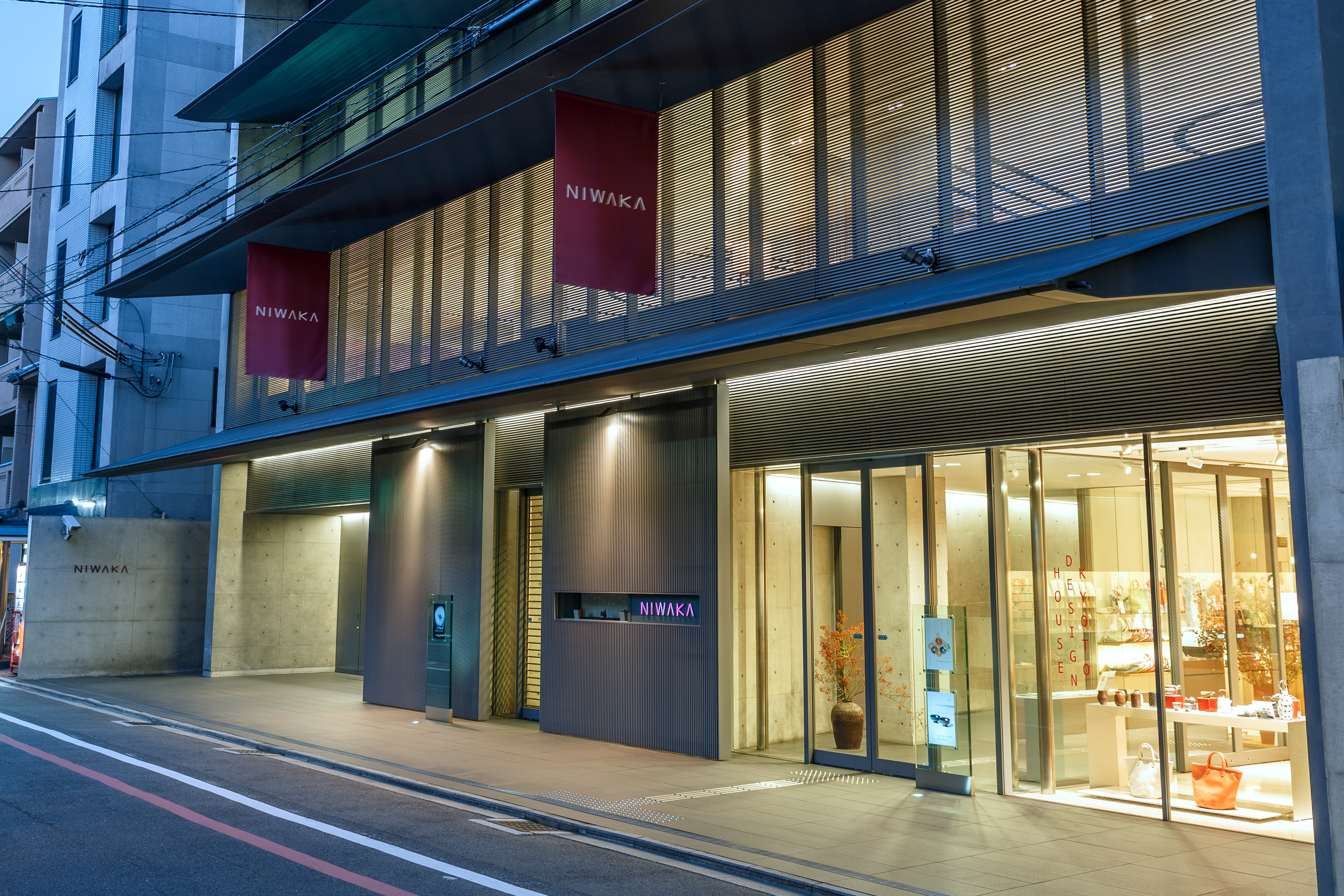
- NIWAKA building by Ando Tadao (2009).
- Native name: 株式会社 俄
- Industry: Jewelry
- Headquarters: 105 Fukunaga-cho, Nakagyo-ku, Kyoto, Japan
- Website: https://www.niwaka-en.com/

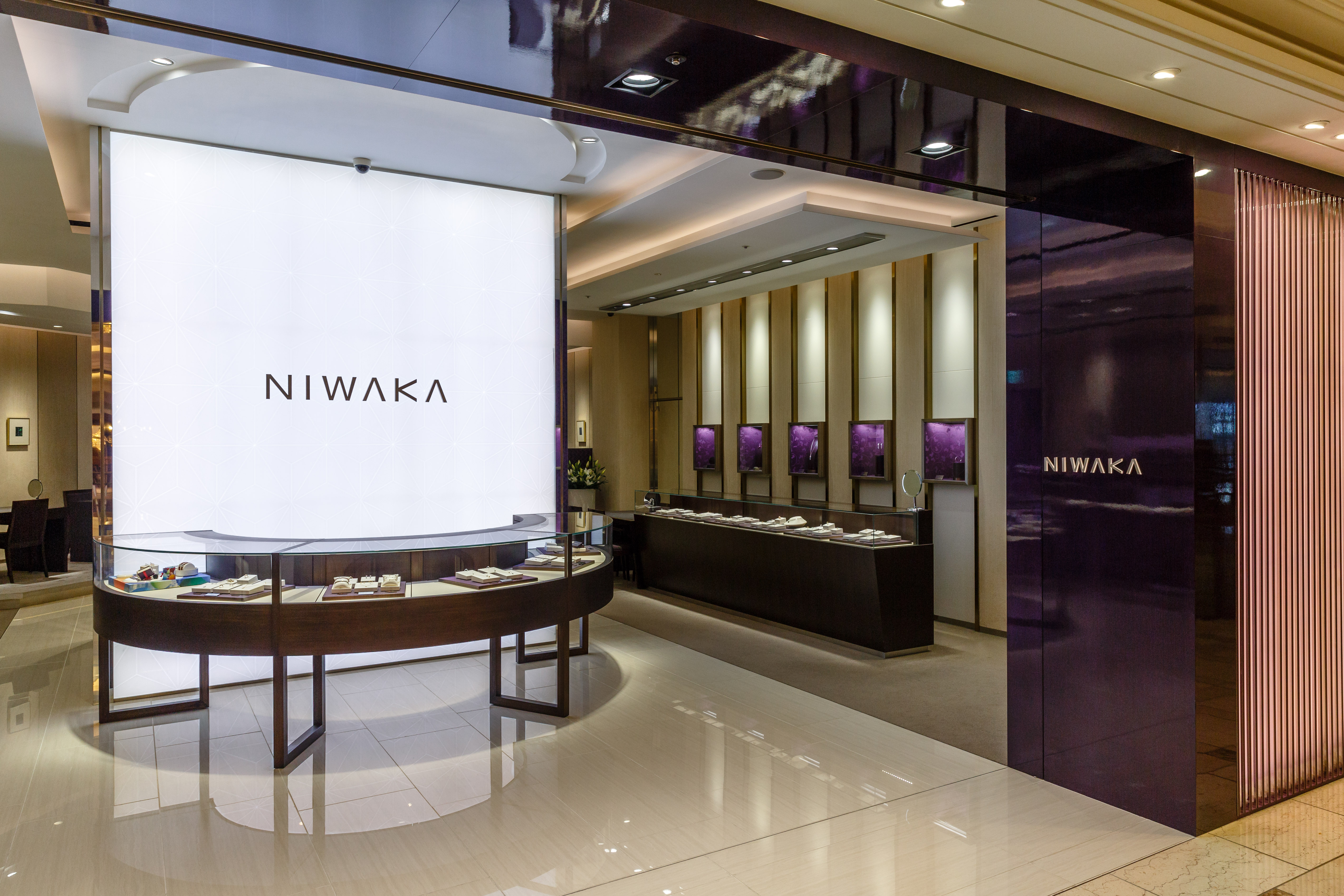
NIWAKA store.

NIWAKA Corporation (株式会社俄 かぶしきがいしゃにわか kabushiki-gaisha niwaka) is a Japanese luxury jewellery manufacturer and seller. The brand originated in Kyoto and its designs are inspired by elements of the culture and history of the city, such as the Gion Matsuri, its cityscape, the passing of the seasons and the surrounding nature. The brand is also rooted in traditional Japanese motifs that range from Japanese kanji and architecture, to patterns used in Japanese paintings.

Currently its headquarters are located in the Nakagyō-ku ward of Kyoto.

== History ==
The company was founded in 1983. In 2001 the brand opened a flagship store and studio in the northern area of the city, in a building designed by Shin Takamatsu Architect and Associates Co, Ltd. One of the most notable aspects of this building is the use of a single glass panel on the front window, which was the largest single panel in production at the time. As a result, the view from the interior resembles a mural.

In 2009 the flagship store and head office were relocated to a new building designed by Japanese architect Tadao Ando, near the intersection of Tominokoji and Sanjō streets, an area with many long-established Japanese Ryokan and famous restaurants. According to Tadao Ando, due to the many building ordinances of Kyoto City, it was a difficult task to design the roof because of the many regulations. The building is recognized for its design that blends in with the traditional cityscape of Kyoto.

=== Present day ===
The brand plays an important role on the Japanese jewelry market and in recent years it has also gained recognition overseas, being worn at major red carpet events. It also makes efforts to preserve the traditional arts and crafts of its birthplace.

On its country of origin, the company currently has 16 directly operated stores and 50 other points of sales. In February 2020 the brand opened a new special concept store in Ginza (Tokyo), a five-story building with a design reflective of the company's identity, becoming its largest retail space to date. Its design incorporates traditional Japanese motifs interpreted in a modern way, such as shoji sliding panels, wisteria trellis and the ancient pathways of Kyoto. It also makes use of traditional materials such as Nishijin-ori fabrics in its interior design.

The design of this building has received international awards for its modern interpretation of traditional Japanese motifs.
