= Shinkyōgoku Street =

Street in Kyoto city, Japan

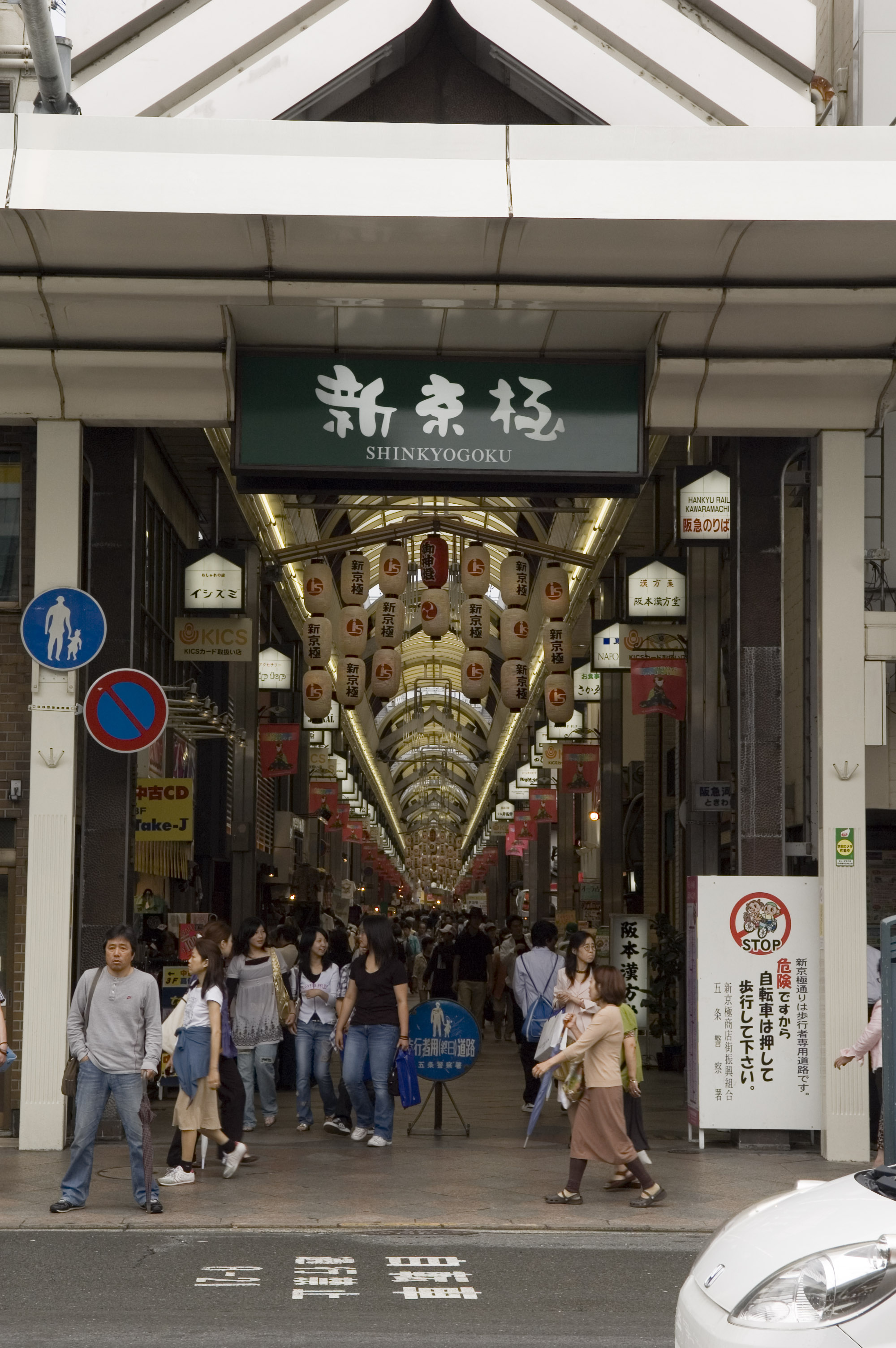
South entrance to Shinkyōgoku Street on Shijō.

Shinkyōgoku Street (新京極通 しんきょうごくどおり Shinkyōgoku Dōri) is a shopping street that runs from north to south in the center of the city of Kyoto. The street extends for approximately 500 m from Sanjō Street on its northern end to Shijō Street on its southern end and it is located between Ura Teramachi Street (East side) and Teramachi Street (west side).

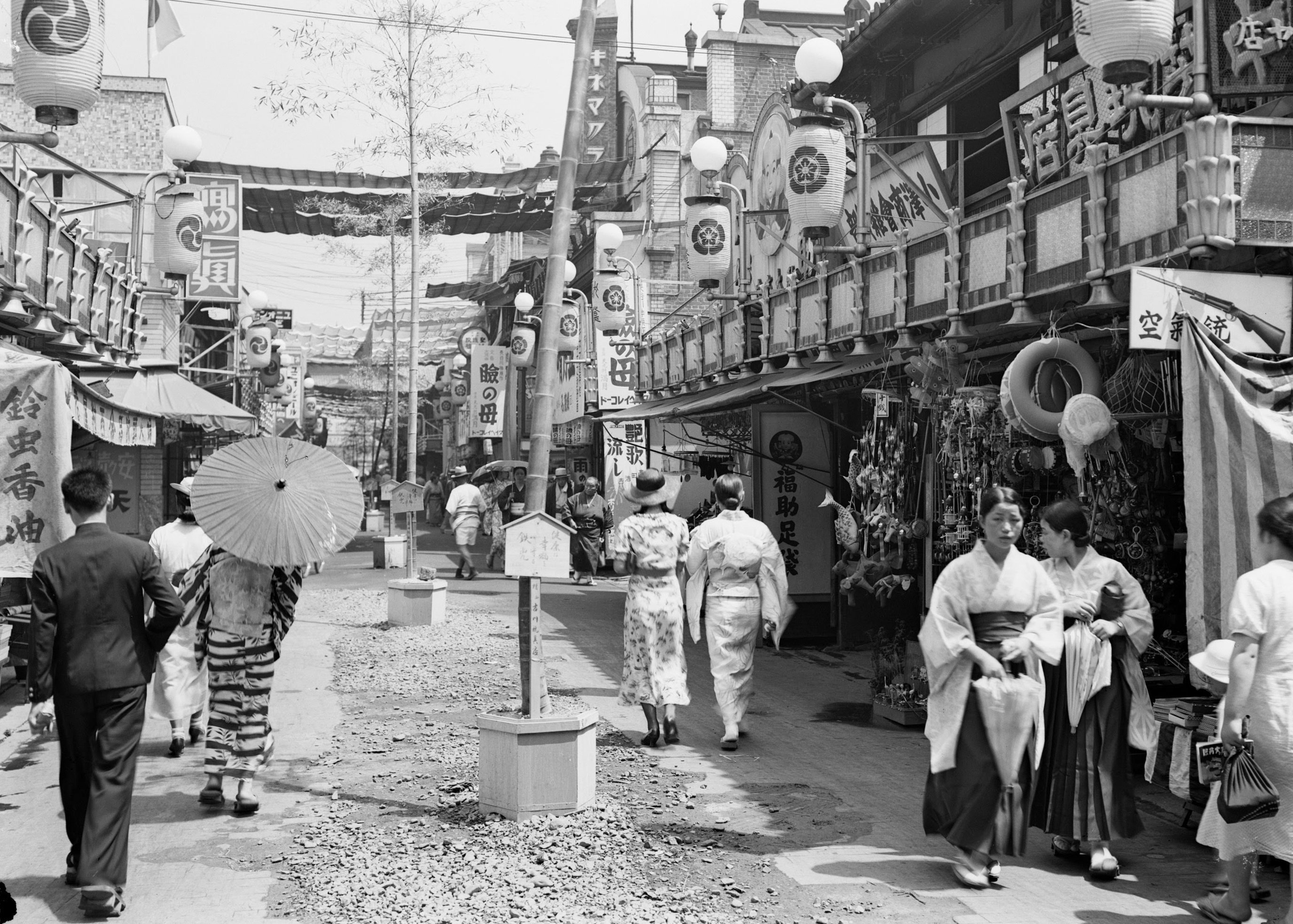
Shinkyōgoku Street, circa 1920.

== History ==
The site of modern-day Shikyōgoku Street corresponds to the Higashi Kyōgoku Ōji street of the Heian Kyō. Between 1573 and 1592 many Buddhist temples were built in the area, which also stimulated the development of entertainment businesses on the surroundings. Then, in 1872, Shinkyōgoku Street was built as part of a plan to boost the morale of the residents, which was in decline after the relocation of the capital to Tōkyō. By 1877, a great number of entertainment businesses, bars and restaurants had flourished and eventually by the end of the 19th century the place became one of the 3 major entertainment districts of Japan.

== Present Day ==
Currently the street is a covered shopping arcade, popular among school excursion students and tourists. The place is filled with souvenir shops and other establishments and along with Teramachi Street, it remains a popular shopping spot in the city.

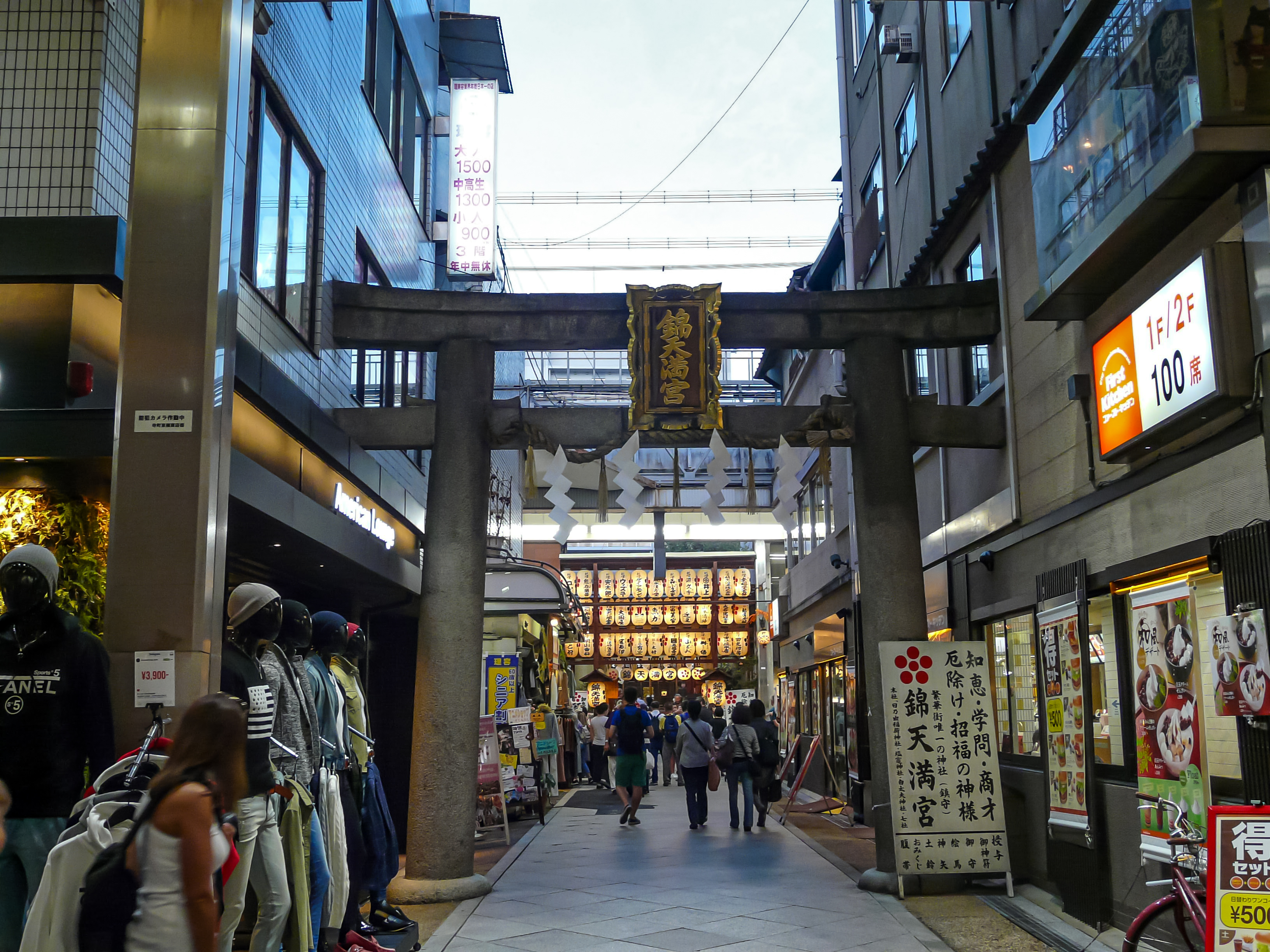
Entrance to Nishiki Tenmangū.

== Relevant landmarks along the Street ==
- Seishin-in
- Nishiki Tenmangū
- Nishiki Market
- Seigan-ji
- Anyō-ji
- Saikō-ji
