= Takase River =

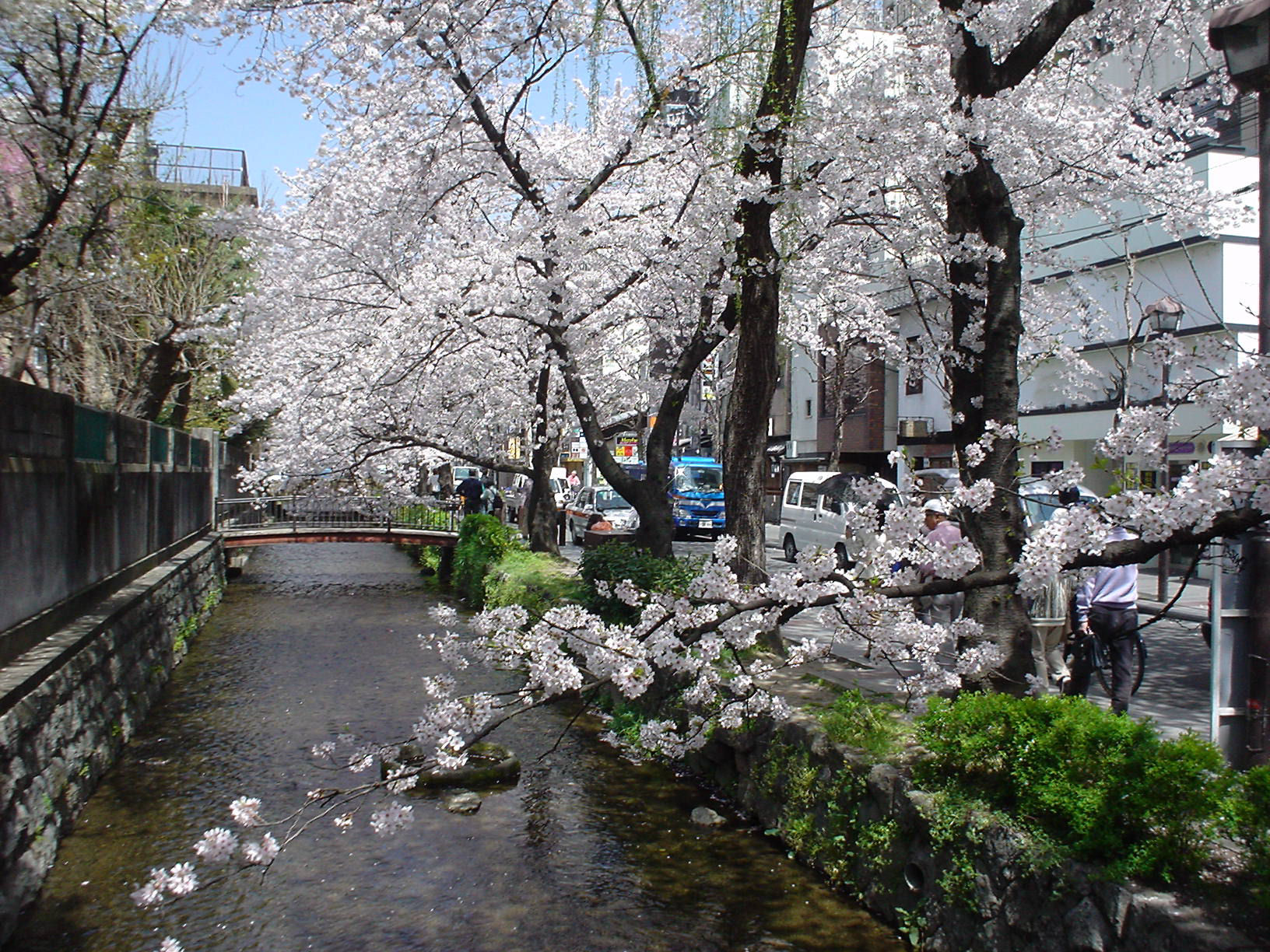
- The Takase River in central Kyoto

- Native name: 高瀬川 (Japanese)

Location
- Country: Japan

Physical characteristics
- Source
  - location: Kamo River
- Mouth
  - location: Uji River
- Length: 9.7 km (6.0 mi)

The Takase River (高瀬川, Takase-gawa) is a canal in excavated in the early Edo period in the city of Kyoto, Japan to transport various goods and resources. It made a great contribution to the development of the city and economic growth at that time. It was used for water transport between Kyoto and Fushimi for about 300 years from its excavation until 1920.

== Overview ==
The canal draws its water from the Misosogi River (a branch of the Kamo River), which runs parallel to the west bank of the Kamo River south of Nijō Ohashi Bridge. The canal begins at Nijō-Kiyamachi, going along Kiyamachi Street, and meets the Uji River at Fushimi port. The canal crosses with the Kamo River on the way, with the upstream (Kyoto) side known as the "Takasegawa", and the downstream (Fushimi) side known as the Higashi-Takasegawa or Shin-Takasegawa. The area around Takasegawa from Sanjō to Shijō in the center of Kyoto is home to the district of Pontochō, which is one of Kyoto's entertainment districts and a famous cherry blossom viewing spot. The water is shallow, only a few tens of centimeters deep, and historically plied by small boats with flat bottoms and low drafts called "Takasebune". Along the river, towpaths were built for boat pullers to manually pull these boats. The western side of the canal used to have many boat entrances and boat turning points known as "funairi" to load and unload cargo and change the direction of boats, but now all have been filled in except for "Ichi-no-funairi", which has been preserved. Today the south half is not connected with Kamo River.

== History ==
The canal was dug by Suminokura Ryōi in 1611 for the purpose of transporting materials needed in the reconstruction of the Great Buddha of Kyoto at Hōkō-ji. From 1614 it began to be used for general logistics. Throughout the Edo period, many boats traveled back and forth between Kyoto and Fushimi. In the Meiji era, when the Lake Biwa Canal was opened in 1894, the amount of goods transported decreased, although coexistence was attempted by dividing up the transport roles of goods. In June 1920, water transportation was abolished. Around this time, urban planning was considered to cover the Takase River and widen the Kiyamachi streetcar line, but due to opposition from local residents, the name was changed to Kawaramachi-dori. After the great flood of the Kamo River in 1935, the riverbed of the Kamo River was lowered by about two meters to improve flood control. As a result, the point where the Takase River flows into the Kamo River from the north was moved to near Jujo-dori, and on the other hand, it became impossible to take water from the Kamo River downstream of the Kamo River crossing (Higashi-Takase River). The Higashi-Takase River has almost no water near its starting point during normal times, and its water sources are the surrounding irrigation channels, the Lake Biwa Canal, and the Nanase River. Since 2010, Kyoto City has been implementing the "Takase River Regeneration Project" with the aim of maintaining the landscape by repairing the river basin embankments and ensuring water volume.

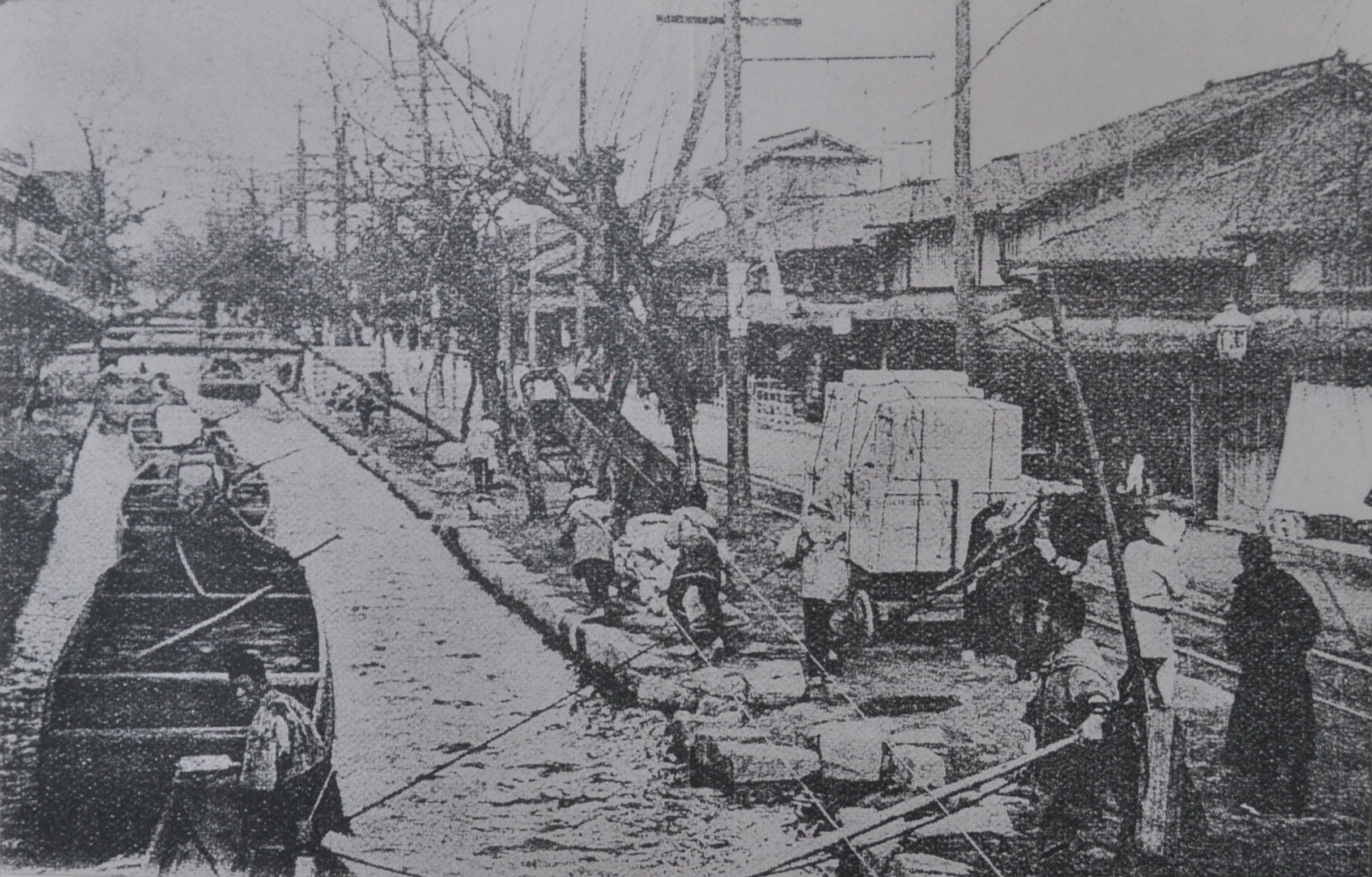
Takese River in Meiji 40

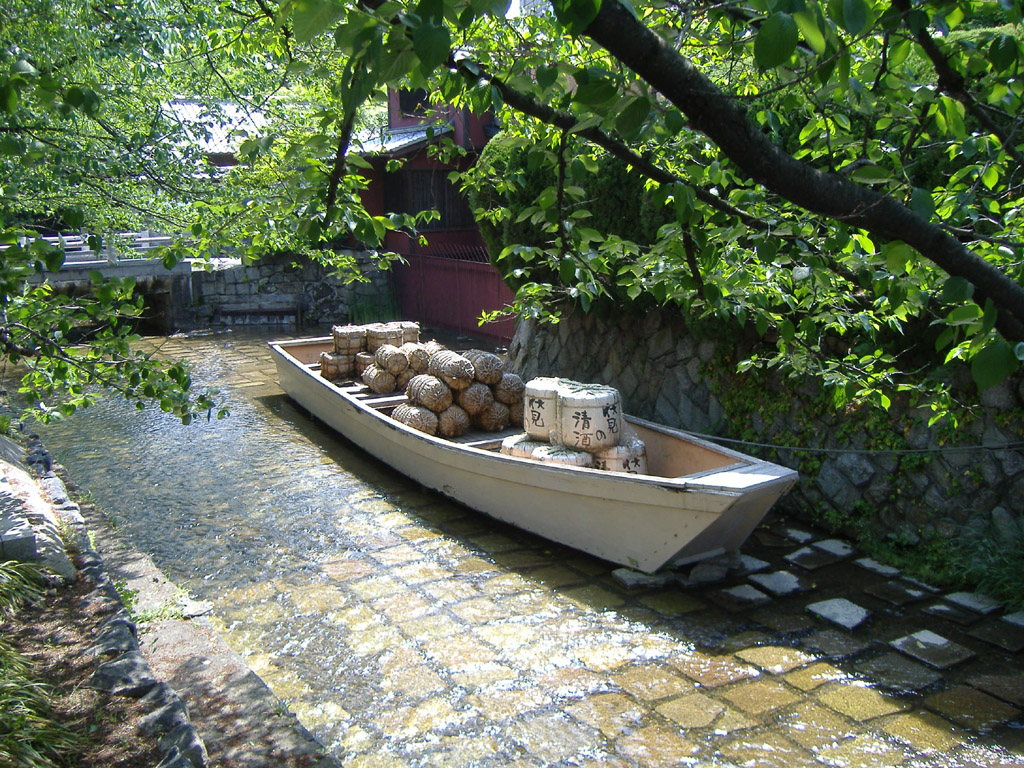
Ichinofunairi and Takasebune

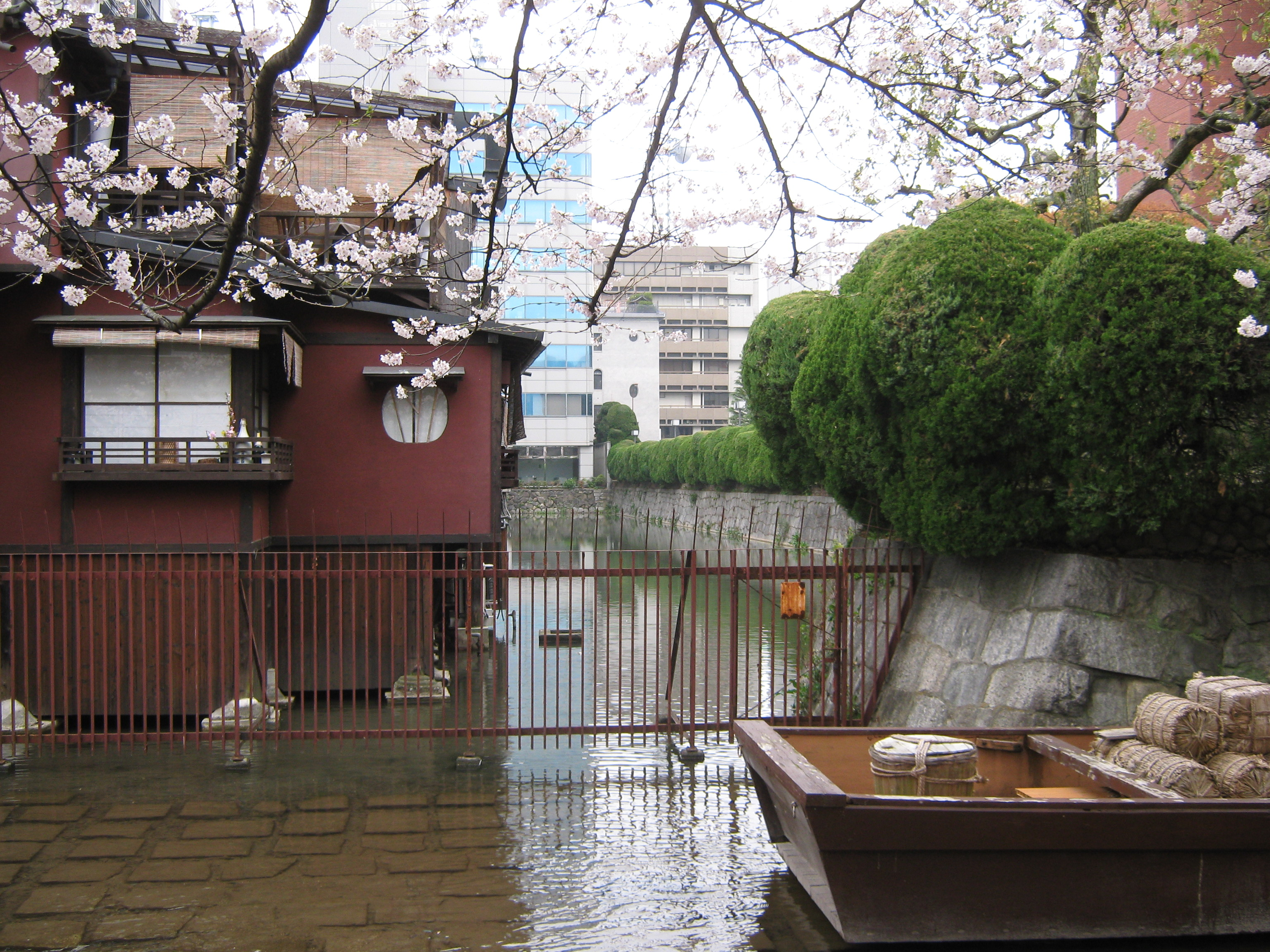
Ichinofunairi entry

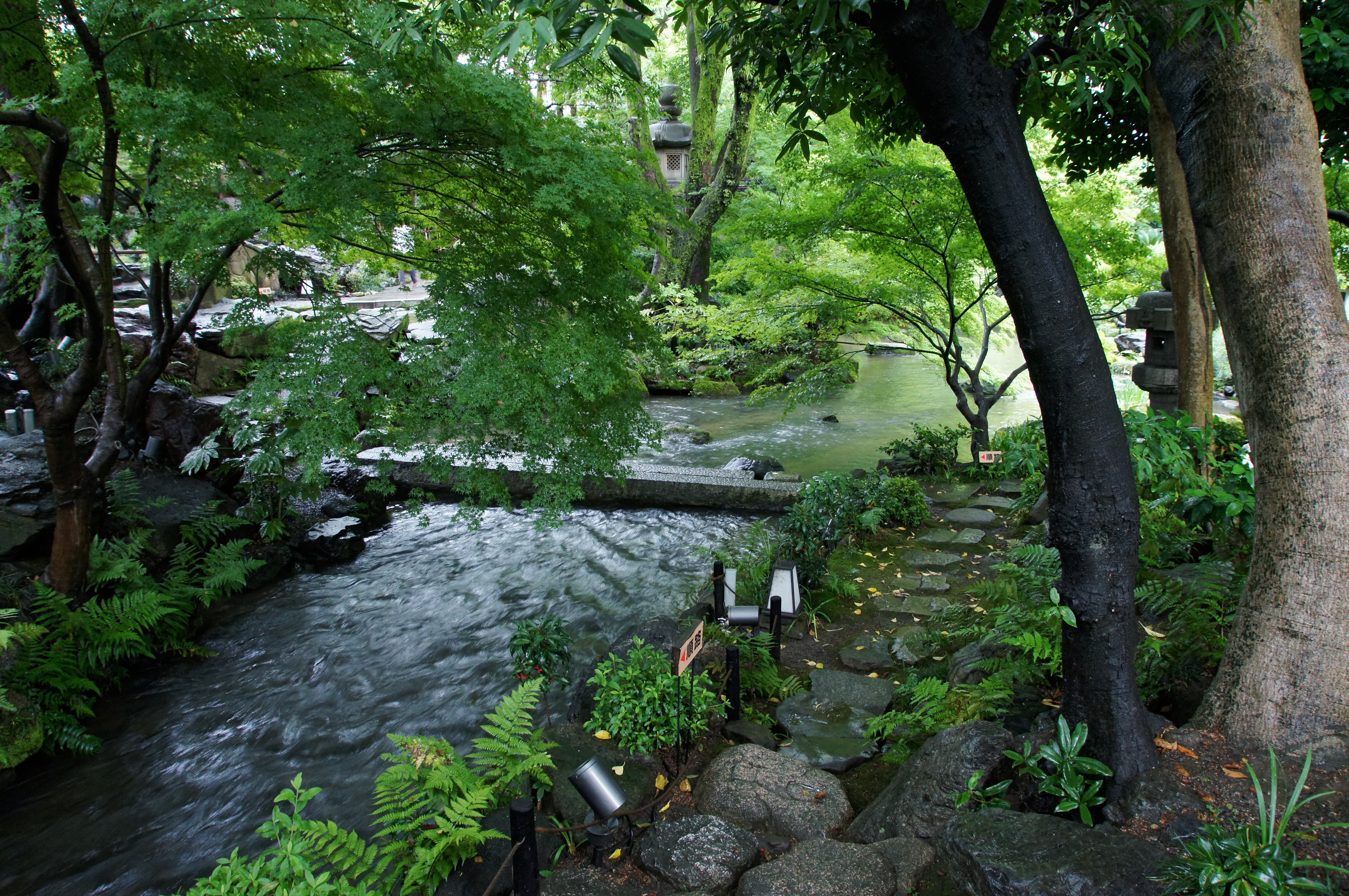
Takase River source

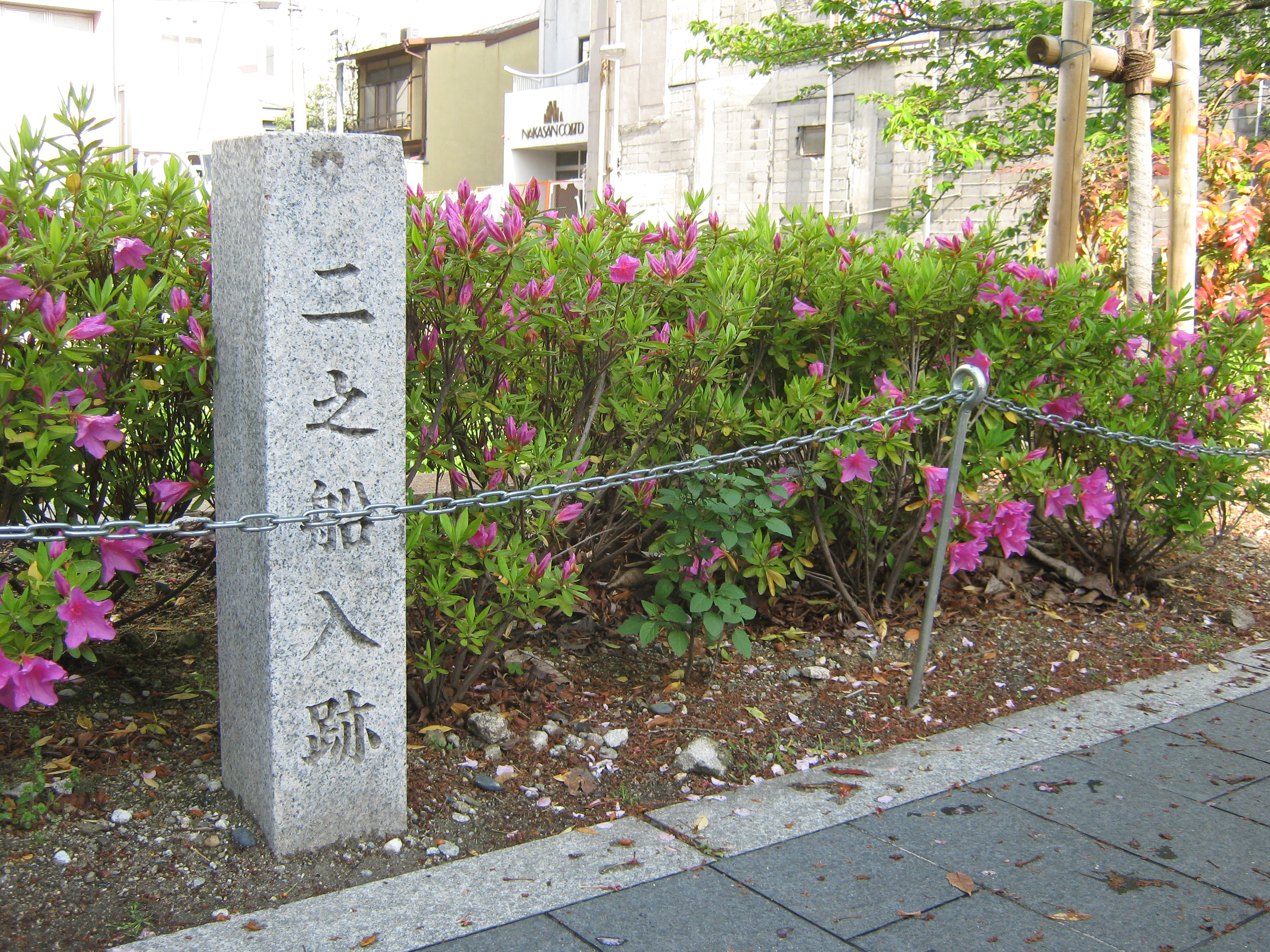
Site of the Ni-no-funairi

== Takasegawa Ichi-no-funairi ==
The Takasegawa Ichi-no-Funairi (高瀬川一之船入) is an inlet at a right angle from the Takasegawa, which allowed for boats to dock to load/offload cargo and to reverse direction. It is located in Ichino Funairi-cho, Nishigawa, Kiyamachi-dori, Nijo-sagaru, Nakagyō-ku, Kyoto. 35°00′44″N 135°46′11″E. On the canal, such boat entrances were established at roughly 100-meter intervals between Nijo and Shijo. In their heyday, there were nine boat entrances but the number increased and decreased with the rise and fall of water transportation, so there are no old maps that show all nine boat entrances. For example, the Ni-no-funairi existed for only a dozen years before 1705 and was subsequently incorporated into the adjacent Chōshū Domain residence.

The sole surviving was designated as a National Historic Site in 1934. At the time, the Ichi-no-Funairi was 134 meters east-to-west and 16 meters north-to-south, but now all that remains is a canal about 20 meters east-to-west and 6 meters north-to-south on the west side of the river. A restored Takasebune boat floats on the river. The site is about a three-minute walk from Kyoto Shiyakusho-mae Station on the Tōzai Subway Line.
