= Yamanouchi Station (Kyoto) =

Tram station in Kyoto, Japan

Yamanouchi Station: 山ノ内駅; やまのうち
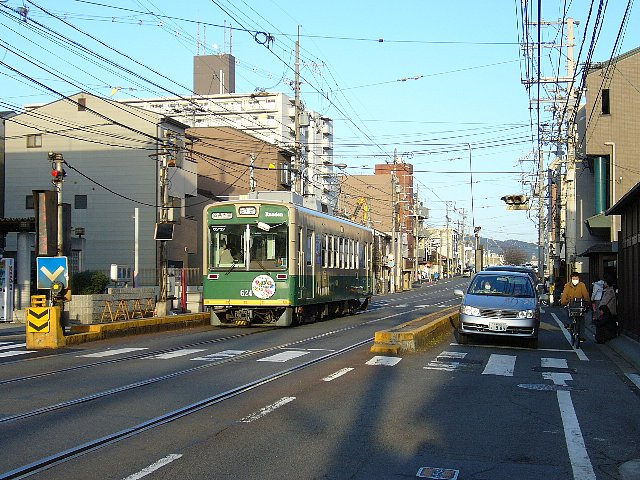
- Station platforms, 2006

General information
- Location: Ukyo-ku, Kyoto; Kyoto Prefecture; Japan
- Coordinates: 35.0083054°N 135.7231503°E
- Operator: Keifuku Electric Railroad
- Line: Randen Arashiyama Line
- Distance: 2.0km from Shijō-Ōmiya
- Platforms: 2
- Tracks: 2

Construction
- Structure type: At-grade

Other information
- Station code: A4
- Website: Official (in Japanese)

History
- Opened: March 25, 1910

Passengers
- FY2015: 0.3 million
Location

Yamanouchi Station (山ノ内駅, Yamanouchi-eki) is a tram stop in Ukyo-ku, Kyoto, Japan. The station is serviced by the Randen Arashiyama Line that begins at Shijō-Ōmiya and continues west to Arashiyama.

== Station layout ==
The station consists of two street platforms, with pedestrian crossings to the adjacent footpaths. Platform 1 services trams to Arashiyama, platform 2 for Shijō-Ōmiya.

== Adjacent stations ==
«	Service	»
Randen Arashiyama Line
Nishiōji-Sanjō (A3)	Local	Randen-Tenjingawa (A5)
