= Nijō Street =

Street in Kyoto city, Japan

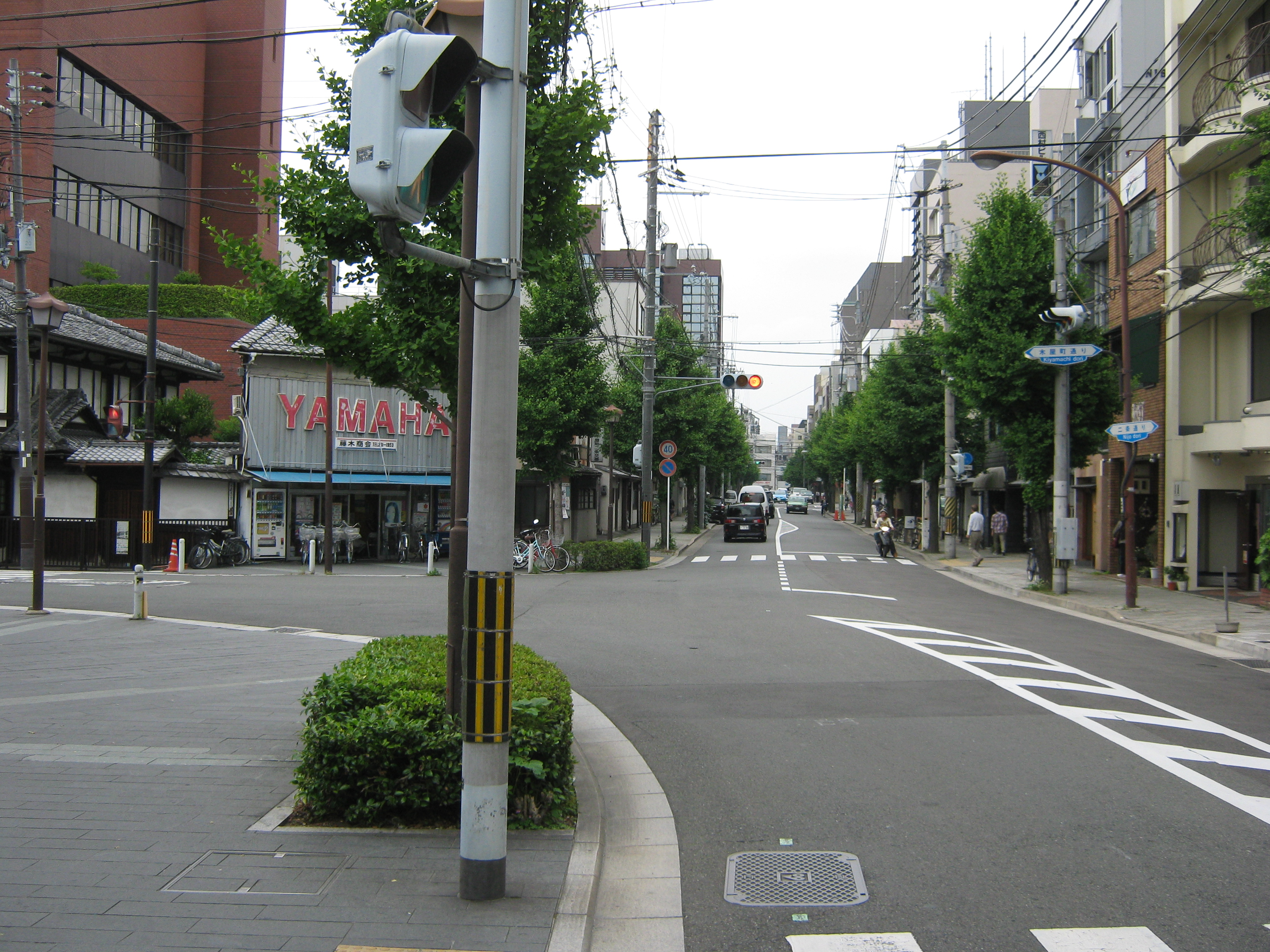
Intersection of Nijō Street and Kiyamachi Street, facing west.

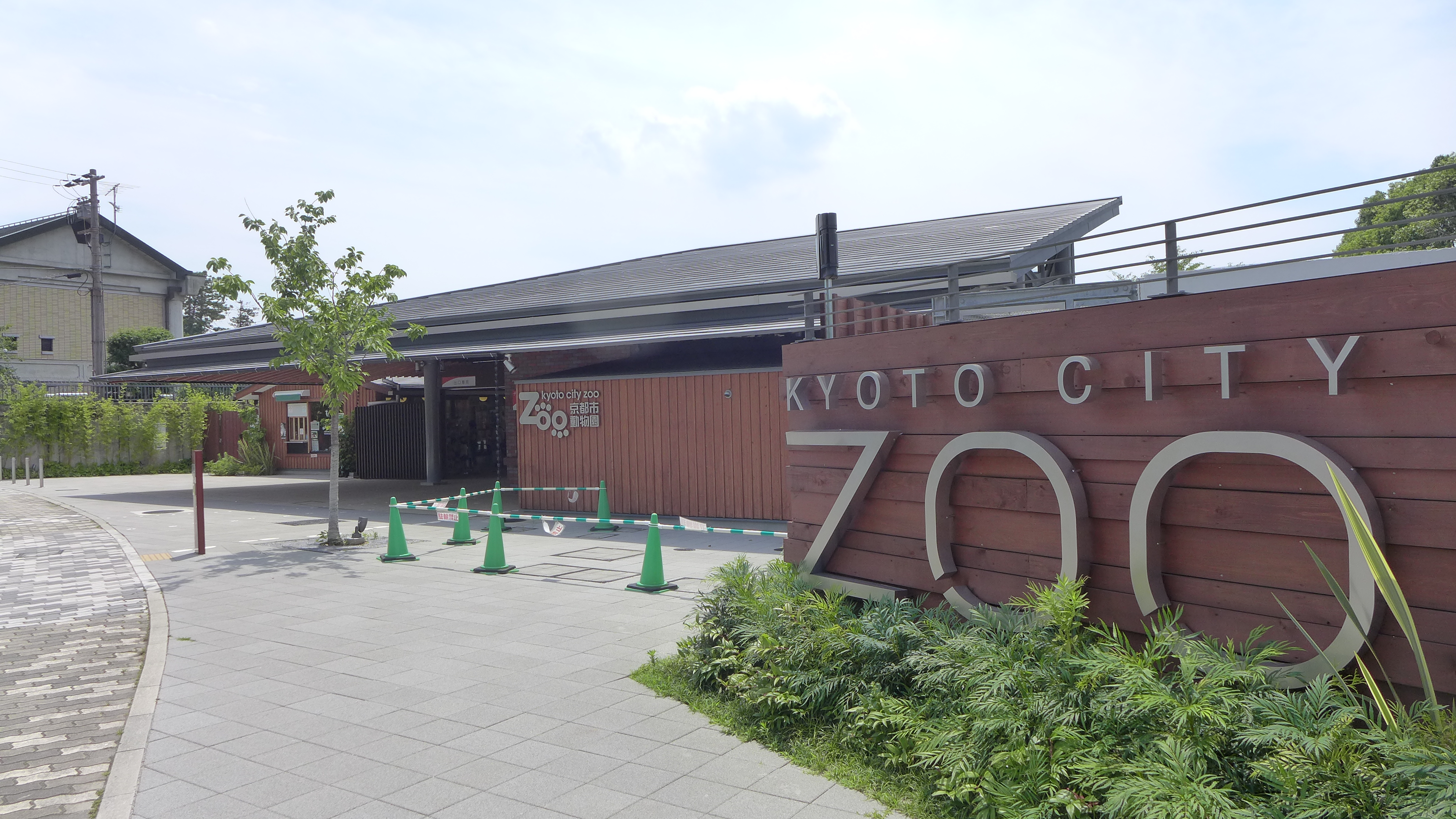
Kyoto City Zoo.

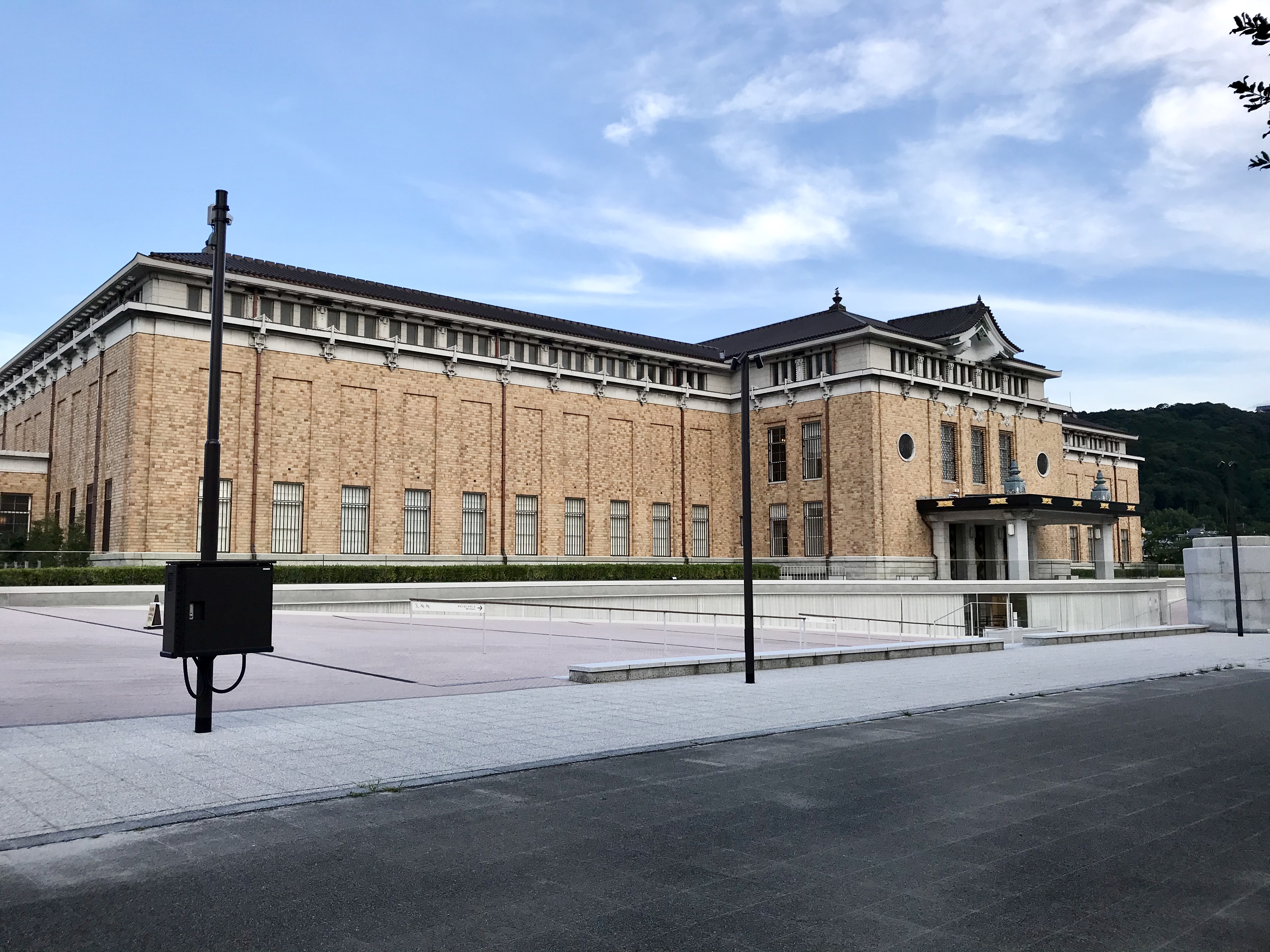
Kyoto Municipal Museum of Art.

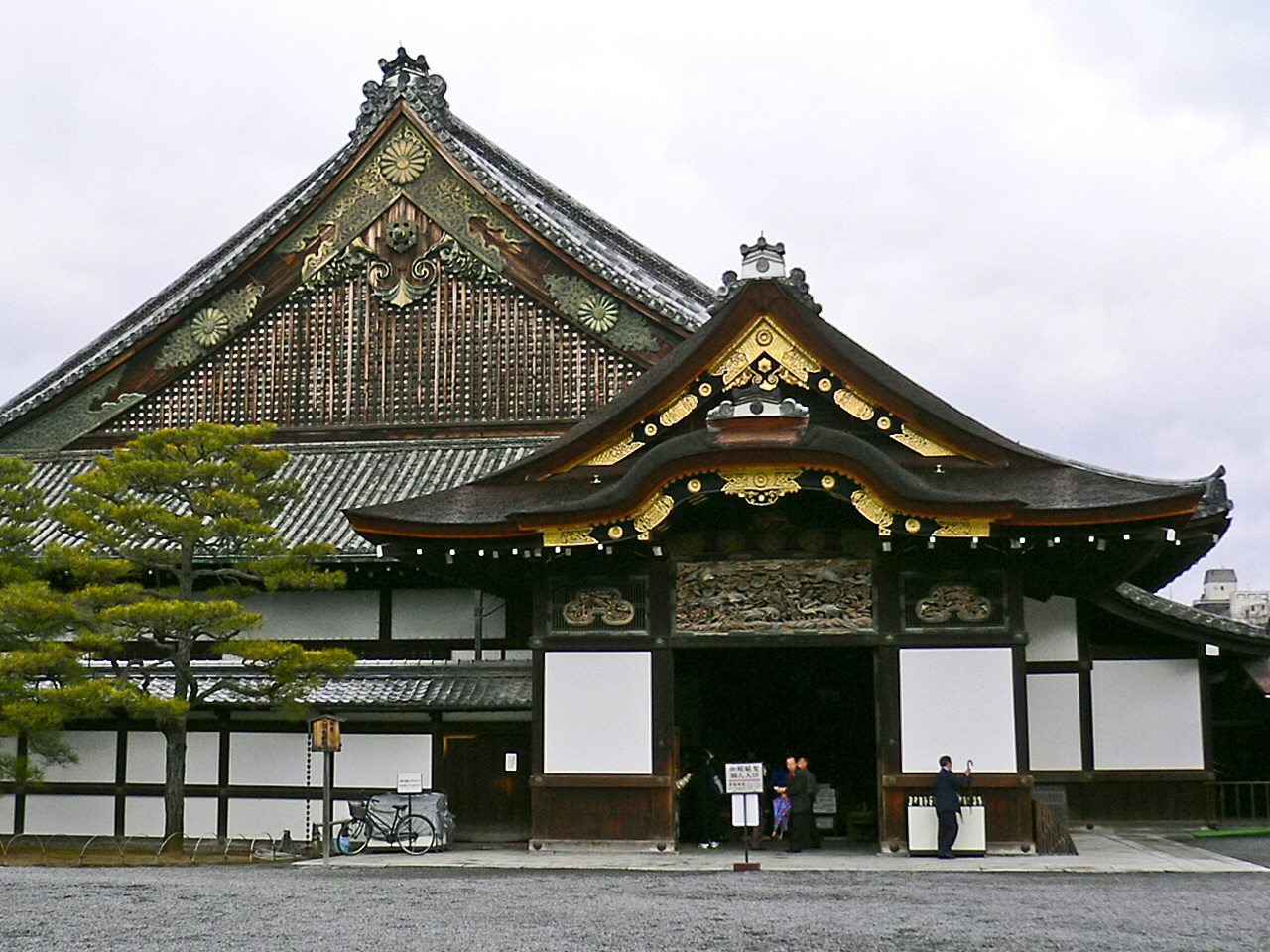
Nijō Castle.

Nijō Street (二条通 にじょうどおり Nijō dōri) is a major street that crosses the center of the city of Kyoto from east to west, running for approximately 3.5 km from Shirakawa Street (east) to the Nijō Castle (west).

== History ==
Current day Nijō Street corresponds to the Nijō Ōji of the Heian-kyō, which according to records had a total wide of 51 meters (actual road section 43.8 meters wide), being the second widest road of the time, after the Suzaku Avenue.

During the Edo period it was a drugstore district with the approval of the Tokugawa shogunate and to this day some of these businesses still remain in the area.

From 1895 to 1926, a tram operated by the former Kyoto Electric Railway ran on the street, between Teramachi Street and Jingū Michi Street.

== Present Day ==
Nowadays the section west of Teramachi Street becomes a narrow one-way road. An important number of cultural, art and education related institutions are located in the vicinity of the street as well.

== Relevant Landmarks Along the Street ==
- Kyoto City Zoo
- National Museum of Modern Art, Kyoto
- Kyoto Municipal Museum of Art
- Kyoto Prefectural Library
- ROHM Theatre Kyoto
- Miyako Messe
- The Ritz-Carlton Kyoto
- Bank of Japan Kyoto Branch
- Shimadzu Foundation Memorial Hall
- HOTEL THE MITSUI KYOTO
- Nijō Castle
