= Suminokura Ryōi =

Japanese merchant (1554–1614)

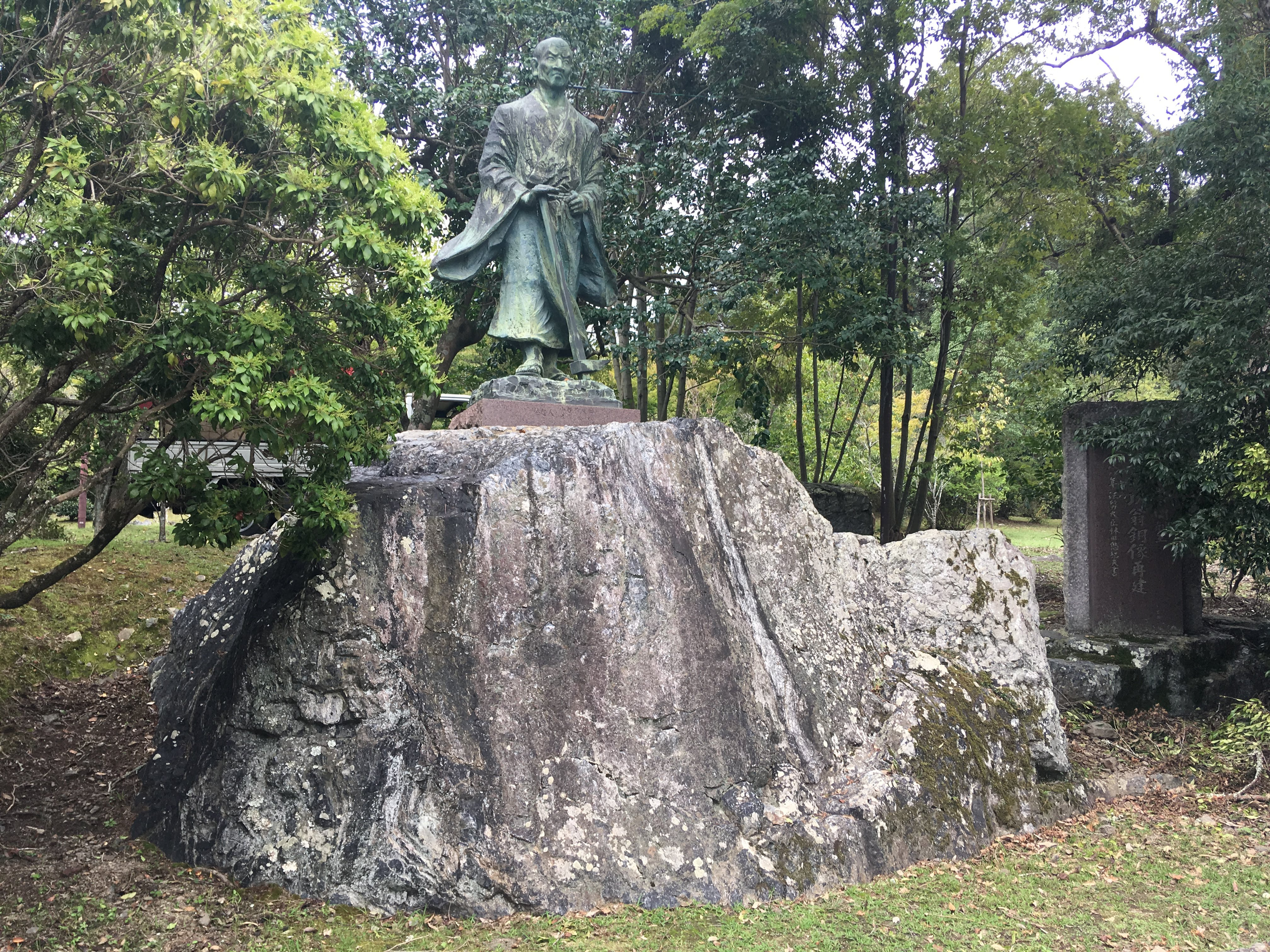
Statue of Suminokura Ryōi in Kyoto.

Suminokura Ryōi (角倉 了以, 1554 – August 17, 1614) was a merchant and shipper of Edo period Kyoto.

Along with the families of Chaya Shirōjirō and Gotō Shōzaburō, the Suminokura family, whose merchant enterprise Ryōi founded, represented one of the three chief merchant families in the city in this period.

== Life and career ==
Ryōi was born into a branch family of physicians and moneylenders. Like many commoner merchants of the period, he later came to be known by a name related to his work — Suminokura, or "corner warehouse".

Ryōi obtained a formal trade license, a shuinjō, from Toyotomi Hideyoshi, and managed overseas trading operations, importing goods from southern Vietnam. After Hideyoshi's death in 1598, Ryōi became a trusted advisor and supplier to Tokugawa Ieyasu, who became shōgun in 1603, and continued his overseas operations, with a shuinjō granted by Ieyasu.

Suminokura was conversant in Portuguese and served as an interpreter for the English pilot William Adams after Adams landed in Japan in 1600. Suminokura accompanied Adams to the Battle of Sekigahara, where Adams and his Dutch crew supported Tokugawa's army with cannon.

Between 1605 and 1611, he also played a major role in constructing canals and making the rivers of Kyoto more navigable, so as to better ship goods to, from, and within the city. These included the Tenryū, Takase, Fujigawa, and Hozu rivers; in exchange for his efforts, the Suminokura business was granted extended shipping rights within the city.

Ryōi's sons Suminokura Genshi and Soan followed in their father's footsteps, and took over the family business after his death, enjoying considerable prosperity until the imposition of maritime restrictions by the shogunate in the mid-1630s, when trade with Vietnam came to an end.
