= Picchio Wildlife Research Center =

Japanese wildlife research and conservation organization

- ピッキオ
- Formation: 1992
- Type: Wildlife conservation and ecotourism organization
- Headquarters: Karuizawa, Nagano, Japan
- Coordinates: 36.3636°N 138.5915°E
- Website: www.wildlife-picchio.com

Picchio Wildlife Research Center (Japanese: ピッキオ) is a wildlife research, conservation, and ecotourism organization based in Karuizawa, Nagano Prefecture, Japan. Established in 1992 as the Wild Bird Research Centre, it conducts nature-education programs and works on the management and conservation of Asiatic black bears in cooperation with the city of Karuizawa.

== History ==
Picchio was founded in 1992 in Karuizawa as the Wild Bird Research Centre. According to the organization, it adopted the name Picchio in 1995 and began a Japanese giant flying squirrel observation tour that year. Its black-bear management program began in 1998; the organization has undertaken work for Karuizawa since 2000.

=== Awards ===
The organization received the Grand Prize in Japan's first Eco-tourism Awards, presented by the Japan Ministry of the Environment, in 2005. In 2011, Picchio received the AEON Environmental Foundation Award for biodiversity and in 2018, received the award for Responsible Tourism.

== Activities ==
Picchio's activities combine guided nature tours with wildlife conservation. The Japan National Tourism Organization describes its Karuizawa center as providing education programs and habitat-management projects as part of efforts to protect bears in the area's hills.

Its bear-management work focuses on reducing conflict between people and Asiatic black bears. Methods described by the organization include tracking and monitoring individual bears, habitat management, measures to prevent bears from accessing human food sources, and the use of trained bear dogs to deter bears from developed areas.

Research associated with the center has included a 2021 article in the journal Ursus reporting video evidence of an apparent infanticide event involving Asiatic black bears in Nagano Prefecture.

== Activities outside of Karuizawa ==
Picchio also operates a nature-guiding business in Shiretoko Peninsula, Hokkaido. The Shiretoko Shari Tourist Association lists Picchio Shiretoko as a provider of wildlife-watching tours and describes Picchio as operating in both Shiretoko and Karuizawa. Its Shiretoko programs include guided walks and treks, wildlife night drives, and seasonal wildlife-observation tours.
