= Teramachi Street =

Street in Kyoto, Japan

Coordinates: 35°0′23″N 135°46′0.8″E

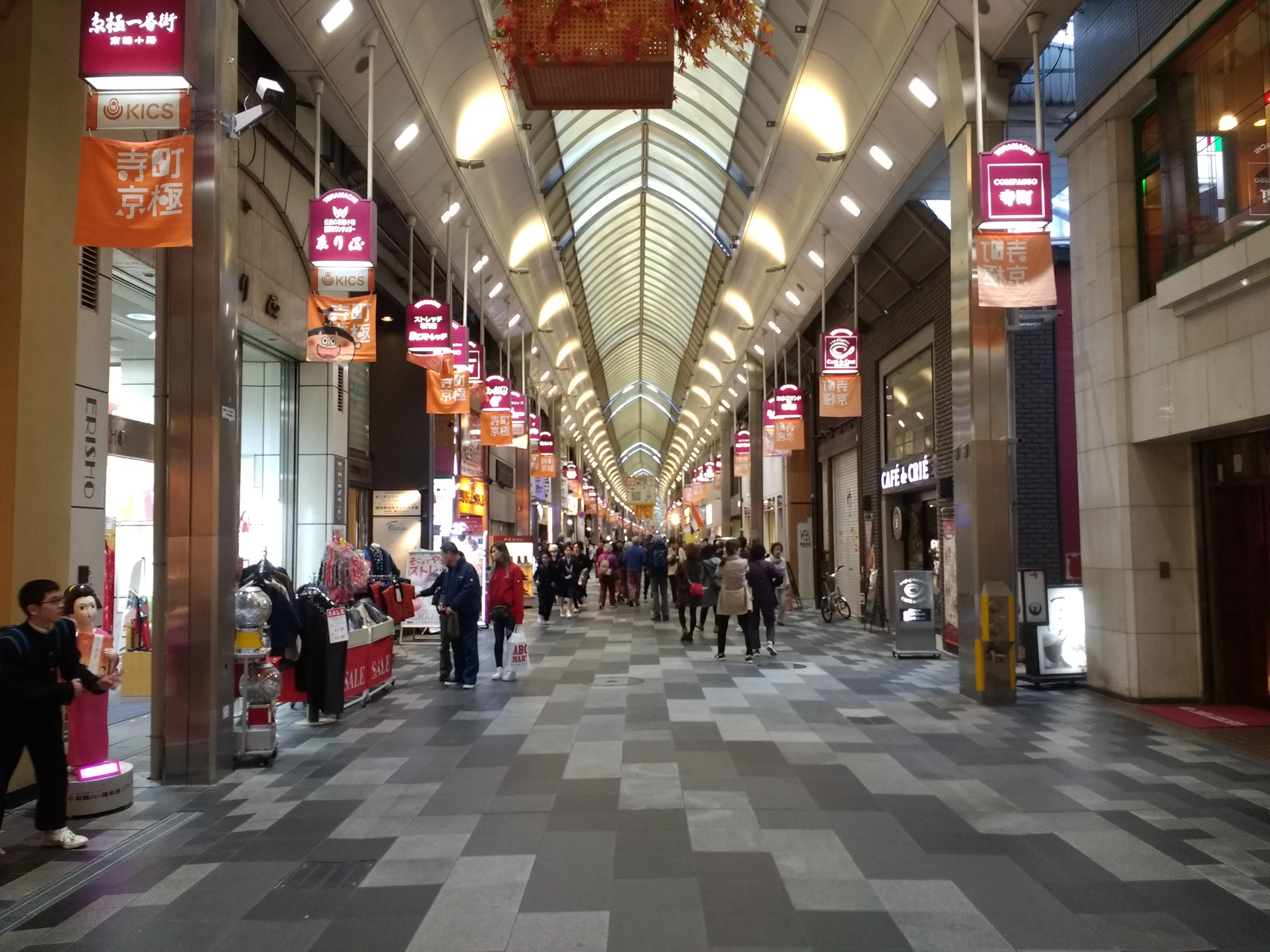
The Teramachi Street arcade

Teramachi Street (寺町通 てらまちどおり, teramachidōri) is a historical street in Kyoto, Japan, running north–south from Kuramaguchi Street to Gojō Street, for about 4.6 km.

== History ==
Present day Teramachi Street corresponds to the Higashi Kyōgoku Ōji of the Heian-kyō. At the time the Street was about 32 meters wide but later it was destroyed due to the Ōnin War.

In the year 1590 the street was reconstructed by Toyotomi Hideyoshi, who ordered a large number of Buddhist temples to be moved to the site. According to records, there were approximately 80 temples in the area, from different sects.

The street's name literally means "Temple Town", similar to English "Templeton", and reflects the large number of temples moved there during Toyotomi Hideyoshi's remodeling of Kyoto in the 16th century.

It is said that by lining up the temples, Toyotomi Hideyoshi actually wanted to protect the city from attacks coming from the east, as invaders would run into the sacred buildings first, making it hard for them to proceed with their plans and destroy the city.

During the Edo period, stores selling books, Buddhist rosaries, writing brushes and medicines began to flourish in the area; as well as the shops of paper and shamisen craftsmen, which eventually gave shape to the street of today.

From 1895 to 1926, there was a tram running between Marutamachi Street and Nijō Street.

== Present Day ==
Nowadays the street runs on the east side of the Kyoto Imperial Palace, between Kawaramachi Street (east side) and Gokomachi Street (west side).

The section extending from Marutamachi Street to Nijō Street is known as Teramachikai and is lined with antique stores and galleries. The section from Oike Street to Sanjō Street is a shopping arcade called Teramachi Shōtengai.

The area extending from Sanjō Street to Shijō Street is also an arcade containing an assortment of shops and services, both traditional and modern, which receives the name of Teramachi Kyōgoku Shōtengai (Compasso Teramachi).

The section between Oike Street and Shijō Street is closed to vehicular traffic during the day and along with the shopping streets Kawaramachi and Shinkyōgoku forms a pedestrian passage, which is currently a popular shopping spot in the city among young people and tourists as well.

The section between Shijō Street and Takatsuji Street has many electronic shops, receiving the name of "Teramachi Denkigai".

== Relevant Landmarks Along the Street ==
- Yatadera
- Rozan-ji
- Honnō-ji
- Kyoto Imperial Palace
- Kyoto City Library of Historical Documents
- Kyoto City Hall
