= Keishun-in =

Buddhist temple in Kyoto, Japan

Keishun-in 桂春院
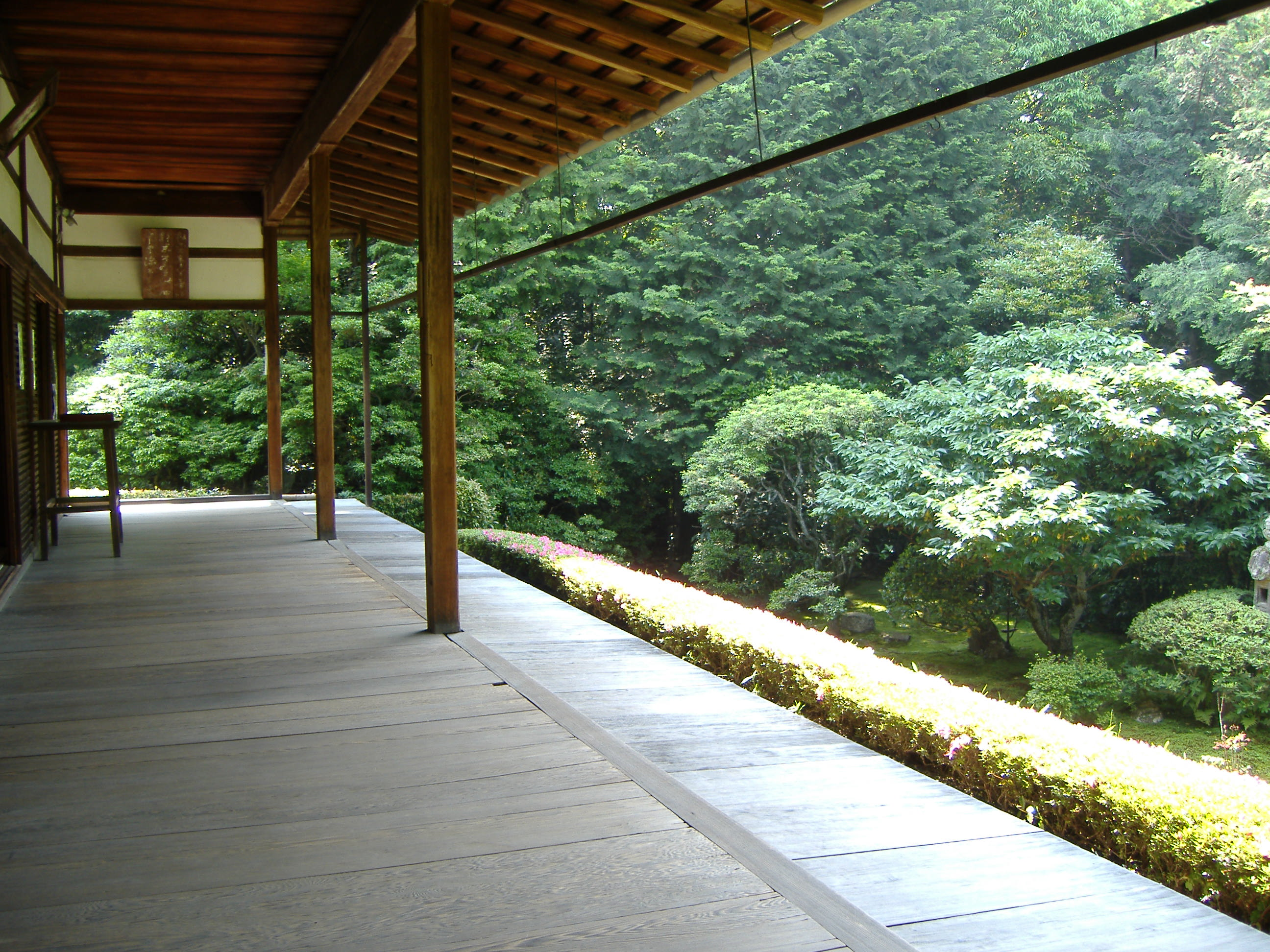
- Keshun-in

- Keishun-in Keishun-in (Japan)

Religion
- Affiliation: Buddhist
- Deity: Yakushi Nyorai
- Rite: Rinzai school Myōshin-ji branch

Location
- Location: 11 Hanazono-Jinomakacho, Ukyō-ku, Kyoto-shi, Kyoto-fu
- Country: Japan
- Interactive map of Keishun-in 桂春院
- Coordinates: 35°1′29.47″N 135°43′20.76″E

Architecture
- Founder: Oda Hidenori
- Completed: 1598
- National Place of Scenic Beauty National Historic Site of Japan

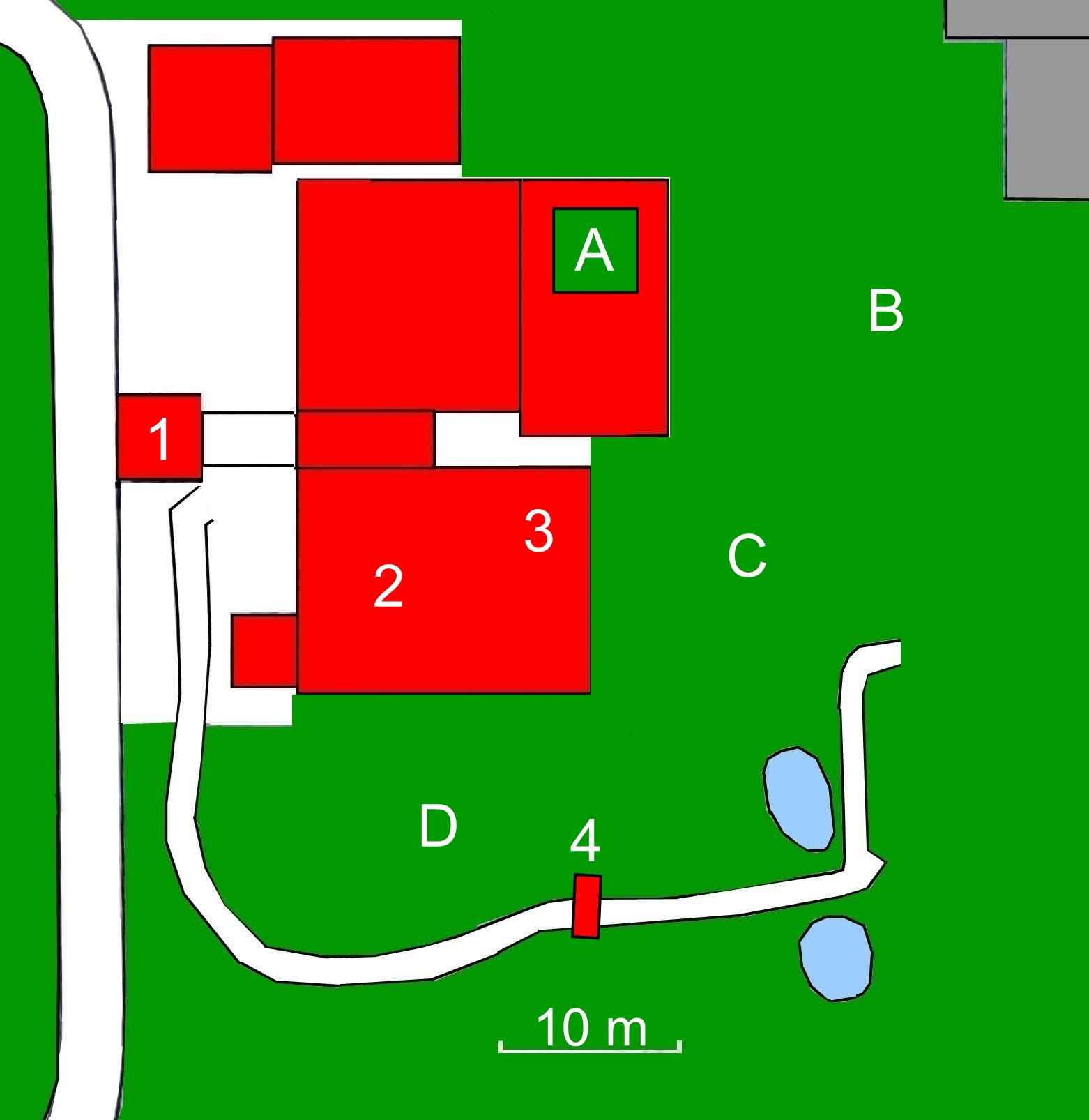
Temple Layout

Keishun-in (桂春院) is one of the 48 tatchu sub-temples Myōshin-ji, a Rinzai school Zen Buddhist temple in the Hanazono neighborhood of Ukyō-ku in the city of Kyoto Japan. It is one of the Myōshin-ji's sub-temples which are normally open to the public.

== Overview ==
The temple was founded in 1598 by Oda Hidenori (津田 秀則; d.1625). He was the second son of Oda Nobutada and thus the grandson of Oda Nobunaga. Originally called Kenshō-in (見性院), the temple was renamed Keishun-in in 1632 by its patron, Ishikawa Sadamasa (石河 貞政; 1575–1657), a 5000 koku hatamoto from Mino Province, on the occasion of the 50th anniversary of the death of his father, Ishikawa Mitsumasa (石河 光政).

The temple is entered from the west through a small gate (Omote-mon, 1 on the plan). The abbot's residence (方丈 Hōjō; 2 on the plan) was built in 1631. This building has a irimoya-style hipped roof. The central interior contains the prayer room with the honzon main image, a Yakushi Nyorai, and another room. All of the fusuma sliding doors are painted with landscapes by Kanō Sansetsu, Kanō Sanraku's master student. In the center, the sliding doors depict a landscape with leafless trees and ravens, a boat dock, and monks. The eastern room depicts a landscape with wild geese landing, while the western room features old pine trees and a waterfall surrounded by vines. The composition on the sliding doors, "Three-Day Moon and Pines on a Gold Background" (金碧松三日月 Kinpekimatsu mikazuki), was originally a mural behind the altar. The building is a Tangible Cultural Property of Kyoto Prefecture.

The tea room, Kihaku-an (既白庵茶室, Kihakuan chashitsu), "Almost White Hermitage," is hidden behind the northeast corner of the shoin, the abbot's private quarters. The tea room was here from Nagahama Castle along with the shoin in 1631. It is not open to the public.

== Keishun-in Gardens ==
The small Shōjō Garden (清浄の庭, "Garden of Purity") – is designed as Kare-san-sui Japanese dry garden and is located in the courtyard north of the abbot's residence, in the area between the shoin. There is a spring there and, in the northwest corner, a dry waterfall, designed with large and unusual stones from Wakayama Prefecture.

The Shii Garden (思惟の庭, "Garden of Thoughts"; C on the plan) is located east of the abbot's residence. There, 16 Arhat stones stand on two artificial elevations. The central stone is intended as a Zen meditation stone.

The Shinnyo Garden (真如の庭, "Garden of Absolute Truth"; D on the plan) is located south of the abbot's residence is evenly covered with clipped azalea bushes on the embankment and planted with maple trees on the lower level. The ground is covered with dense moss. There, 15 stones lie in a 7-5-3 arrangement. They indicate the full moon, which, according to the old lunar calendar, is visible on the 15th day of the month. A hedge separates the garden to the south from the wabi garden there.

The Wabi Garden (侘の庭, "Garden of Simplicity as Beauty and Imperfection"; B on the plan) is a tea garden, located in the area east of the shoin. A path made of stone slabs leads down through the garden. The Baiken Gate (梅軒門) and a garden gate (猿戸 Saru-do) separate the outer and inner areas. The garden then slopes further down and finally merges into the area south of the Shinnyo Garden. In the southeastern area, seven stones "sit" like Buddhas, there is a water spring, and the Green Dragon Pond (緑龍池).

The creator and date of the gardens are unclear, but Gyokuenbo, a disciple of Kobori Enshū, designed the gardens of other sub-temples of Myoshin-ji in the early Edo period, and the 7-5-3 style stonework of Shinnyo Garden is based on the Kobori Enshū method. The garden was praised in a 1799 description of Kyoto; and the four gardens as a whole were designated a National Historic Site and National Place of Scenic Beauty in 1931.

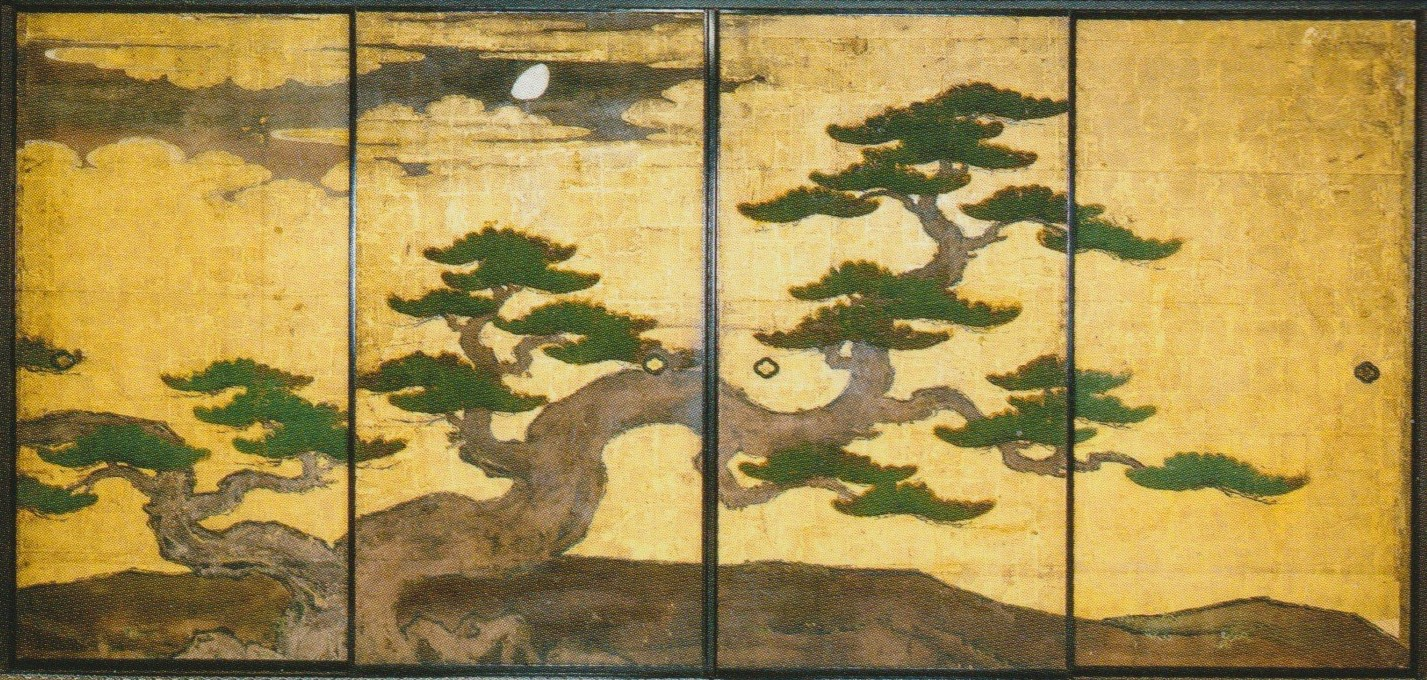
Fusuma

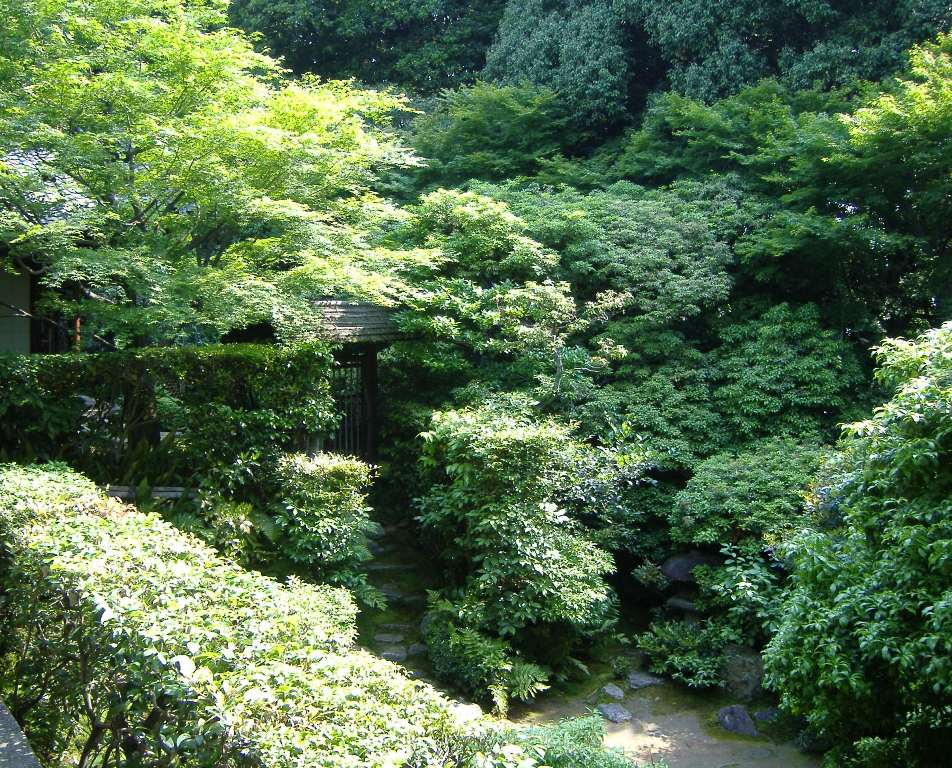
Shii Garden

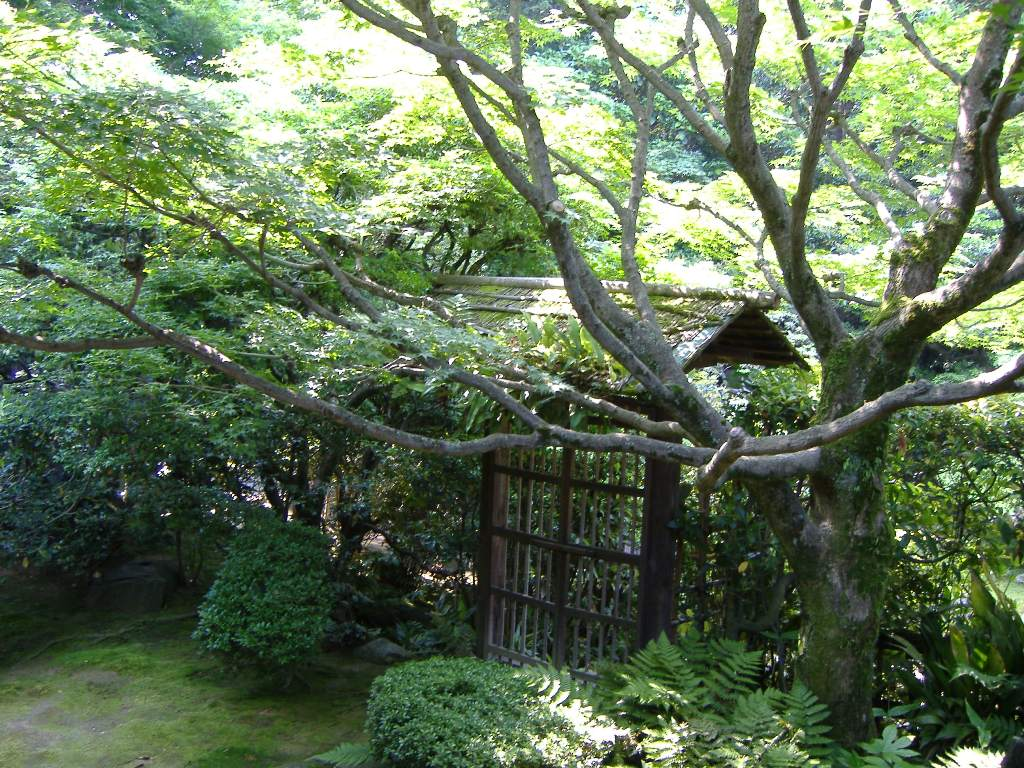
Wabi Garden

Keishun-in is located a 15-minute walk from Hanazono Station on the JR West Sagano Line.

== See also ==
- List of Historic Sites of Japan (Kyoto)
- List of Places of Scenic Beauty of Japan (Kyoto)
