= Myōshin-ji =

Buddhist temple in Kyoto, Japan

Coordinates: 35°01′23″N 135°43′13″E

Myōshin-ji 妙心寺
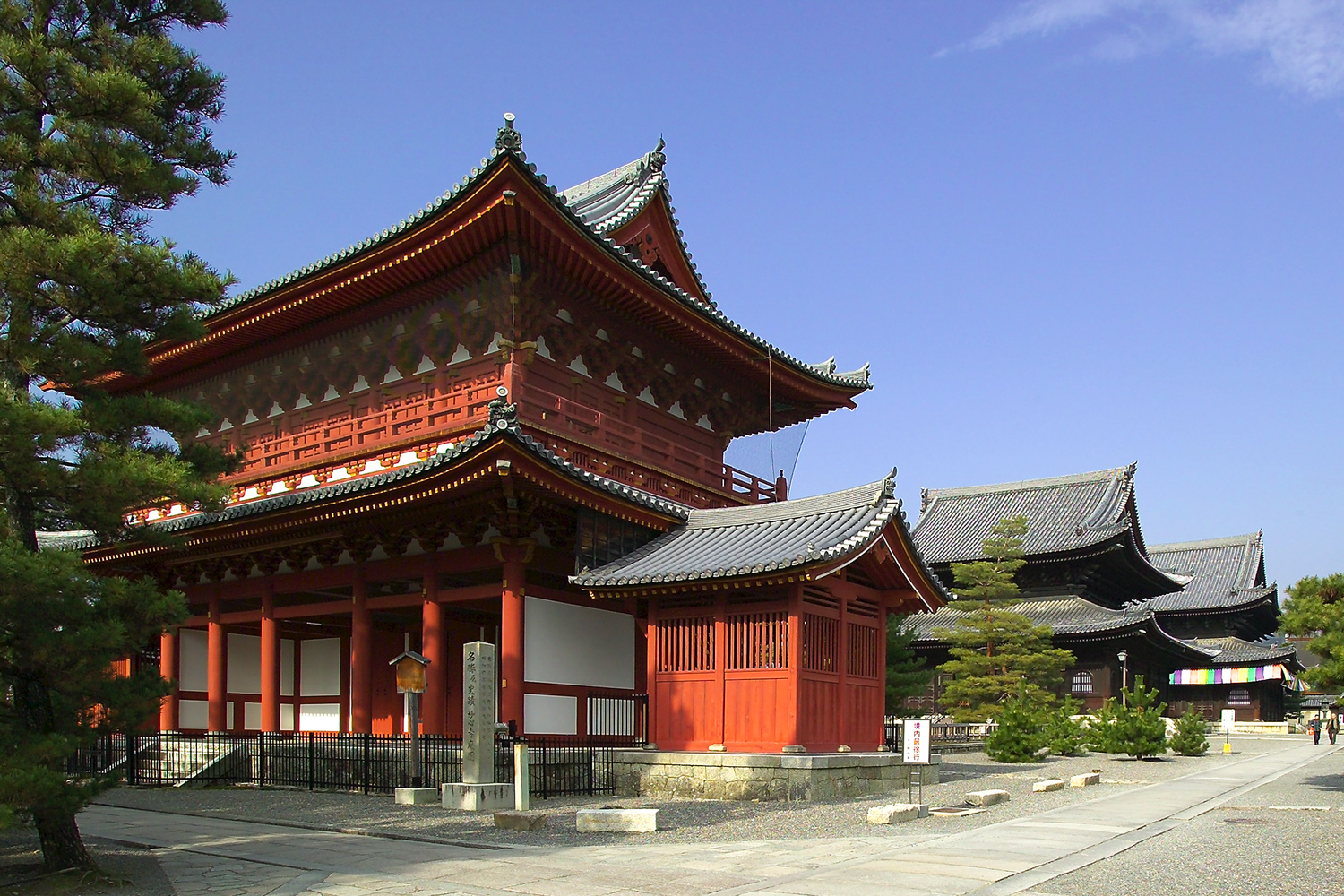
- Main buildings. Left to right: Sanmon, Butsuden, Hattō

Religion
- Affiliation: Buddhism

Location
- Interactive map of Myōshin-ji 妙心寺

Website
- https://www.myoshinji.or.jp/

Myōshin-ji (妙心寺, Myōshin-ji) is a temple complex in Kyoto, Japan, which serves as the head temple of the associated branch of Rinzai Zen Buddhism. The Myōshin-ji School is by far the largest school in Rinzai Zen, approximately as big as the other thirteen branches combined: it contains within it about 3,400 temples throughout Japan, together with a handful overseas, of the approximately six thousand total Rinzai temples, and also has nineteen associated monasteries, of the total of forty Rinzai monasteries and one nunnery.

== History ==
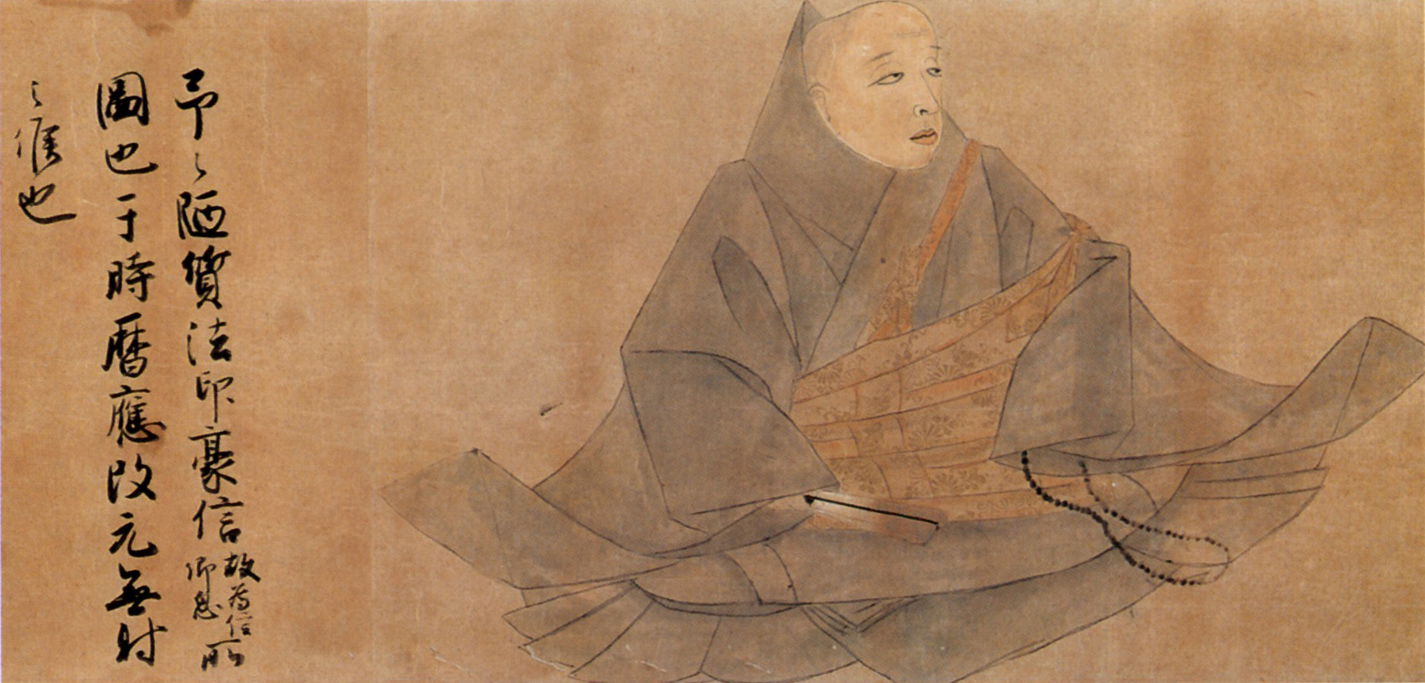
Emperor Hanazono, who sponsored the foundation of Myōshin-ji, after taking the tonsure

The grounds of the temple were formerly a palace for the Emperor Hanazono. Hanazono abdicated in 1318 and took the tonsure (became a monk) in 1335, and in 1342 donated the palace to found the temple. The district and many places in the area are named "Hanazono" in his honor. The head temple was founded in 1342 by the Zen master Kanzan Egen (関山慧玄, 1277–1360), third patriarch in the influential Ōtōkan lineage.

As with most Zen temples in Japan, in addition to the name Myōshin-ji, the temple complex also has a "mountain name," harkening back to the period in China when most Chinese Zen temples were located in the mountains. Myōshin-ji's mountain name is Shōbōzan (正法山), or "Mountain of the True Dharma."

Nearly all of the buildings were destroyed in the Ōnin War in 1467. However, many of them have been rebuilt, initially under the leadership of Sekko-Soshin Zenji (1408–1486), the sixth patriarch. The present buildings were primarily built during the following 150 years (late 15th through early 17th century), and today the gardens of Myōshin-ji are a nationally designated Place of Scenic Beauty and Historic Site.

The temple's bell, known as Okikicho, is the oldest-known example of a Buddhist bonshō ("temple bell") in Japan, as well as being the oldest bell in the world still in use. It was cast in 698.

== School ==
A difference between this and other schools of Rinzai Zen is that the Myōshin-ji school does not necessarily follow the set of established kōan for the sake of testing one's stage of enlightenment. Rather, the Myōshin-ji school allows the master to specifically tailor kōan to a student's needs and background. This method diverges from the traditionally accepted canon of kōan.

== Layout ==
External image
- 妙心寺山内図 "Myōshin-ji temple map" (in Japanese)

The complex is quite sprawling, and features a number of winding paths flanked by high walls, so it is easy to become disoriented when walking the grounds. As is usual in Japanese temple construction, the main buildings are located on the axis that extends north from the south gate in the southwest quadrant of the complex.

There is a main north–south path connecting the north gate and the south gate, which starts parallel to the main buildings, and then continues north, through a slight curve, and ends at the north gate. There is also an east–west path leading east from the main buildings (starting in the west at the sub-temple Tenju-in, passing between the hattō and butsuden, then ending in the east, after a curve, at the sub-temple Tōrin-in). In addition to the direct north–south path, there is a longer path that proceeds east from the north gate, winds past Keishun-in, and then terminates just south of Daishin-in. In addition to these main routes, there are a number of side paths which are all lined with sub-temples, generally each with a single entrance.

== Buildings ==
- Important Cultural Property of Japan
  - Chokushimon - Built in 1610.
  - Sanmon - Built in 1599.
  - Butsuden - Built in 1827.
  - Hattō - Built in 1656.
  - Dai-hōjō - Built in 1654.
  - Kuri - Built in 1653.
  - Sho-hōjō - Built in 1603.
  - Yokushitsu - Built in 1656.
  - Kyōzō - Built in 1673.
  - Minamimon - Built in 1610.
  - Kitamon - Built in 1610.
  - Genkan - Built in 1654.
  - Shindō - Built in 1656.
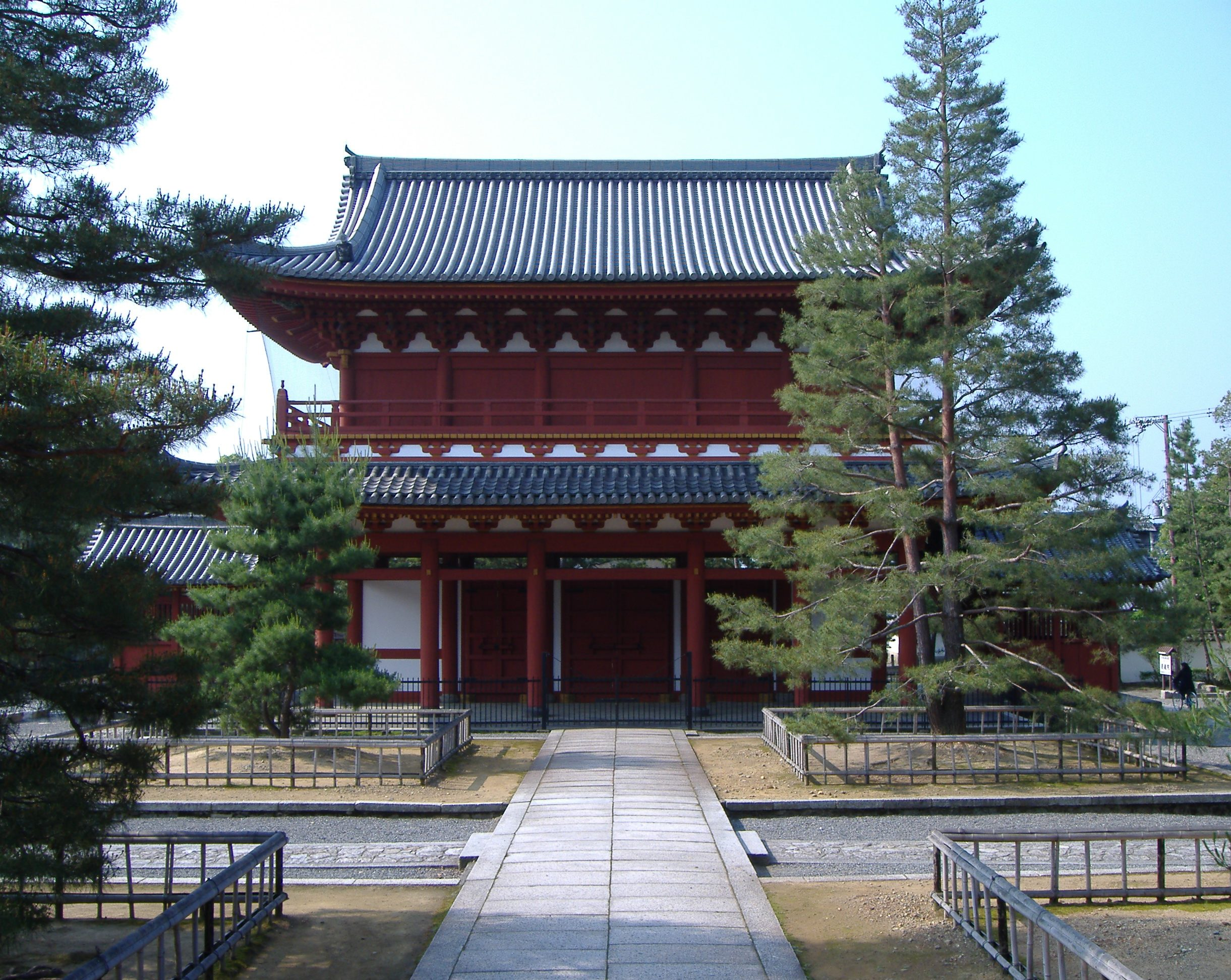
Sanmon

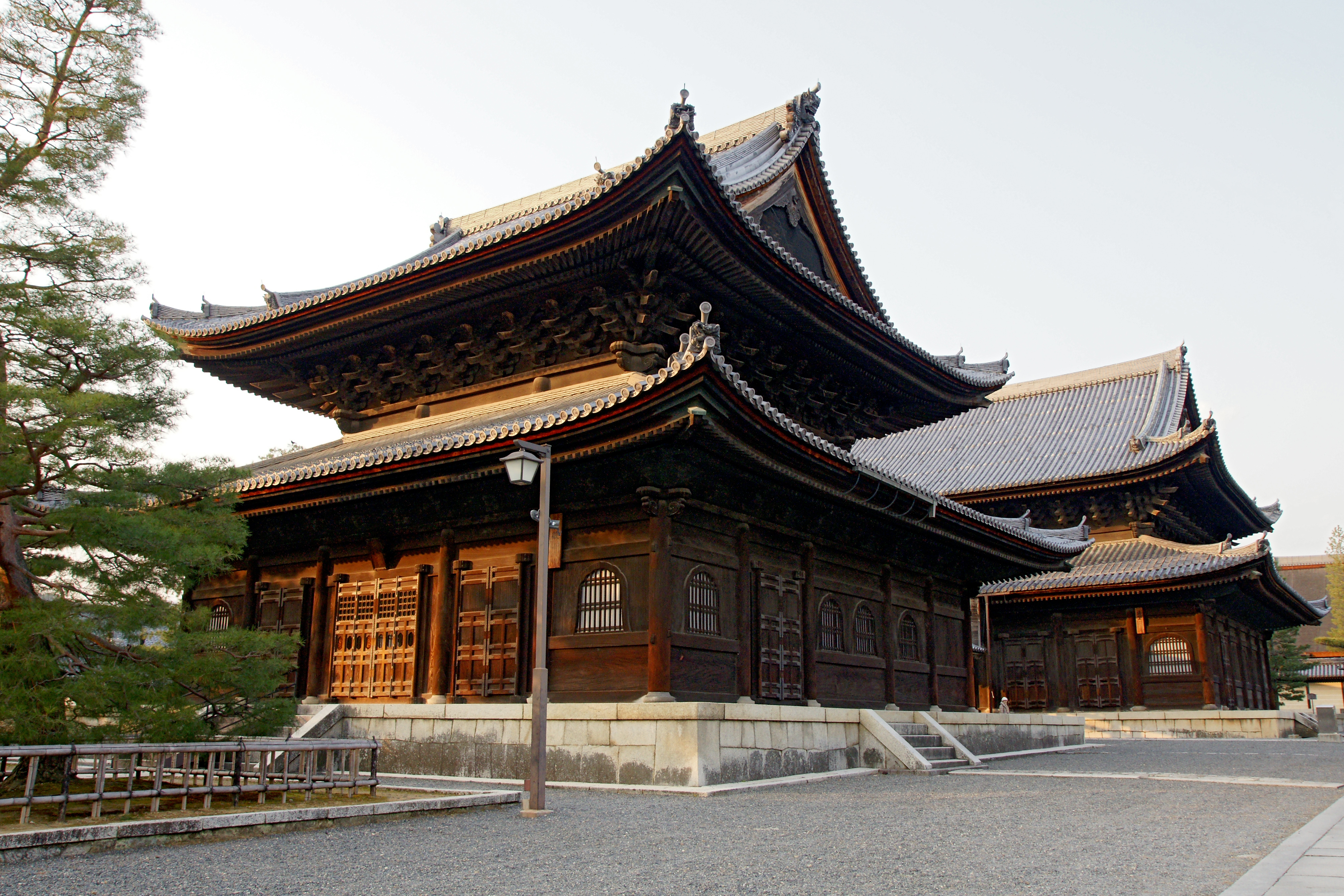
Butsuden and Hattō

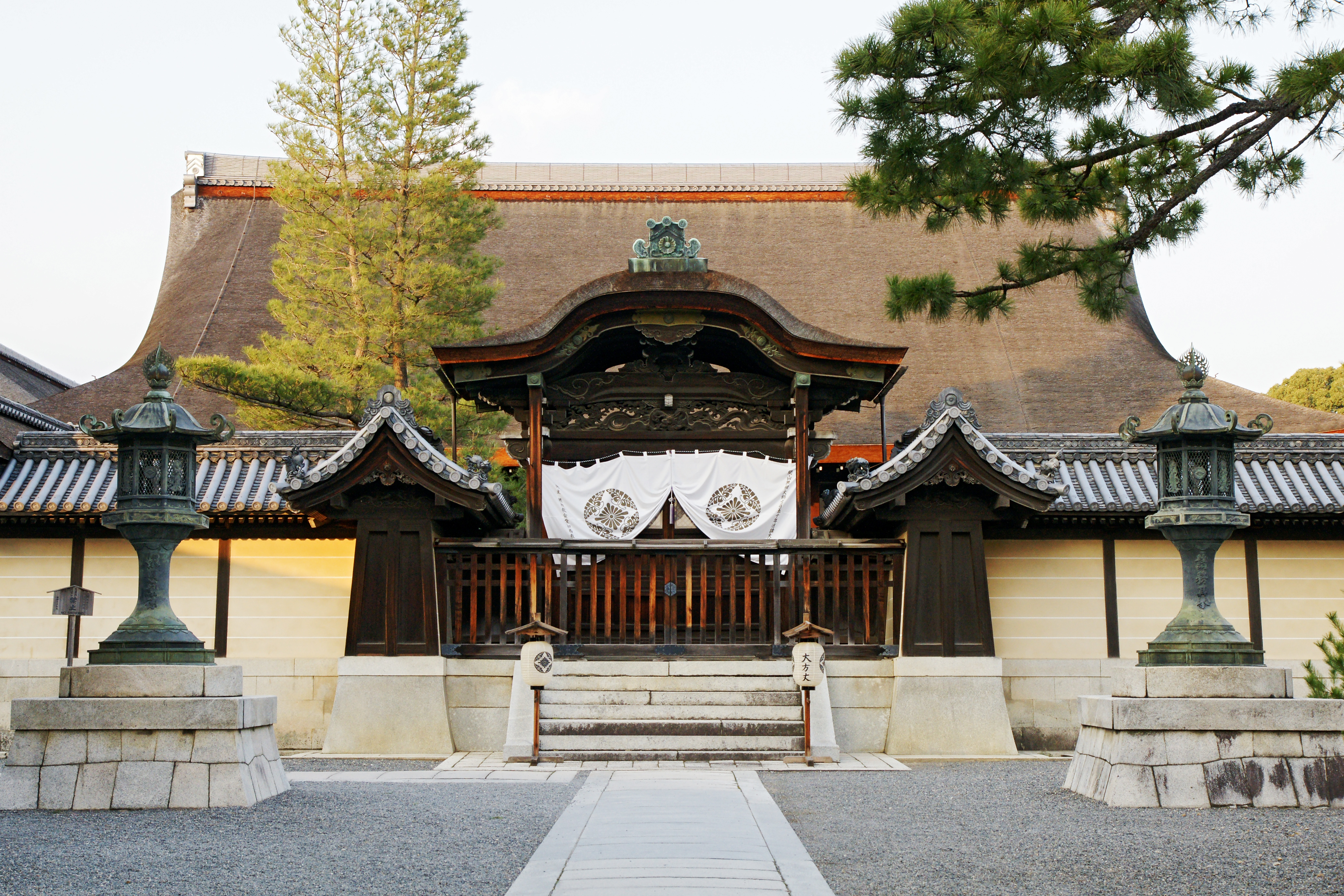
Dai-hōjō

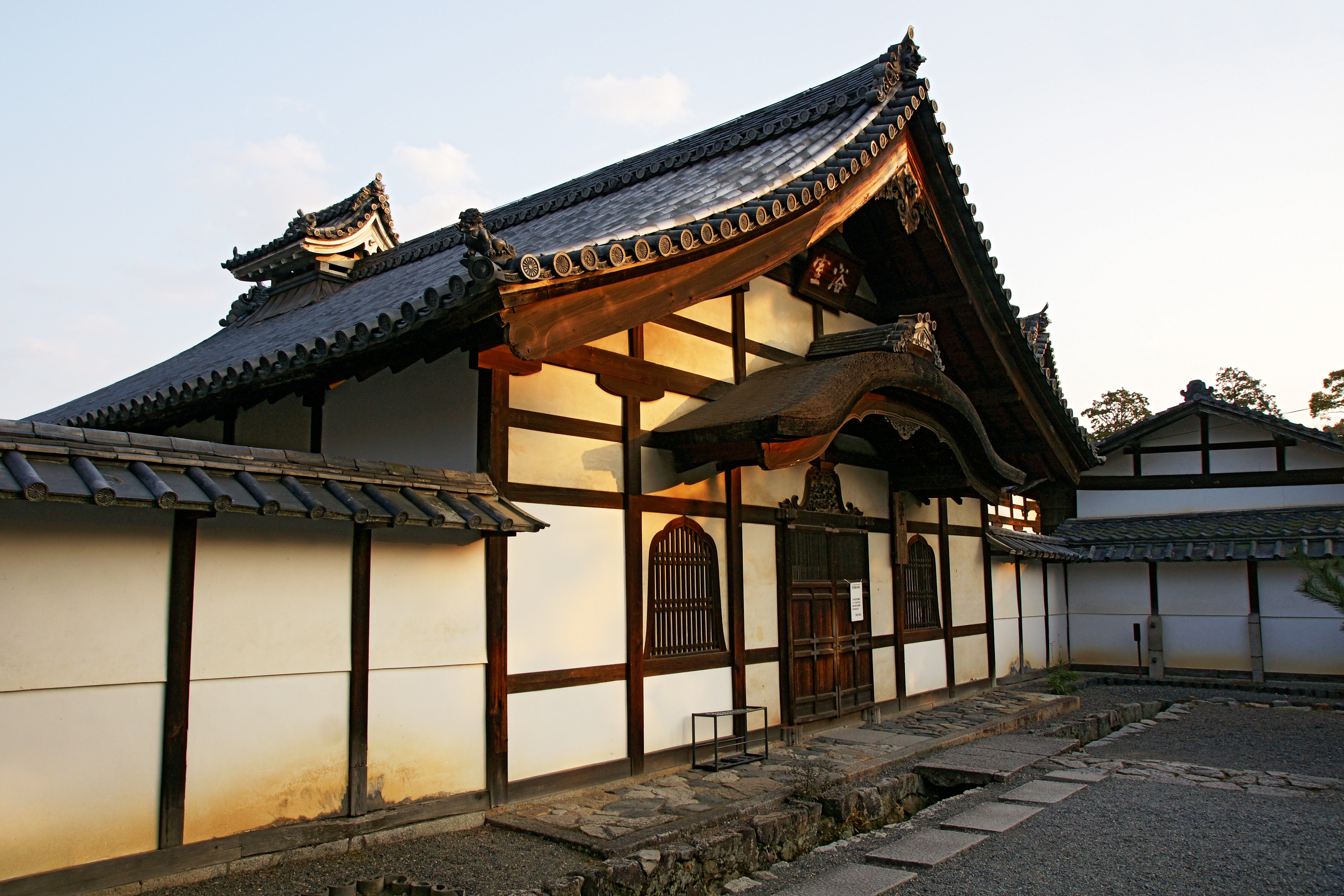
Yokushitsu

== Directions ==
The complex is located between Ichijō Street (一条通, ichijō-dōri; first street) to the north and shimodachiuri-dōri (下立売通) to the south, and can be entered from the north or south through corresponding main gates. There are also side entrances that do not pass through a gate. On the south side of Myōshin-ji there is a large gate that is not open, as it is a chokushi-mon (勅使門; imperial envoy gate), hence only opened for imperial envoys, but next to it is the main south gate (南総門, minami-sōmon). Just inside both the North and South Gates are small information booths, providing maps and directions.

A number of train stations are located nearby:

- Myōshin-ji Station and Ryōan-ji Station on the Randen line, near the North Gate
- Hanazono Station on the JR Sagano Line, near the South Gate

== Sub-temples ==
There are more than 40 sub-temples (塔頭, tatchū) of the main temple (Myōshin-ji states 46, but lists 49), of which 30-odd are within the grounds of the main complex, and 10 are in the surrounding area. These include:

Within the grounds
Open year-round

- Taizō-in (退蔵院) – most noted sub-temple, garden and ink paintings
- Shunkō-in (春光院) – connections with Christianity and with Buddhist philosophy, meditation in English
- Daishin-in (大心院) – rock garden "aum garden" (阿吽の庭, aun no niwa), shukubo
- Keishun-in (桂春院) – tea garden (matcha tea served)
- Reiun-in (霊雲院) -- pocket rock garden

Seasonal openings

- Tōrin-in – seasonal openings (parts of January, July, and October), year-round shukubo and shōjin-ryōri
- Daihō-in 大法院 – spring and autumn openings (new leaves and autumn leaves: early April through early May, and November, respectively)

Limited admission (conditions apply)

- Daiyū-in 大雄院

Closed to public

(Others)

Off the grounds
Open to the public

- Ryōan-ji – short walk away, world-famous rock garden, UNESCO World Heritage Site

Limited admission

- Eshō-in 慧照院 – just south of main grounds, limited admission; seasonal opening for camellia garden in late April
- Seigen-in 西源院 – just south of Ryōan-ji, limited admission

Closed to the public

(Others)

== Affiliated temples ==
Temples in the Myōshin-ji school, but not sub-temples of the main complex include:

- Enshō-ji (Nara)
- Sōken-ji (Azuchi)
- Zuiryū-ji (Gifu)
- Shōgen-ji (Gifu)
- Erin-ji (Yamanashi)
- Bairin-ji (Kurume)

== School ==
Hanazono University, the Rinzai-School university, was established by Myōshin-ji in 1872, and is located some distance to the southeast of the temple complex. In the southeast corner of the square plot of the temple complex proper is the associated Hanazono High School, just across a small river.

== Abbots ==
Abbots have included:

- Kanzan Egen (關山慧玄; 1277–1360), founder and first abbot
- Gudō Toshoku (愚堂東寔; 1577–1661), thrice abbot
- Gotō Zuigan (後藤 瑞巌; 1879–1965)

== See also ==
- List of National Treasures of Japan (crafts-others)
- List of National Treasures of Japan (writings)
- Ichibata Yakushi Kyodan

== Bibliography ==
- "Japanese Rinzai Zen Buddhism. Myoshinji, a living religion" Jørn Borup, Brill, ISBN 978-90-04-16557-1
- "Gardens For All: Myoshinji: Zen gardens wondrous to behold, and not", The Japan Times, March 28, 2002, by Gerard Taaffe
- Buswell, Robert Jr; Lopez, Donald S. Jr., eds. (2013). Princeton Dictionary of Buddhism. Princeton, NJ: Princeton University Press, p. 559. ISBN 9780691157863.
