= Saikan =

Shinto shrine in Yamagata Prefecture, Japan

Saikan (斎館)
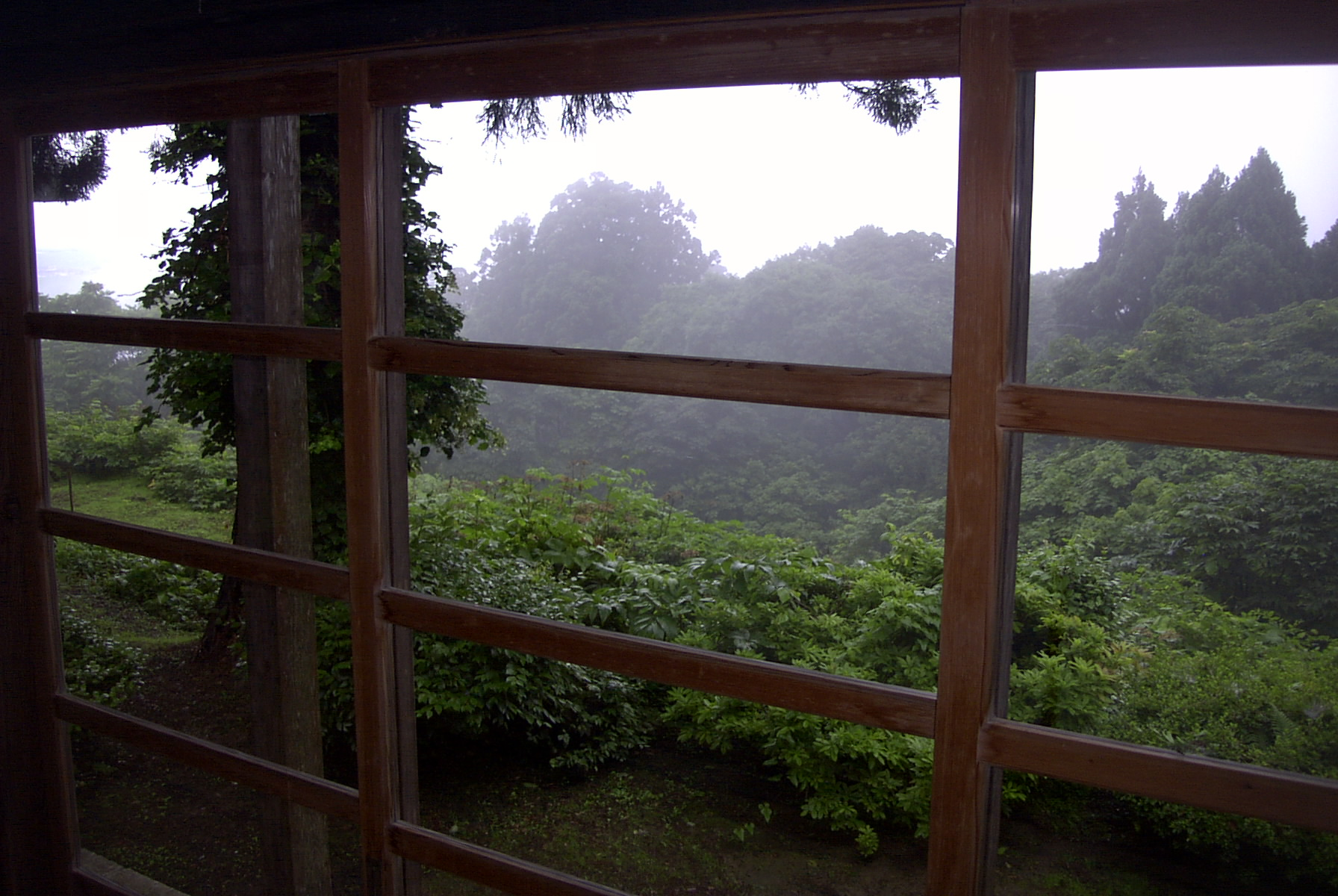
- A twisting hallway in Saikan.

- Location within Japan

Religion
- Affiliation: Shinto

Location
- Coordinates: 38°42′12″N 139°58′48″E

Saikan (斎館, Saikan) is a sprawling temple lodging atop Mt. Haguro (羽黒山 Haguro-san), part of the Three Mountains of Dewa (出羽三山 Dewa Sanzan) in Yamagata Prefecture, Japan. It was previously known as Kezō-in (華蔵院).

== Layout ==
Saikan connects directly to the main temple of the complex through a long passageway that climbs further up the mountain.

== Accommodation ==
Elaborate Gohonbo Bassho-zen meals are served to visitors.

== Access ==
Traditionally, the lodgings are reached by climbing up 2,466 stone steps up the side of the mountain, but it can also be reached by car or bus.

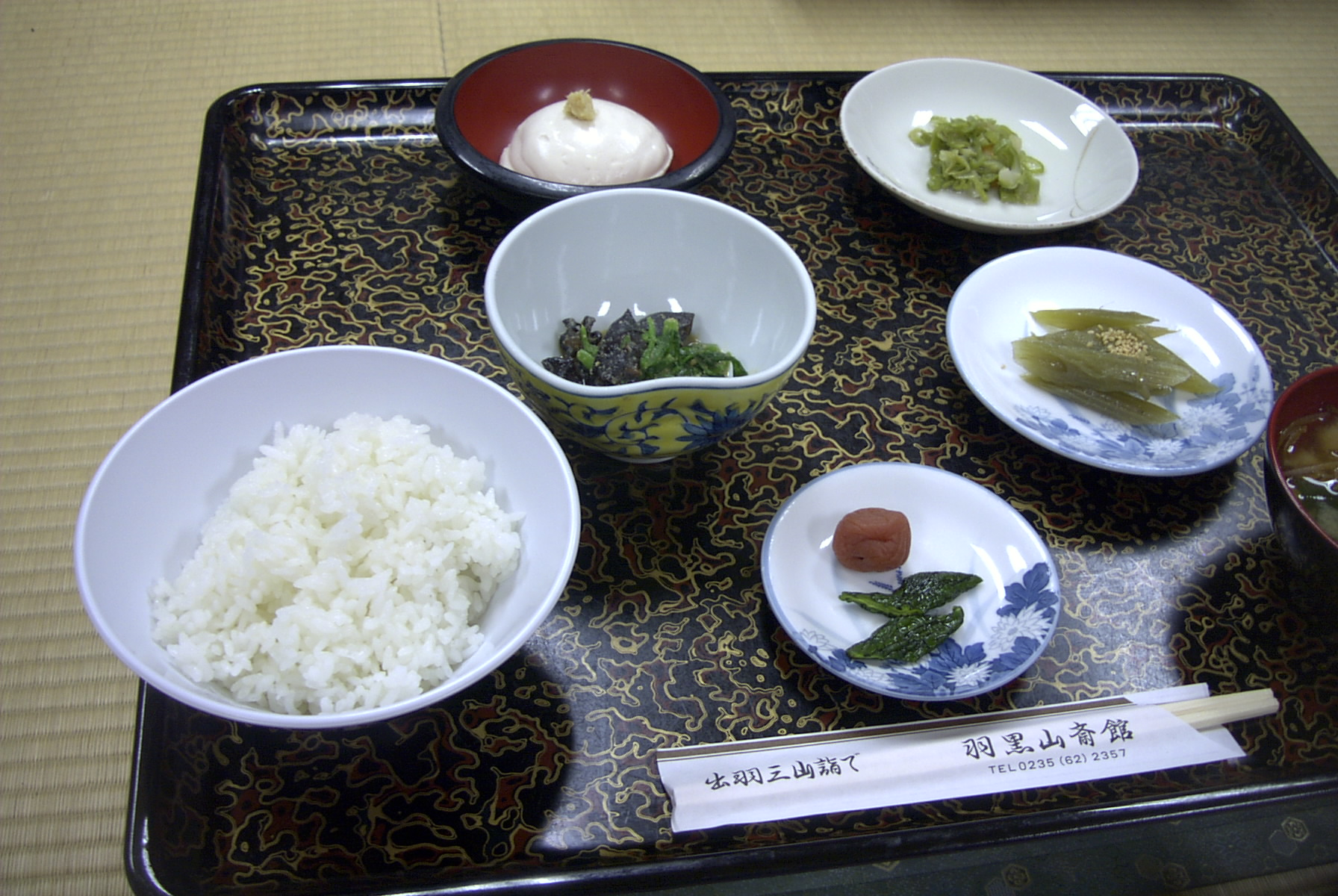
A simple breakfast.

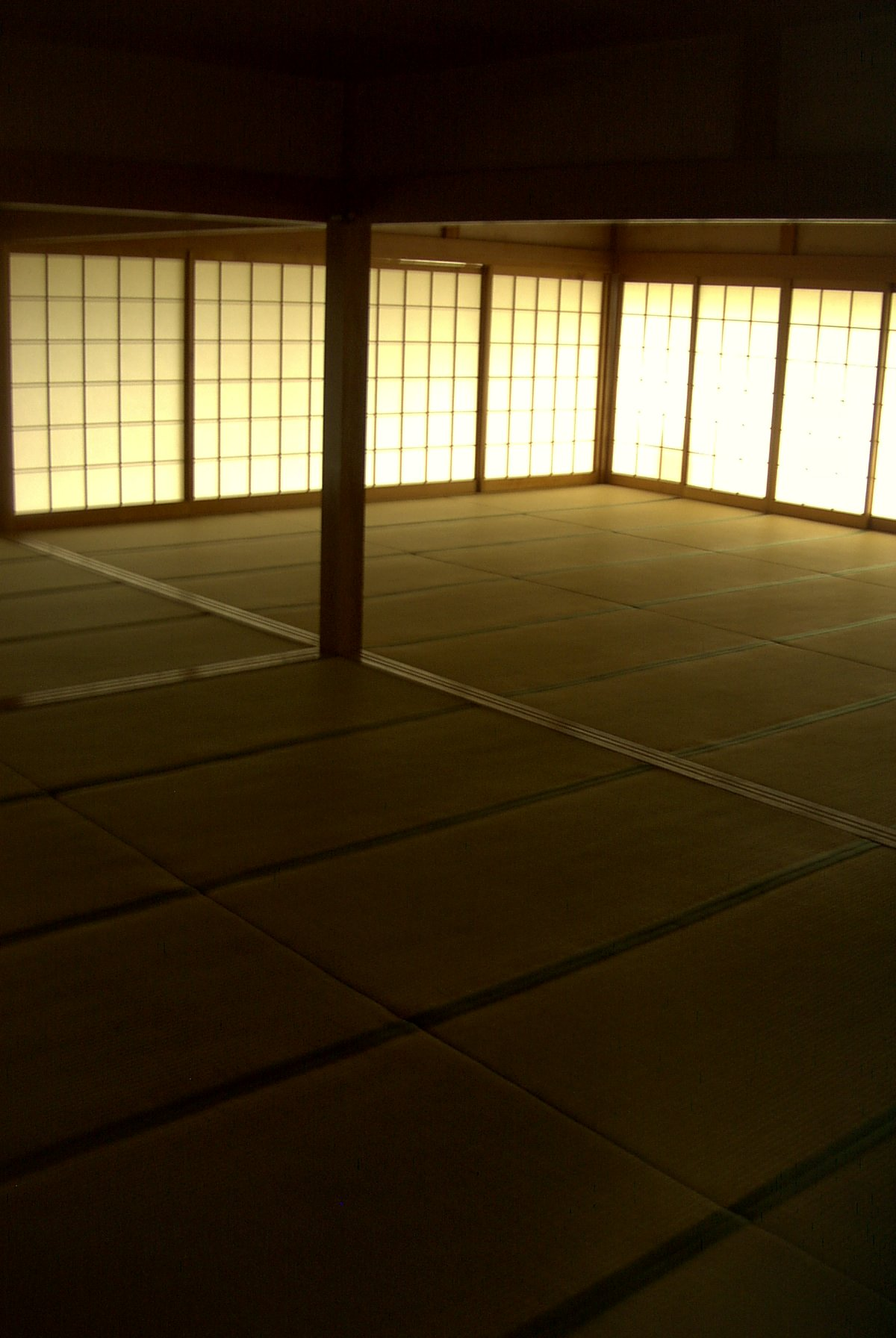
One of many large tatami rooms for guests.

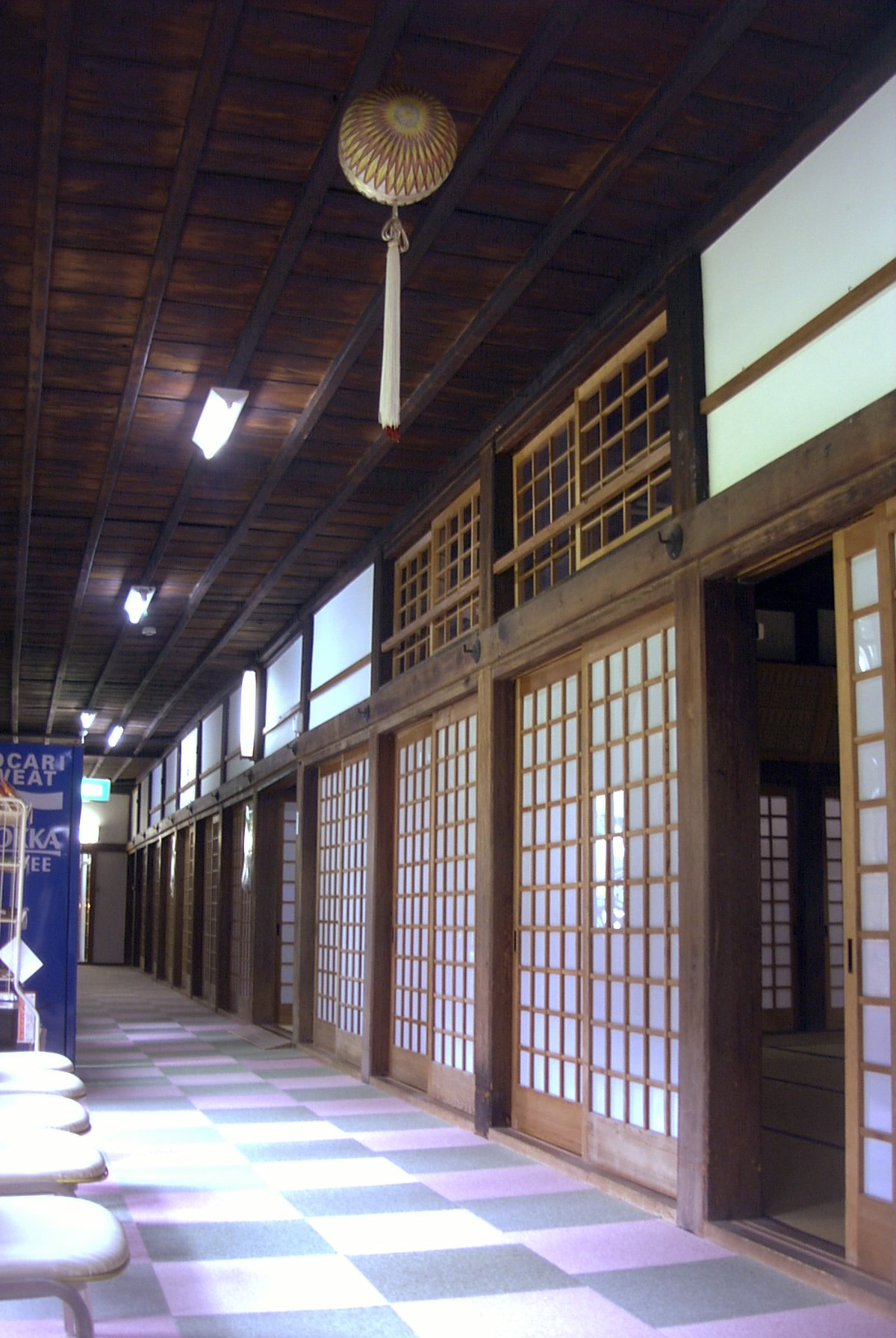
Hallway.
