= Ichibata Yakushi Kyodan =

Buddhist school of thought

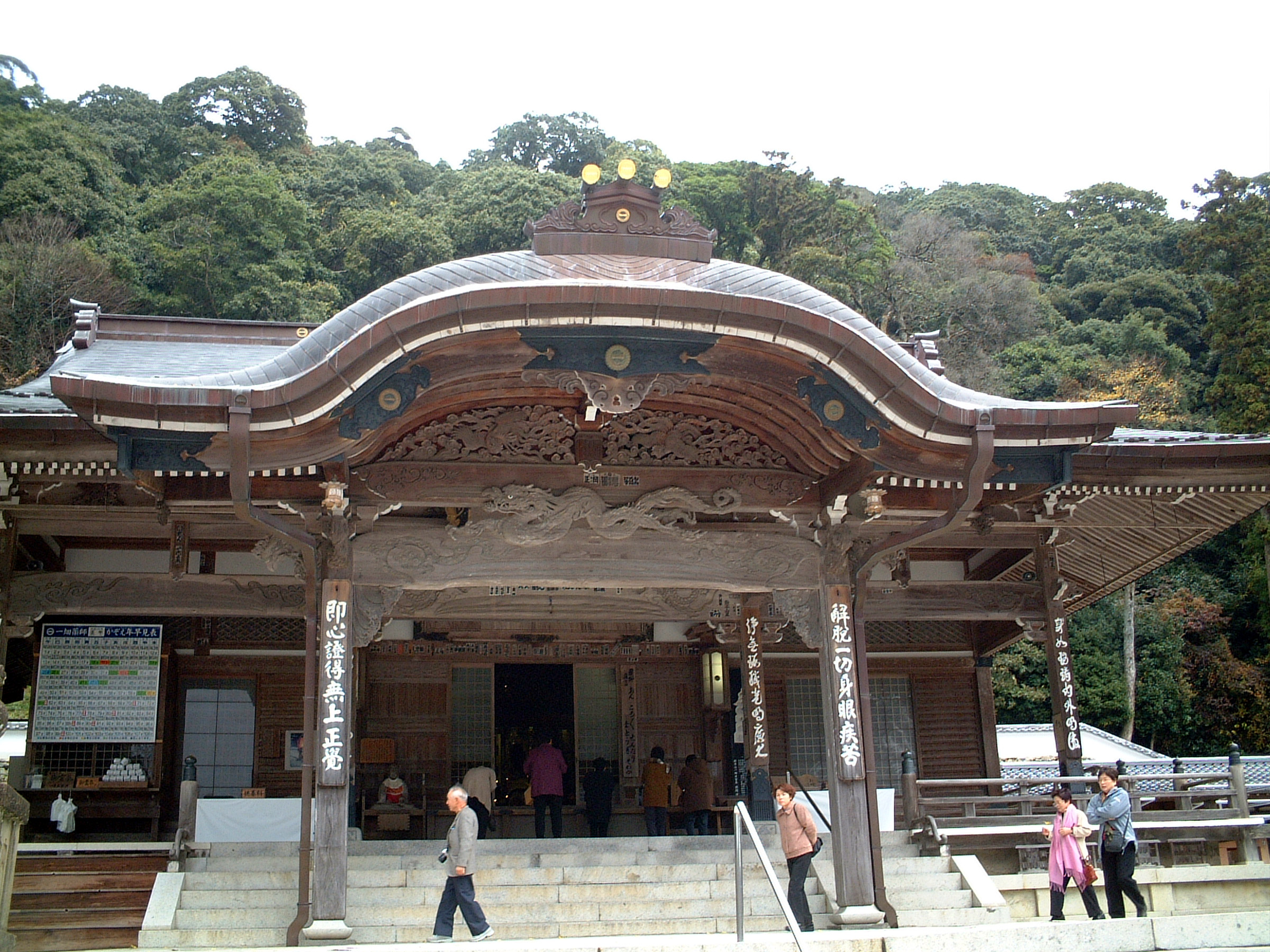
Ichibataji

Ichibata Yakushi Kyōdan is an independent school of Buddhism in Japan which places great importance on what they term genze riyaku (faith) in Yakushi (Medicine Buddha). Previously affiliated with the Tendai and then the Myōshin-ji branch of Rinzai school of Zen sect, today the school is still considered a part of the Rinzai despite having little in common with them. The school's various temples have become known as places where people can come to have their eyes healed. Its main temple is Ichibata Yakushi, and as of 1984 it had 31 temples with approximately 195,783 adherents.

== See also ==
- Buddhism in Japan
