= Shukubo =

Japanese Buddhist lodging

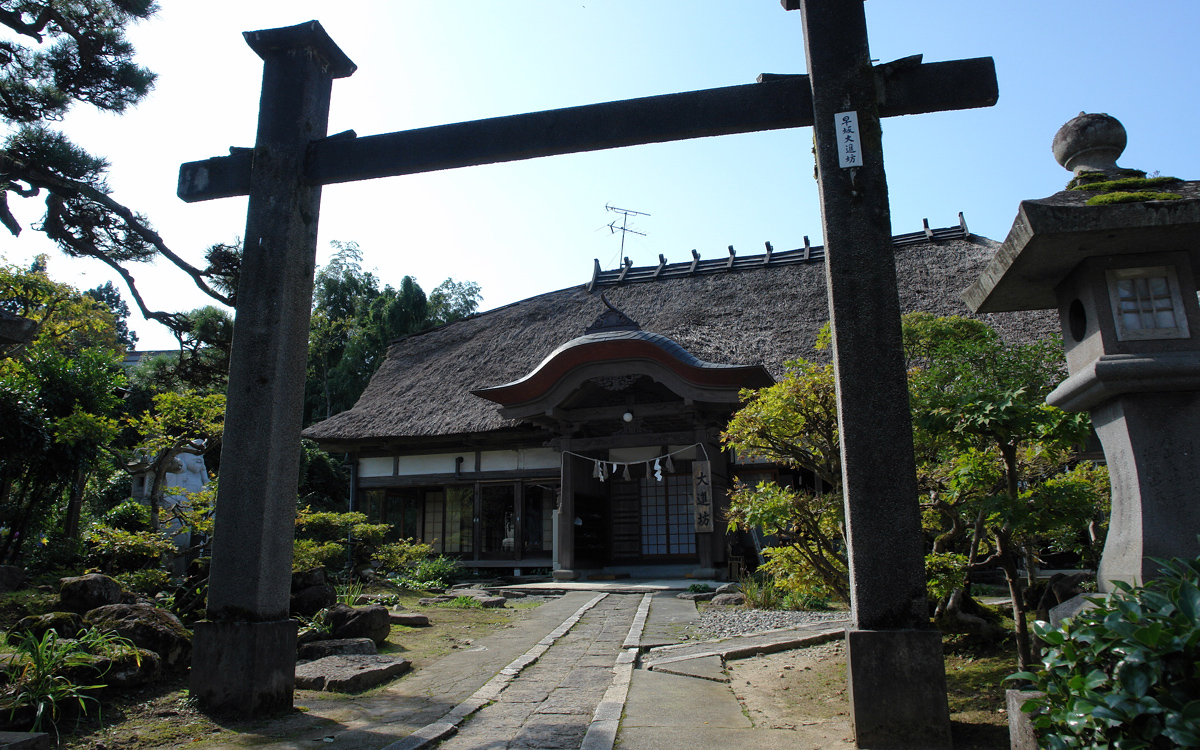
Lodging in Hagurosan

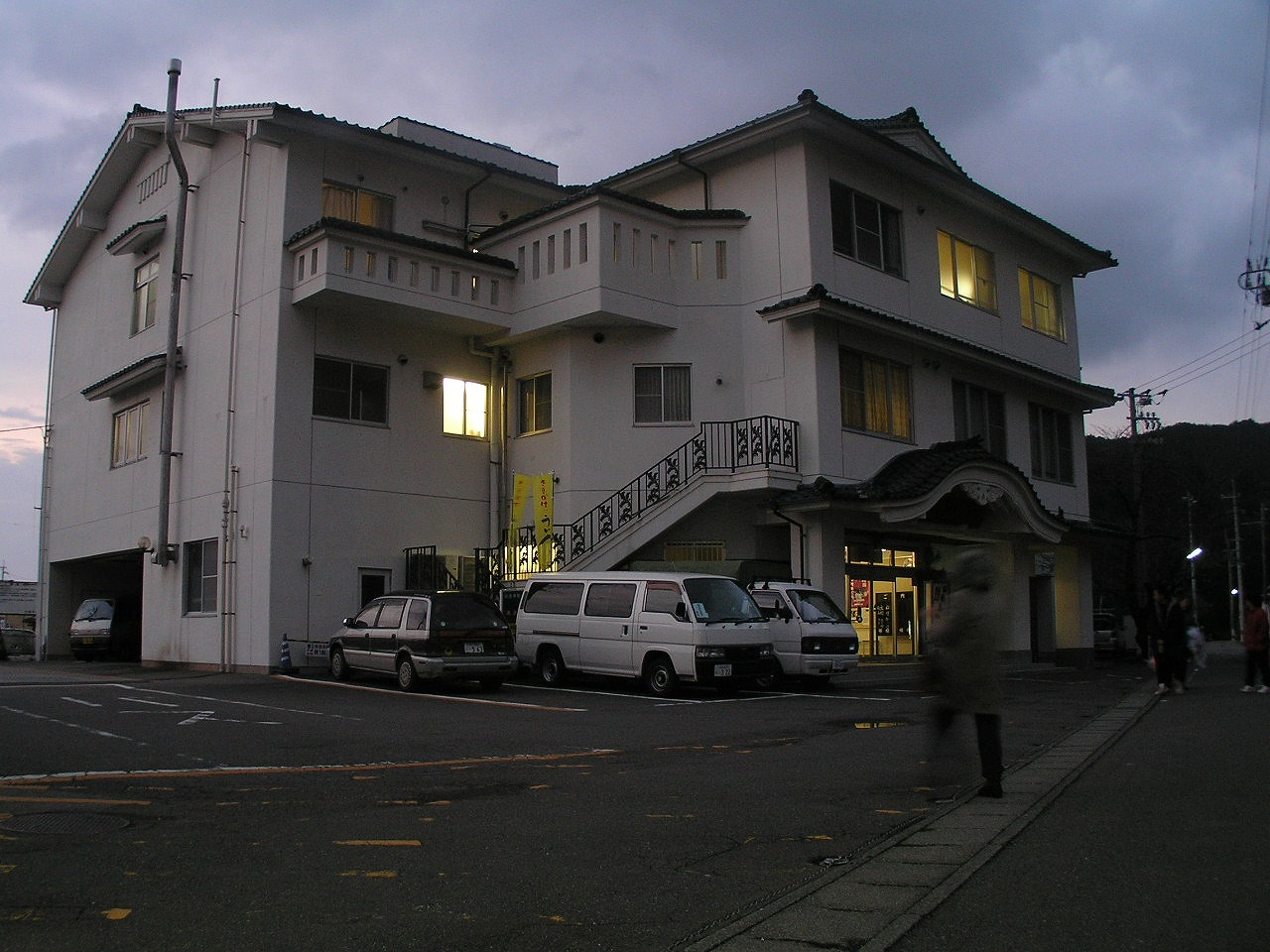
The former lodging house at Yakuoji, the 23rd sacred site of The 88 sacred sites of Shikoku.

A shukubo (宿坊) is a temple lodging in Japan that allows visitors to stay overnight within a Buddhist temple. Originally these facilities were designed to accommodate only monks and worshippers, but nowadays, in response to declining numbers of monk visitors, most facilities accept general tourists. Some temples, such as the ones in Mount Kōya, have open-air baths with onsen. Shukubo are now considered semi-secularized and in many towns are the only accommodations available.

== History ==
Originally, shukubo were used by bhikku and confraternities, and later by lay practitioners of Shugendō and mountain worship, and played major roles in the development of the latter two. At the foot of Mount Haguro there were once 336 shukubo all linked to Shugendō.

Networks of shukubo began to develop in Ise, Shima, Toba, and Futami in a decades long construction boom.

In the Edo period, visits to temples and shrines became popular, including visits to Ise, Kotohira-gū, and Zenkō-ji. Lodging houses were built at major temples and shrines in each area to accommodate ordinary pilgrims and tourists, forming a kind of tourism business, with specific areas connected to specific lodging houses.

In modern times, some shukubo have been converted into traditional inns and ryokan for tourists who want to experience the atmosphere of a temple. Many modern-day operators of shukubo are descendants of families that ran shukubo when they were purely religious. Originally, they only operated for one kosha but opening to the general public has substantially increased amounts of people staying at shukubo.

== Gallery ==
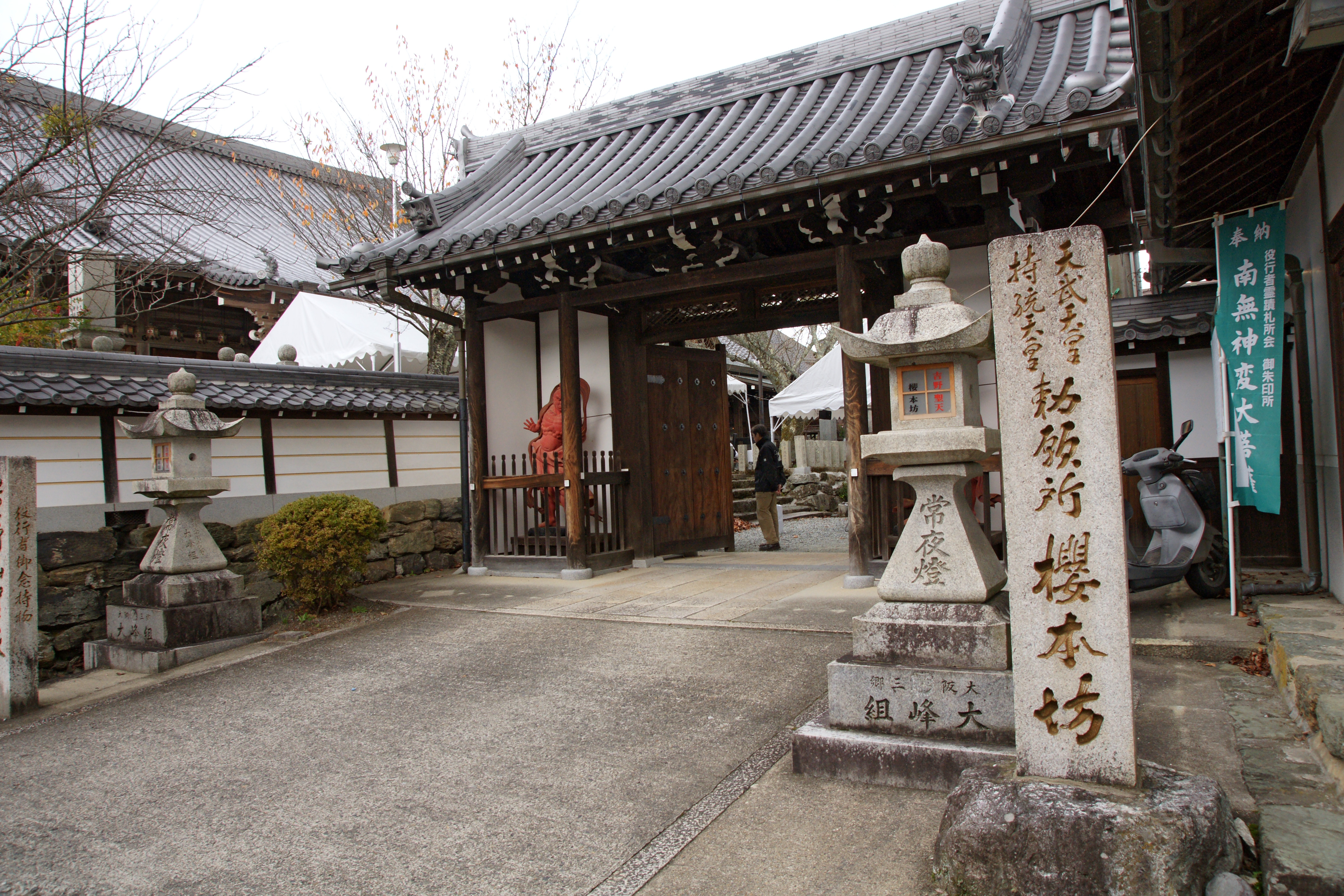
Sakuramotobō

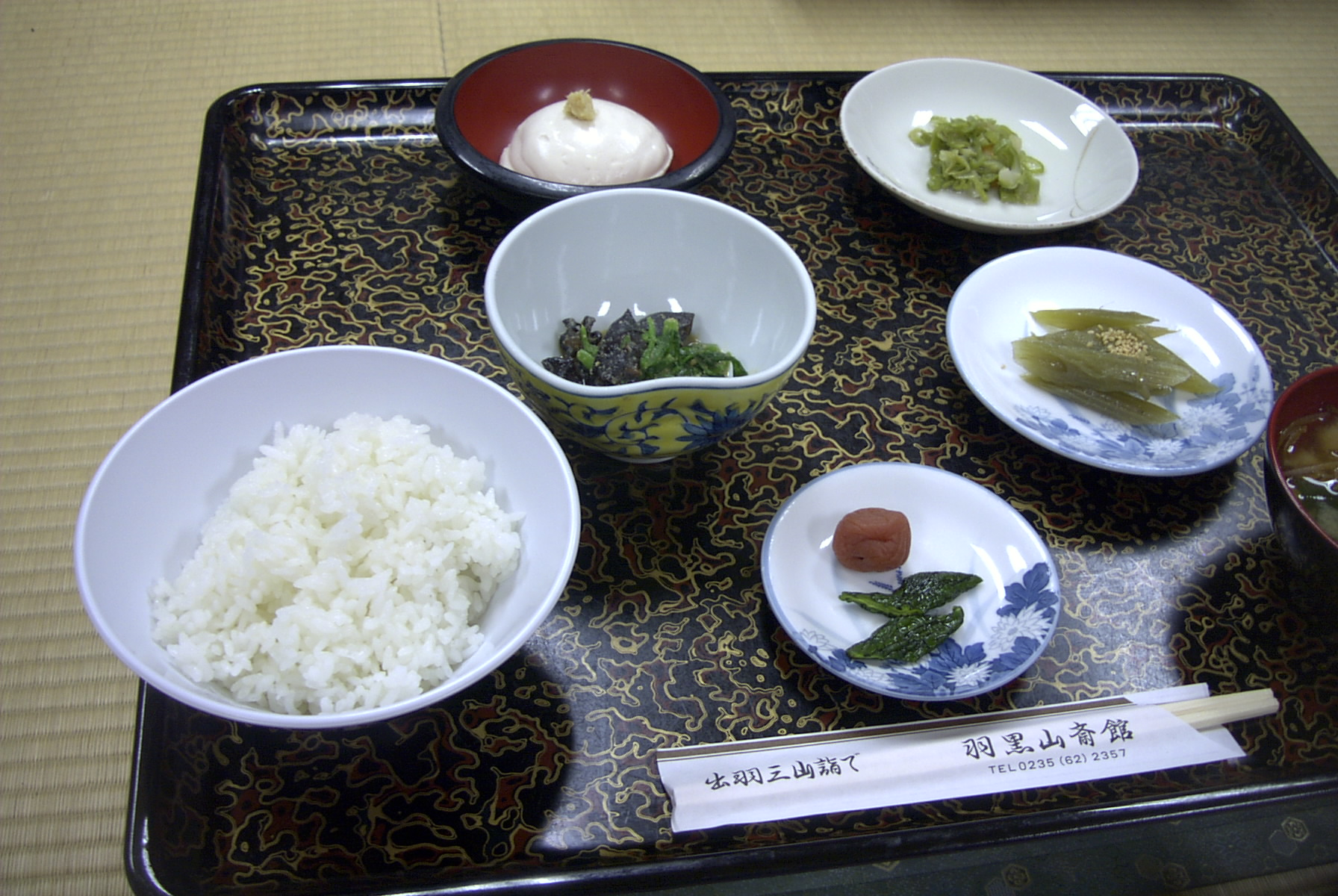
Shōjin ryōri at Hagurosan Saikan

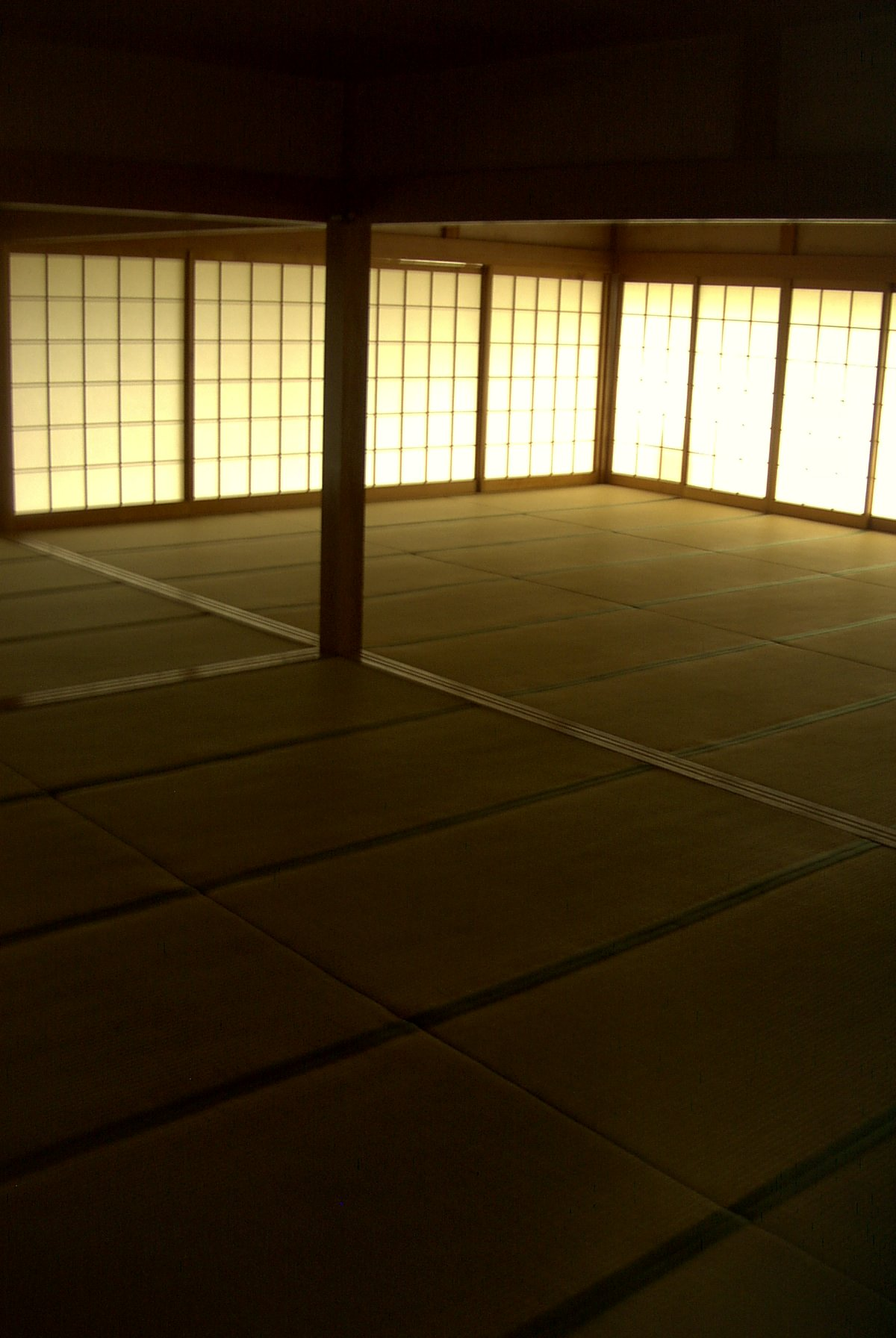
Hagurosan Saikan Room

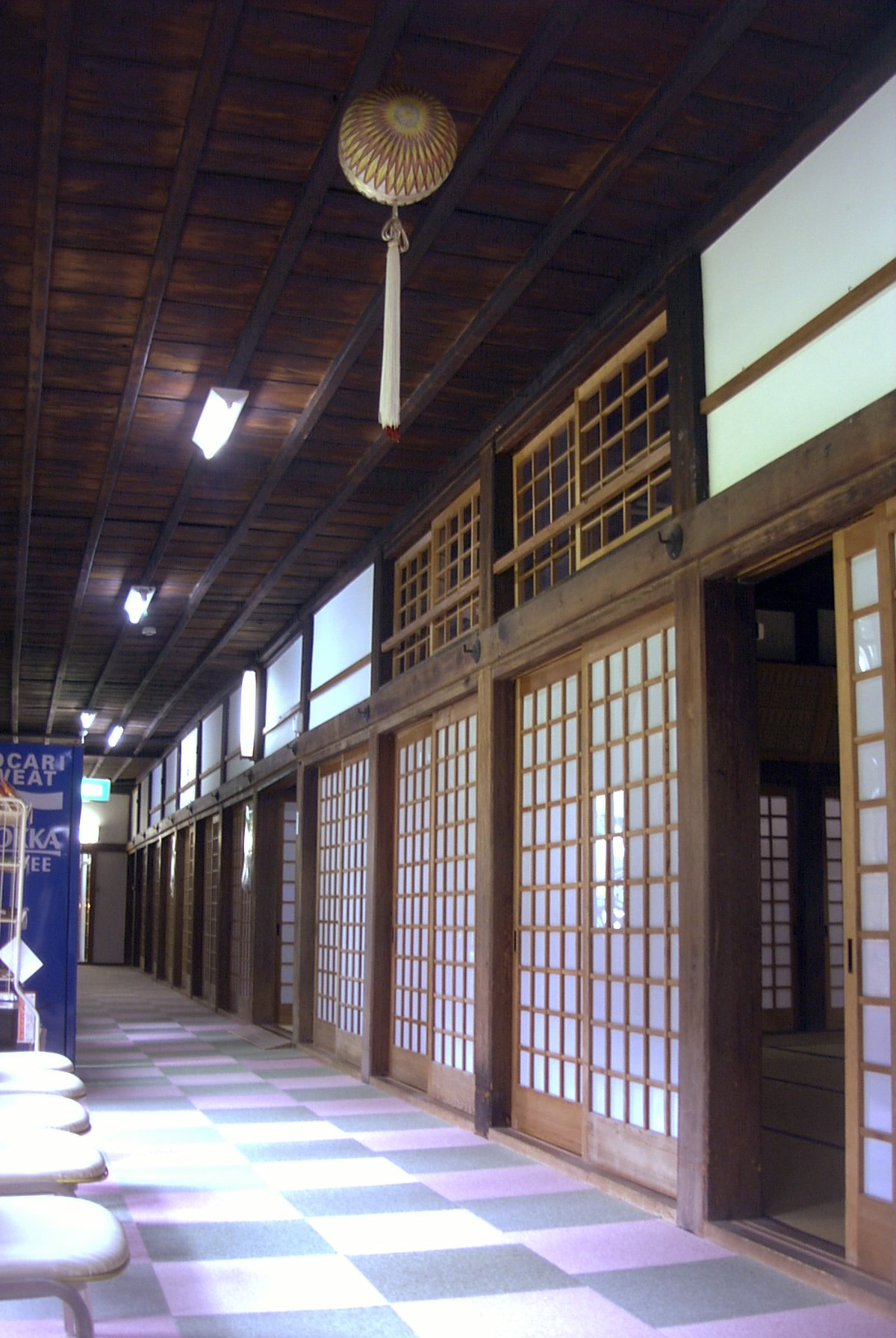
Inside the Hagurosan Saikan lodging house (corridor and rooms)

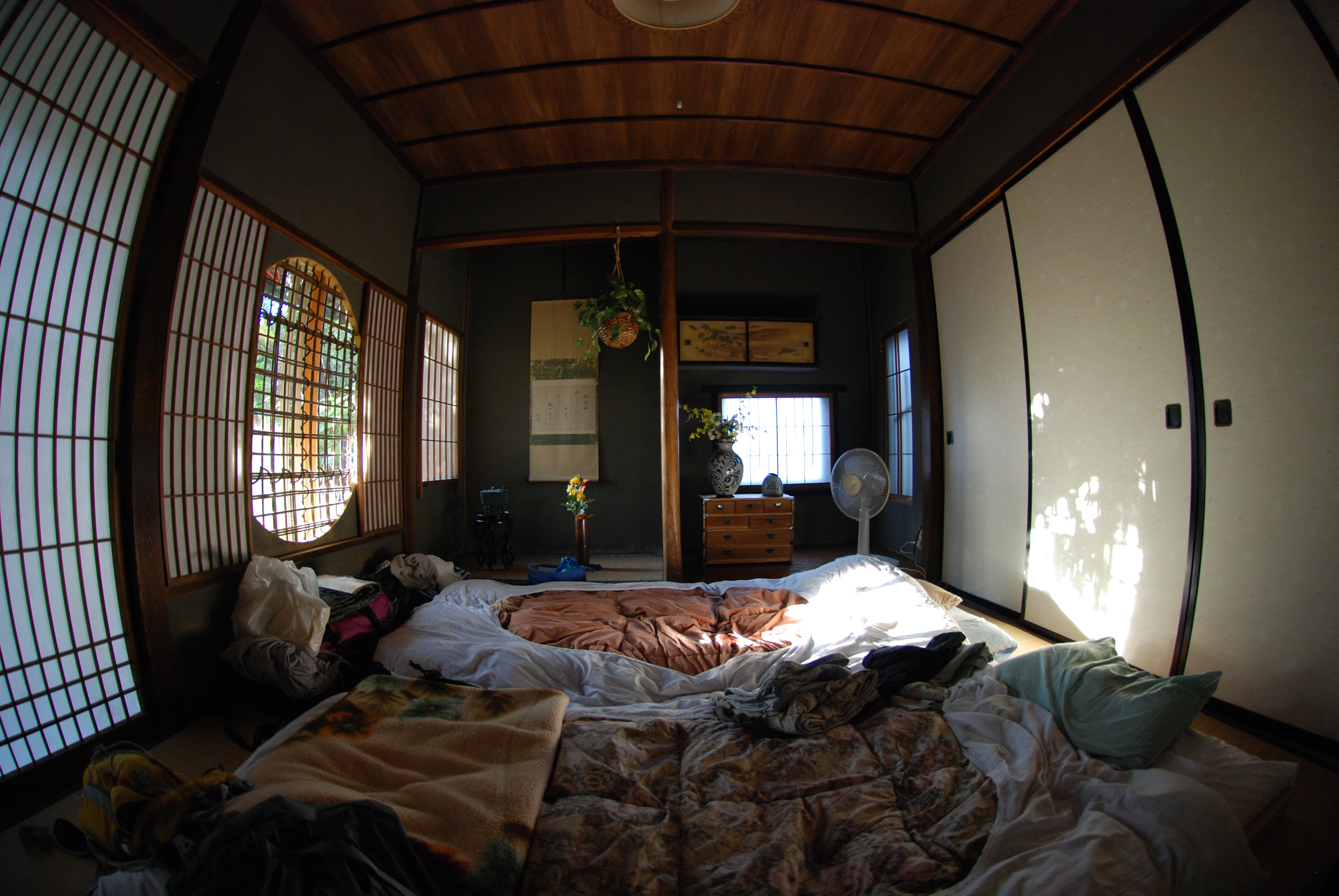
A Japanese-style room in Zenkoji shukubo

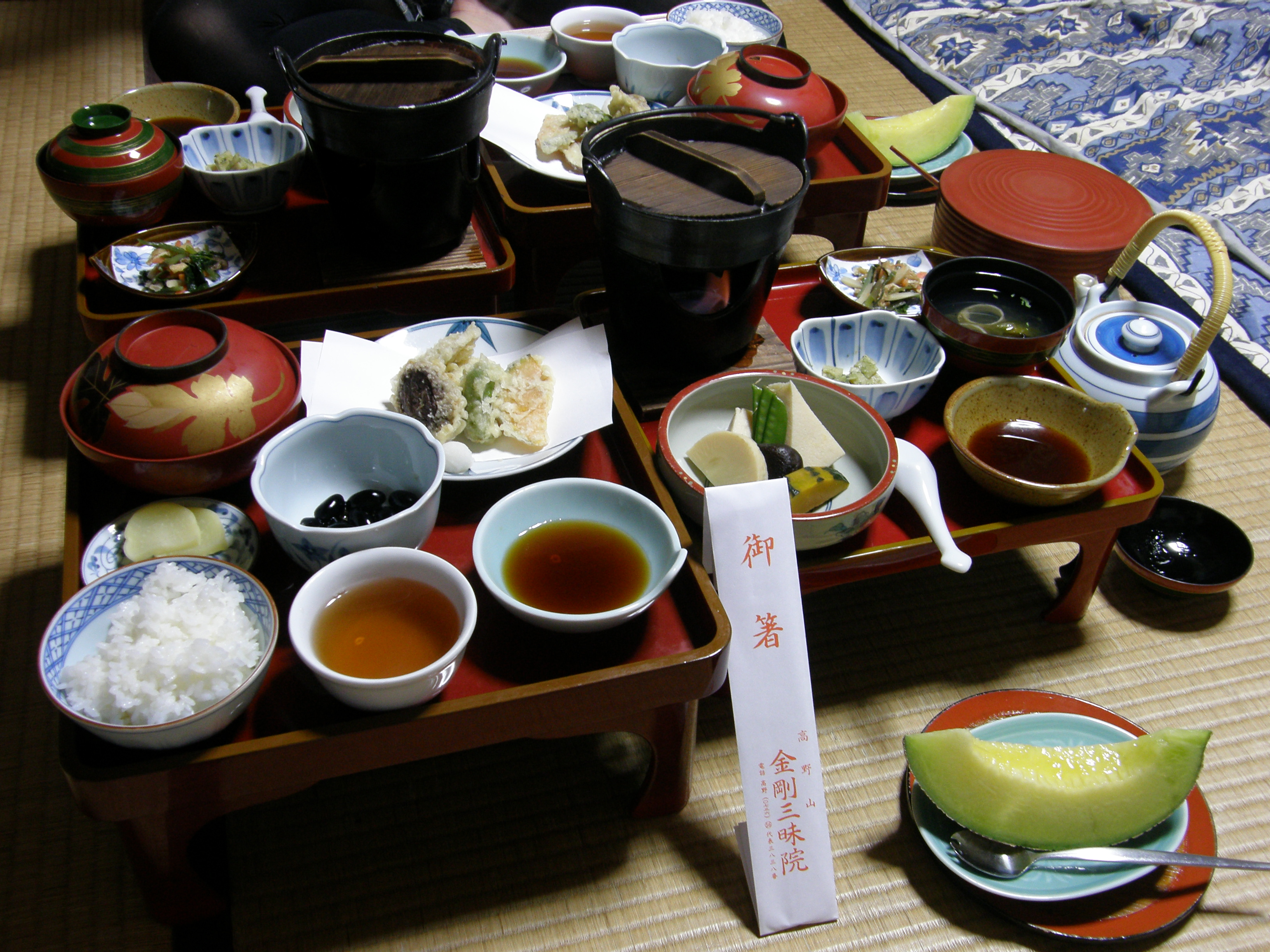
A vegetarian meal served at a shukubo

== See also ==
- Shikoku Pilgrimage
- Mount Kōya
- Three Mountains of Dewa
- Mount Mitake (Tokyo)
