= Hanazono Station (Kyoto) =

Railway station in Kyoto, Japan

Coordinates: 35°1′7.01″N 135°43′4.01″E

Hanazono Station 花園駅
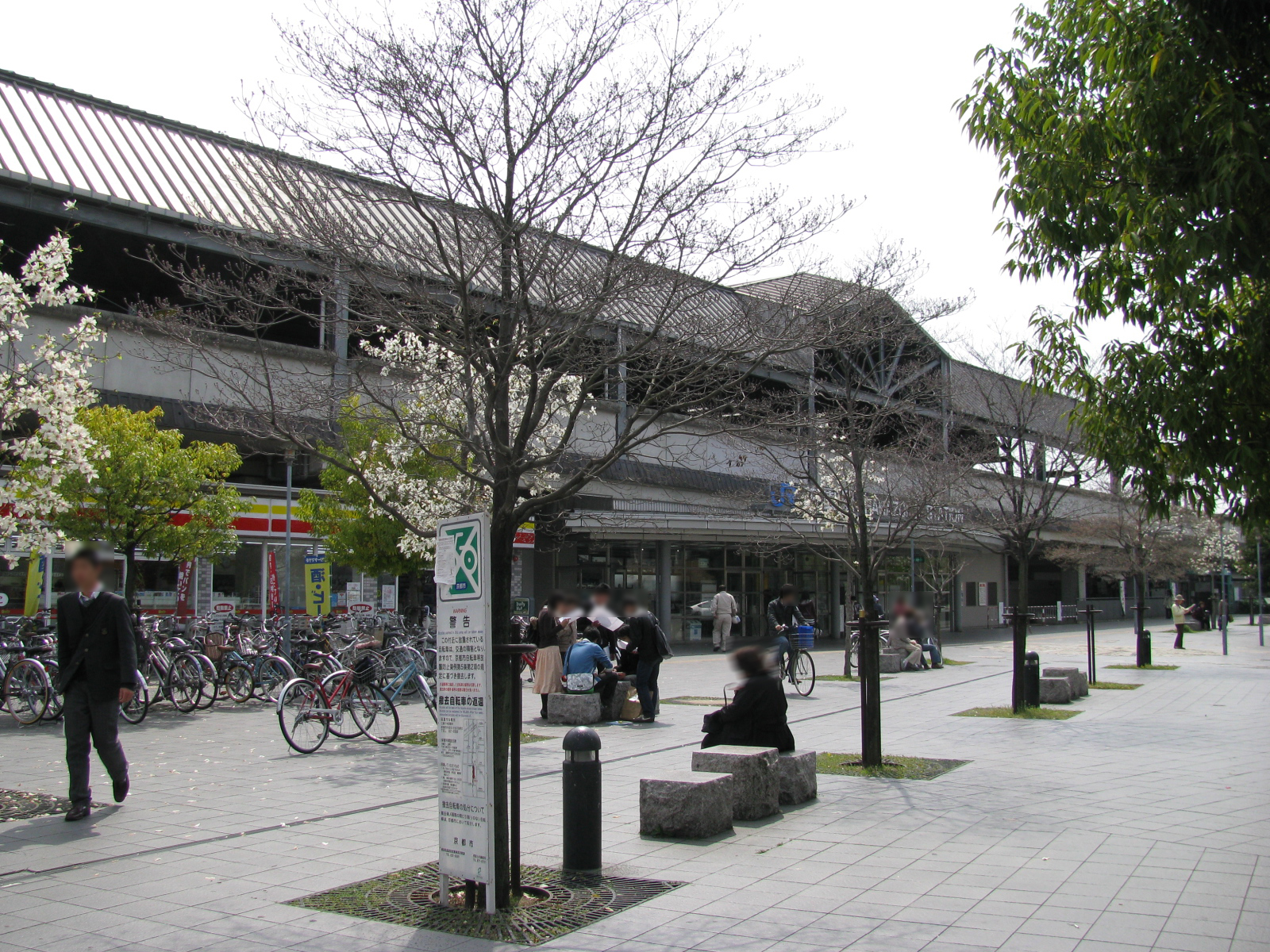

General information
- Location: Ukyō, Kyoto, Kyoto; Japan
- Operator: JR West
- Line: Sagano Line
- Platforms: Island platform
- Tracks: 2
- Connections: Bus stop

Construction
- Structure type: Elevated
- Accessible: Yes

Other information
- Station code: JR-E06

History
- Opened: 1898

Passengers
- FY 2023: 7,578 daily

Services
Preceding station	JR West	Following station
Uzumasa towards Sonobe	Sagano Line Local	Emmachi towards Kyoto
Location

Hanazono Station (花園駅, Hanazono-eki) is a train station in Ukyo-ku, Kyoto, Japan. The station (and surrounding neighborhood) are named for Emperor Hanazono, who had a palace in the area, now the Myōshin-ji temple complex.

== Line ==
- West Japan Railway Company (JR West)
  - Sagano Line (Sanin Main Line)

== Layout ==
The elevated station has an island platform with two tracks.

1	■ Sagano Line	for Kyoto
2	■ Sagano Line	for Kameoka, Sonobe and Fukuchiyama

== History ==
Hanazono Station opened on 1 January 1898, less than one year after the opening of the Kyoto Railway (predecessor of the San'in Main Line).

Station numbering was introduced in March 2018 with Hanazono being assigned station number JR-E06.

== Surrounding area ==
Just to the north and east is the major temple complex of Myōshin-ji, and the affiliated Hanazono University (to the east, actually closer to Emmachi Station).
