= Sanjō Keihan Station =

Metro station in Kyoto, Japan

T11 Sanjō Keihan Station 三条京阪駅
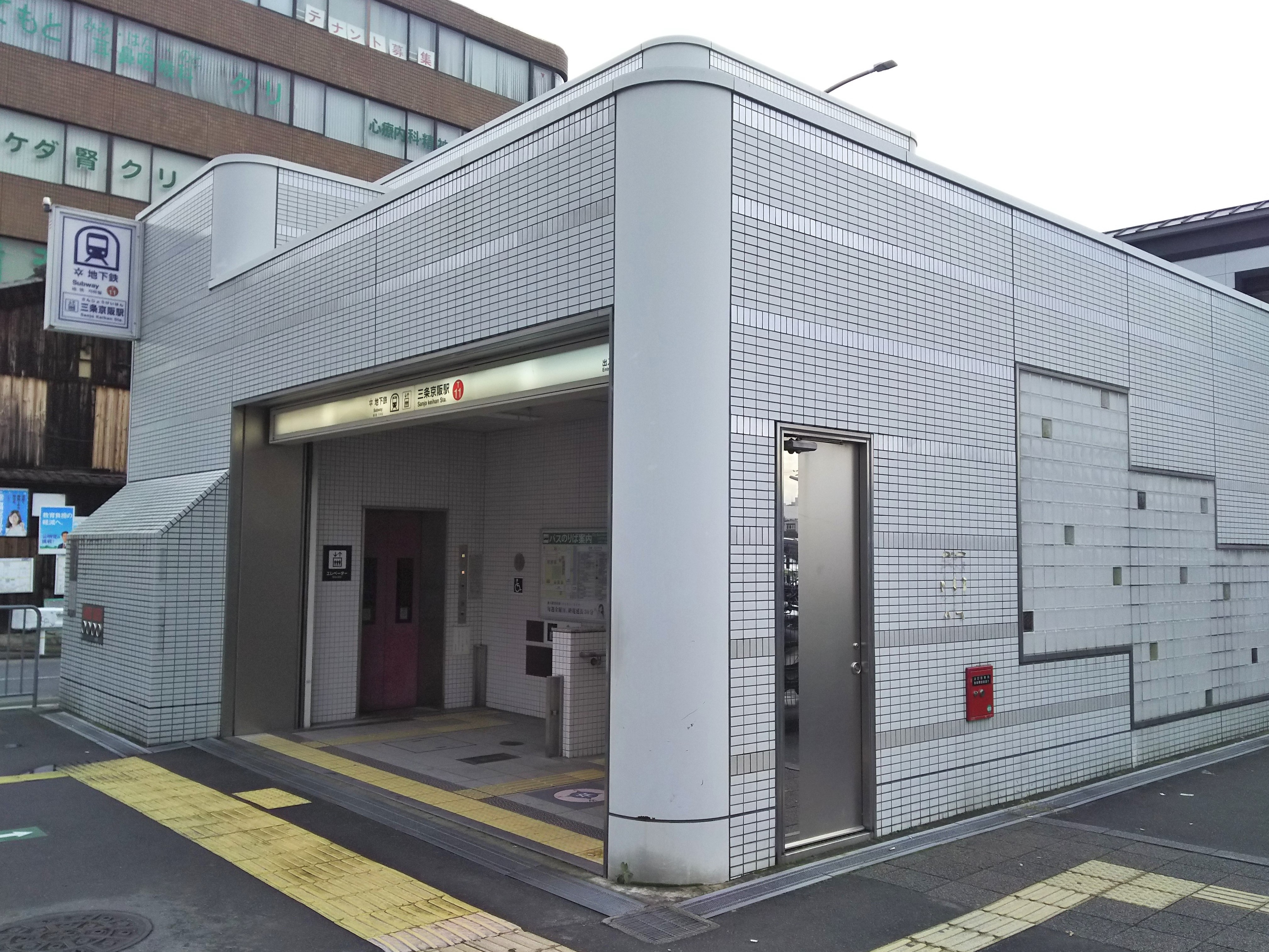
- Entrance No. 2 in 2017

General information
- Location: Ohashicho, Higashiyama, Kyoto, Kyoto （京都市東山区大橋町） Japan
- Coordinates: 35°0′33″N 135°46′25″E
- Operator: Kyoto Municipal Transportation Bureau
- Line: Tōzai Line
- Platforms: 1 island platform
- Tracks: 2
- Connections: Keihan Main Line and Ōtō Line (KH40: Sanjō Station); Bus stop

Other information
- Station code: T11

History
- Opened: 12 October 1997; 28 years ago

Passengers
- FY 2024: 24,994 daily

Services
Preceding station	Kyoto Municipal Subway	Following station
Kyōto Shiyakusho-mae T12 towards Uzumasa Tenjingawa	Tōzai Line	Higashiyama T10 towards Rokujizō
Location

Sanjō Keihan Station (三条京阪駅 Sanjō Keihan-eki) is a subway station in Higashiyama ward, city of Kyoto, Kyoto Prefecture, Japan.

== General information ==
Sanjō Keihan Station intersects with the Keihan Electric Railway's Keihan Main Line, and is connected to the adjacent Keihan Sanjō Station. The station is physically located underneath Sanjō-dori, just east of the Kamo River and Kyoto's Kawaramachi shopping district. It is also the main station in Kyoto for trains to Yodoyabashi Station in Osaka.

== Connecting line ==
- Keihan Railway
  - Keihan Main Line, Ōtō Line (Sanjo Station)

== Layout ==
Sanjō Keihan Station has an island platform with two tracks underground.

1	■ Tōzai Line	for Kyoto Shiyakusho-mae, Karasuma Oike and Uzumasa Tenjingawa
2	■ Tōzai Line	for Misasagi, Rokujizō and (Keihan Railway Keishin Line) Hamaōtsu

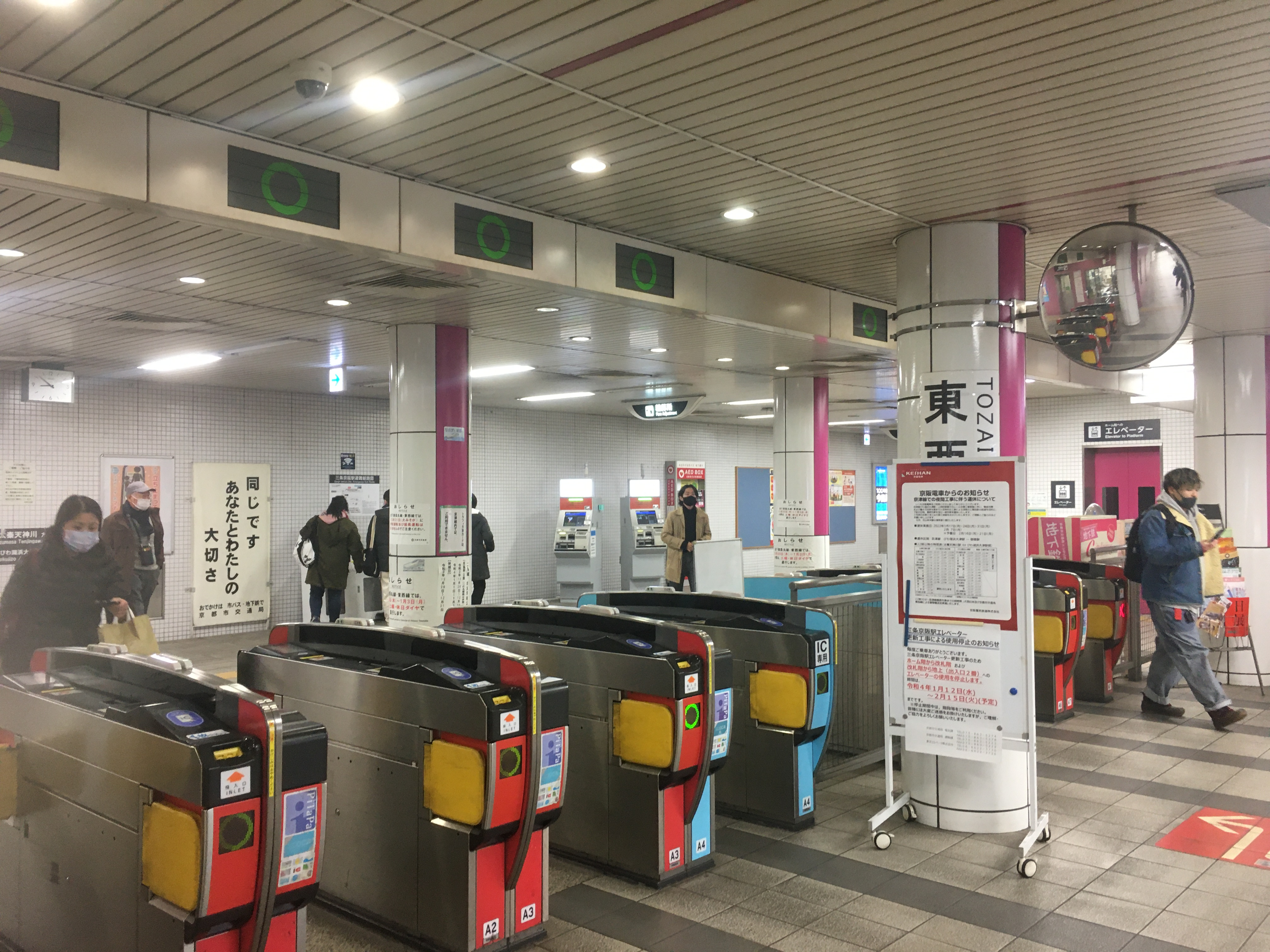
Ticket gates

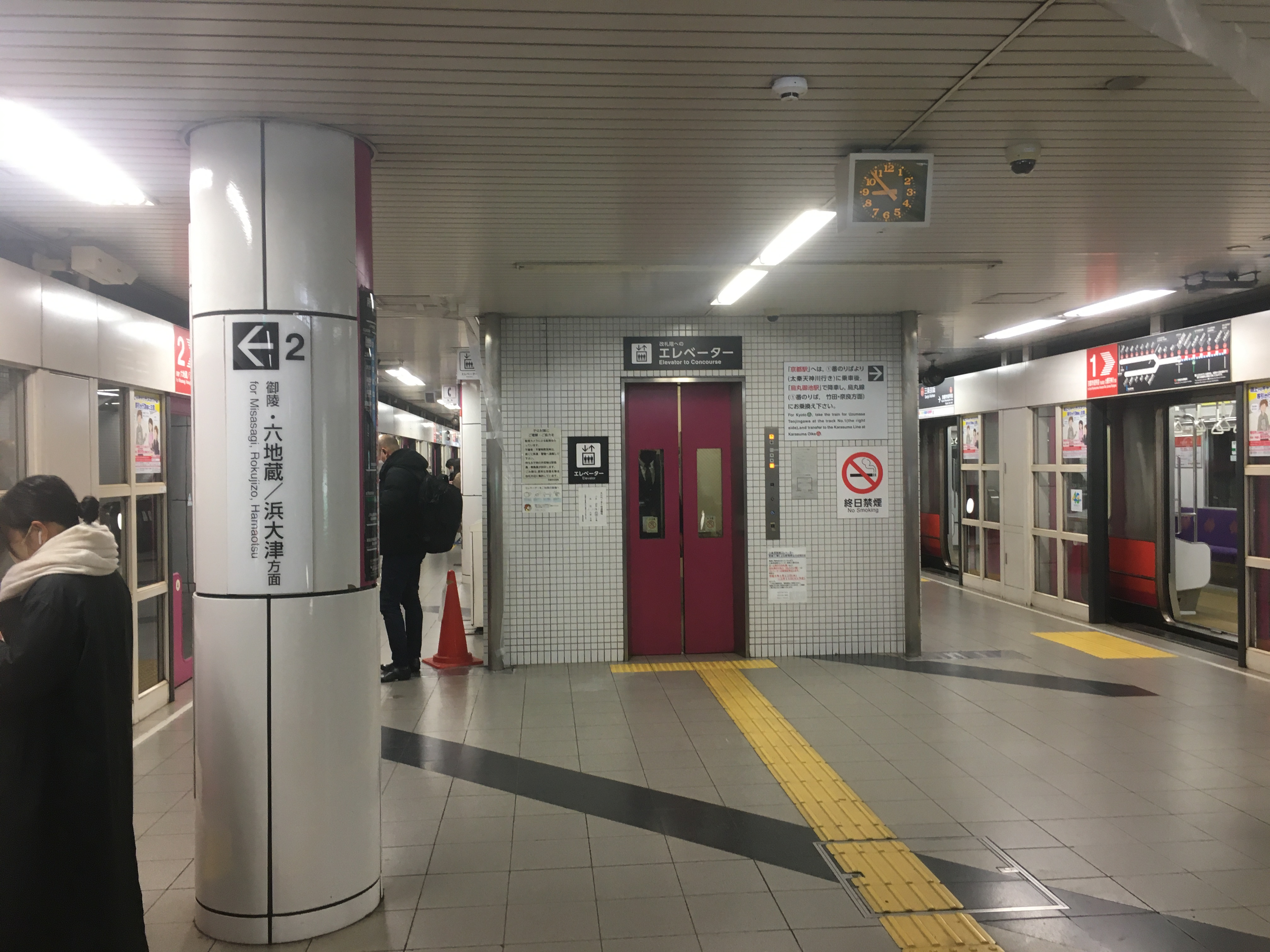
Platform
