= Kawaramachi Avenue =

Street in Kyoto city, Japan

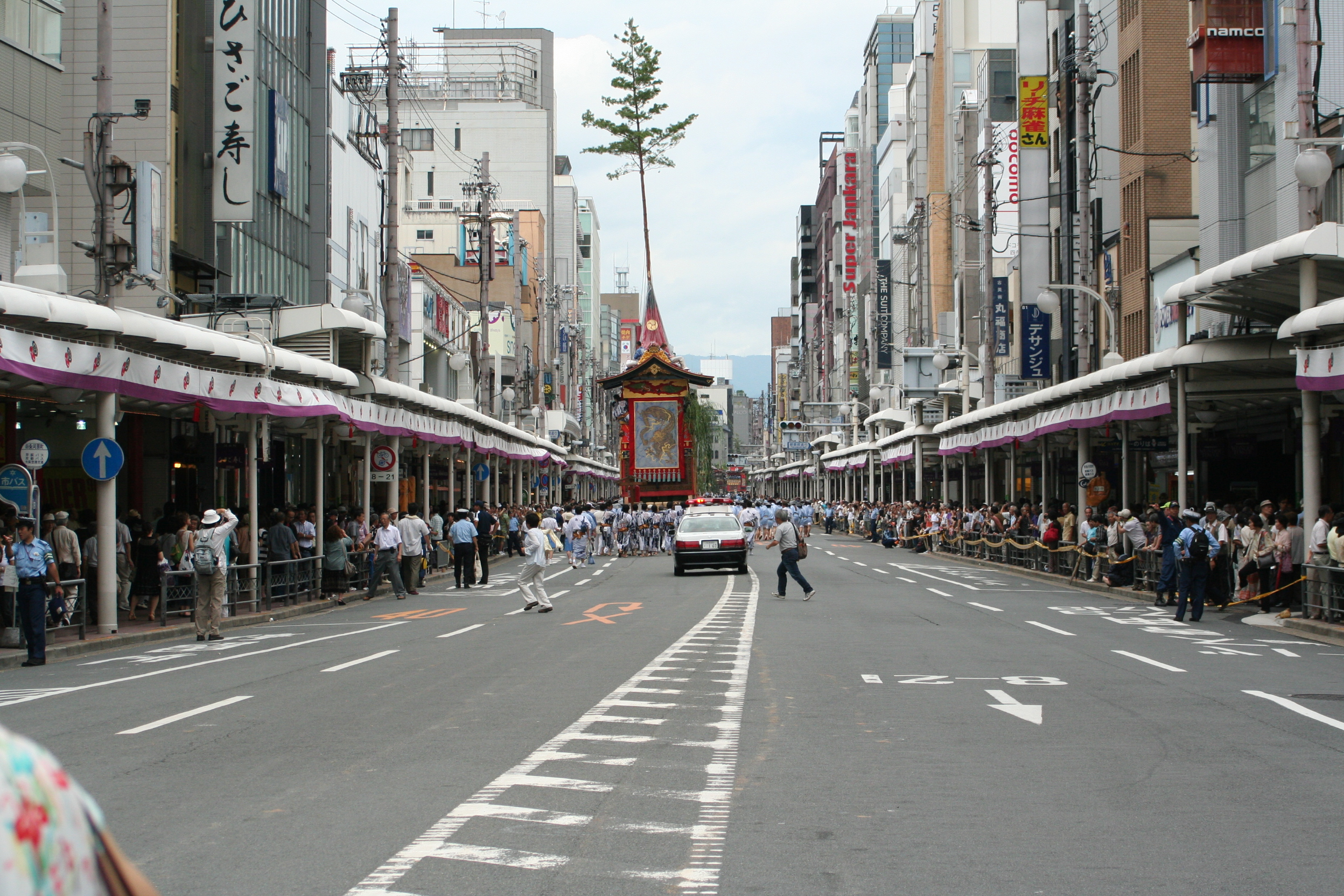
The Yamaboko Junkō parade on Kawaramachi Street during the Gion Matsuri festival on July 17, 2009

Kawaramachi Avenue (河原町通, Kawaramachi-dōri) runs parallel to the west bank of the Kamo River on the eastern side of Kyoto, Japan. Its intersection with Shijō Street is called Shijō Kawaramachi and is a leading shopping district of the city.

Both Shijō and Kawaramachi Street are protected with smoking bans.

== Overview ==
=== Edo Period ===
Located outside of Heian-kyō and runs almost parallel to Toyotomi Hideyoshi's Odoi. It is thought that it was established when the city expanded to the Kamo River in the early Edo Period.

From north to south it extends from Aoibashi Nishizume to Jujō Street. North of Aoibashi Nishizume its name changes to Shimogamo Main Street. South of Jujō Street it curves along the Kamo River and joins with Kuzebashi Street. The stretch between Sanjō Street and Shijō Street is one of Kyoto's downtown shopping streets.

Because the portion between Shijō Street and Kamijuzuyacho Street runs parallel to the Kamo River bending in a North-North-East and South-South-West direction it naturally intersects with north–south running Teramachi Street and Gokomachi Street.

== History ==
It is not clear when the excavation began of the eastern end of Heikan-kyo and inner eastern side of Odoi but because Odoi was runs along Kawaramachi Street's western side it is thought to be after the creation of Kawaramachi.

As of 2021, utility poles which had cluttered the street had been removed, restoring the historical feel of Kawaramachi-dōri.

== Points of Interest ==
- Kitamura Museum
- Kyoto Prefectural Centre for Arts and Culture
- Honzen-ji
- Shōjōkeiin
- Rozan-ji
- Kyoto Prefectural University of Medicine
- Bank of Japan Kyoto Branch
- Kyoto City Office
- Zesuto-Oike (Underground shopping street)
- Kyoto Hotel Okura
- Kyoto Shiyakusho-mae Station of Kyoto Municipal Subway Tōzai Line
- Honnō-ji
- St. Francis Xavier Cathedral, Kyoto
- Mina Kyoto
- Takashimaya Kyoto Branch
- KYOTO MARUI
- Kyoto-kawaramachi Station of Hankyu Kyoto Main Line
- Hito-machi Cultural Exchange Centre
- Shōsei-en Garden
