= Ōtani Station (Shiga) =

Railway station in Ōtsu, Shiga Prefecture, Japan

Ōtani Station 大谷駅
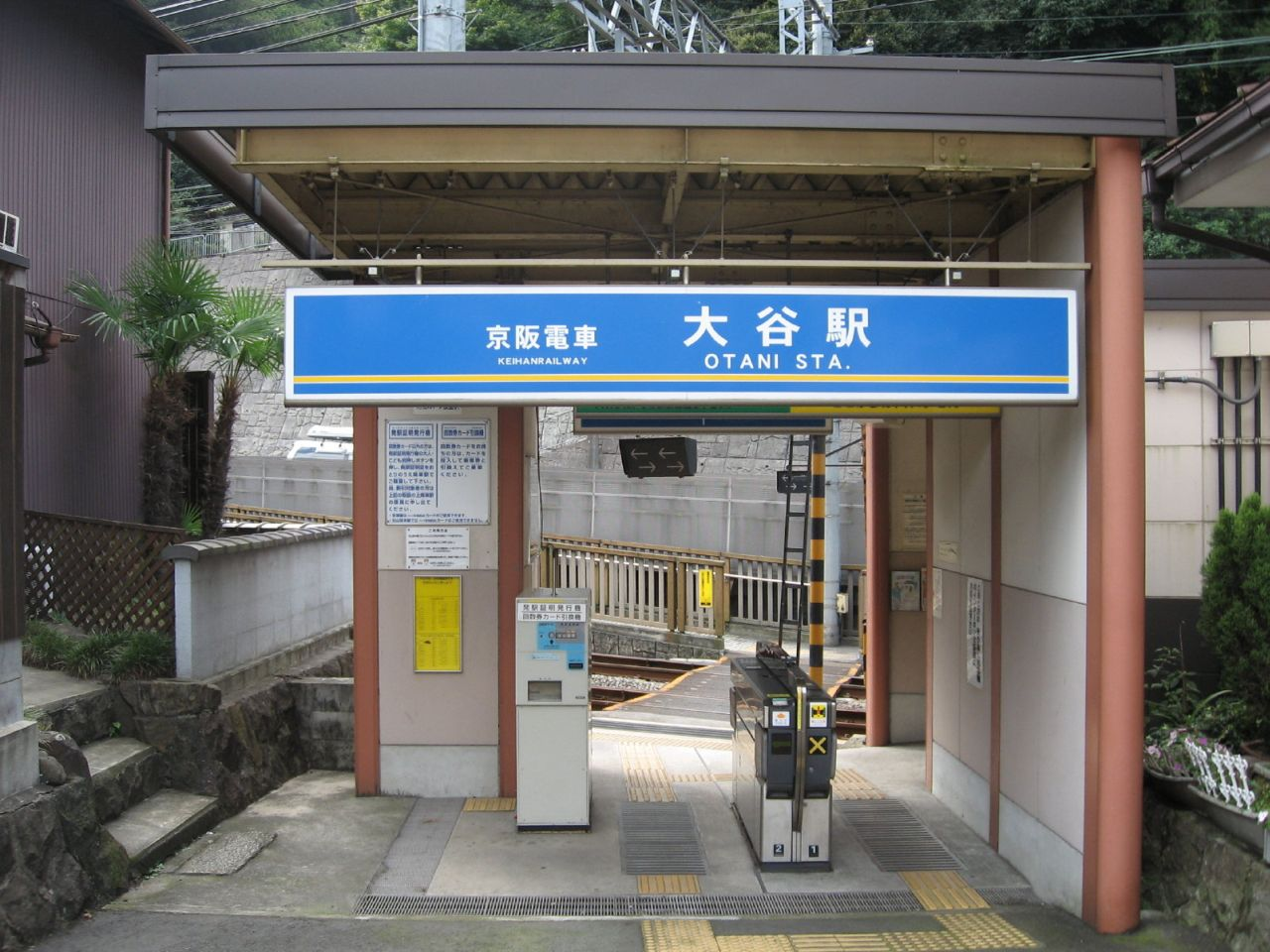
- Ōtani Station

General information
- Location: 23 Ōtanichō, Ōtsu-shi, Shiga-ken 520-0062; Japan
- Coordinates: 34°59′38.86″N 135°51′13.29″E
- Operator: Keihan Electric Railway
- Line: Keishin Line
- Distance: 5.0 km from Misasagi
- Platforms: 2 side platforms

Other information
- Station code: OT34
- Website: Official website

History
- Opened: August 15, 1912

Passengers
- FY2019: 189 daily

Services
Preceding station	Keihan Electric Railway	Following station
Oiwake OT33 towards Misasagi	Keishin Line	Kamisakaemachi OT35 towards Biwako-hamaotsu
Location
- Location within Shiga Prefecture Location within Japan

Ōtani Station (大谷駅, Ōtani-eki) is a passenger railway station located in the city of Ōtsu, Shiga Prefecture, Japan, operated by the private railway company Keihan Electric Railway.

== Lines ==
Ōtani Station is served by the Keihan Keishin Line, and is 5.0 kilometers from the starting point of the line at Misasagi.

== Station layout ==
The station consists of two opposed unnumbered side platforms connected by a level crossing. The station is unattended.

== Platforms ==
exit side	■ Keishin Line	for Hamaōtsu; Change to the Ishiyama-Sakamoto Line for Ishiyamadera and Sakamoto
opposite side	■ Keishin Line	for Misasagi, Kyōto Shiyakusho-mae, and Uzumasa Tenjingawa; Change to the Keihan Line at Sanjo-Keihan for (Demachiyanagi and Osaka (Yodoyabashi, Nakanoshima))

== History ==
Ōtani Station was opened on August 18, 1879 as a station on the Japanese Government Railways (JGR) Tōkaidō Main Line. The Keitsu Electric Railway (the predecessor to the Keihan Electric Railway) connected to the station on August 15, 1912. Due to a change in the routing of the tracks the JGR portion of the station was discontinued in 1921.

=== Past line ===
«	Service	»
Japanese Government Railway Tōkaidō Line (Old route)
Baba (present: Zeze)	-	Yamashina

== Passenger statistics ==
In fiscal 2018, the station was used by an average of 189 passengers daily (boarding passengers only).

== Surrounding area ==
- Semimaru Shrine
- Japan National Route 1

== See also ==
- List of railway stations in Japan
