= Higashiyama Station (Kyoto) =

Metro station in Kyoto, Japan

T10 Higashiyama Station 東山駅
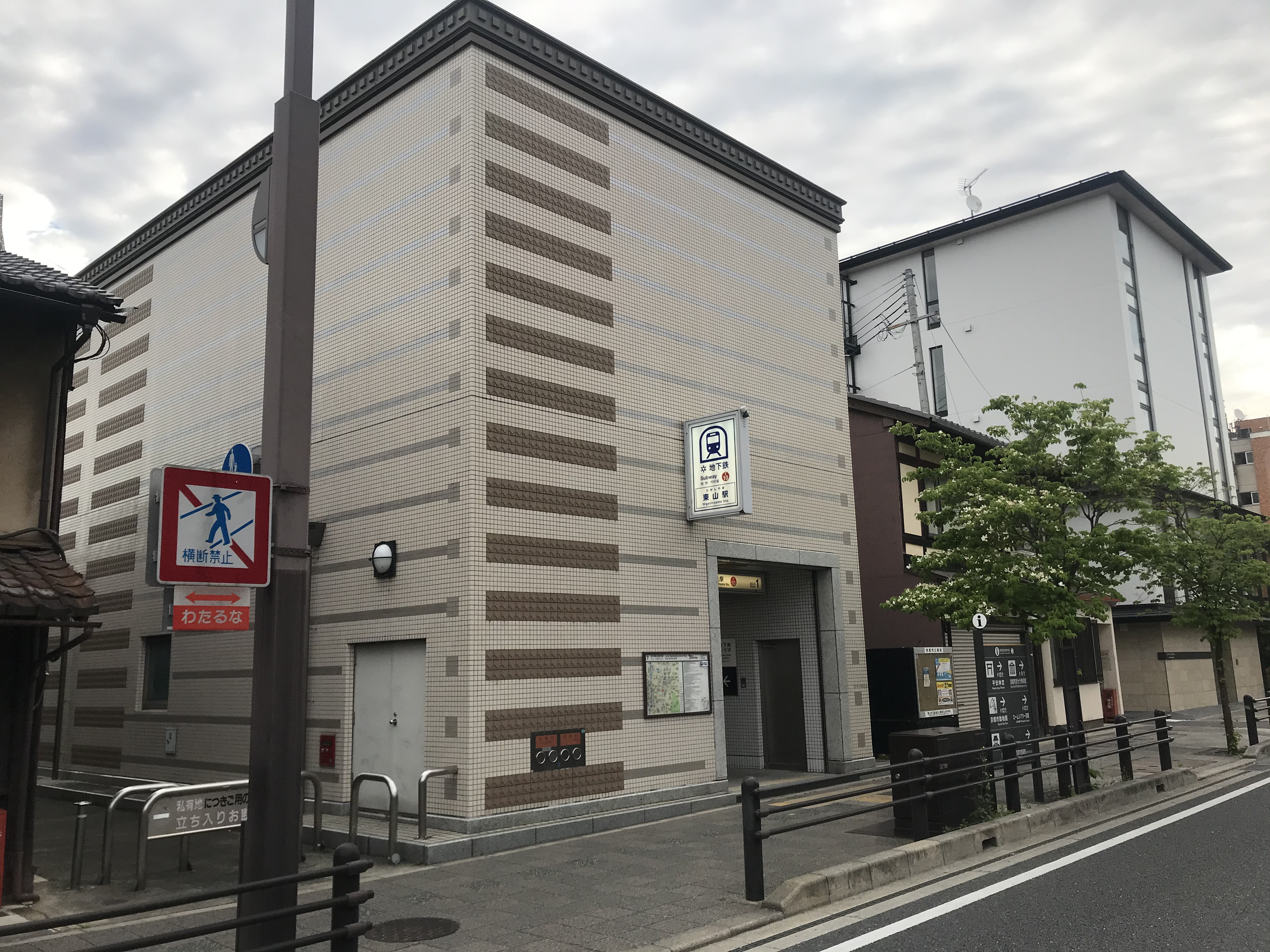
- Entrance No.1 in 2020

General information
- Location: Ōidechō, Higashiyama, Kyoto, Kyoto （京都市東山区大井手町） Japan
- Coordinates: 35°0′34″N 135°46′47″E
- Operator: Kyoto Municipal Transportation Bureau
- Line: Tōzai Line
- Platforms: 1 island platform
- Tracks: 2
- Connections

Construction
- Structure type: Underground

Other information
- Station code: T10

History
- Opened: 1997; 29 years ago

Passengers
- FY2016: 19,731 daily

Services
| Preceding station | Kyoto Municipal Subway | Following station |
|---|---|---|
| Sanjō Keihan T11 towards Uzumasa Tenjingawa | Tōzai Line | Keage T09 towards Rokujizō |
Location

Higashiyama Station (東山駅, Higashiyama-eki; station Number: T10) is a train station on the Kyoto City Subway Tozai Line in Higashiyama-ku, Kyoto City, Kyoto Prefecture, Japan.

== Layout ==
The subway station has an island platform serving two tracks separated by platform screen doors.

| 1 | ■ Tōzai Line | for Kyōto Shiyakusho-mae, Karasuma Oike and Uzumasa Tenjingawa |
| 2 | ■ Tōzai Line | for Yamashina, Rokujizō and (Keihan Railway Keishin Line) Biwako-hamaotsu |

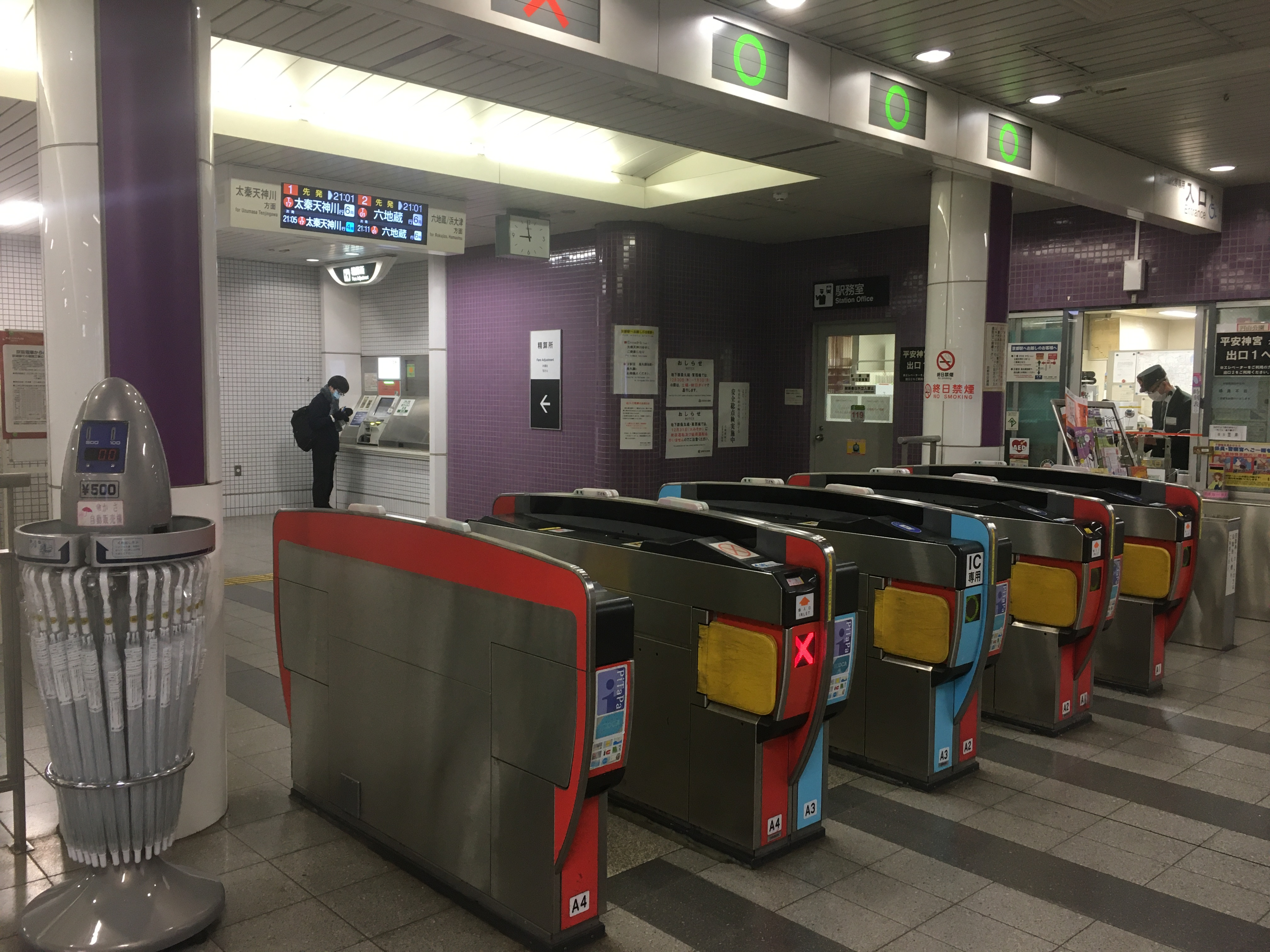
Ticket gates

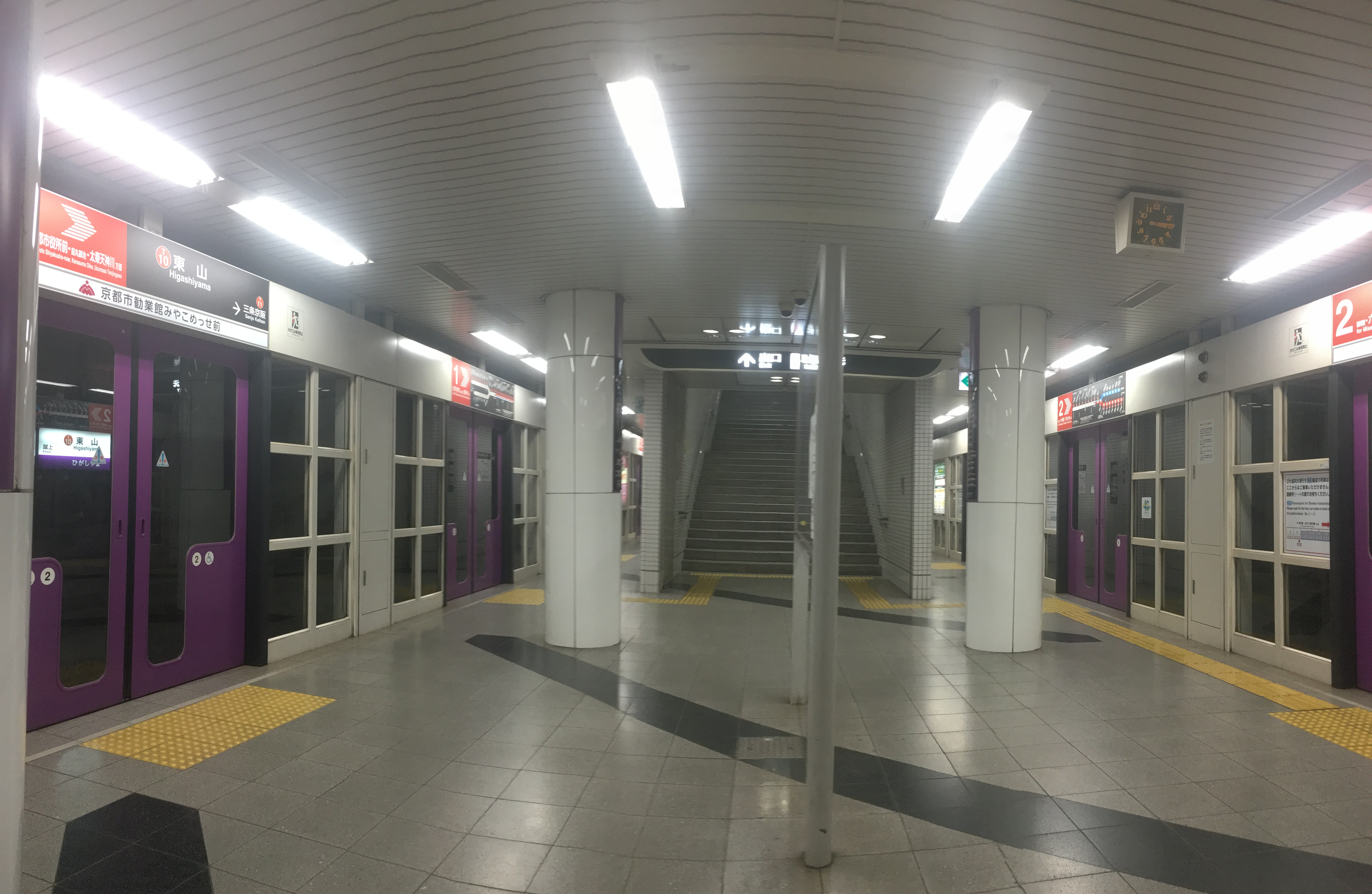
Platform

== Surroundings ==
North of Sanjo-dori Street

- Heian Shrine
- Okazaki Park
  - The National Museum of Modern Art, Kyoto
  - Kyoto Municipal Museum of Art
  - Kyoto Prefectural Library
- ROHM Theatre Kyoto
- Kyoto International Exhibition Hall (Miyako Messe)
- Hosomi Museum

South of Sanjo-dori Street

- Shōren-in
- Chion-in
- Maruyama Park
- Yasaka Shrine
- Gion
- Kōdai-ji
