= Kamisakaemachi Station =

Railway station in Ōtsu, Shiga Prefecture, Japan

Kamisakaemachi Station 上栄町駅
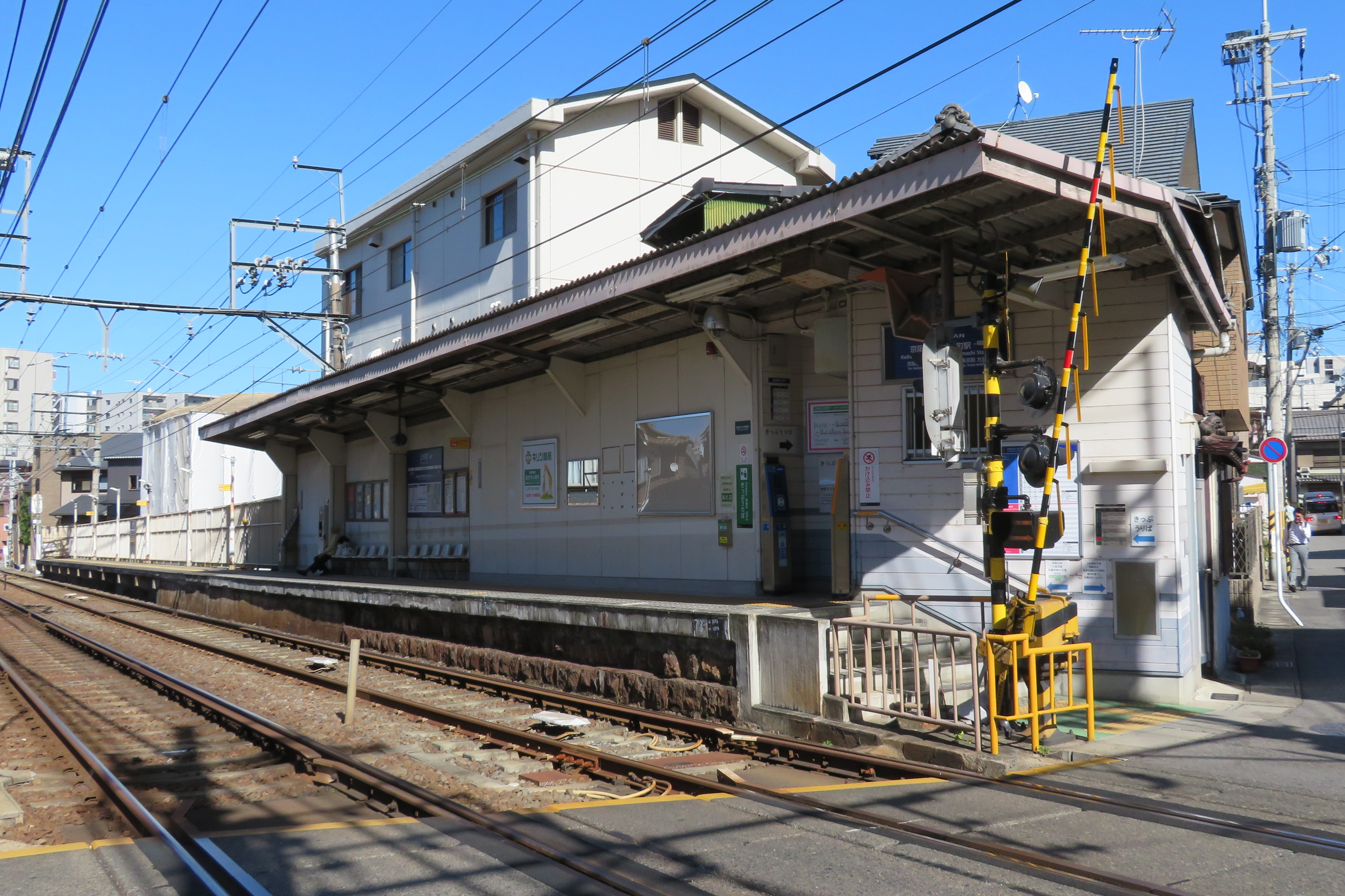
- Kamisakaemachi Station, September 2019

General information
- Location: 1-7 Fudanotsuji-chō, Ōtsu-shi, Shiga-ken 520-0054; Japan
- Coordinates: 35.0052°N 135.8601°E
- Operator: Keihan Electric Railway
- Line: Keishin Line
- Distance: 6.7 km from Misasagi
- Platforms: 2 side platforms

Other information
- Station code: OT35
- Website: Official website

History
- Opened: August 15, 1912
- Closed: 1943-1946
- Former names: Nagarakoen-shita (until 1946)

Passengers
- FY2019: 715 daily

Services
Preceding station	Keihan Electric Railway	Following station
Ōtani OT34 towards Misasagi	Keishin Line	Biwako-hamaotsu OT12 Terminus
Location
- Location within Shiga Prefecture Location within Japan

Kamisakaemachi Station (上栄町駅, Kamisakaemachi-eki) is a passenger railway station located in the city of Ōtsu, Shiga Prefecture, Japan, operated by the private railway company Keihan Electric Railway.

== Lines ==
Kamisakaemachi Station is served by the Keihan Keishin Line, and is 6.7 kilometers from the starting point of the line at Misasagi.

== Station layout ==
The station consists of two opposed unnumbered side platforms connected by a level crossing. The station is unattended.

== Platforms ==
north	■ Keishin Line	for Biwako-Hamaōtsu, Ishiyamadera and Sakamoto-hieizanguchi
south	■ Keishin Line	for Yamashina

== History ==
Kamisakaemachi Station was opened on August 15, 1912 as Nagarakoen-shita Station (長等公園下駅, Nagarakoen-shita-eki). The station was closed on November 10, 1943 and reopened on January 1, 1946. It was renamed to its present name on March 1, 1956.

== Passenger statistics ==
In fiscal 2018, the station was used by an average of 715 passengers daily (boarding passengers only).

== Surrounding area ==
- Nagara Park
- Gonsho-ji Temple (Takakannon)
- Setsuko Mihashi Museum
- Otsu Red Cross Hospital

== See also ==
- List of railway stations in Japan
