= Shinomiya Station =

Railway station in Kyoto, Japan

Coordinates: 34.9918°N 135.8240°E

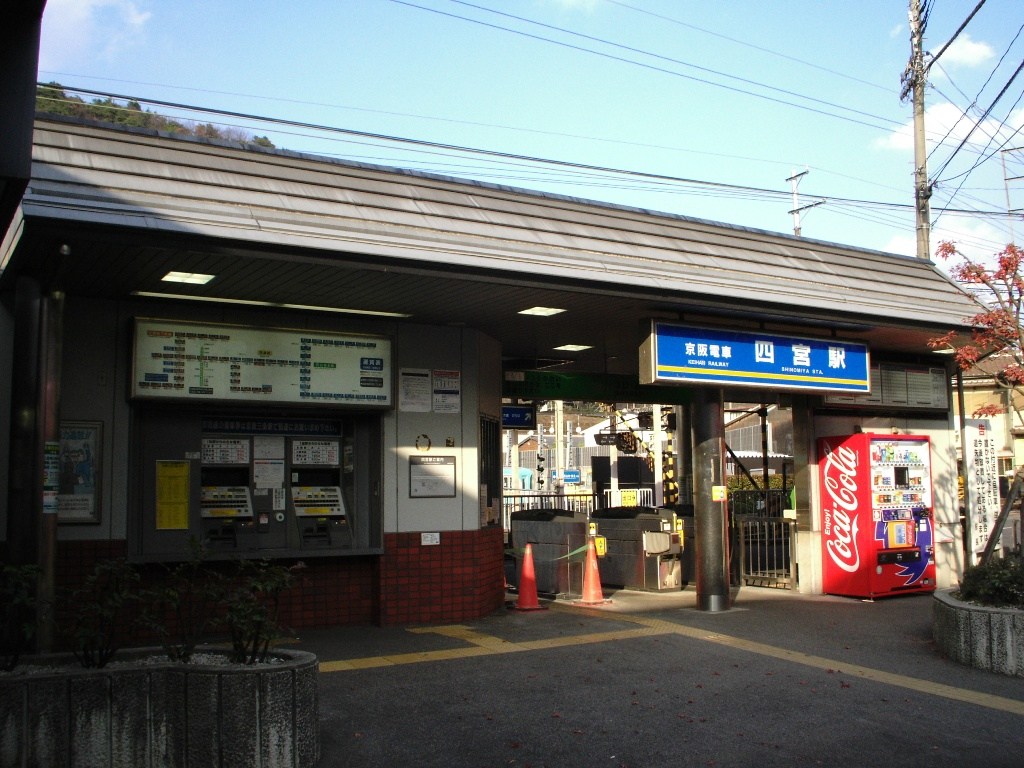
Station building

Shinomiya Station (四宮駅, Shinomiya-eki) is a train station in Yamashina-ku, Kyoto, Japan.

== Lines ==
- Keihan Electric Railway
  - Keishin Line

== Adjacent stations ==
| Preceding station | Keihan Electric Railway | Following station |
|---|---|---|
| Keihan-yamashina towards Misasagi | Keishin Line | Oiwake towards Biwako-hamaotsu |
