= Keihan 800 series =

Electric multiple unit train type operated in Japan since 1997

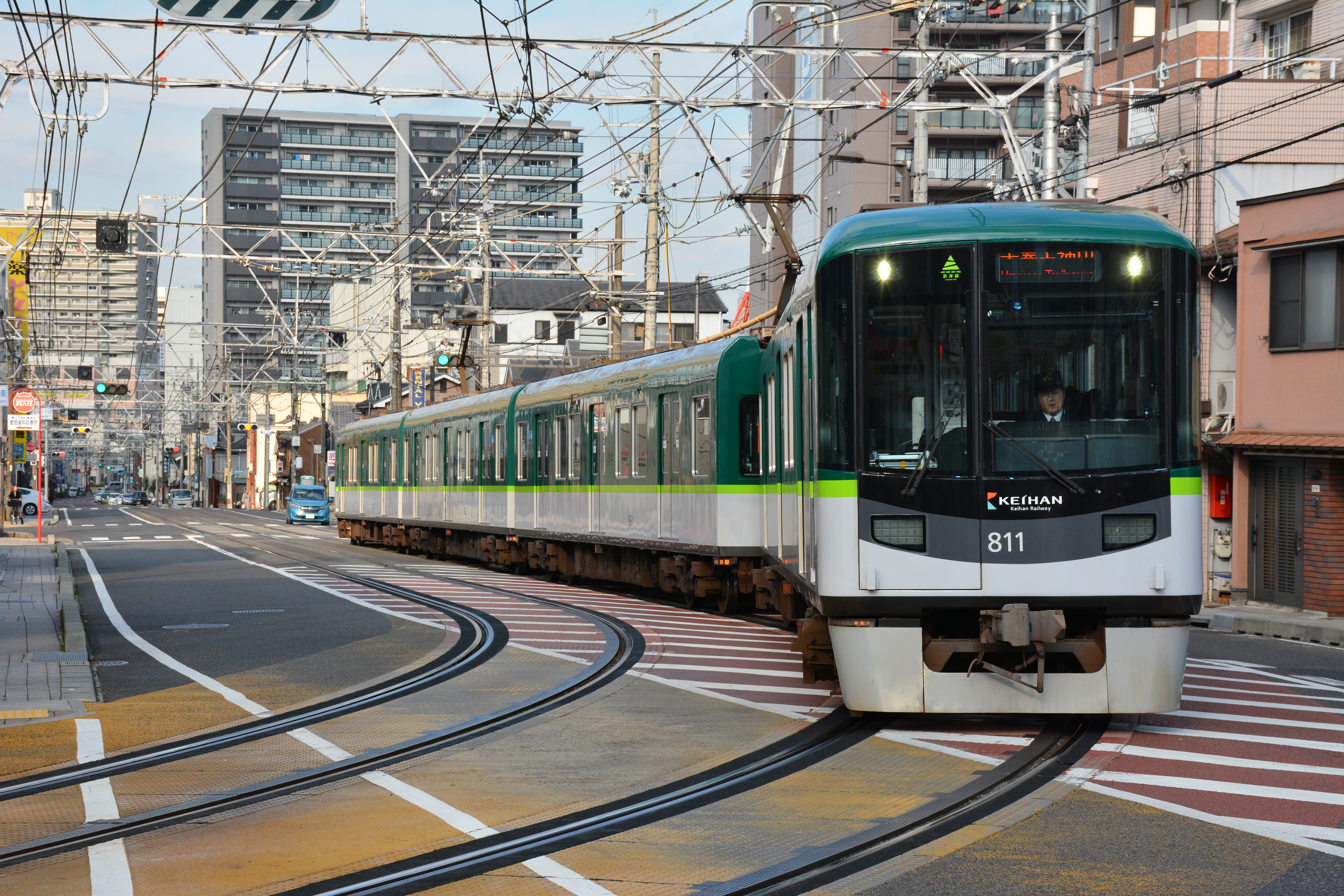
- An 800 series set in revised livery in November 2019
- Manufacturer: Kawasaki Heavy Industries
- Built at: Kobe
- Constructed: 1997
- Entered service: 12 October 1997
- Number built: 32 vehicles (8 sets)
- Number in service: 32 vehicles (8 sets)
- Formation: 4 cars per trainset
- Fleet numbers: 801–815
- Operator: Keihan Electric Railway
- Lines served: Keihan Keishin Line; Kyoto Municipal Subway Tōzai Line

Specifications
- Car body construction: Steel
- Car length: 16,500 mm (54 ft 2 in)
- Width: 2,440 mm (8 ft 0 in)
- Height: 3,475 mm (11 ft 5 in)
- Doors: 3 pairs per side
- Maximum speed: 75 km/h (47 mph)
- Traction system: Variable frequency (IGBT)
- Electric system: 1,500 V DC
- Current collection: Overhead wire
- Bogies: FS558
- Safety systems: Keihan ATS, CS-ATC, ATO
- Track gauge: 1,435 mm (4 ft 8 1/2 in)

The Keihan 800 series (京阪800系, Keihan 800-kei) is a class of electric multiple unit (EMU) commuter trains operated since 1997 by the privately owned Keihan Electric Railway on its Keihan Keishin Line and the Kyoto Municipal Subway Tozai Line in Japan.

== Interior ==
Passenger accommodation consists of longitudinal bench seating in the intermediate cars and transverse seating in the end cars.

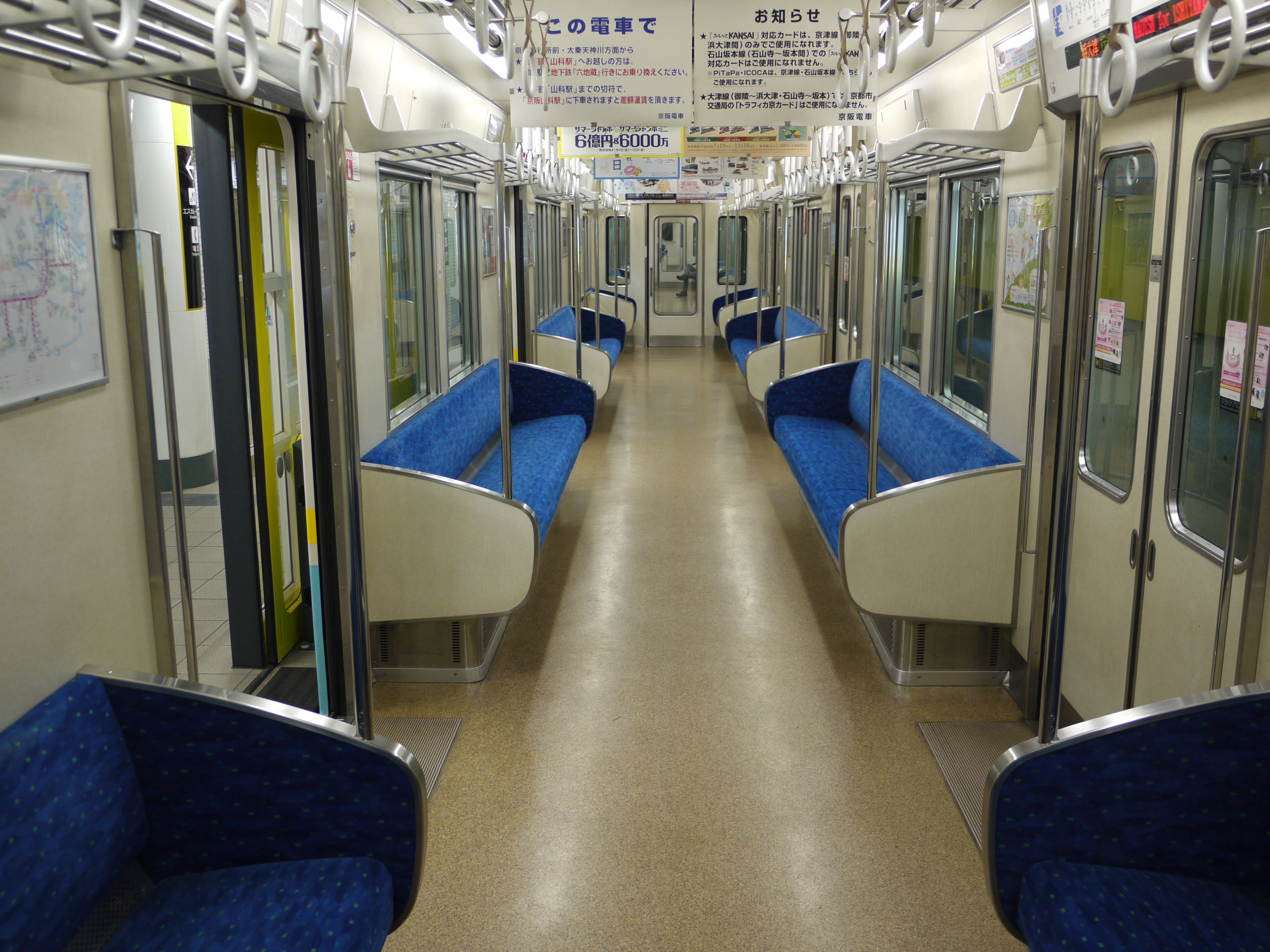
The interior of intermediate car 865 with longitudinal seating in July 2014

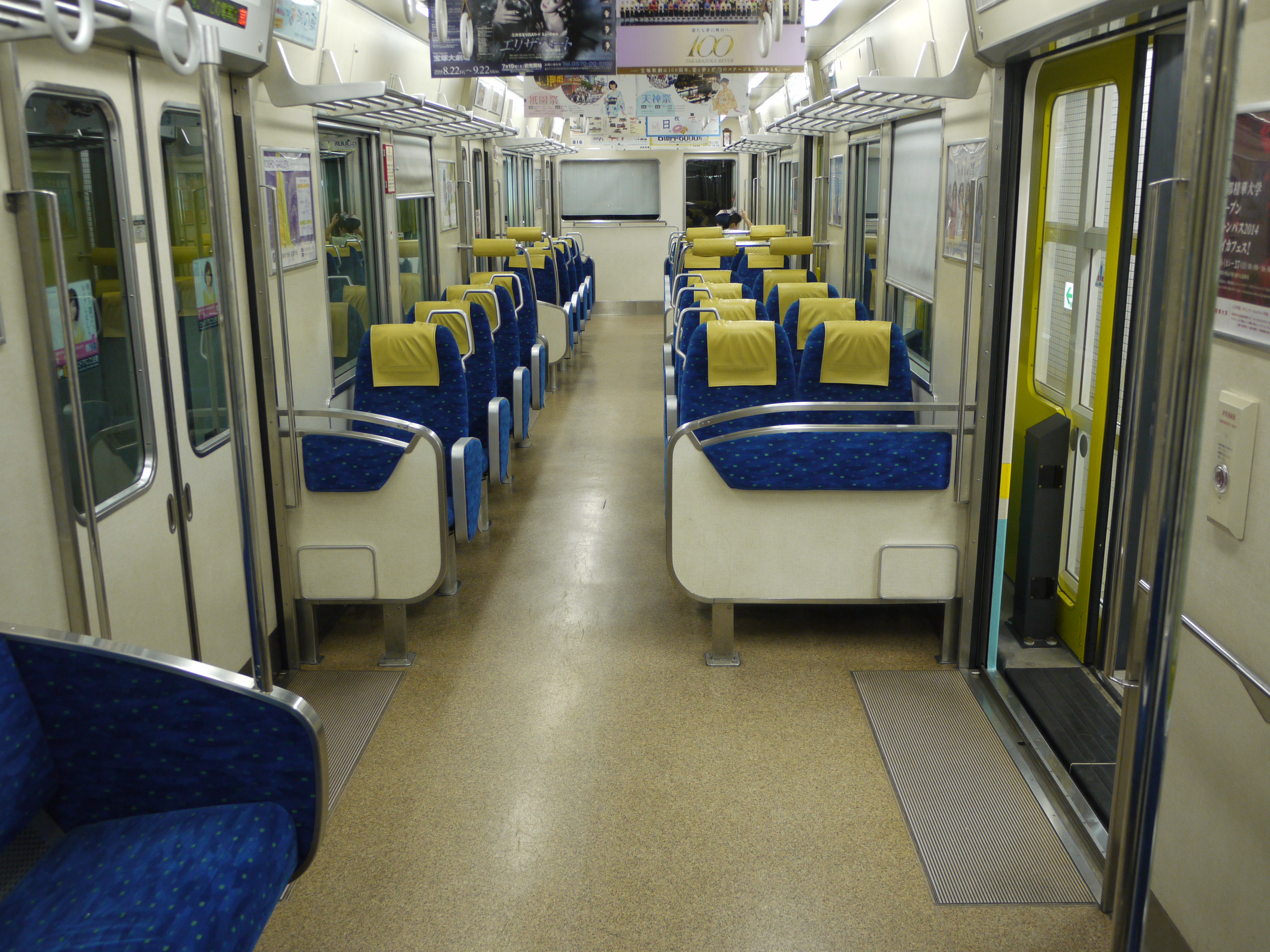
The interior of end car 815 with transverse seating in July 2014

== Formations ==
As of 1 April 2016, the fleet consisted of eight four-car sets (801 to 815), formed with car 1 at the Hamaōtsu end. All cars are motored.

Car No.	1	2	3	4
Designation	Mc1	M1	M2	Mc2
Numbering	8xx	85x	85x	8xx
Weight (t)	28.0	28.0	28.0	28.0
Capacity (seated/total)	30/88	42/105	42/105	30/88

The M1 and M2 cars each have one single-arm pantograph.

== History ==
The first trains entered service in 1997.

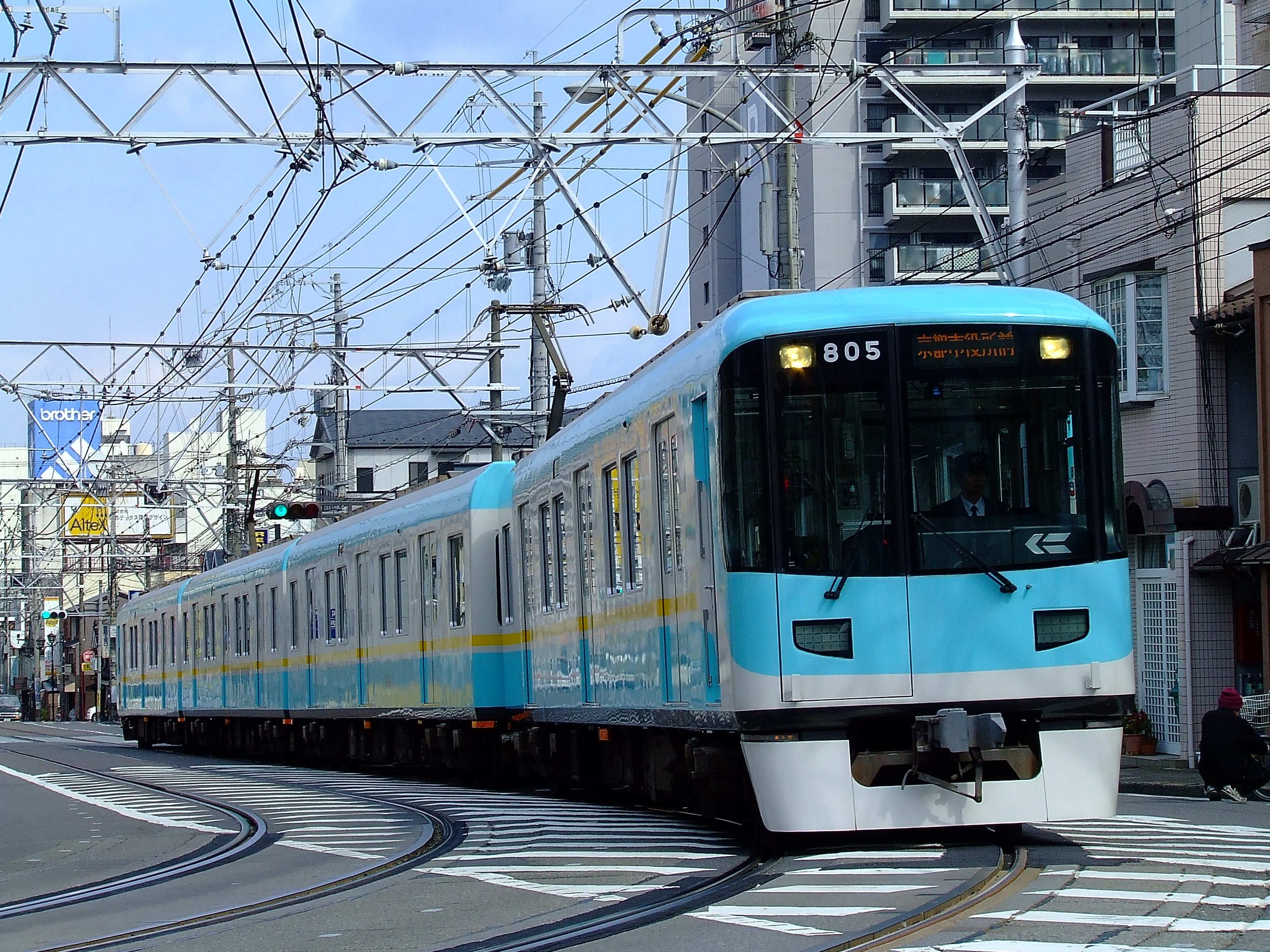
Set 805 in original livery in March 2007

== Future developments ==
Between 2017 and March 2021, the entire fleet of 800 series trains is scheduled to be repainted in the standard corporate Keihan Electric Railway livery of "rest green" on the upper body and "atmos white" on the lower body separated by a "fresh green" stripe.
