= Keihan Keishin Line =

Railway line in Kyoto, Japan

Keishin Line

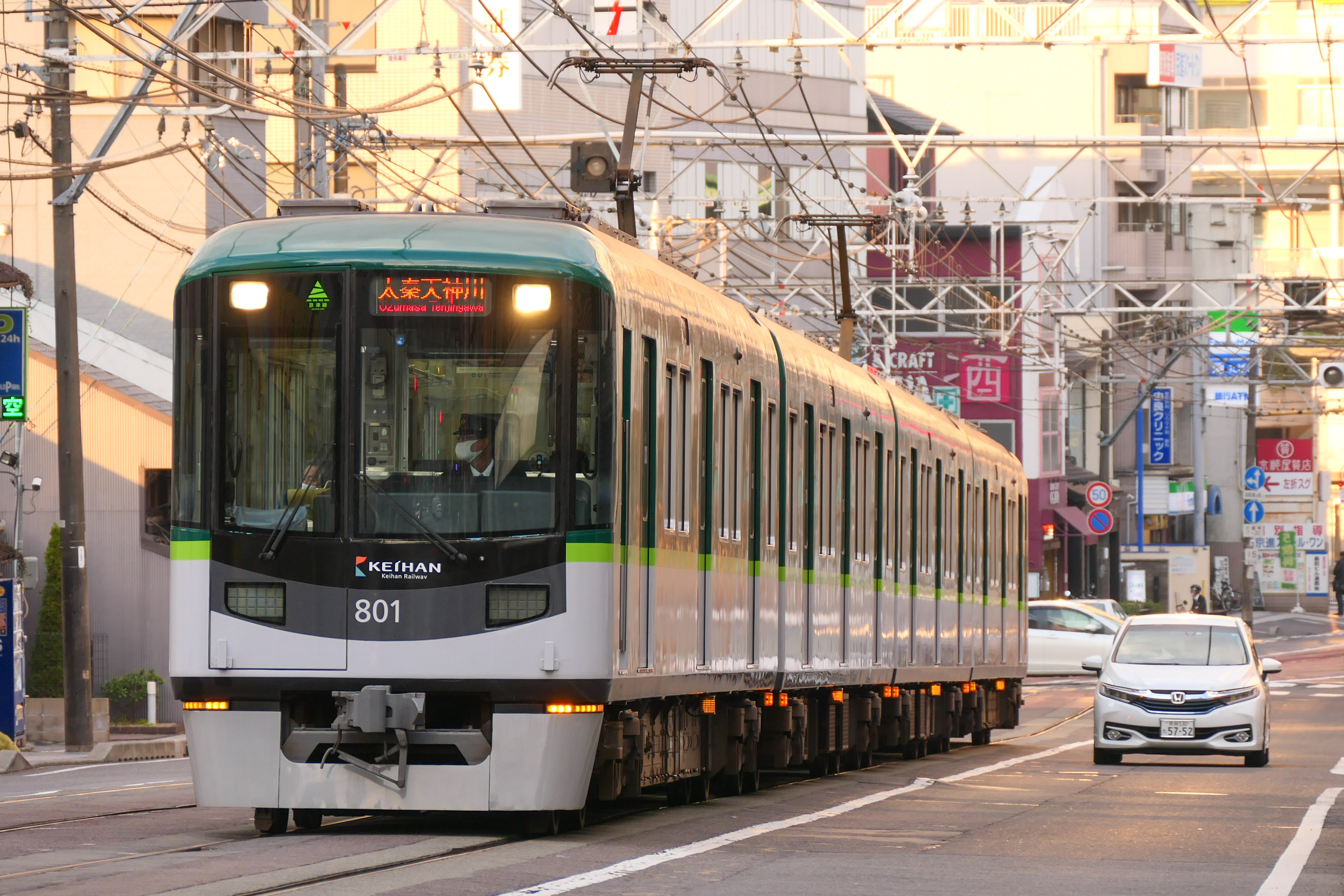
- A Keihan 800 series train on the street-running section

Overview
- Native name: 京津線
- Locale: Kyoto and Ōtsu, Japan
- Termini: Misasagi; Biwako-hamaotsu
- Stations: 7

Service
- Type: Interurban
- Operator(s): Keihan Electric Railway

History
- Opened: 1912
- Closed: 1997 (Misasagi - Keishin-Sanjo)

Technical
- Line length: 7.5 km (4.7 mi)
- Number of tracks: 2
- Track gauge: 1,435 mm (4 ft 8 1/2 in)
- Electrification: 1,500 V DC overhead catenary
Route map

The Keishin Line (京津線, Keishin-sen) is an interurban partially-street running railway line in Japan operated by the private railway operator Keihan Electric Railway. The 7.5 km (4.7 mi) line connects Misasagi Station in Kyoto and Biwako-hamaotsu Station in the neighbouring city of Ōtsu.

== Train service ==
Except trains between Shinomiya Station and Biwako-hamaotsu Station in early morning and late night, all trains go directly from Biwako-hamaotsu Station to Kyoto Shiyakusho-mae Station or Uzumasa Tenjingawa Station on the Kyoto City Subway Tōzai Line. During off peak hours, the line operates every 20 minutes.

== Stations and connecting lines ==
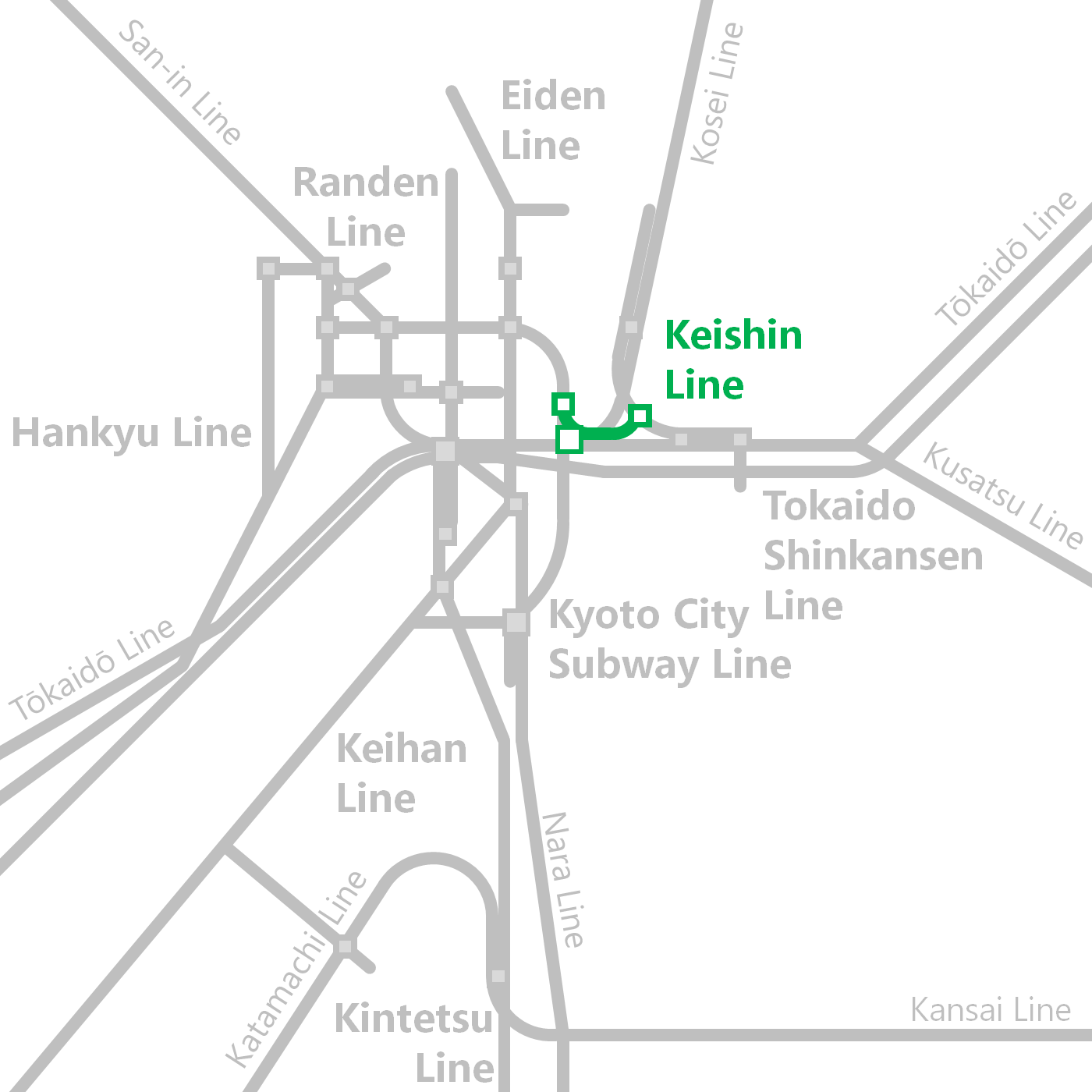
Railway map around Keishin Line

No.	Station	Japanese			Location
No.	Station		Distance (km)		Location
No.	Station			Transfers	Location
Operations continue to Uzumasa Tenjingawa Station on the Kyoto City Subway Tōzai Line.
T08	Misasagi	御陵	0.0	Kyoto City Subway Tozai Line (through trains)	Yamashina-ku, Kyoto
OT31	Keihan-yamashina	京阪 山科	1.5	JR West (Yamashina Station); A Tōkaidō Line (Biwako Line); B Kosei Line; Kyoto City Subway Tozai Line (T07: Yamashina Station)	Yamashina-ku, Kyoto
OT32	Shinomiya	四宮	2.1		Yamashina-ku, Kyoto
OT33	Oiwake	追分	3.4		Ōtsu, Shiga
OT34	Otani	大谷	5.0		Ōtsu, Shiga
OT35	Kamisakaemachi	上栄町	6.7		Ōtsu, Shiga
OT12	Biwako-hamaotsu	びわ湖浜大津	7.5	Keihan Railway Ishiyama Sakamoto Line	Ōtsu, Shiga

Abandoned stations

- Midorigaoka Undōjō-mae: Shinomiya - Oiwake (extra station, abandoned in 1942)
- Kamisekidera: Ōtani - Kamisakaemachi (abandoned on August 15, 1971)
- Fudanotsuji: Kamisakaemachi - Biwako-Hamaōtsu (abandoned on October 1, 1946)

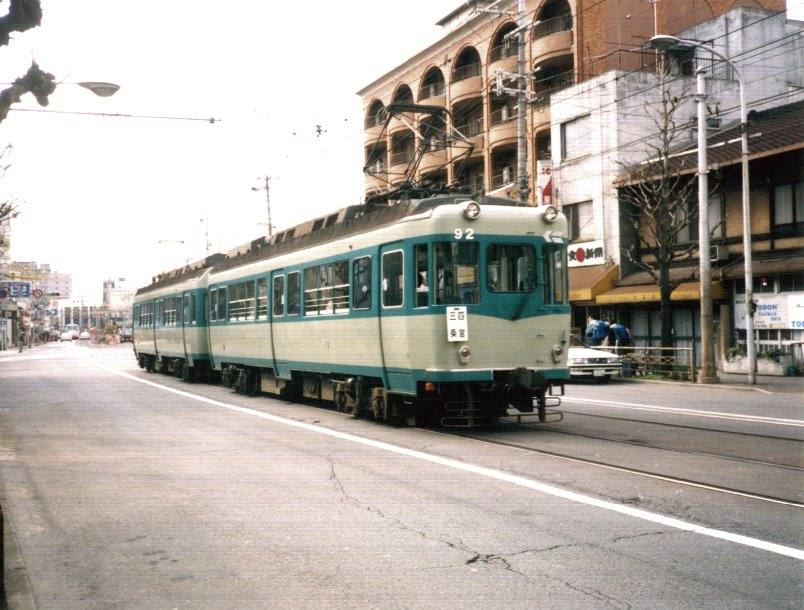
Keihan 80 Series interurban train operating on the streetrunning section in Kyoto before diversion into the Tozai Subway Line.

=== Abandoned section ===
The station list is as of 1997 before the street running section was abandoned due to replacement by the Tōzai Line subway. It also lists the corresponding subway stations that replaced the Keishin Line stations.

Station	Connection / note	Replaced by	Location
Keishin-Sanjō	Keihan Main Line, Keihan Ōtō Line	Sanjō-Keihan	Higashiyama-ku, Kyoto
Higashiyama-Sanjō		Higashiyama	Higashiyama-ku, Kyoto
~~Heianjingū-mae~~	Abandoned in 1944		Higashiyama-ku, Kyoto
~~Okazakimichi~~	Abandoned in 1931		Higashiyama-ku, Kyoto
Keage		Keage	Higashiyama-ku, Kyoto
Kujōyama			Yamashina-ku, Kyoto
Hinooka		Misasagi	Yamashina-ku, Kyoto
Misasagi		Misasagi	Yamashina-ku, Kyoto

== Rolling stock ==
- Keihan 800 series, four-car EMUs

== History ==
The line was built in 1912 (dual track electrified at 600 V DC) to connect the city centers of Kyoto and Ōtsu by electric streetcars, as the steam-powered Tōkaidō Main Line was an indirect route between the two cities before its realignment in 1921.

The busiest section of the line, between Keishin-Sanjō Station and Misasagi Station, was replaced in 1997 by the Kyoto Subway Tōzai Line, and the voltage increased to 1,500 V DC in conjunction with this project in 1996. One of the aims of the realignment was to move the tracks underground in the Kyoto area, in order to remove the former alignment along public roads. The line retains its public road alignment in Ōtsu.
