= Honnō-ji =

Historic Nichiren Buddhist temple in Kyoto, Japan

Coordinates: 35°00′37″N 135°46′06″E

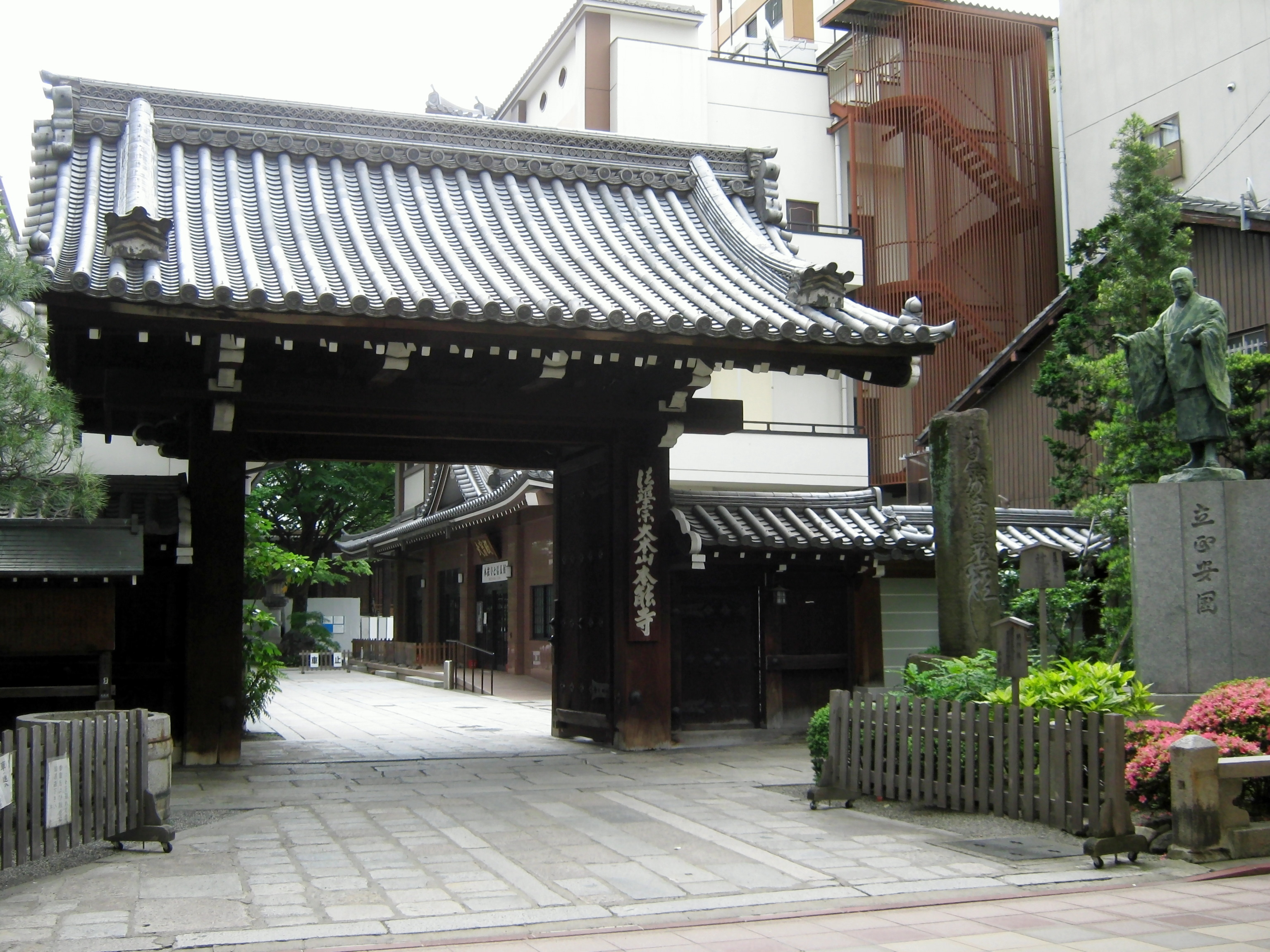
Honnō-ji main gate

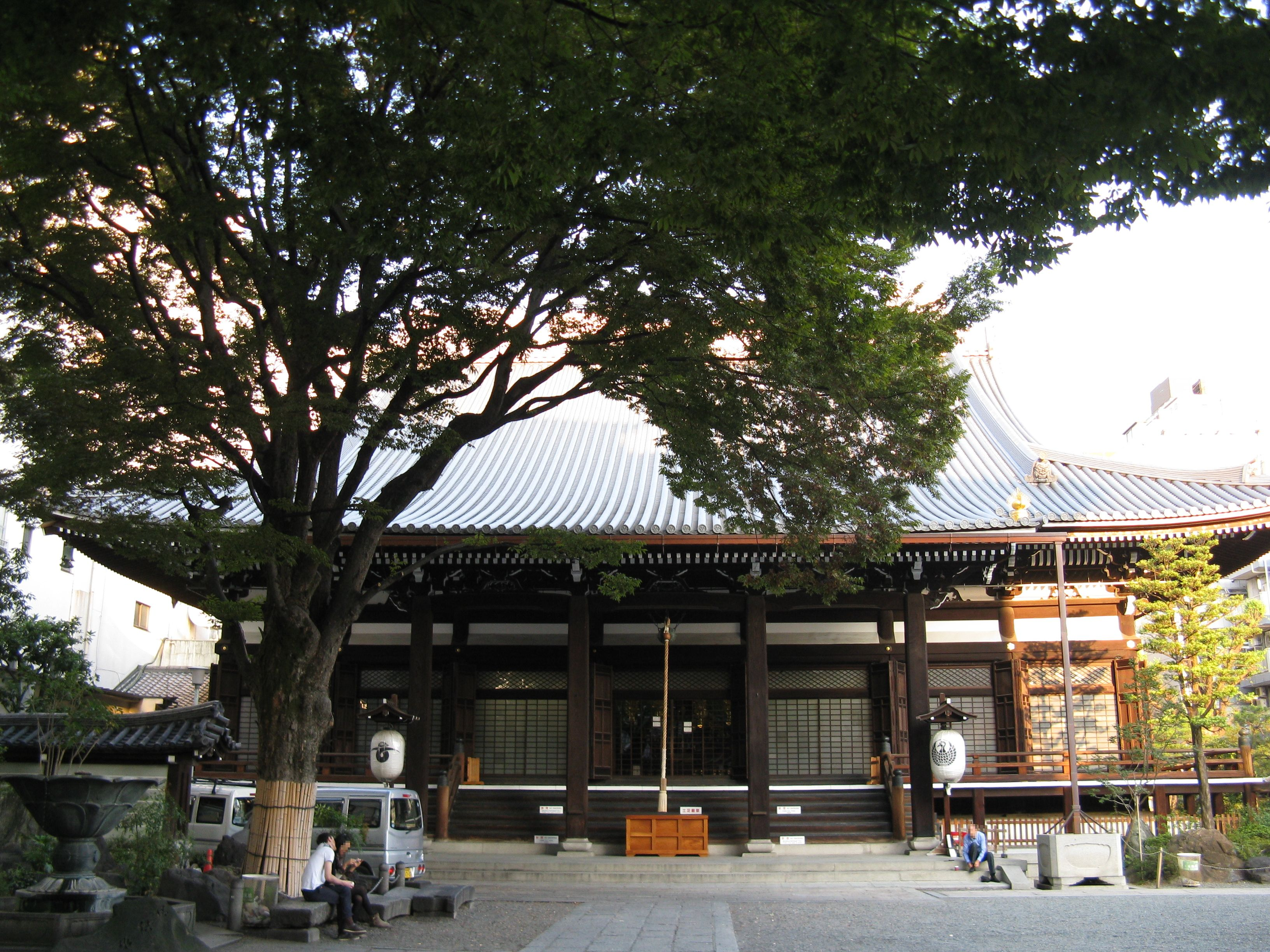
Honnō-ji main hall

Honnō-ji (本能寺) is a temple of the Nichiren branch of Buddhism located in Kyoto, Japan.

== Honnō-ji incident ==
Honnō-ji is most famous for the Honnō-ji incident, the assassination of the powerful warlord Oda Nobunaga, which occurred there on 21 June 1582. Nobunaga lodged at the temple with little protection before his invasion of the west, but was betrayed by his general Akechi Mitsuhide, who moved in superior forces by subterfuge, besieged the temple, and set it on fire. Knowing there was no way out for him, Nobunaga committed seppuku along with his attendant Mori Ranmaru.

In 1591, Nobunaga's successor Toyotomi Hideyoshi ordered the reconstruction of Honnō-ji, but on a different site due to the circumstances. Honnō-ji was rebuilt on its current location in present-day Nakagyō Ward, near Kyoto Shiyakusho-mae Station.

== See also ==
- Glossary of Japanese Buddhism
- Honnōji Hotel
- List of National Treasures of Japan (temples)
