= Shosei-en Garden =

Garden in Kyoto, Japan

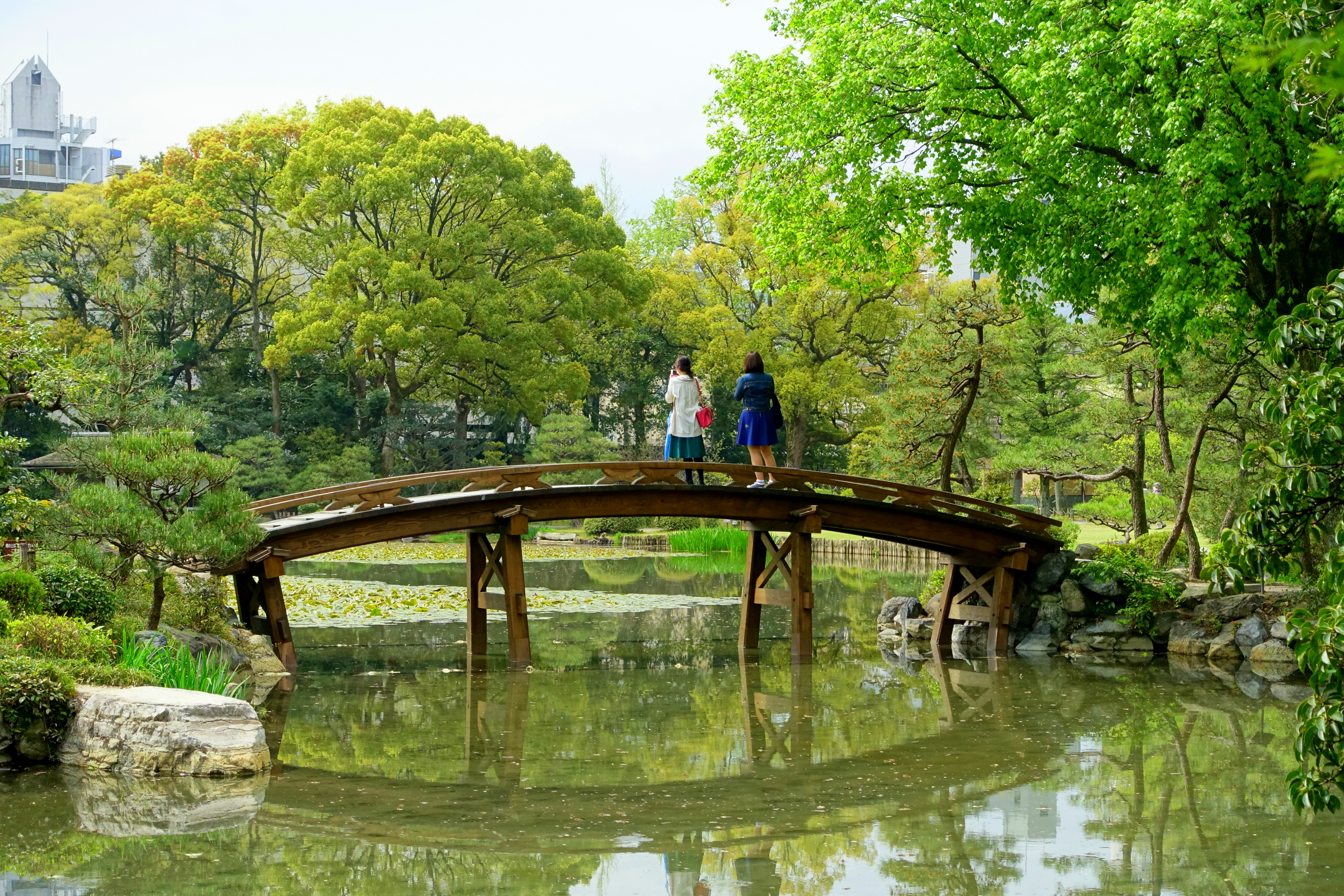
- Bridge in the garden, 2018
- Interactive map of Shosei-en Garden
- Type: Garden
- Location: Japan
- Nearest city: Kyoto
- Coordinates: 34°59′29″N 135°45′48″E

Shosei-en Garden (渉成園) is a garden in Kyoto, Japan. The garden has teahouses, a hall with a Buddhist altar, and two ponds. The garden was named by Sennyo Shōnin, who used the garden as a residence when he retired in 1653 and was gifted the land by the shōgun Tokugawa Iemitsu. Sennyo Shōnin named the garden after a line in the Chinese poem Let Me Return Home Again by Tao Yuanming.

The garden is about 35,000 square meters. It has a large central pond with walking paths around it. Historically, the garden served as a retirement spot for Buddhist abbots, and was also used for enjoying tea ceremony and poetry writing. The garden is now open to the general public. It is considered a Place of Scenic Beauty by the government of Japan.
