= Honzen-ji =

Buddhist temple in Kyoto, Japan

Coordinates: 35°1′35.89″N 135°46′5.83″E

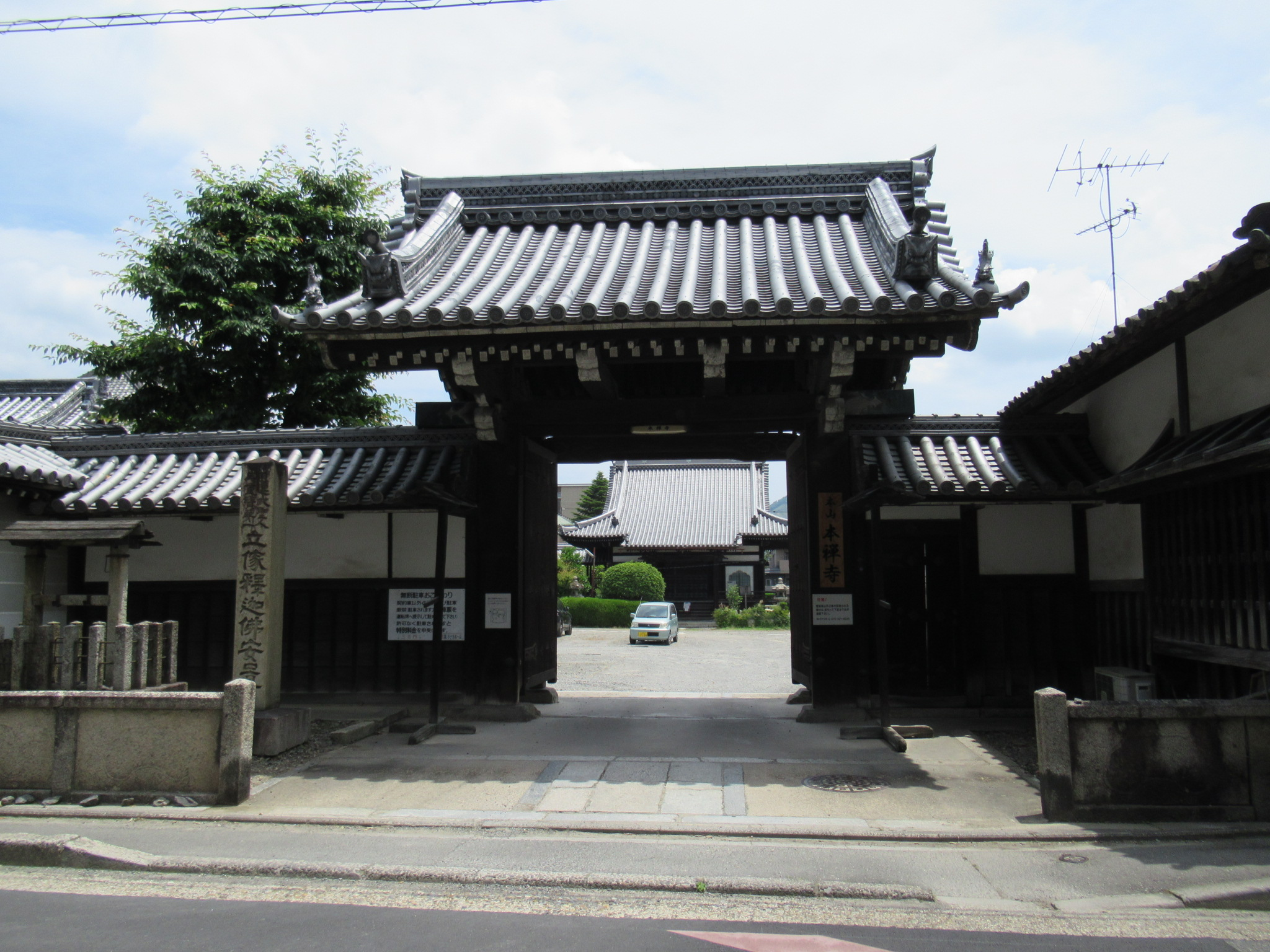
Honzenji mountain gate, 2019

Honzenji (本禅寺) is a Nichiren Buddhist temple in Kyoto, founded in 1406.
