= Kyoto Shiyakusho-mae Station =

Metro station in Kyoto, Japan

T12 Kyoto Shiyakusho-mae Station 京都市役所前駅
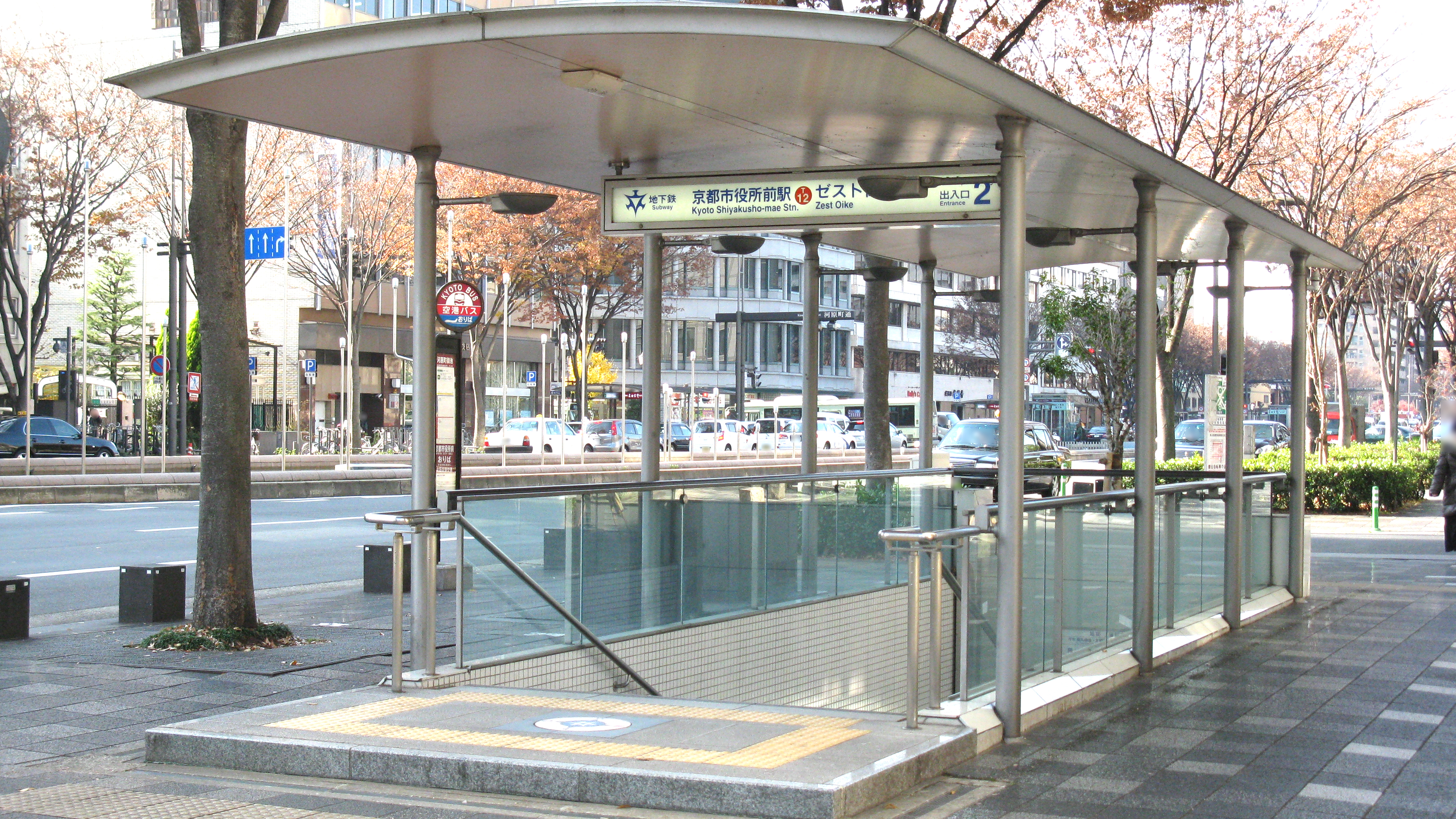
- Entrance No. 2 in 2011

General information
- Coordinates: 35°00′40″N 135°46′08″E
- Operator: Kyoto Municipal Subway
- Line: Tōzai Line
- Platforms: 1 island platform
- Tracks: 2

Other information
- Station code: T12

History
- Opened: 12 October 1997; 28 years ago

Passengers
- FY2016: 27,075 daily

Services
Preceding station	Kyoto Municipal Subway	Following station
Karasuma Oike T13 towards Uzumasa Tenjingawa	Tōzai Line	Sanjō Keihan T11 towards Rokujizō
Location

Kyoto Shiyakusho-mae Station (京都市役所前駅 Kyōto shiyakusho-mae eki) is a stop on the Tozai Line of Kyoto Municipal Subway in Kyoto, Japan. It is in Nakagyo-ku. With the station number designation T12, its station color is kara kurenai. Because it lies beneath the Kawaramachi-Oike intersection, the station also carries signs with the name Kawaramachi Oike.

The station has one island platform serving two tracks. Most trains of the Keihan Railway Keishin Line make their last stop at Kyoto Shiyakusho-mae before reversing direction.

The station, the name of which means "in front of City Hall," is the closest to the offices of Kyoto's city government. The Honnō-ji was rebuilt nearby, rather than at its original location, following the Incident at Honnōji. Also in the vicinity is the Kyoto office of the Bank of Japan.

== History ==
The Kyoto Shiyakusho-mae Station opened on October 12, 1997, date when the Tōzai line initiated operations between Daigo Station and Nijō Station.

== Layout ==
Kyoto Shiyakusho-mae Station has an island platform with two tracks under Oike Dori and Kawaramachi Dori.

1	■ Tōzai Line	for Karasuma Oike and Uzumasa Tenjingawa
2	■ Tōzai Line	for Misasagi, Rokujizō and (Keihan Railway Keishin Line) Hamaōtsu

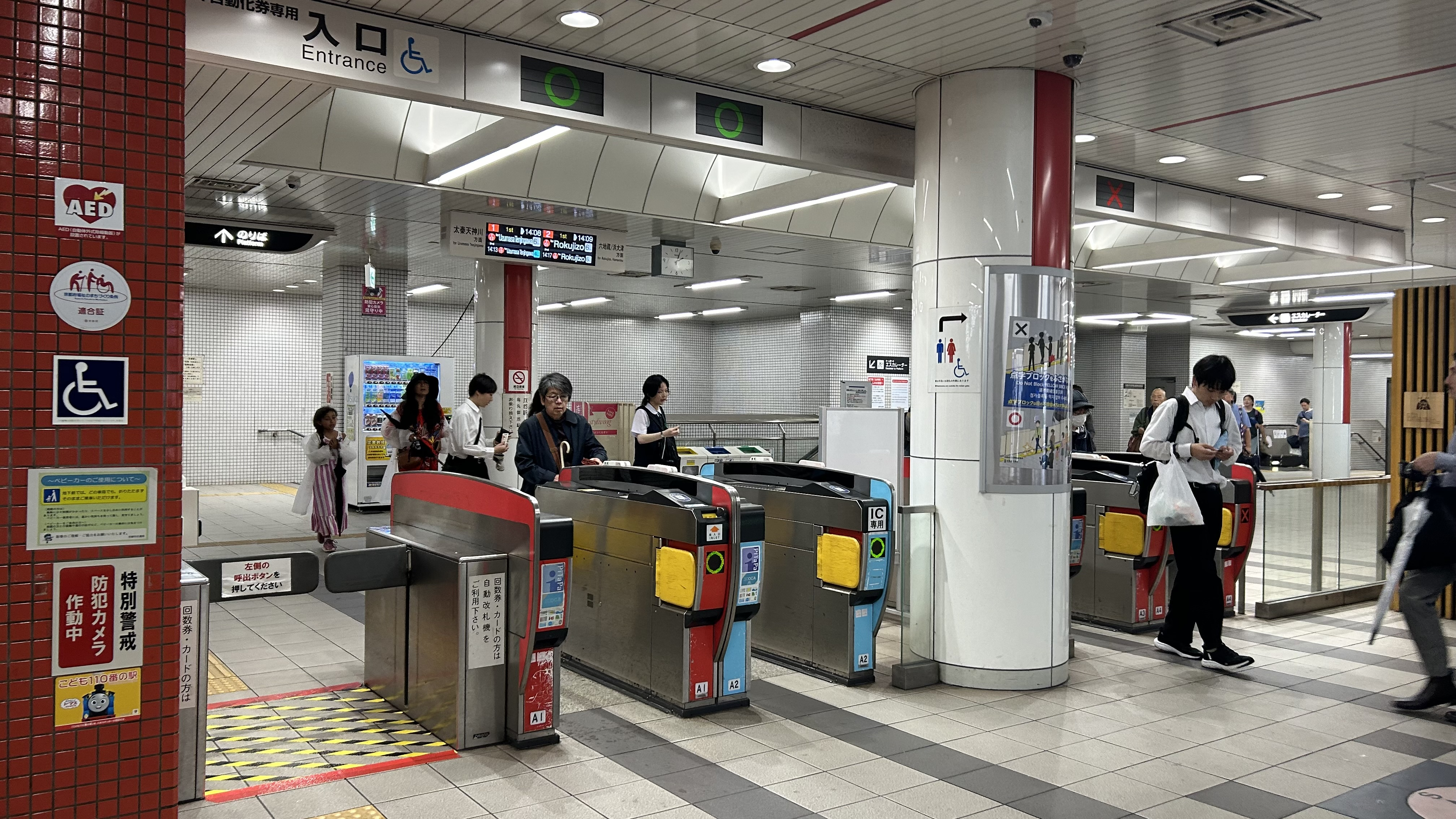
Ticket gates

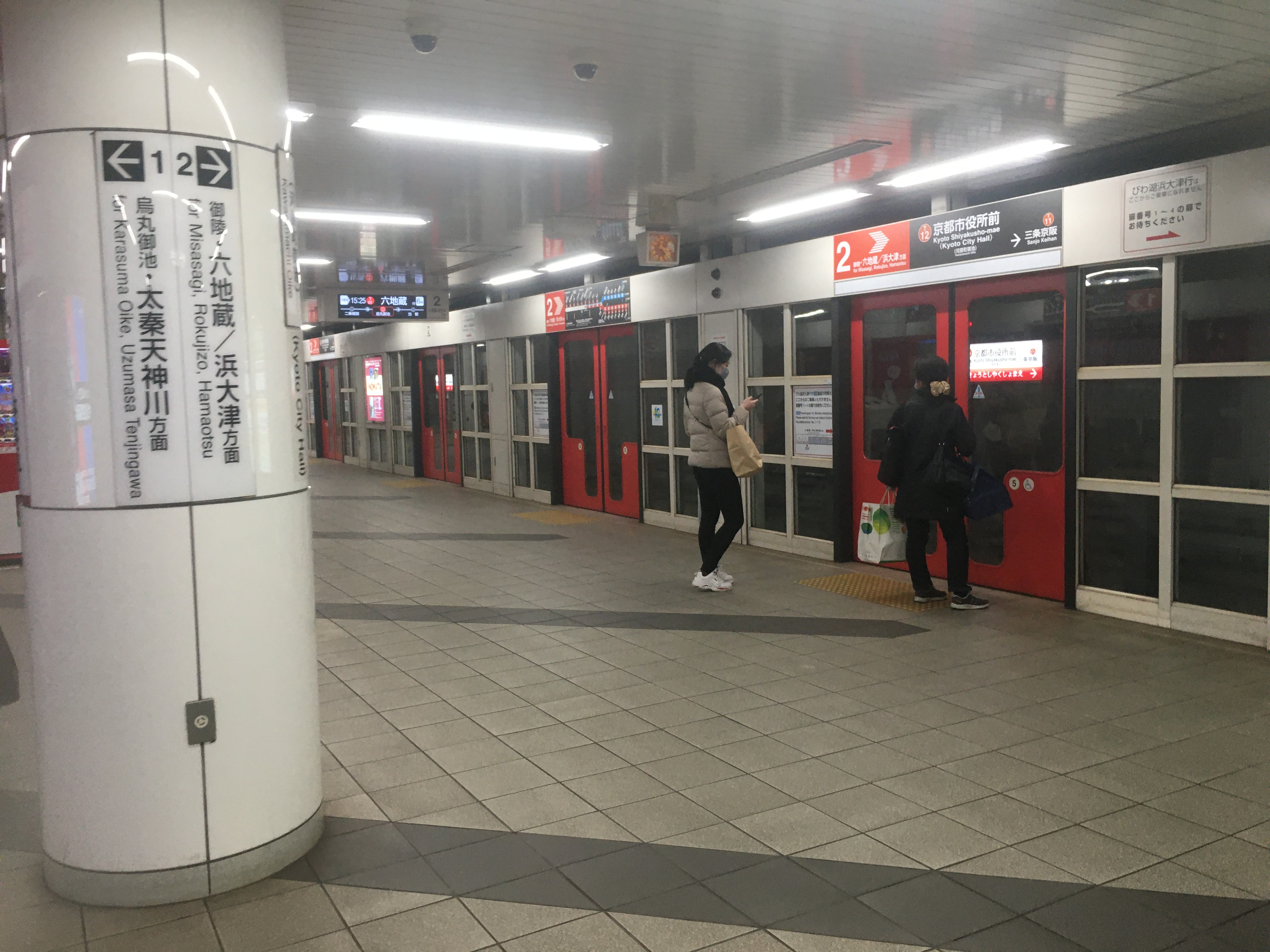
Platform

== Surroundings ==
- Kyoto City Hall
- Kyoto City Fire Department
- Honno-ji
- Bank of Japan Kyoto Office
- Zest Oike
- the site of the Ikedaya Inn
- The Kyoto Hotel Okura
- Kyoto Royal Hotel & Spa (Ishin Hotels Group)
- Hotel Ritz-Carlton Kyoto
- Teramachi Dori
- Shikyogoku Shopping Arcade
- Shimadzu Memorial Hall
