= Misasagi Station =

Railway and metro station in Kyoto, Japan

T08 Misasagi Station 御陵駅
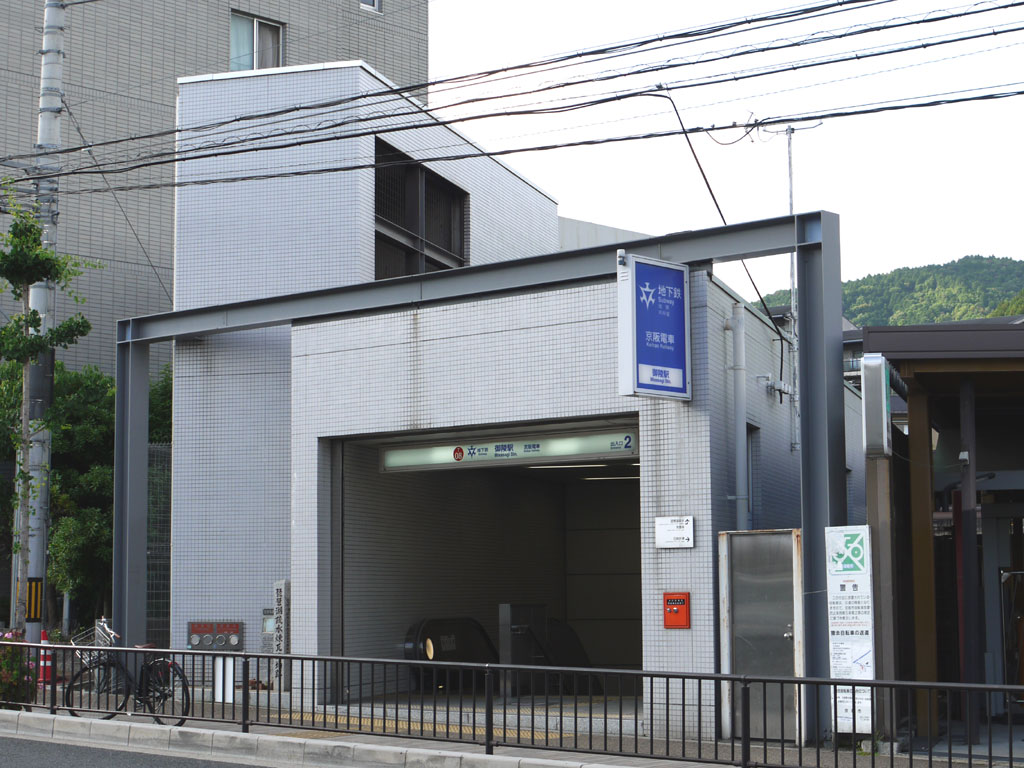
- Misasagi Station entrance, June 2009

General information
- Location: Misasagi-Haranishicho, Yamashina, Kyoto, Kyoto （京都市山科区御陵原西町） Japan
- Coordinates: 34°59′46.04″N 135°48′5.84″E
- System: Kyoto City Subway and Keihan Railway station
- Operator: Kyoto Municipal Transportation Bureau; Keihan Electric Railway
- Lines: Tōzai Line; Keishin Line
- Platforms: 2 island platforms (1 on each level)
- Tracks: 4 (2 on each level)

Construction
- Structure type: Underground

Other information
- Station code: T08

History
- Opened: 15 August 1912; 114 years ago
- Rebuilt: 1997; 29 years ago

Passengers
- FY2023: 7,707 daily (Subway)
Services
Preceding station	Kyoto Municipal Subway	Following station
Keage T09 towards Uzumasa Tenjingawa	Tōzai Line	Yamashina T07 towards Rokujizō
Keage T09 towards Uzumasa Tenjingawa	Tōzai Line	through to Keihan Keishin Line
Preceding station	Keihan Electric Railway	Following station
through to Tōzai Line	Keishin Line	Keihan-yamashina towards Biwako-hamaotsu
Former services
Preceding station	Keihan Electric Railway	Following station
Hinooka towards Keishin-Sanjō	Keishin Line (closed 1997)	Keihan Yamashina towards Biwako-hamaotsu
Location

Misasagi Station (御陵駅, Misasagi-eki) is a train station in Yamashina-ku ward, Kyoto City, Kyoto Prefecture, Japan.

== Lines ==
- Kyoto City Subway
  - Tozai Line
- Keihan Electric Railway
  - Keishin Line – Misasagi is the terminus of the line.

== Layout ==
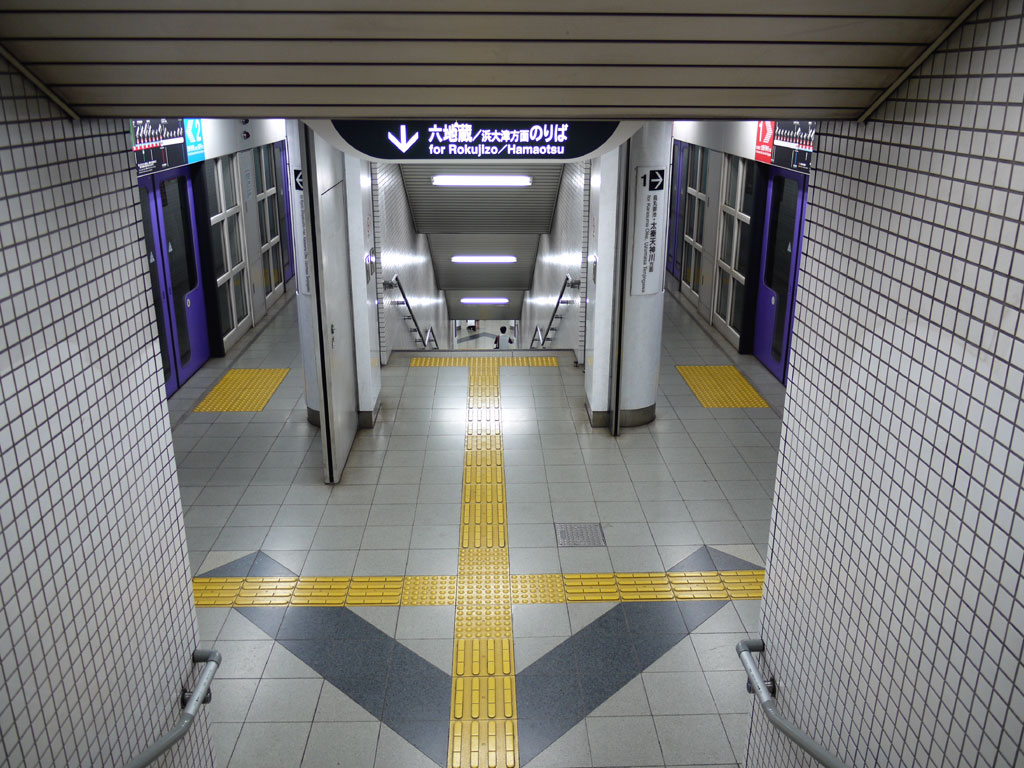
Platforms 1 and 2 of the station

The station is a cross-platform interchange between the Tōzai Line and the Keihan Keishin Line, with two tracks and one island platform on both the second and third basement levels. The westbound platform (which is used for trains to Uzumasa Tenjingawa) is stacked above the eastbound platform (which is used for trains to Rokujizō and Biwako-Hamaotsu).

2nd basement

1	■ Kyoto Subway Tōzai Line	from Rokujizō for Kyōto Shiyakusho-mae, Karasuma Oike and Uzumasa Tenjingawa
2	■ Kyoto Subway Tōzai Line	from Hamaōtsu for Kyōto Shiyakusho-mae, Karasuma Oike and Uzumasa Tenjingawa

3rd basement

3	■ Kyoto Subway Tōzai Line	for Yamashina and Rokujizō
4	■ Keihan Railway Keishin Line	for Shinomiya and Biwako-hamaotsu

== History ==
The station originally opened on 15 August 1912 as an at-grade railway station on the Keihan Keishin Line. On 12 October 1997, the at-grade station was replaced with an underground station when the first phase of the Tōzai Line opened.
