= Rokujizō Station (JR West) =

Railway and metro station in Uji, Kyoto Prefecture, Japan

Rokujizō Station 六地蔵駅

General information
- Location: Uji, Kyoto (宇治市); Japan
- Operator: JR West; Kyoto Municipal Transportation Bureau
Location
- Location within Kyoto Prefecture Location within Japan

Rokujizō Station (六地蔵駅 Rokujizō-eki) refers to two different railway stations of the same name, located within the same vicinity in Rokujizo Naramachi, Uji, Kyoto, each operated by a different train company. The station name means "Six Jizō". JR West Station number is JR-D06, and the Kyoto Municipal subway station number is T01.

== Lines ==
Each of the following two lines has its own Rokujizō Station facilities:

- JR West Nara Line
- Kyoto City Subway Tozai Line

Firstly, there is the relatively recent addition of a station at the terminus of the Subway Tozai Line that runs from Uzumasa Tenjingawa Station in Kyoto down to the southeastern part of the city. Secondly, in proximity to the municipal subway station is the station operated by West Japan Railway Company, on the Nara Line. Rapid trains from Kyoto now also stop here (in addition to the local trains) and the trip normally takes no longer than 12 minutes.

== Overview ==
In 1992, the JR station was established in the Uji City side, and the subway station was opened in 2004, and the Nara Line of JR West, and the railway station on the Tozai line of the subway have the same name. Rokujizō Station is the only Kyoto Municipal Subway station located outside Kyoto.

JR and subway stations are almost the same position as the ground and underground, but the Keihan station is about 400m southwest, and the two stations are contacted via a public road along the Yamashina River. The JR West station uses ICOCA, and the Keihan and subway stations are included in the use area of PiTaPa and "Slussen and Kansai". In addition, the subway station also supports the Traffica Kyoto card.

== Layout ==
=== JR West ===
D 06 Rokujizō Station 六地蔵駅
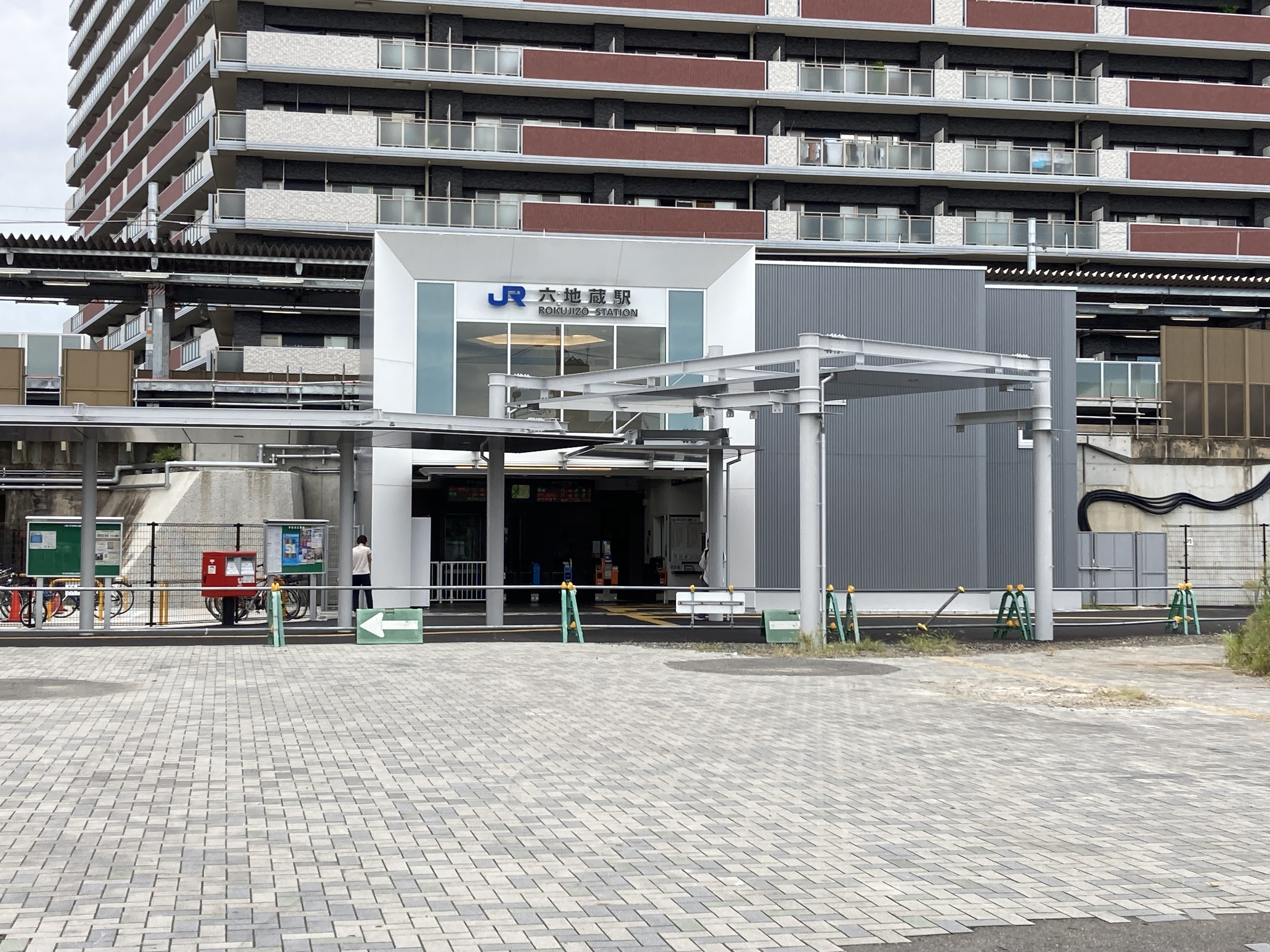
- JR West Rokujizō Station

General information
- Location: 16-8, Rokujizo Naramachi, Uji, Kyoto （京都府宇治市六地蔵奈良町16-8） Japan
- Coordinates: 34°55′59″N 135°47′48″E
- System: JR West station
- Operator: JR West
- Line: Nara Line
- Platforms: 1 Island platform
- Tracks: 2

Construction
- Structure type: Elevated

Other information
- Station code: JR-D06

History
- Opened: 1992; 34 years ago

Passengers
- FY 2023: 15,174 daily
Location

The JR West station is elevated with an island platform located between two tracks. The station's ticket gates are located in only one area. There platform gap is noticeably wide because the station is located on a curved section of track. A comb-like rubber layer is installed along the edge of the platform. The rubber has the strength that can support the weight of the passenger, and it is said that there is no safety problem even when the rubber and the vehicle are in contact.

In addition, by moving the station platform to the Kyoto direction of the curve in accordance with the double-tracking project for the Nara Line, measures will be taken to widen the platform and reduce the gap between the train and the platform.

1 (main track)	■ Nara Line	for Kyoto (all trains) for Uji and Nara (part of local trains in the non-rush hour)
2	■ Nara Line	for Uji and Nara (except above)

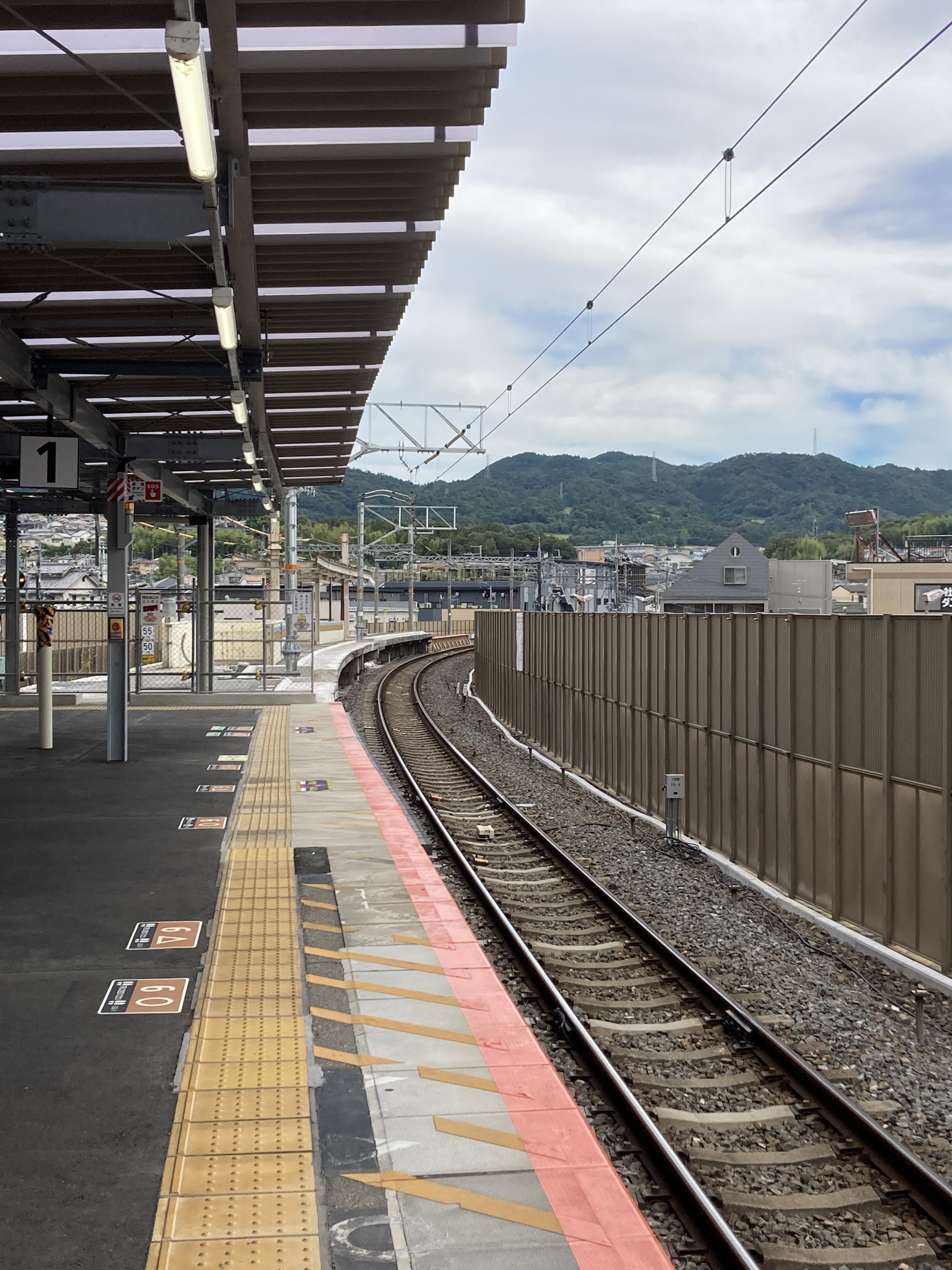
Platform

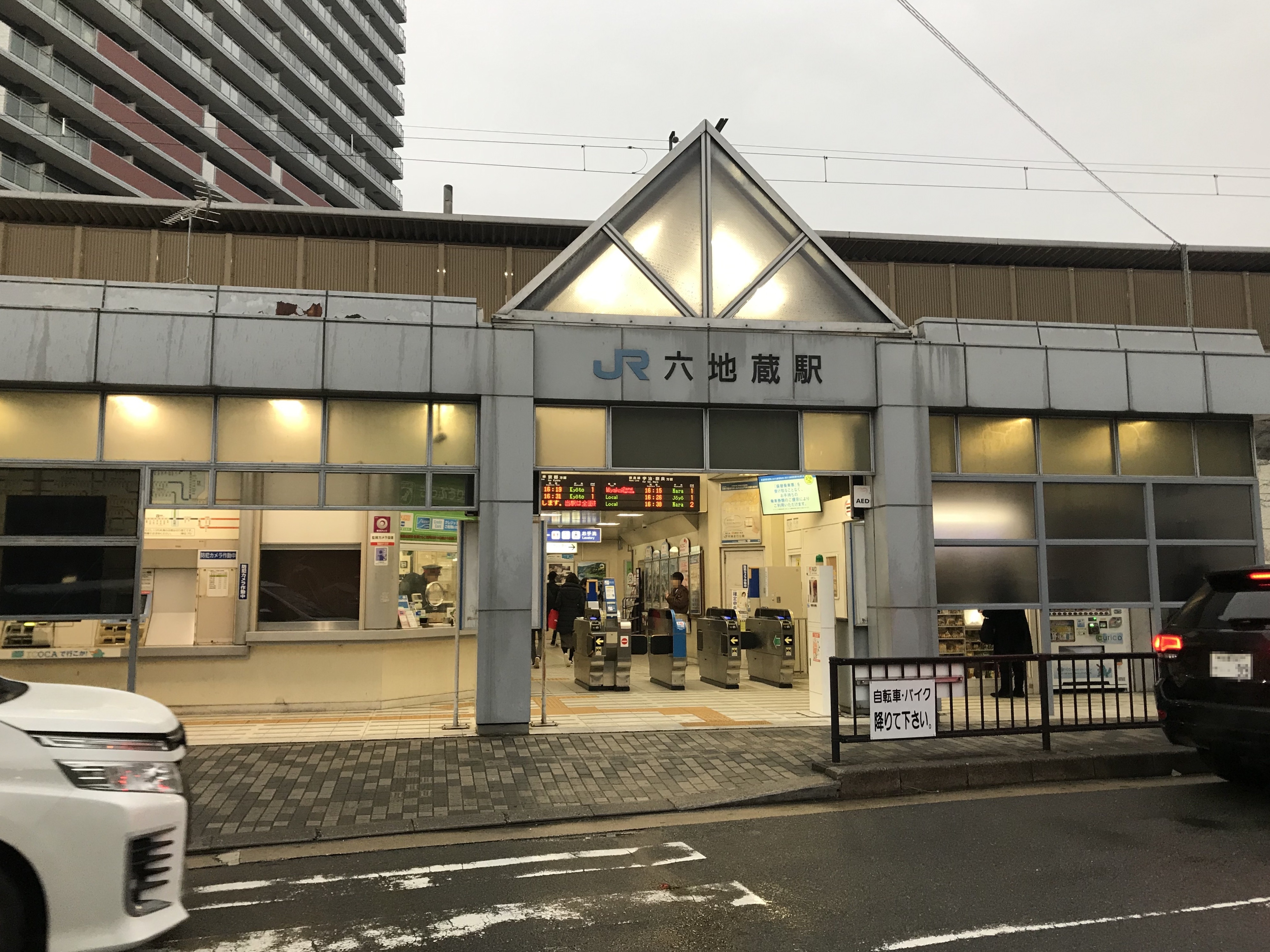
Former building

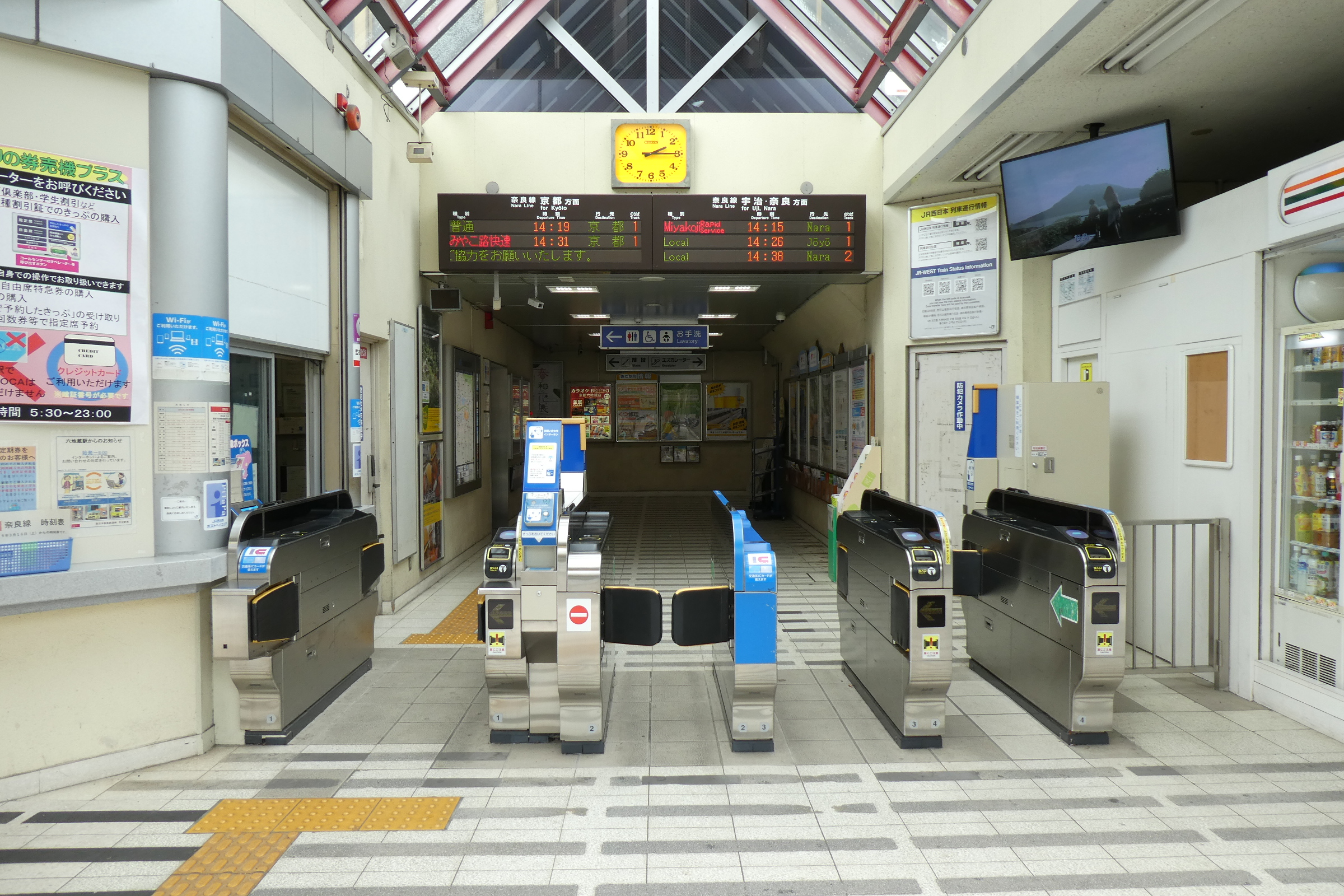
Former ticket gates

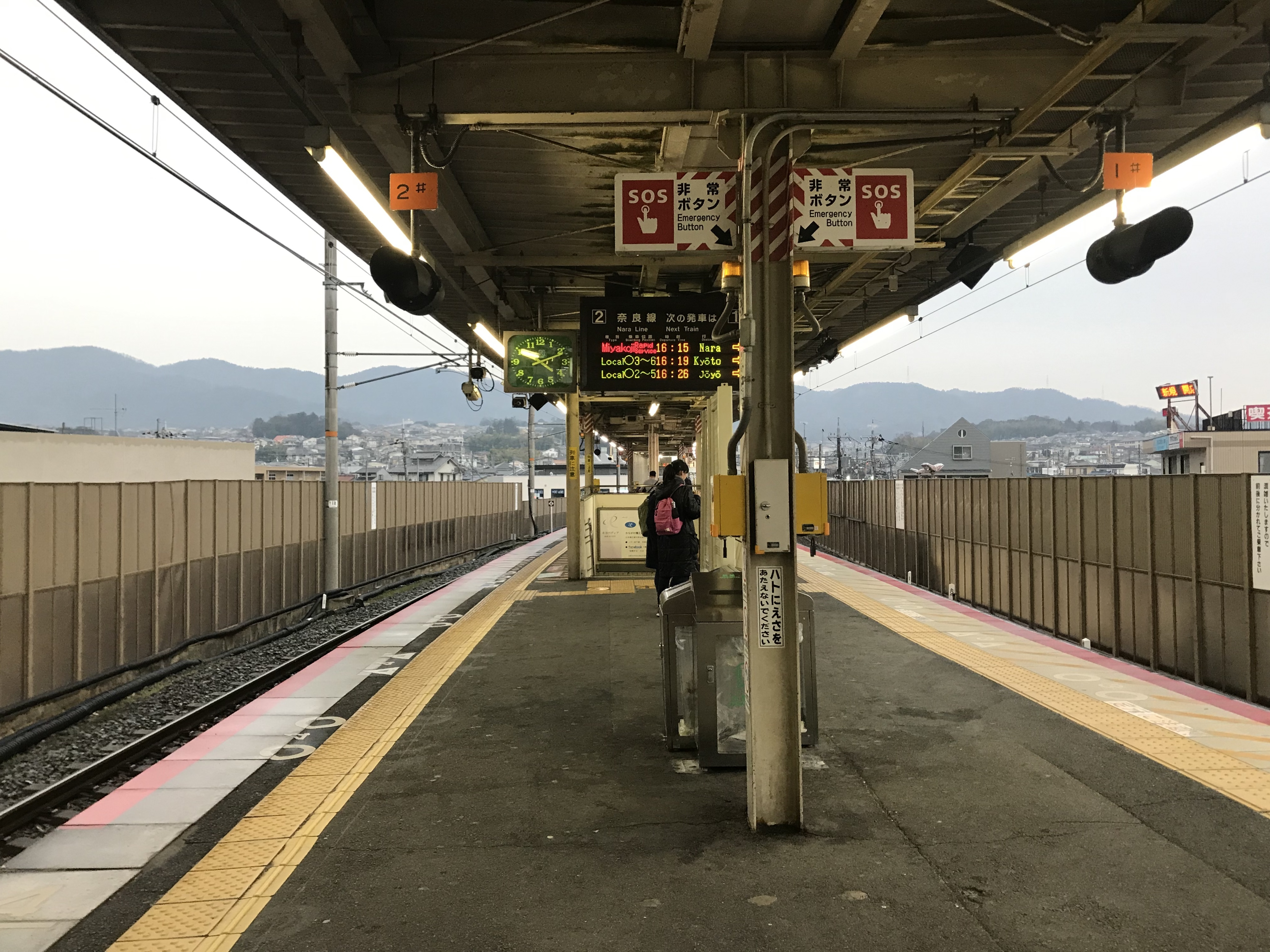
Former platform

=== Kyoto Subway Tozai Line ===
T01 Rokujizo Station 六地蔵駅
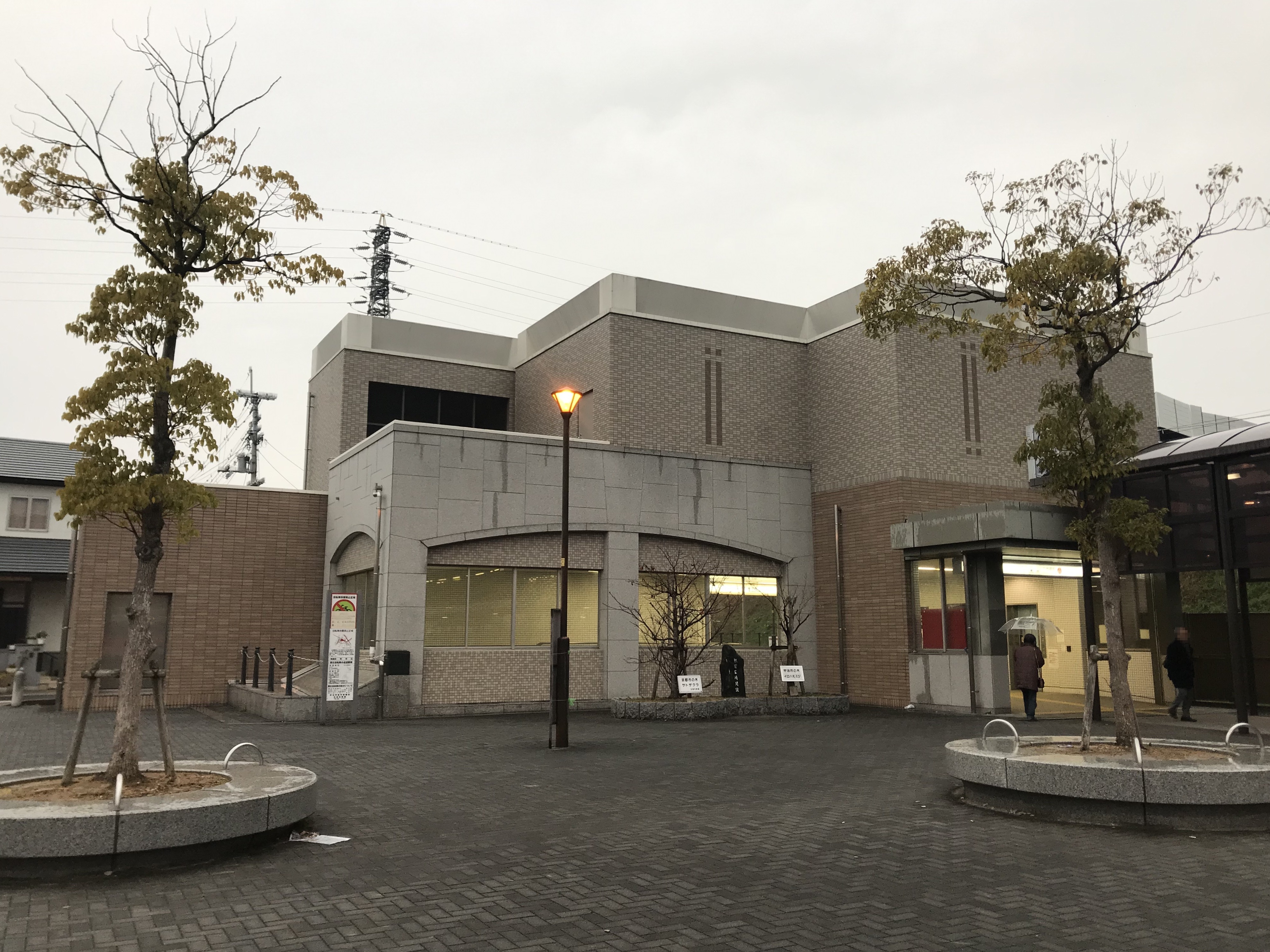
- Entrance of Subway Rokujizo Station

General information
- Location: Rokujizo Naramachi, Uji, Kyoto （京都府宇治市六地蔵奈良町） Japan
- Coordinates: 34°56′01″N 135°47′47″E
- System: Kyoto City Subway station
- Operator: Kyoto Municipal Transportation Bureau
- Line: Tōzai Line
- Platforms: 1 island platform
- Tracks: 2

Other information
- Station code: T01

History
- Opened: 2004; 22 years ago

Passengers
- FY2023: 12,773 daily

Services
Preceding station	Kyoto Municipal Subway	Following station
Ishida T02 towards Uzumasa Tenjingawa	Tōzai Line	Terminus
Location

The underground station has an island platform serving two tracks with platform screen doors installed.

Only one entrance with ticket gate exists. Each station of the Tozai Line has a colour scheme, with the station color for Rokujizō being Wasurenagusa-iro(forget-me-not).

The station number of Rokujizō Station is T01.

1, 2	■ Tozai Line	for Yamashina and Uzumasa Tenjingawa

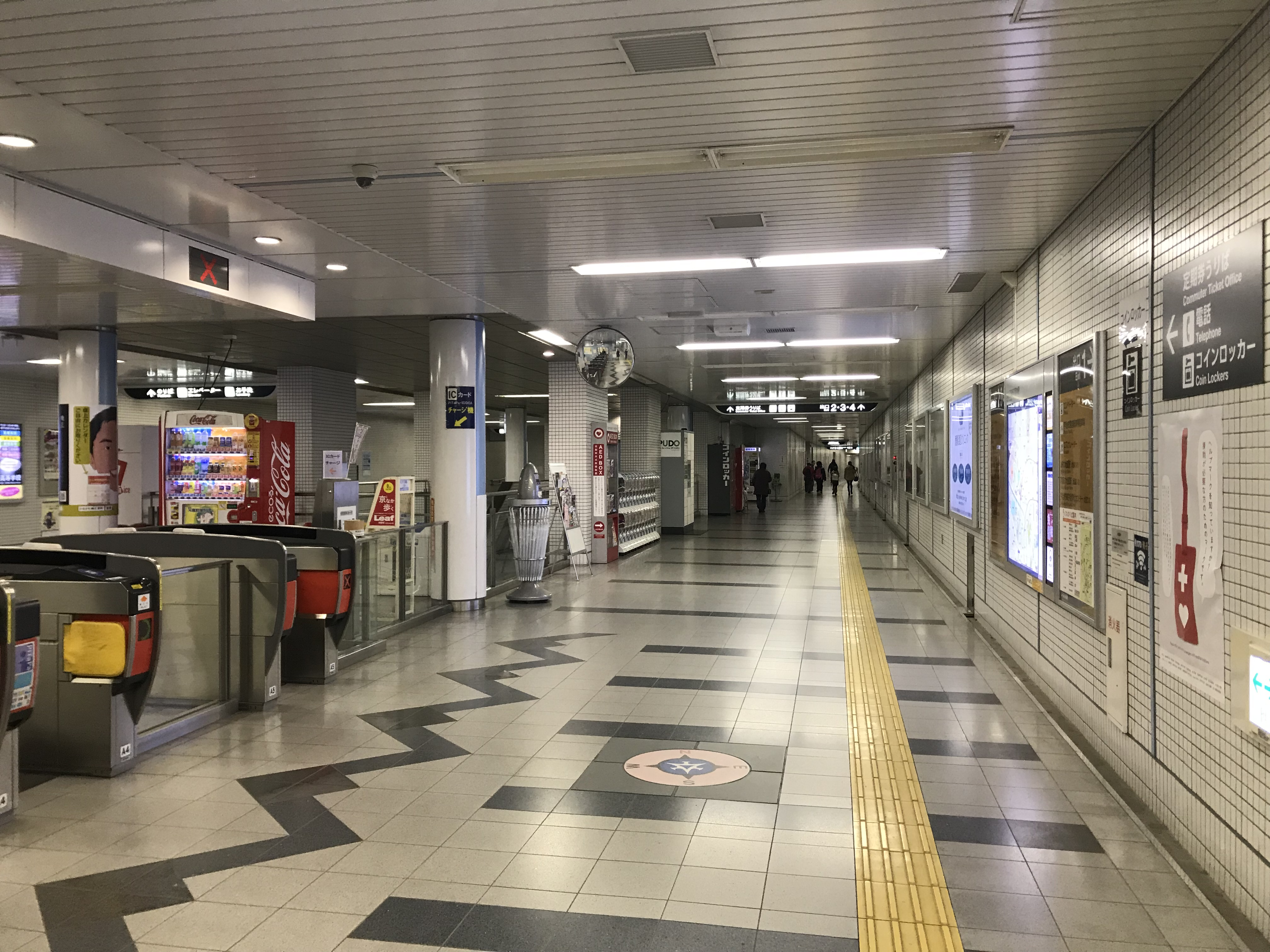
Concourse

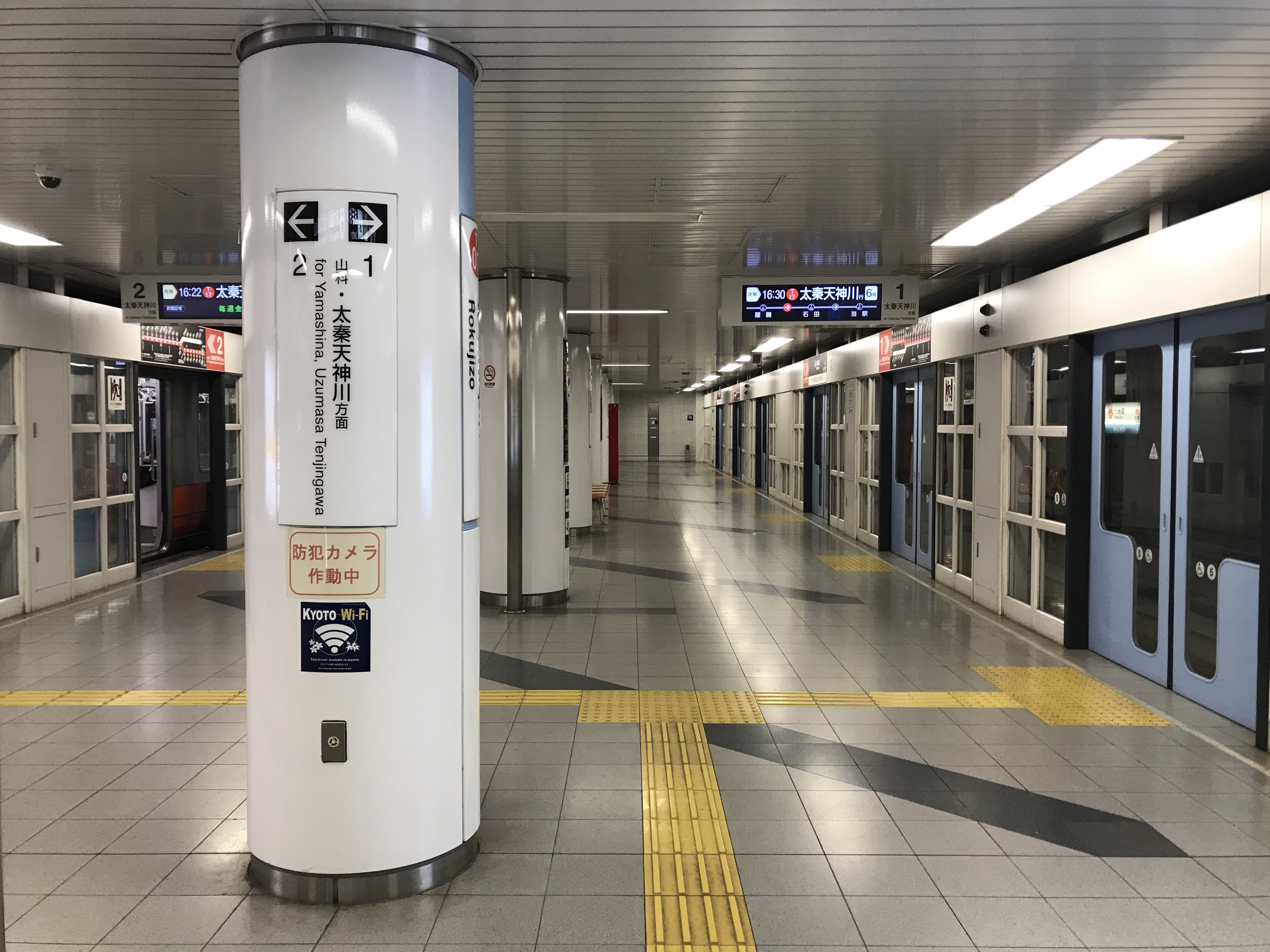
Platform

== History ==
The oldest railway in this area is the Nara Line which has been operating since 1896, but the Nara Line did not have its station in Rokujizō until 1992.

The present-day JR West station opened on 22 October 1992, and the subway station opened on 26 November 2004.

Station numbering was introduced to the JR West platforms in March 2018 with Rokujizō being assigned station number JR-D06.

== Usage information ==
The transition of the number of users is as follows.

What is written here is the number of people who took the train.

Year	JR West	Kyoto Subway
1999	5,270	Not opened
2000	5,342	Not opened
2001	5,795	Not opened
2002	6,126	Not opened
2003	6,374	Not opened
2004	6,416	5,508
2005	6,523	5,632
2006	6,647	5,683
2007	6,706	5,742
2008	6,822	5,775
2009	6,789	5,816
2010	6,945	5,837
2011	7,232	5,929
2012	7,394	6,042
2013	7,658	6,222
2014	7,581	6,387
2015	7,751	6,597
2016	7,638	6,683
2017	7,556	6,710
2018	7,493	6,900
2019	7,530	6,969
2020	5,915	5,282
2021	6,225	5,436
2022	6,940	5,845

== Surrounding area ==
The surrounding area has a number of hotels, extensive shops, restaurants and amusement centers. It has undergone significant development in recent years as more people choose to live there or nearby and make use of the excellent transport links to downtown area of Kyoto.

- Daizen-ji
- MOMO Terrace
- Kyoto Animation Studio 1
- Izumiya Rokujizo

== Adjacent stations ==
«	Service	»
JR West Nara Line
Momoyama	Local	Kohata
Tofukuji	Regional Rapid Service	Uji
Tofukuji	Rapid Service	Uji
Tofukuji	Miyakoji Rapid Service	Uji
Kyoto Municipal Subway Tozai Line (T01)
Terminus	-	Ishida (T02)
