= 50 series =

50 series may refer to:

== Electronics ==
- HP 49/50 series, a type of graphing calculator made by Hewlett-Packard
- Nvidia GeForce RTX 50 series, a series of graphic cards

== Trains ==
- 1–50 series (CTA), a retired subway car type for the Chicago Transit Authority
- EMD SD50, also known as "50 series", a North American diesel locomotive type made by Electro-Motive Diesel
- Kyoto Municipal Subway 50 series operating for the Kyoto Municipal Subway

== Trucks ==
- Dodge 50 Series, a box truck model operating in Europe

== See also ==
- Detroit Diesel Series 50, a diesel engine for heavy-duty vehicles
