= Nagitsuji Station =

Metro station in Kyoto, Japan

T05 Nagitsuji Station 椥辻駅
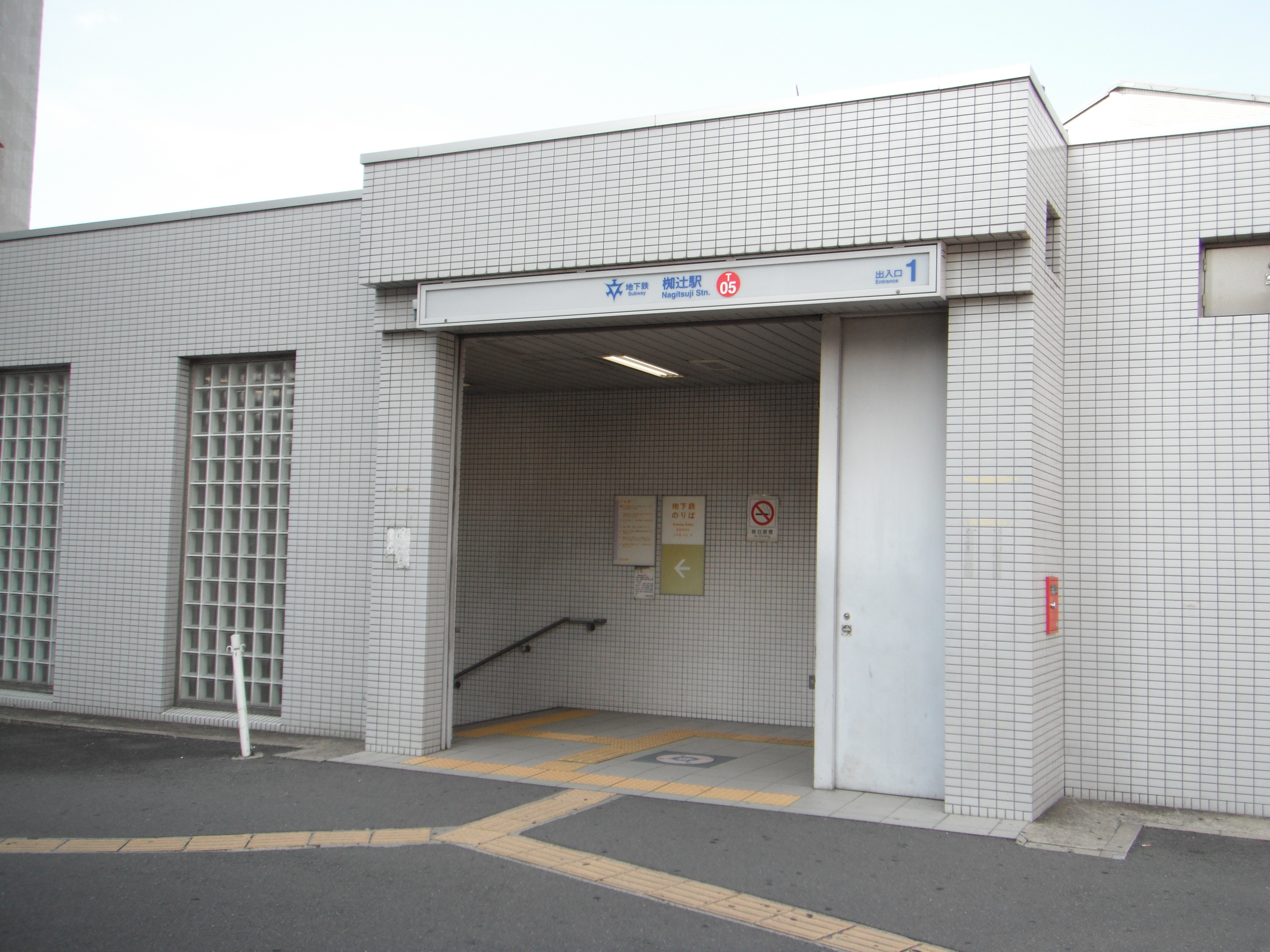
- Entrance No. 1 in 2011

General information
- Coordinates: 34.9728°N 135.8149°E
- Operator: Kyoto Municipal Subway
- Line: Tōzai Line
- Platforms: 1 island platform
- Tracks: 2

Other information
- Station code: T05

History
- Opened: 12 October 1997; 29 years ago

Passengers
- FY2016: 16,151 daily

Services
Preceding station	Kyoto Municipal Subway	Following station
Higashino T06 towards Uzumasa Tenjingawa	Tōzai Line	Ono T04 towards Rokujizō
Location

Nagitsuji Station (椥辻駅, Nagitsuji-eki) is a train station on the Kyoto Municipal Subway Tōzai Line in Yamashina-ku, Kyoto, Japan.

== Lines ==
- Kyoto Municipal Subway
  - Tōzai Line (Station Number: T05)

== Layout ==
The subway station has an island platform serving two tracks separated by platform screen doors.

1	■ Tōzai Line	for Misasagi, Karasuma Oike and Uzumasa Tenjingawa
2	■ Tōzai Line	for Rokujizō

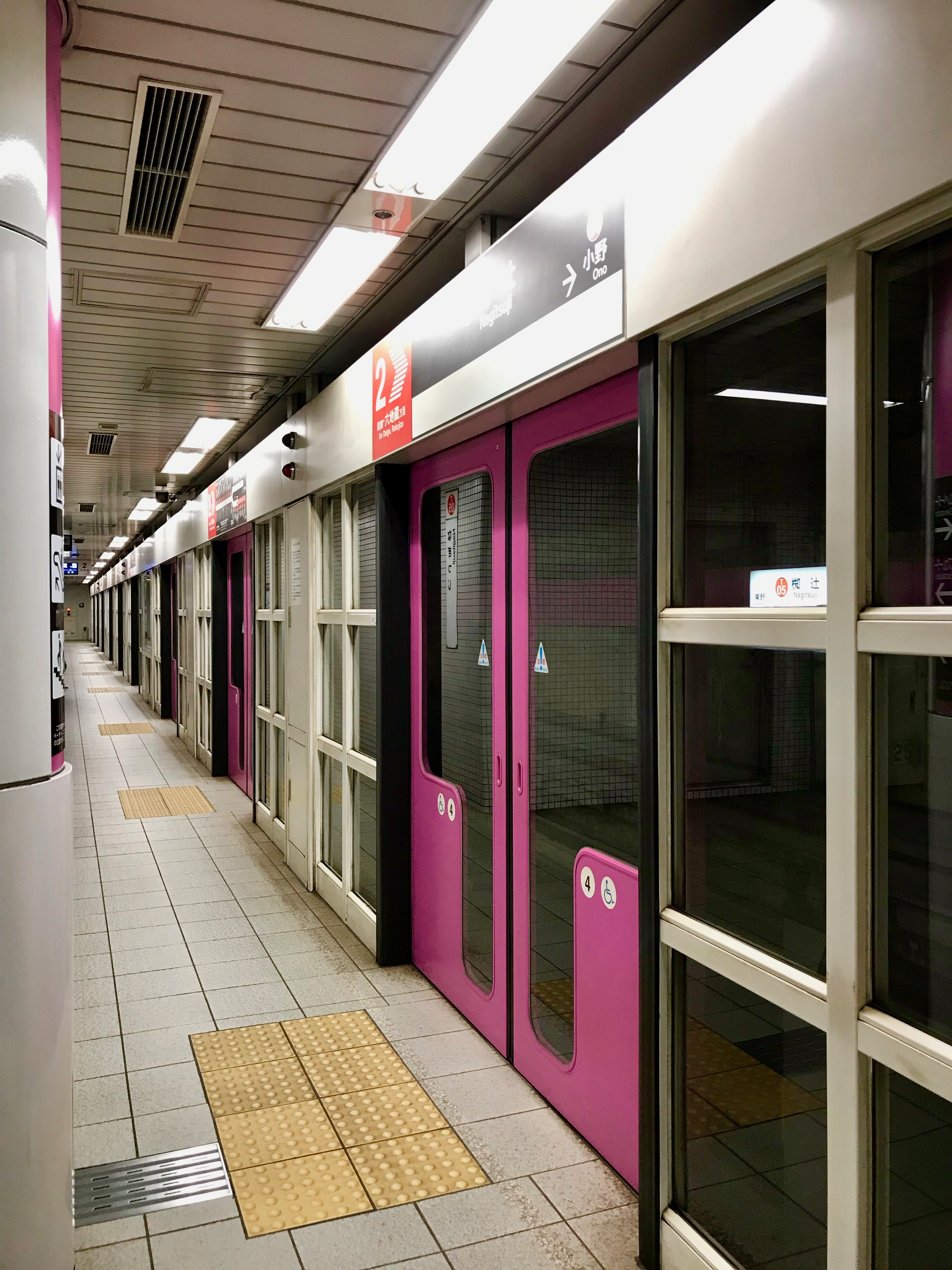
Platform
