= Higashino Station (Kyoto) =

Metro station in Kyoto, Japan

T06 Higashino Station 東野駅
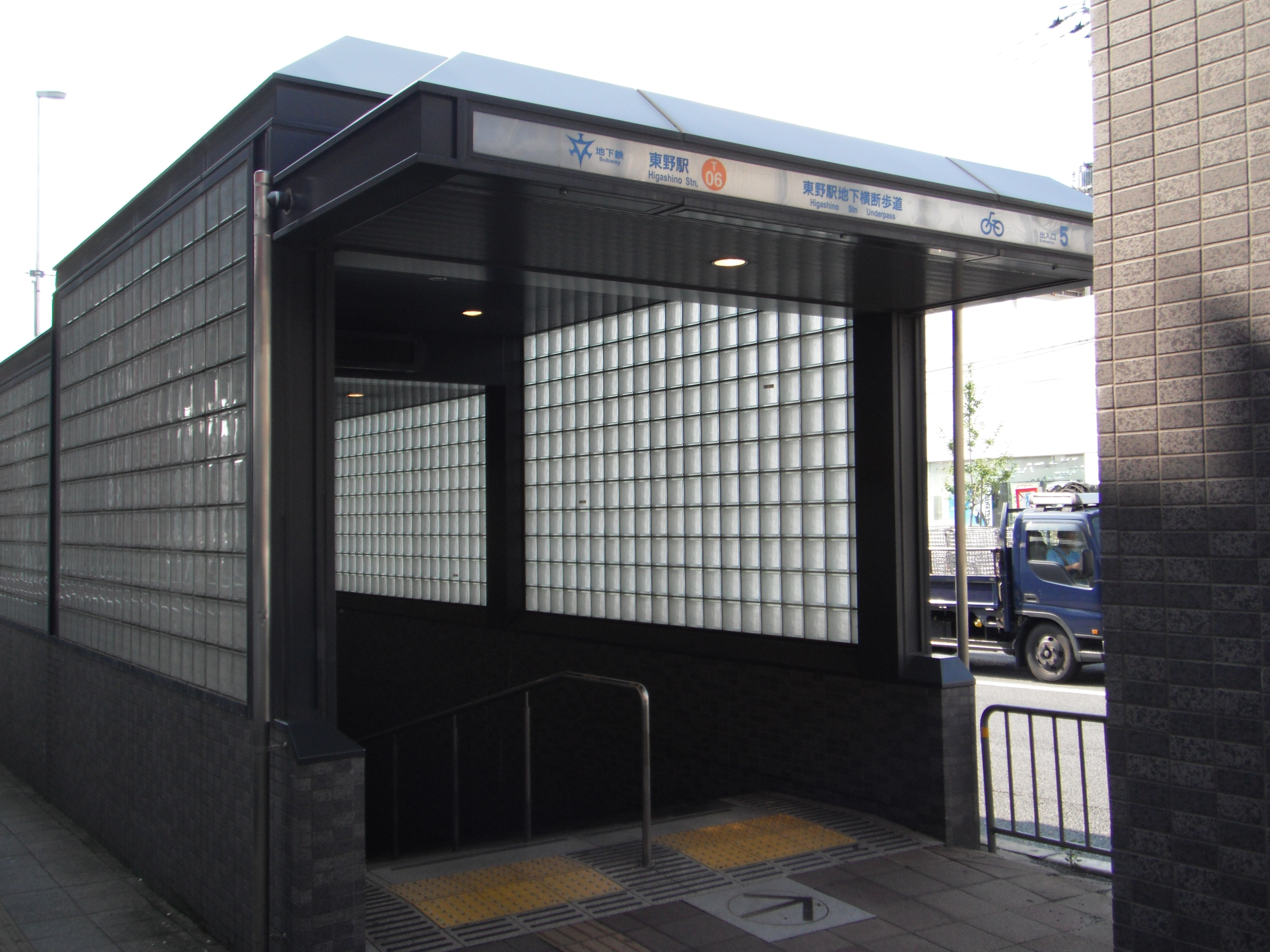
- Entrance No. 5 in 2011

General information
- Coordinates: 34°58′56″N 135°49′00″E
- Operator: Kyoto Municipal Subway
- Line: Tōzai Line
- Platforms: 1
- Tracks: 2

Other information
- Station code: T06

History
- Opened: 12 October 1997; 28 years ago

Passengers
- FY2016: 11,169 daily

Services
Preceding station	Kyoto Municipal Subway	Following station
Yamashina T07 towards Uzumasa Tenjingawa	Tōzai Line	Nagitsuji T05 towards Rokujizō
Location

Higashino Station (東野駅, Higashino-eki) is a train station on the Kyoto Municipal Subway Tōzai Line in Yamashina-ku, Kyoto, Japan.

== Lines ==
- Kyoto Municipal Subway
  - Tōzai Line (Station Number: T06)

== Layout ==
The underground station has an island platform with two tracks.

1	■ Tōzai Line	for Uzumasa Tenjingawa
2	■ Tōzai Line	for Rokujizō

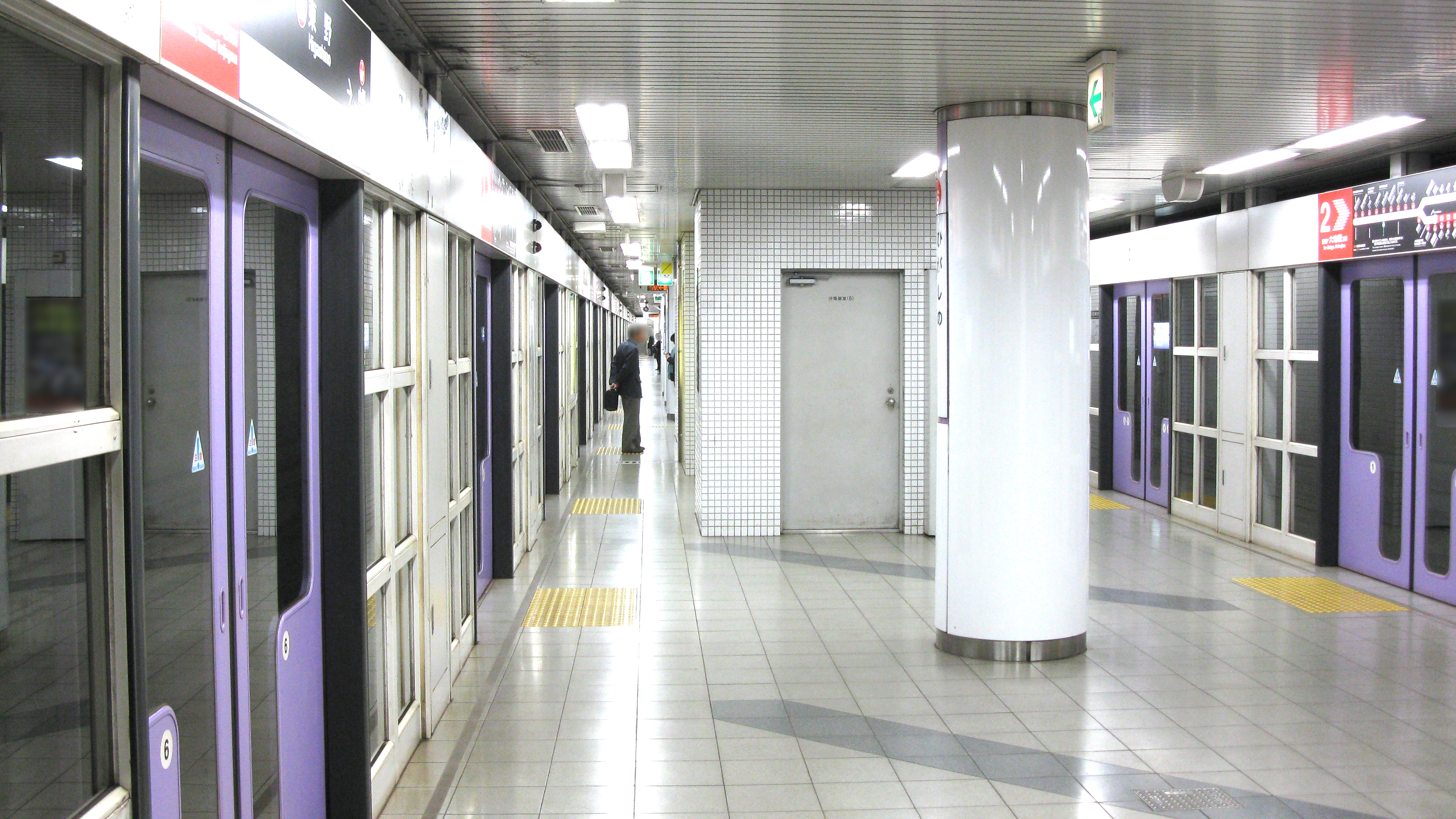
Platform
