= Ono Station (Kyoto) =

Metro station in Kyoto, Japan

T04 Ono Station 小野駅
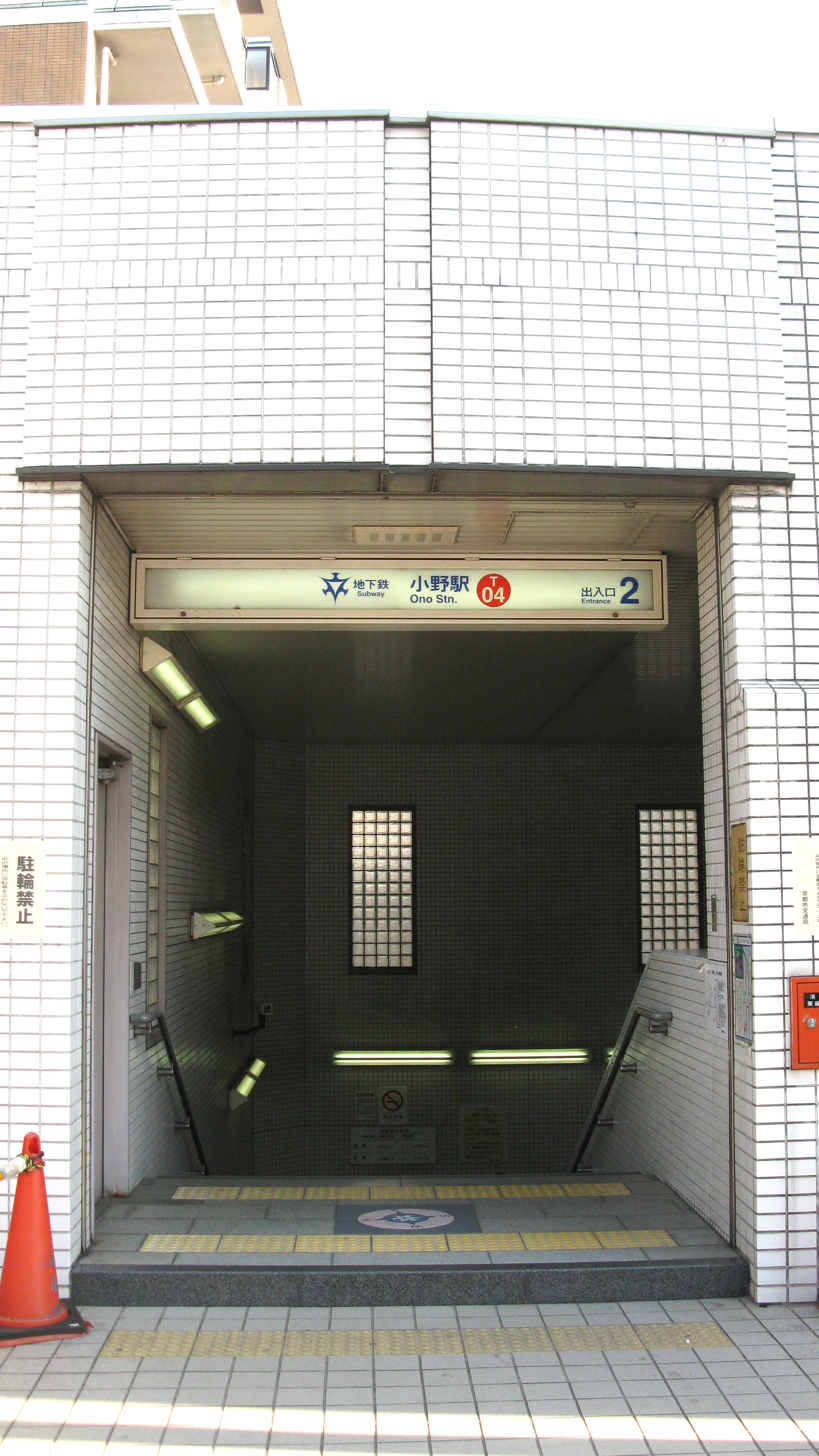
- Entrance No.2 in 2011

General information
- Coordinates: 34°57′40″N 135°48′46″E
- Operator: Kyoto Municipal Subway
- Line: Tōzai Line
- Platforms: 1 island platform
- Tracks: 2

Other information
- Station code: T04

History
- Opened: 12 October 1997; 28 years ago

Passengers
- FY2016: 7,003 daily

Services
Preceding station	Kyoto Municipal Subway	Following station
Nagitsuji T05 towards Uzumasa Tenjingawa	Tōzai Line	Daigo T03 towards Rokujizō
Location

Ono Station (小野駅, Ono-eki) is a train station on the Kyoto Municipal Subway Tōzai Line in Yamashina-ku, Kyoto, Japan.

== Lines ==
- Kyoto Municipal Subway
  - Tōzai Line (Station Number: T04)

== Layout ==
The underground station has an island platform with two tracks.

1	■ Tōzai Line	for Uzumasa Tenjingawa
2	■ Tōzai Line	for Rokujizō

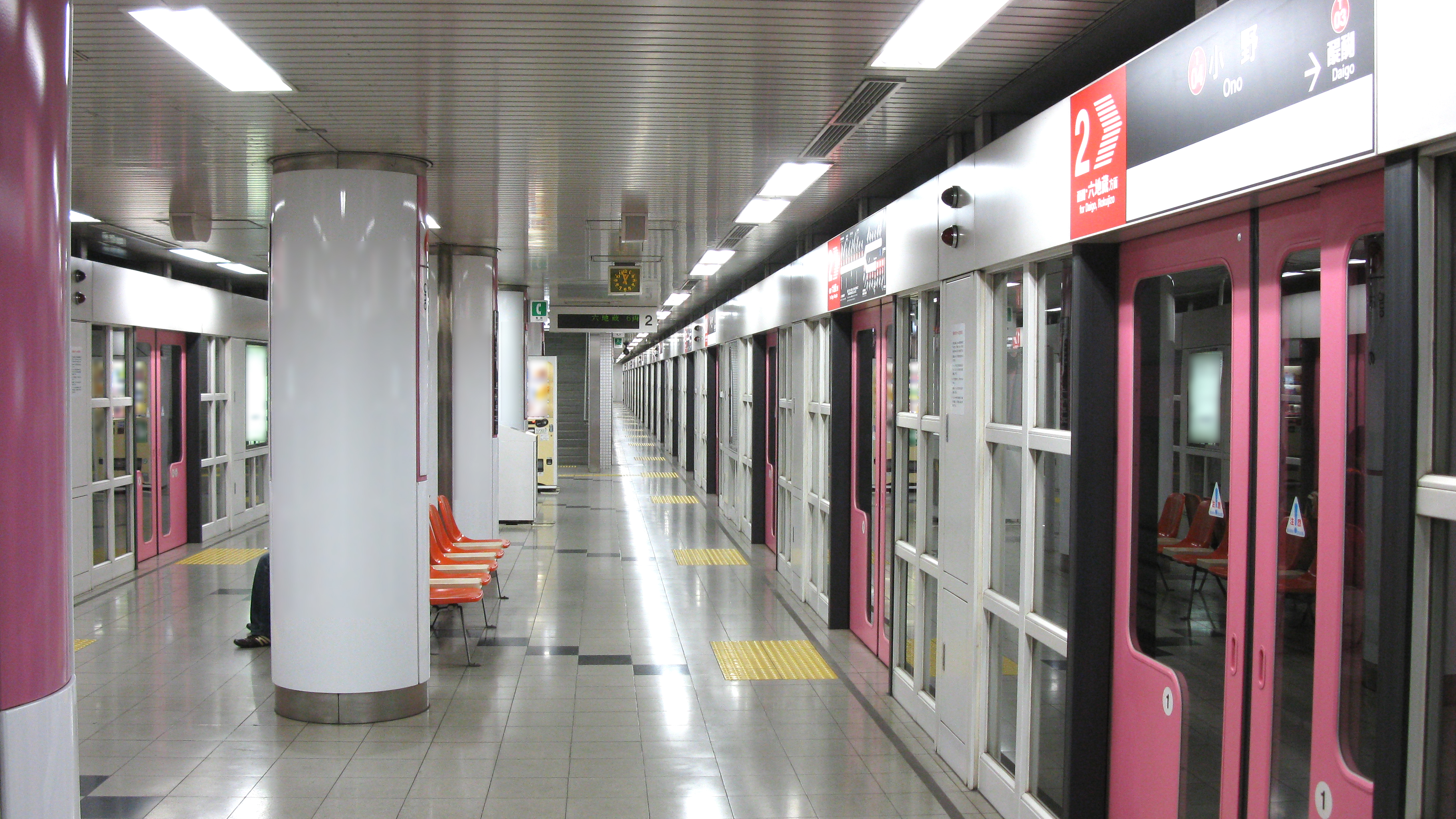
Platform
