= Ishida Station (Kyoto) =

Metro station in Kyoto, Japan

T02 Ishida Station 石田駅
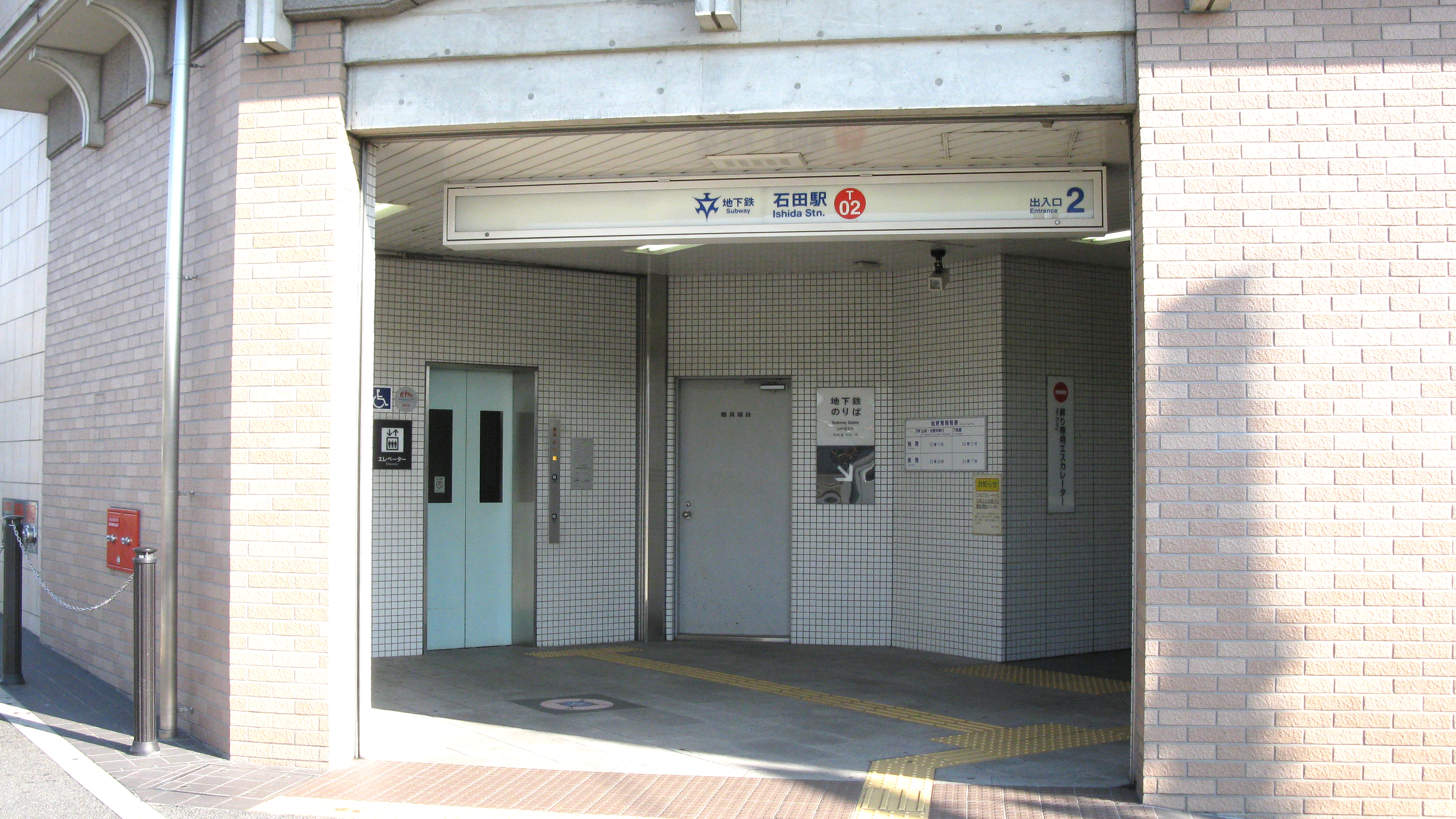
- Entrance No.2 in 2011

General information
- Location: Ishida Mori Higashimachi; Fushimi Ward, Kyoto; Japan
- Coordinates: 34°56′26″N 135°48′14″E
- Operator: Kyoto Municipal Subway
- Line: Tōzai Line
- Platforms: 1 island platform
- Tracks: 2

Construction
- Structure type: Underground

Other information
- Station code: T02

History
- Opened: 26 November 2004; 21 years ago

Passengers
- FY2016: 6,506 daily

Services
| Preceding station | Kyoto Municipal Subway | Following station |
|---|---|---|
| Daigo T03 towards Uzumasa Tenjingawa | Tōzai Line | Rokujizō T01 Terminus |
Location

Ishida Station (石田駅, Ishida-eki) is a train station on the Kyoto Municipal Subway Tōzai Line in Fushimi-ku, Kyoto, Japan.

== Lines ==
- Kyoto Municipal Subway
  - Tōzai Line (Station Number: T02)

== Layout ==
The subway station has an island platform serving two tracks separated by platform screen doors.

| 1 | ■ Tōzai Line | for Misasagi, Karasuma Oike and Uzumasa Tenjingawa |
| 2 | ■ Tōzai Line | for Rokujizō |

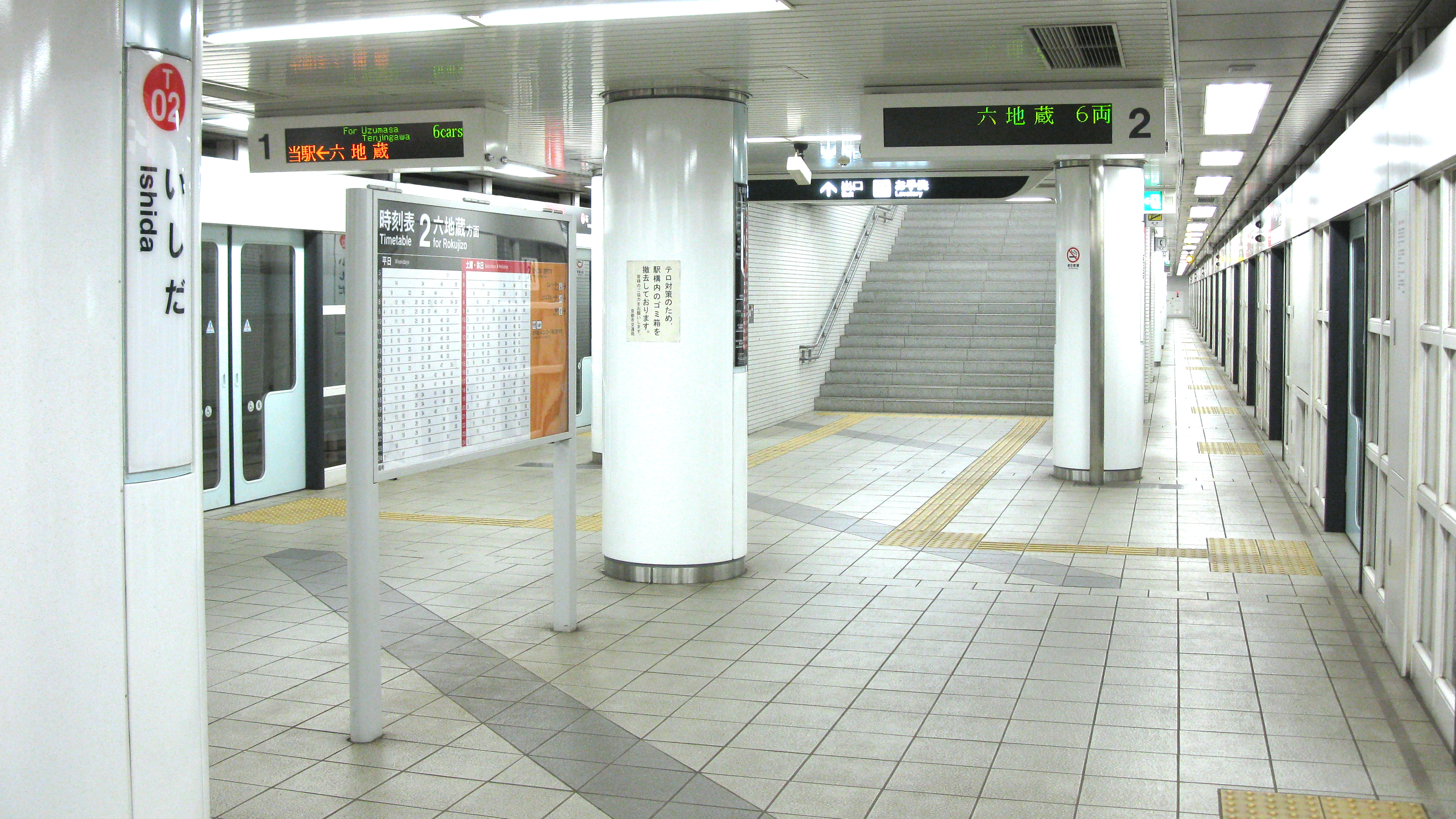
Platform
