= Keage Station =

Metro station in Kyoto, Japan

T09 Keage Station 蹴上駅
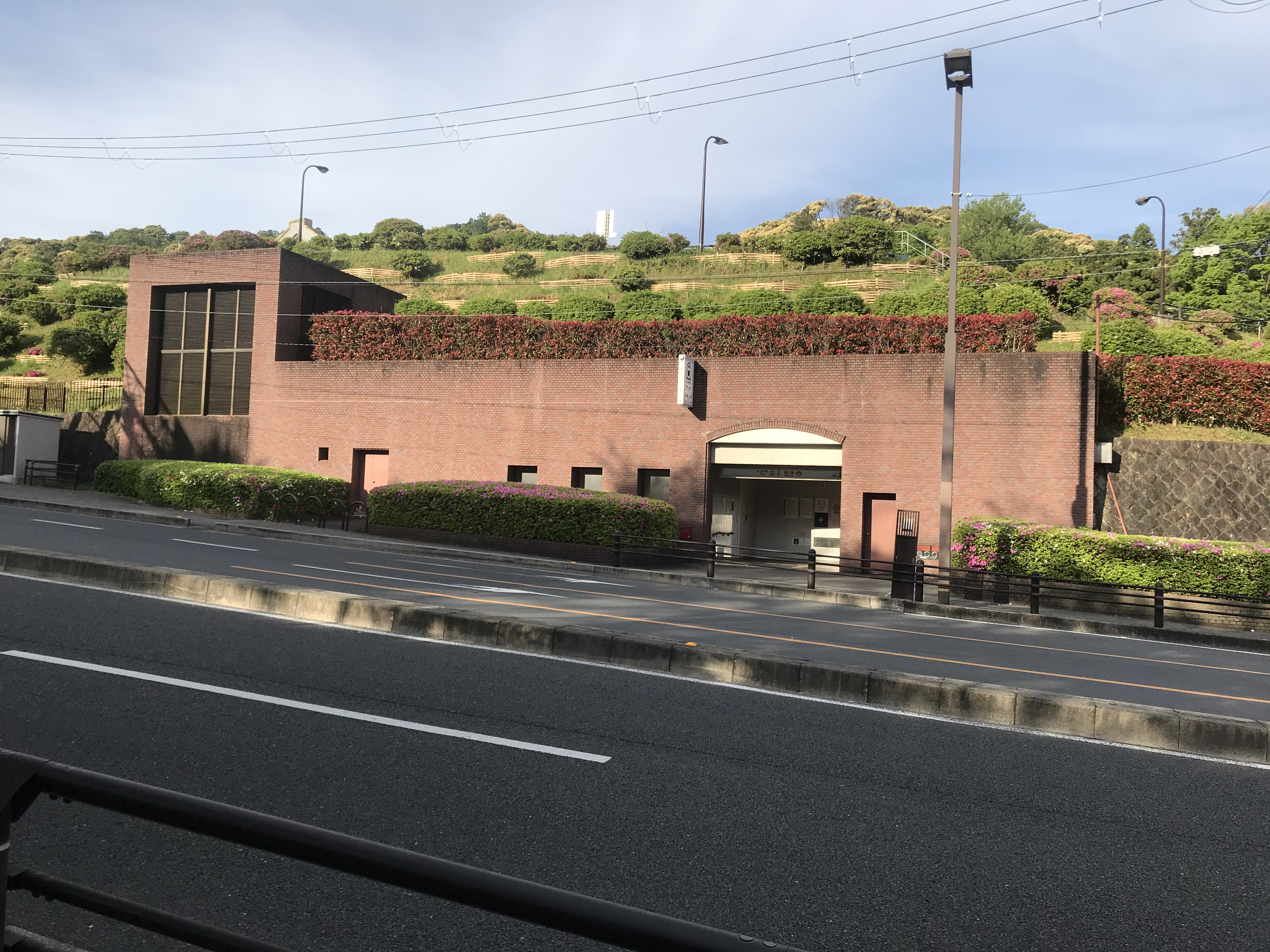
- Keage Station entrance No. 2, May 2020

General information
- Location: Higashiyama, Kyoto, Kyoto; Japan
- Coordinates: 35.0078°N 135.7902°E
- Operator: Kyoto Municipal Subway
- Line: Tōzai Line
- Platforms: 1 island platform
- Tracks: 2

Other information
- Station code: T09

History
- Opened: 12 October 1997; 28 years ago

Passengers
- FY2016: 10,713 daily

Services
Preceding station	Kyoto Municipal Subway	Following station
Higashiyama T10 towards Uzumasa Tenjingawa	Tōzai Line	Misasagi T08 towards Rokujizō
Location

Keage Station (蹴上駅, Keage-eki) is a train station in Higashiyama-ku ward, city of Kyoto, Kyoto Prefecture, Japan. It is the closest subway station to Eikan-dō Zenrin-ji temple.

== Lines ==
- Kyoto Municipal Subway
  - Tōzai Line (Station Number: T09)

== Layout ==
The underground station has one island platform serving two tracks. Track No. 1 is for trains bound for Uzumasa Tenjingawa and Track No. 2 is for trains bound for Rokujizō and Hama-Ōtsu.

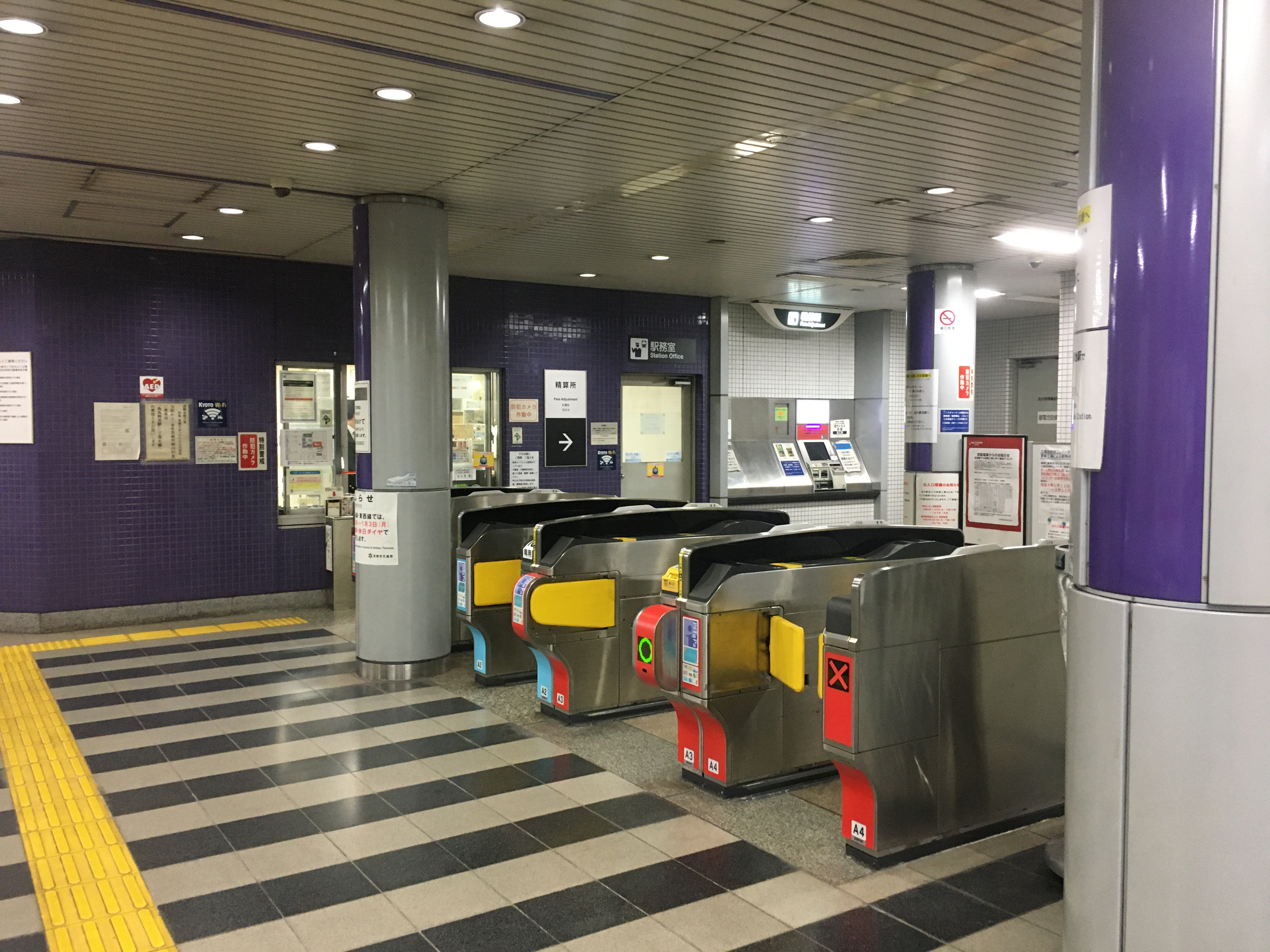
Ticket gates

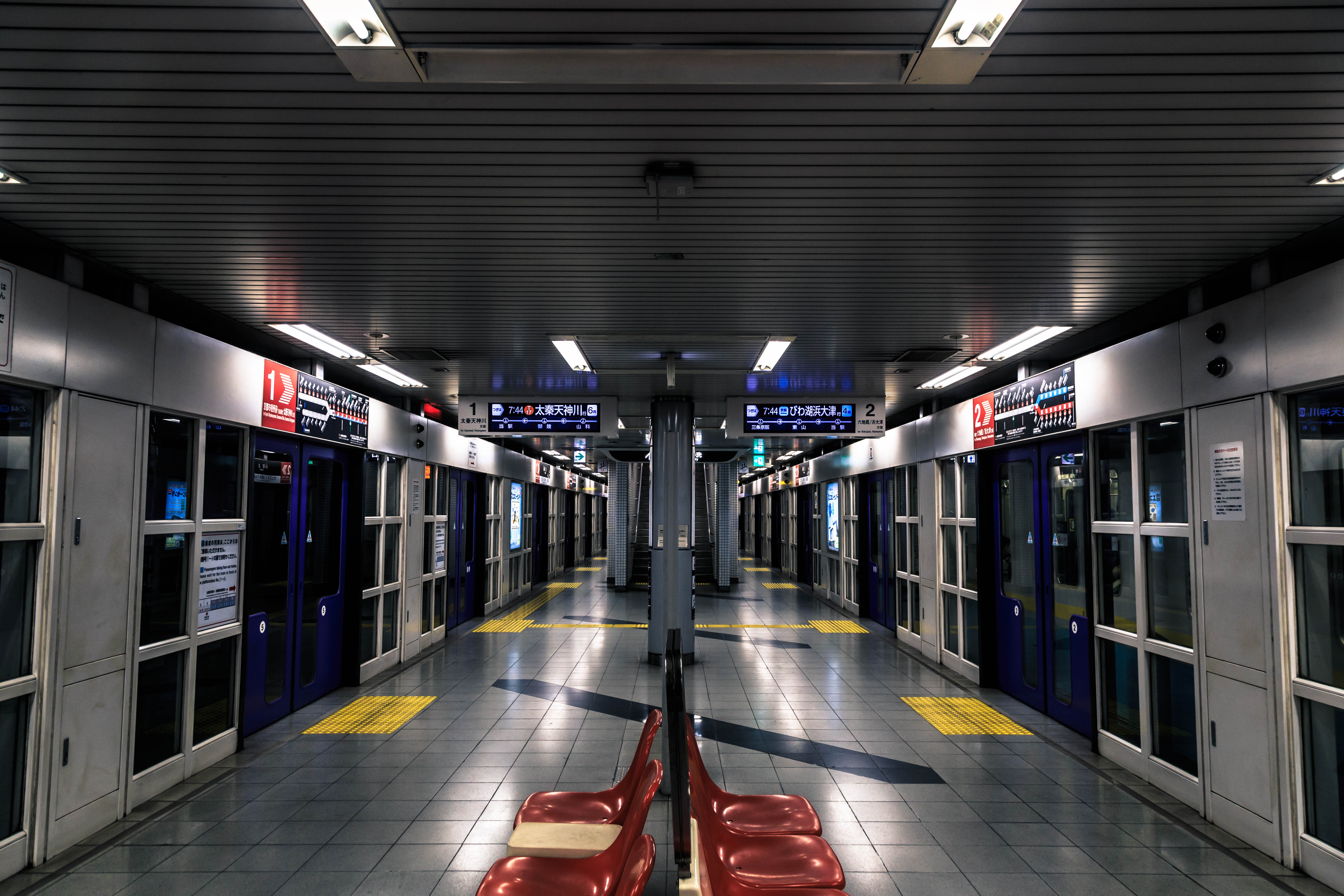
Platform

== History ==
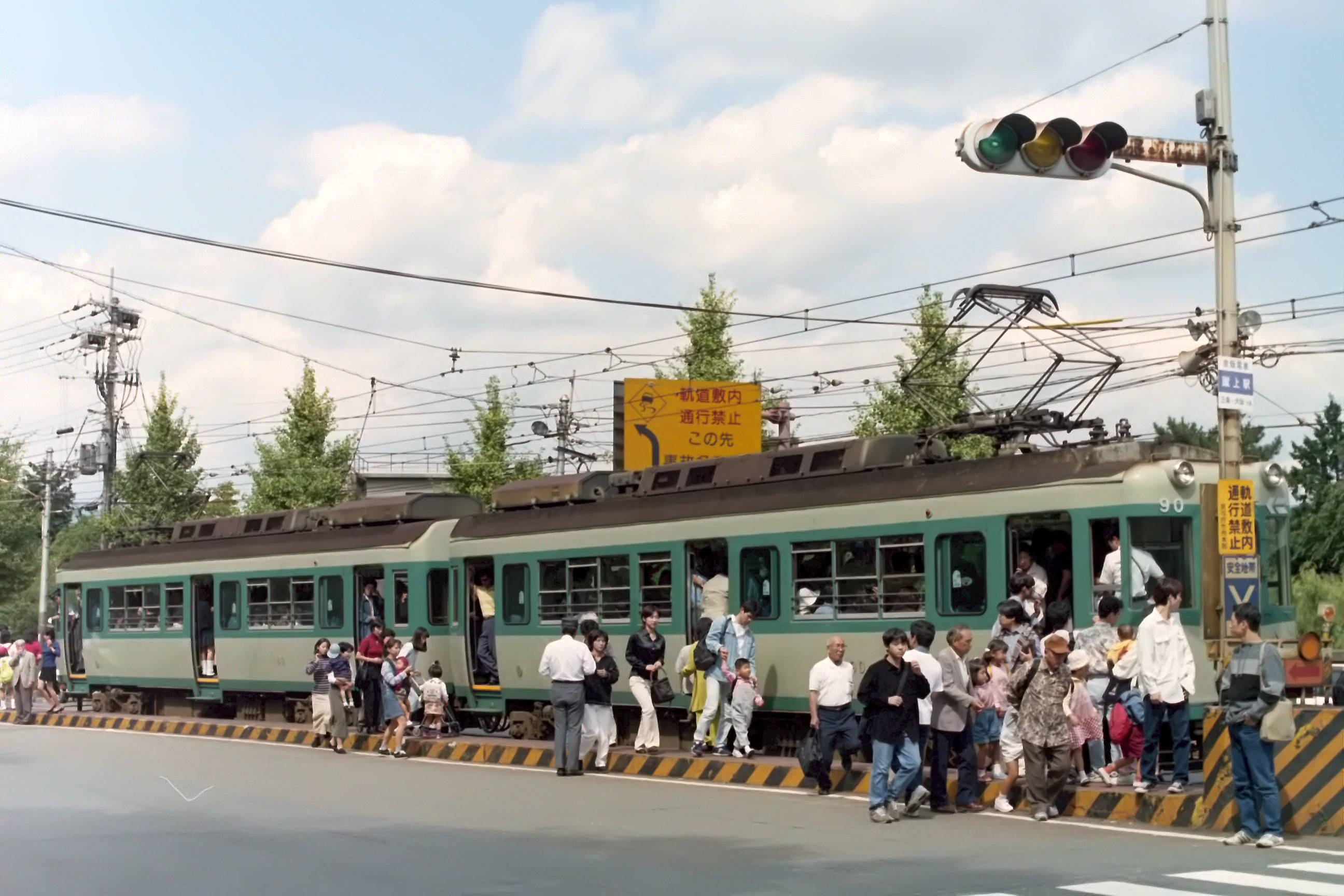
Keage Station of Keishin Line in 1997

The station opened on October 12, 1997 when the first section of the Tōzai Line opened.

Until the day before the opening of the Tōzai Line, Keage Station on the Keihan Keishin Line on the street served the area from the beginning of the Keishin Line on August 15, 1912.

== Surrounding area ==
- Westing Miyako Hotel Kyoto
- Nanzen-ji
- Eikan-dō Zenrin-ji
- Philosopher's Walk (Tetsugaku no Michi)
- Lake Biwa Canal
- Keage Incline
- Kyoto International Community House
- Kyoto City Zoo
- Villa Kujoyama
