= Kyoto Municipal Subway 50 series =

Japanese train type

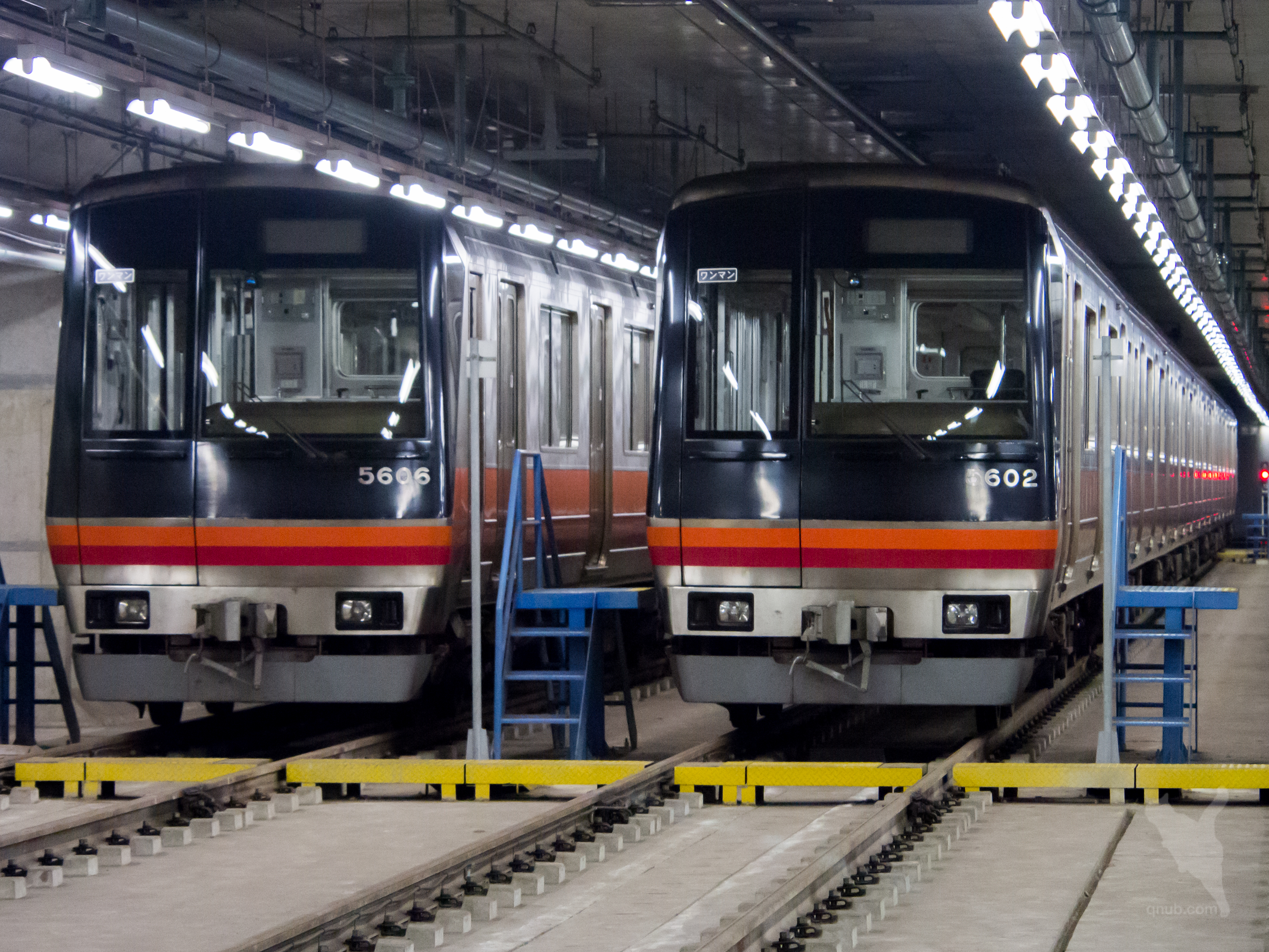
- Two 50 series trains in October 2012
- In service: 1997–
- Manufacturer: Kinki Sharyo
- Constructed: 1997–2004
- Entered service: 10 October 1997
- Number built: 102 vehicles (17 sets)
- Number in service: 102 vehicles (17 sets)
- Formation: 6 cars per trainset
- Fleet numbers: 5x01–5x17
- Capacity: 92 (end cars); 104 (intermediate cars)
- Operators: Kyoto Municipal Subway
- Depots: Daigo
- Lines served: Tozai Line

Specifications
- Car body construction: Stainless Steel
- Car length: 16,500 mm (54 ft 1 5/8 in)
- Width: 2,489 mm (8 ft 2 in)
- Height: 3,476 mm (11 ft 4 7/8 in)
- Floor height: 900 mm (2 ft 11 in)
- Doors: 3 pairs per side
- Maximum speed: 75 km/h (47 mph)
- Traction system: VVVF
- Power output: 16 × 85 kW (114 hp)
- Acceleration: 2.3 km/(h⋅s) (1.4 mph/s)
- Deceleration: 3.5 km/(h⋅s) (2.2 mph/s) (operation); 4.0 km/(h⋅s) (2.5 mph/s) (emergency)
- Electric system(s): 1,500 V DC overhead wire
- Current collection: Scissors-type pantograph
- UIC classification: 2′2′+Bo′Bo′+Bo′Bo′+Bo′Bo′+Bo′Bo′+2′2′
- Safety system(s): ATC, ATO
- Track gauge: 1,435 mm (4 ft 8 1/2 in) standard gauge

The Kyoto Municipal Subway 50 series (京都市営地下鉄50系, Kyōto-shiei chikatetsu 50-kei) is an electric multiple unit (EMU) commuter train type operated by the Kyoto Municipal Subway in Kyoto, Japan, since 1997.

== Overview ==
The 50 series was introduced in 1997 with 14 6-car sets built by the end of 1997 to coincide with the opening of the Tōzai Line. The remaining 18 cars (3 sets) would be built in 2004 for the opening of an extension from Rokujizō Station to Daigo Station.

The trains are smaller than most other trains in the country because of the smaller tunnels carved out during construction.

== Interior ==
Passenger accommodation consists of longitudinal bench seating throughout. Priority seating and wheelchair space is provided on all vehicles.

== Formations ==
The six-car trains are formed as follows, with four motored ("M") cars and two non-powered trailer cab ("Tc") cars.

Car	1	2	3	4	5	6
Designation	Tc1	M1	M2	M1'	M2'	Tc2
Numbering	51xx	52xx	53xx	54xx	55xx	56xx

- The "M1" and "M1'" cars are equipped with two pantographs.

== Gallery ==
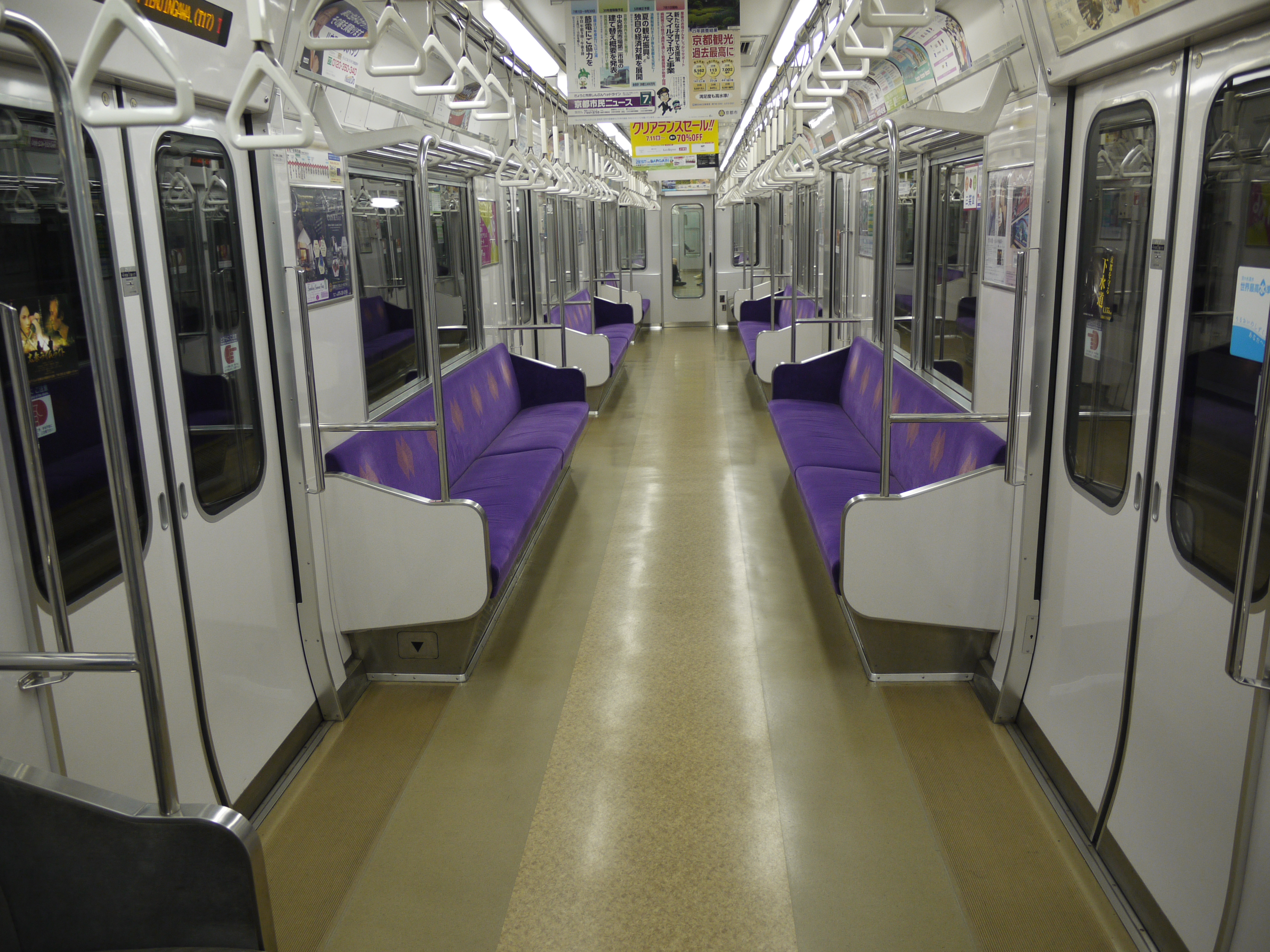
Interior of the subway car

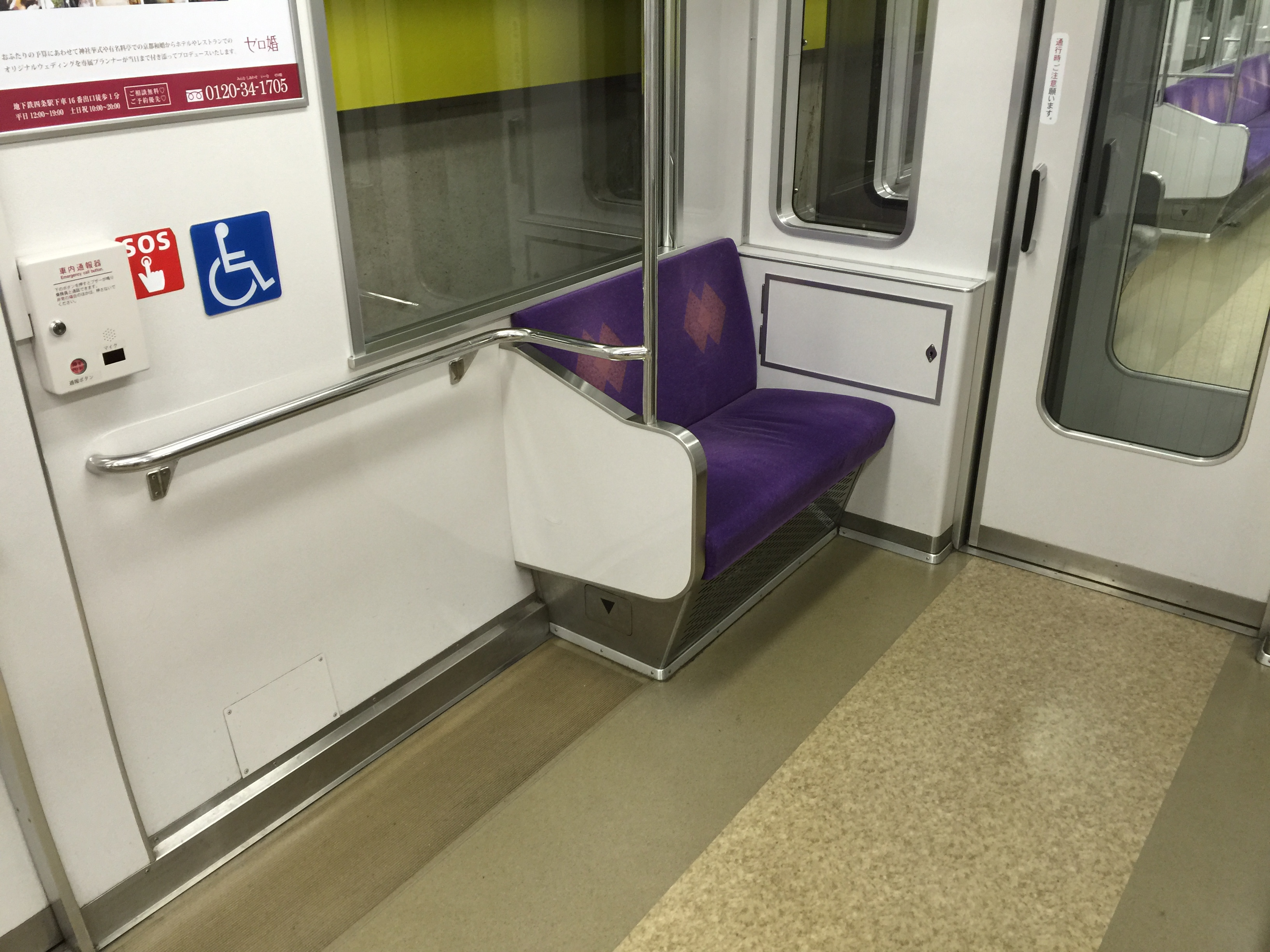
View of the wheelchair space

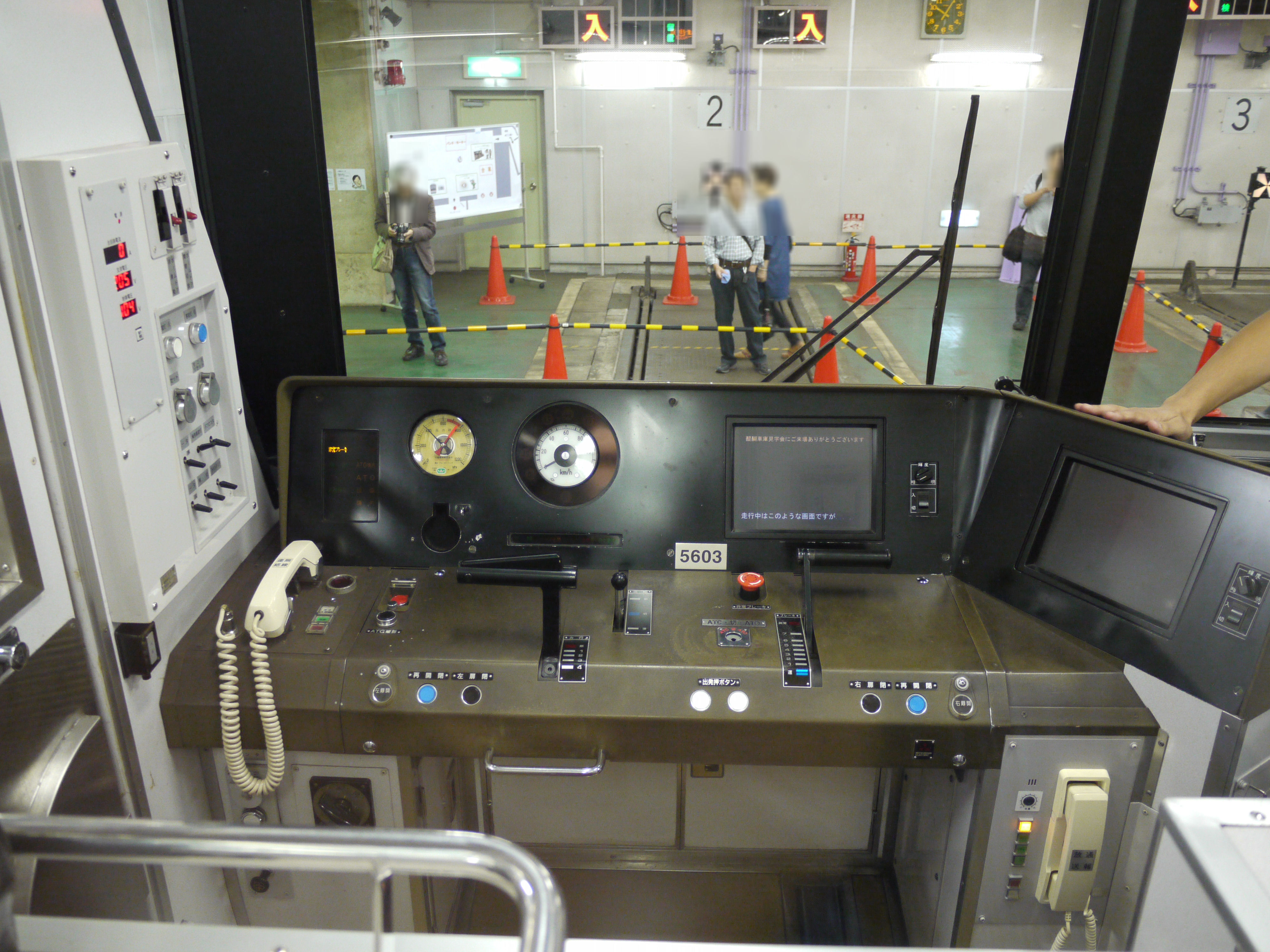
Driver cabin of 5603

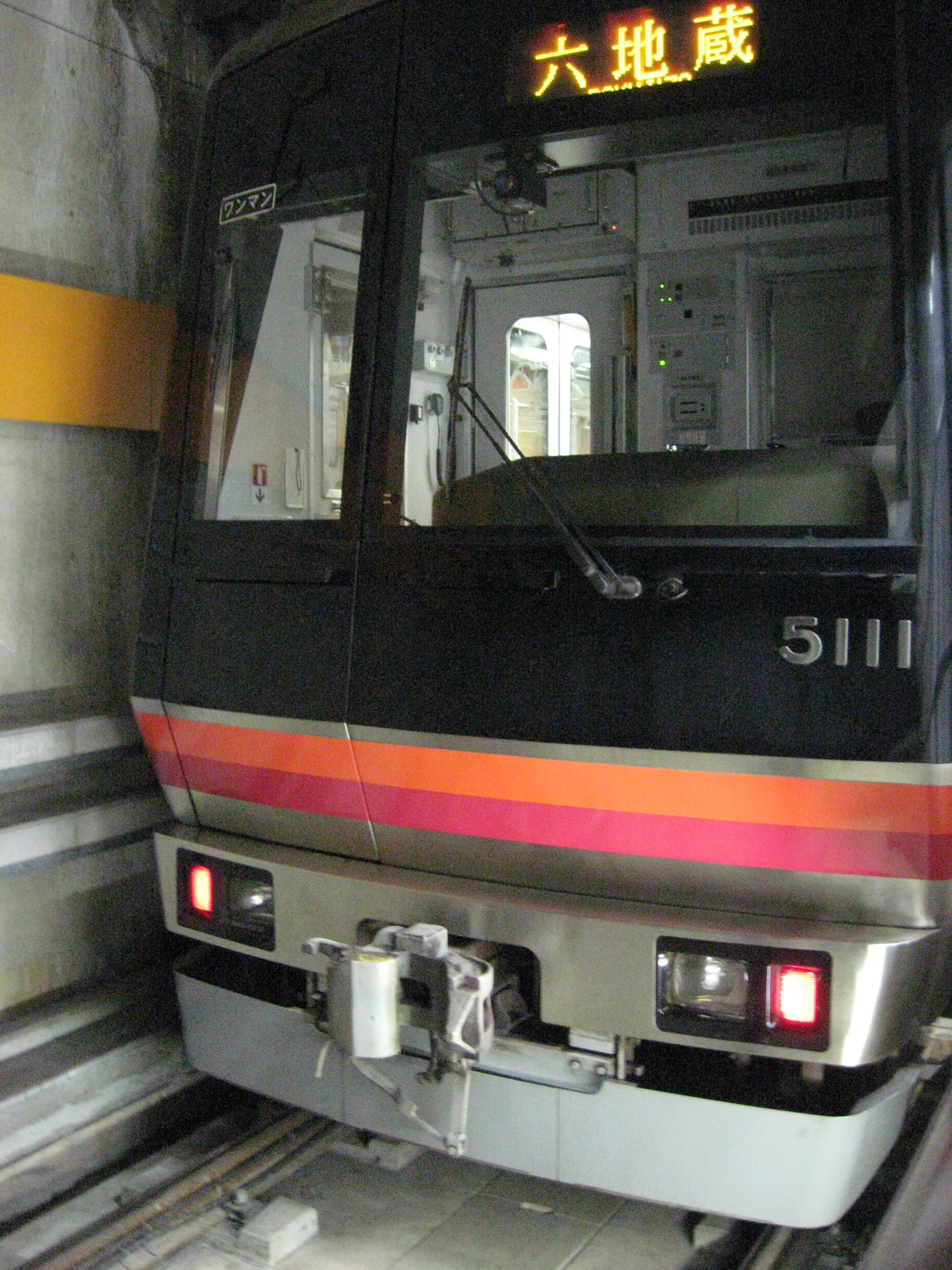
Front of 5111

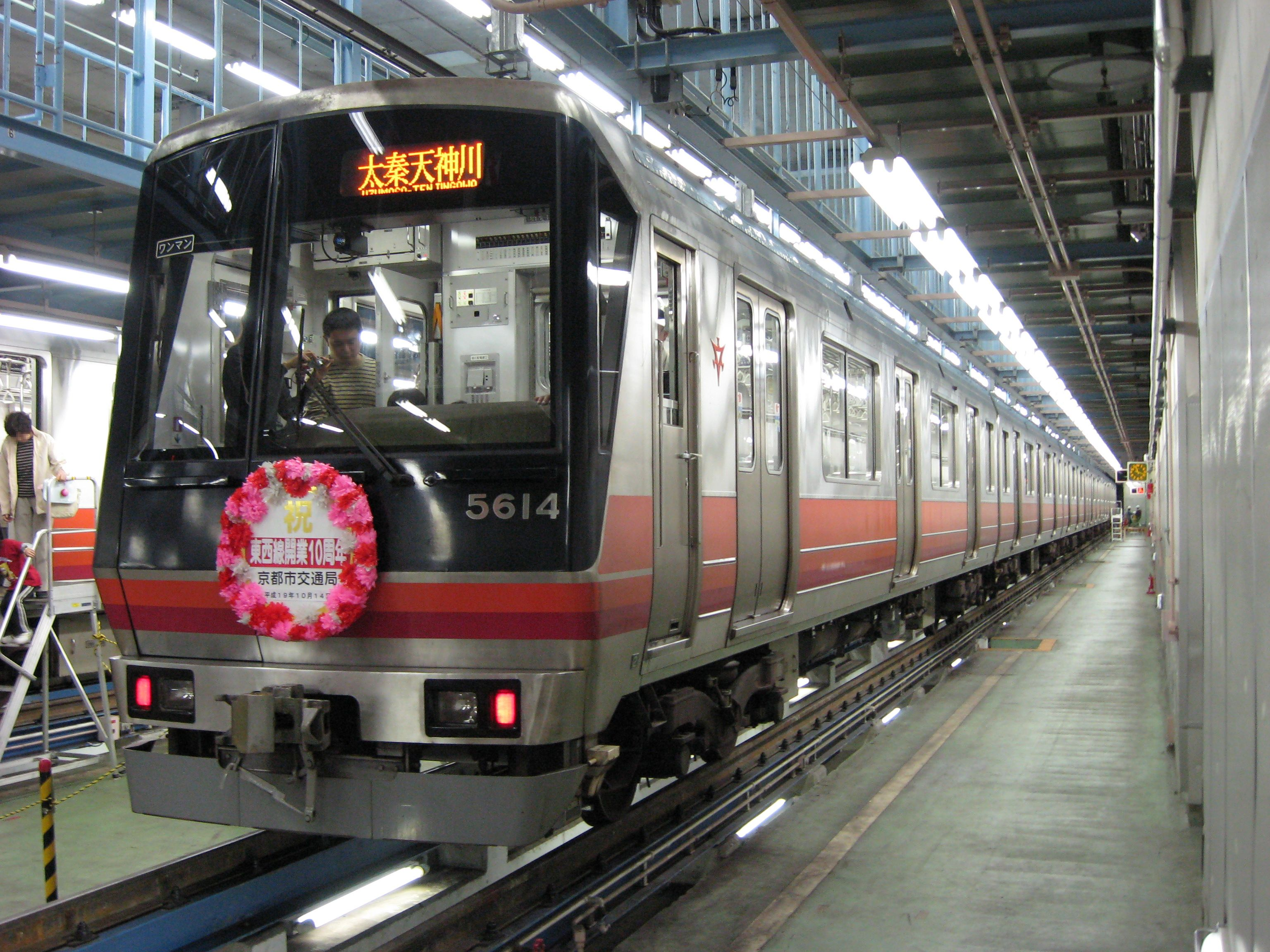
5614 at an open house event
