= Daigo Station (Kyoto) =

Metro station in Kyoto, Japan

T03 Daigo Station 醍醐駅
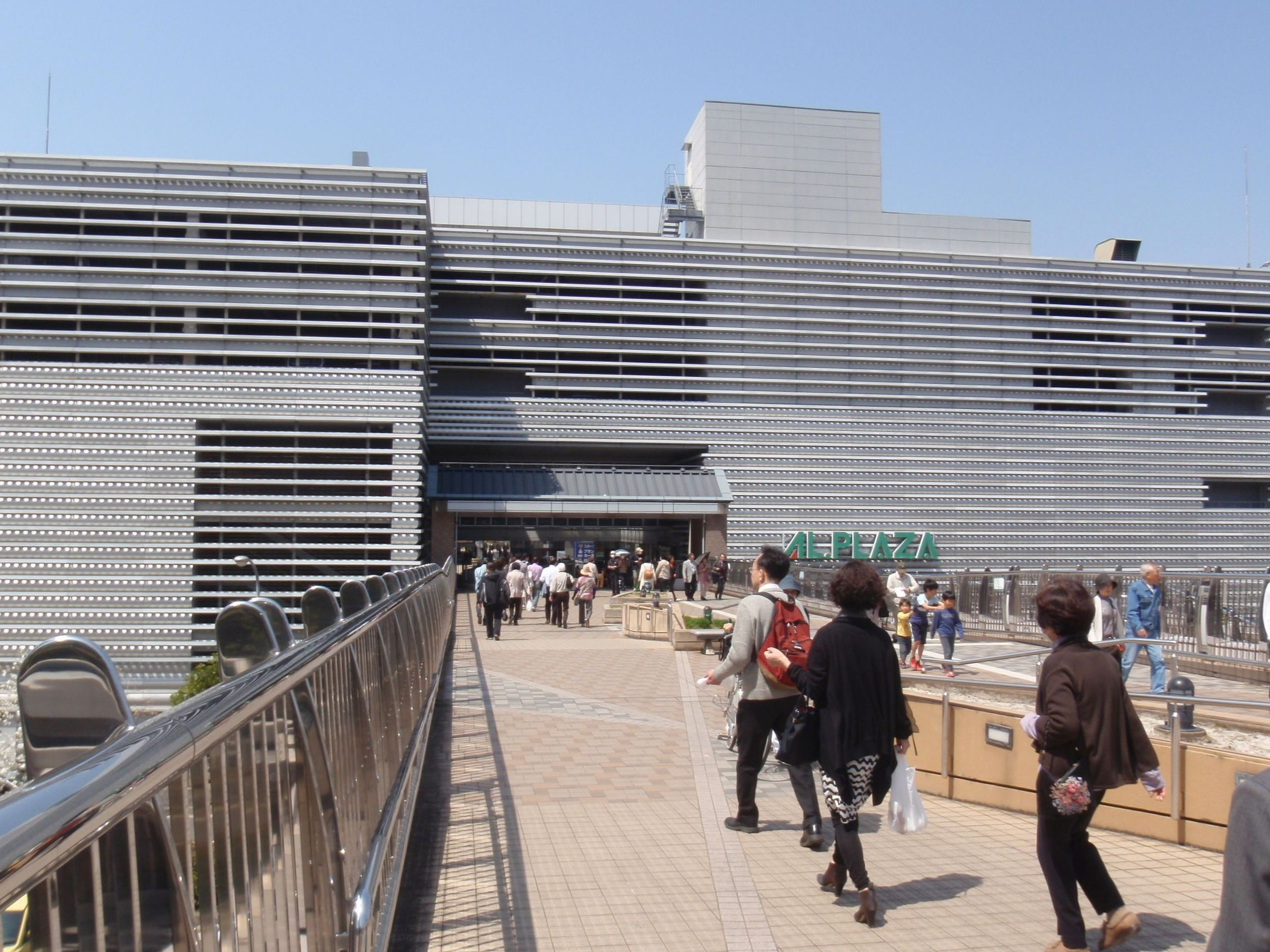

General information
- Coordinates: 34°57′03″N 135°48′38″E
- Operator: Kyoto Municipal Subway
- Line: Tōzai Line
- Platforms: 1 island platform
- Tracks: 2

Other information
- Station code: T03

History
- Opened: 12 October 1997; 29 years ago

Passengers
- FY2016: 12,295 daily

Services
Preceding station	Kyoto Municipal Subway	Following station
Ono T04 towards Uzumasa Tenjingawa	Tōzai Line	Ishida T02 towards Rokujizō
Location

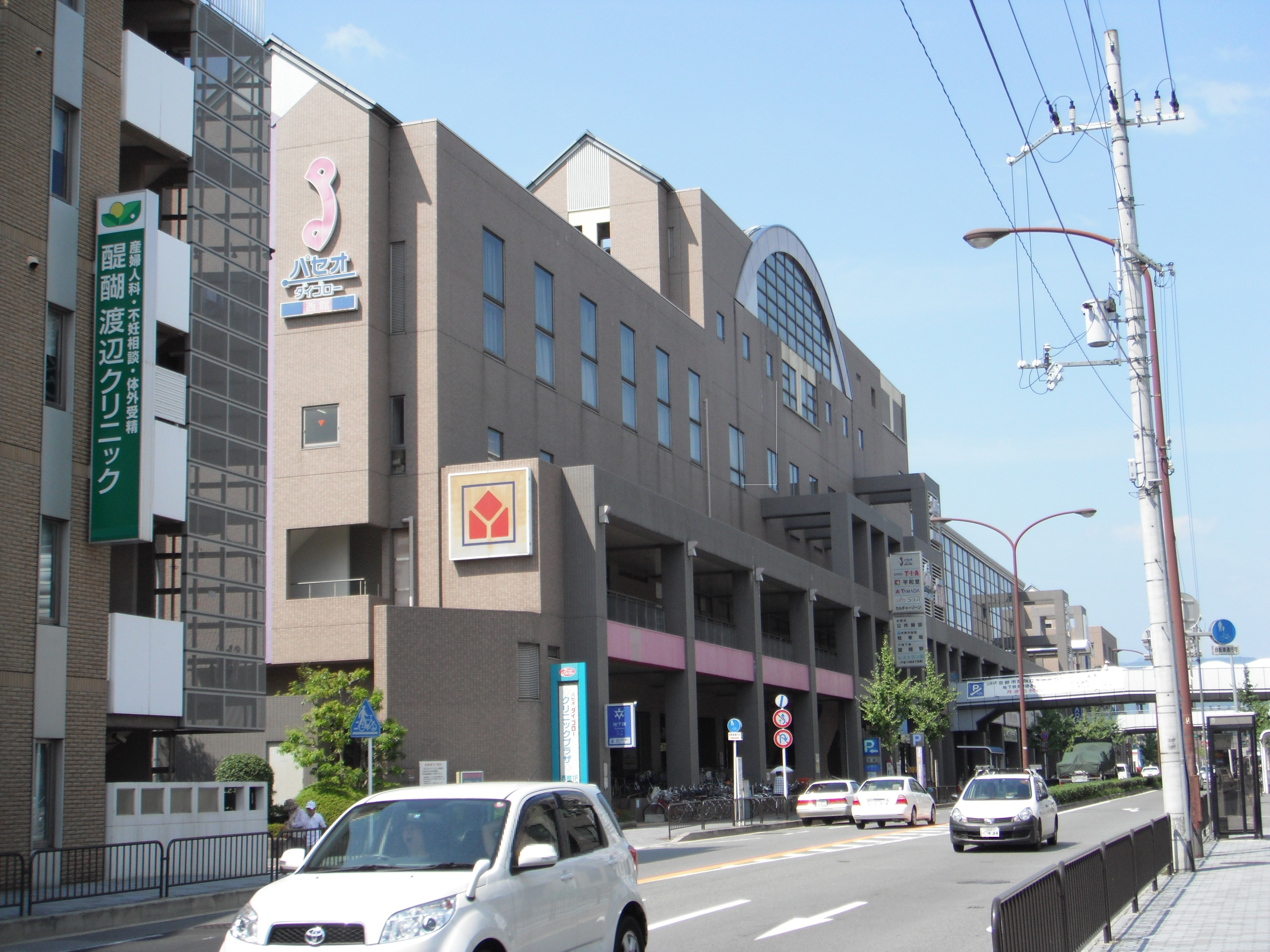
Building above the station

Daigo Station (醍醐駅, Daigo-eki) is a train station on the Kyoto Municipal Subway Tōzai Line in Fushimi-ku, Kyoto, Japan.

== Lines ==
- Kyoto Municipal Subway
  - Tōzai Line (Station Number: T03)

== Layout ==
The subway station has an island platform serving two tracks separated by platform screen doors.

1	■ Tōzai Line	for Misasagi, Karasuma Oike and Uzumasa Tenjingawa
2	■ Tōzai Line	for Rokujizō

== History ==
The station opened on 12 October 1997, when the initial section of the Tōzai Line between Nijō and Daigo began service. On 26 November 2004, the line was extended southeast from Daigo to Rokujizō, and Daigo ceased to be the terminus.

== Surrounding area ==
- Daigo-ji (醍醐寺), a major Shingon Buddhist temple and one of the component parts of the UNESCO World Heritage Site "Historic Monuments of Ancient Kyoto".
- Paseo Daigoro (パセオ・ダイゴロー), a mixed-use complex directly connected to the station that includes public facilities and retail.
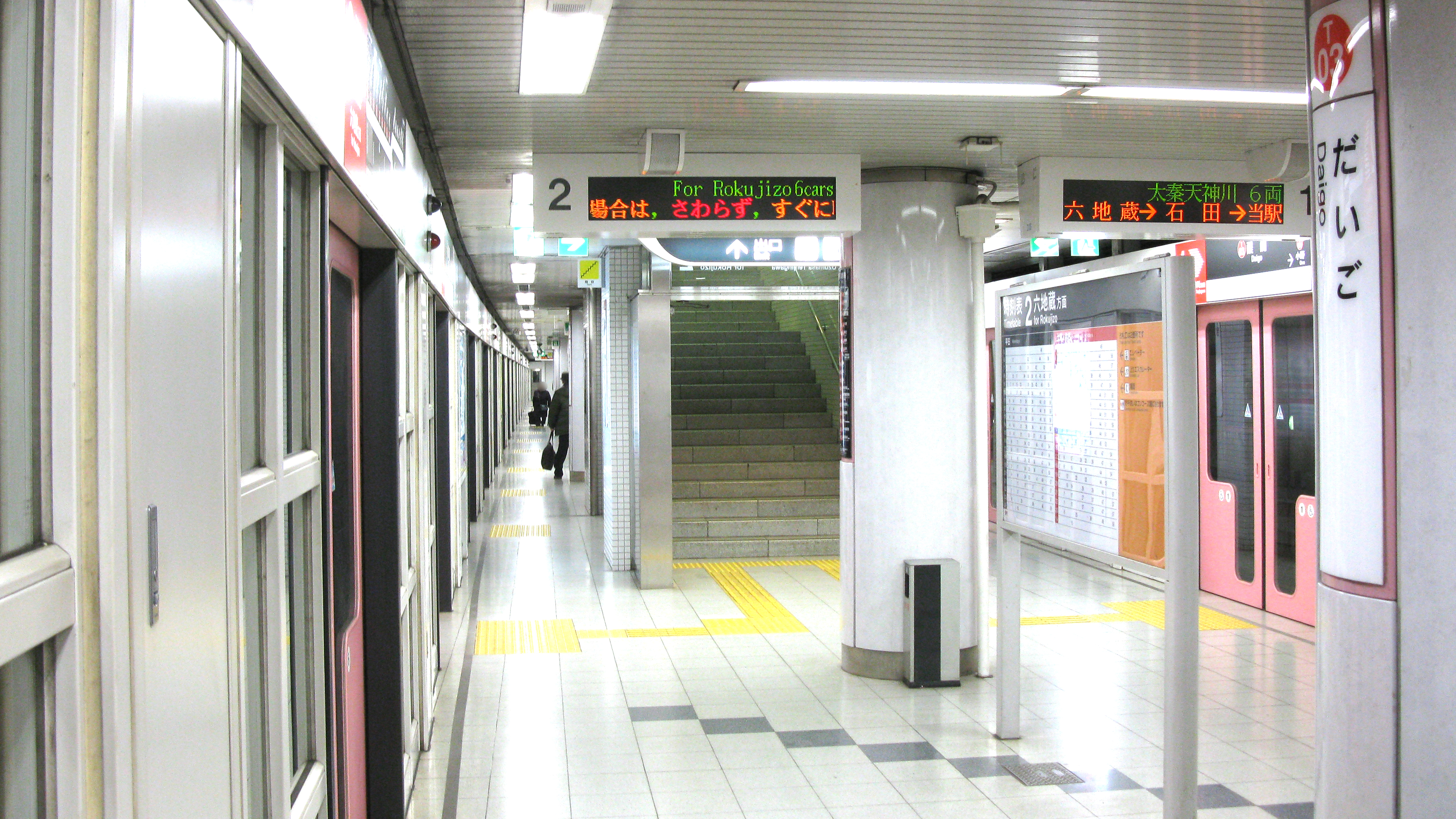
Platform
