= Nishiōji Oike Station =

Metro station in Kyoto, Japan

T16 Nishiōji-Oike Station 西大路御池駅
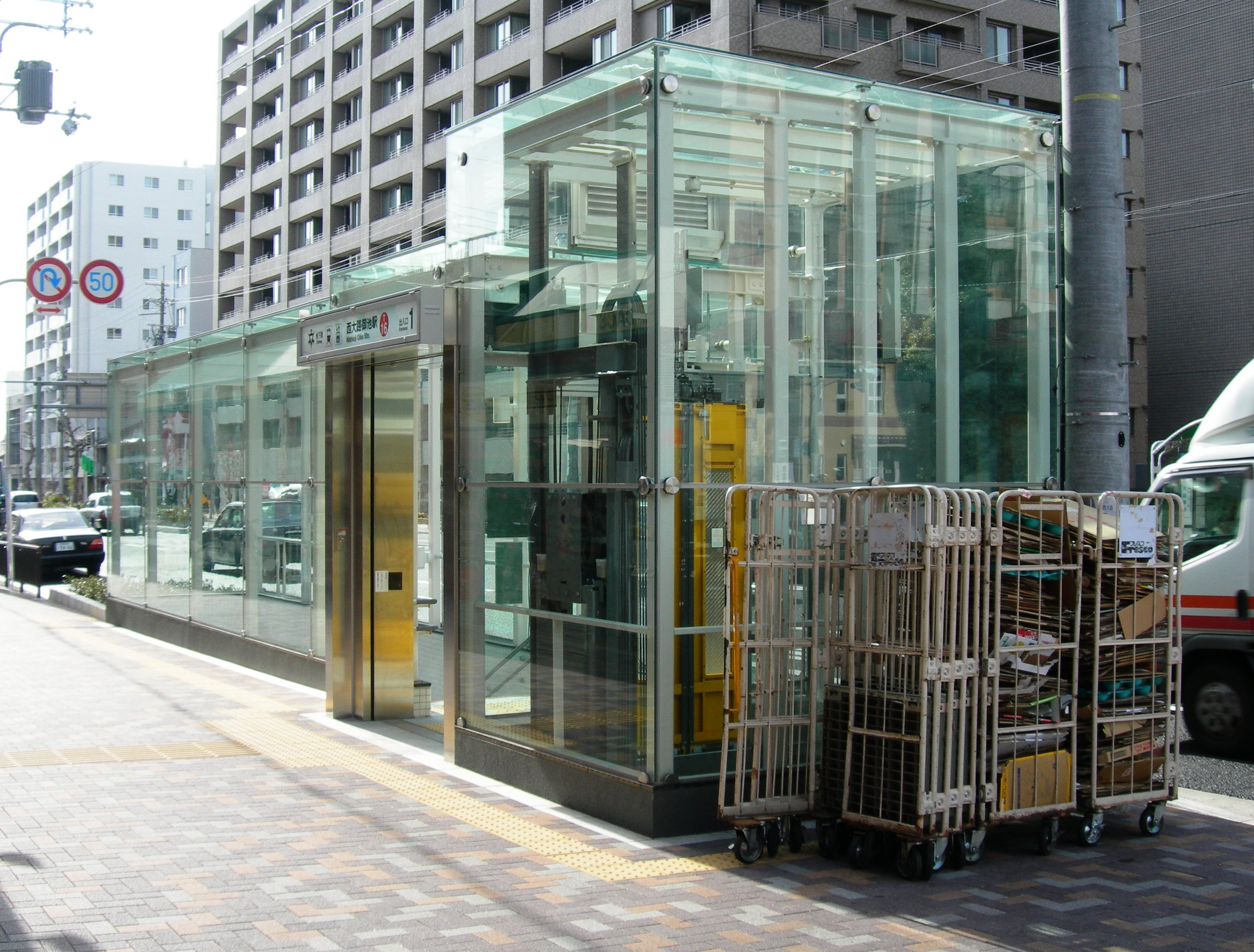
- Nishiōji-Oike Station (No. 1 exit), January 2008

General information
- Location: Nakagyō, Kyoto, Kyoto; Japan
- Coordinates: 35.0110°N 135.7311°E
- Operator: Kyoto Municipal Subway
- Line: Tōzai Line
- Platforms: 1 island platform
- Tracks: 2

Construction
- Structure type: Underground

Other information
- Station code: T16

History
- Opened: 16 January 2008; 18 years ago

Passengers
- FY2016: 11,920 daily

Services
| Preceding station | Kyoto Municipal Subway | Following station |
|---|---|---|
| Uzumasa Tenjingawa T17 Terminus | Tōzai Line | Nijō T15 towards Rokujizō |
Location

Nishiōji-Oike Station (西大路御池駅, Nishiōji Oike-eki; T16) is a train station on the Kyoto Municipal Subway Tōzai Line in Nakagyō-ku ward, city of Kyoto, Kyoto Prefecture, Japan.

== Layout ==
The underground station has an island platform with two tracks.

| 1 | ■ Tōzai Line | for Uzumasa Tenjingawa |
| 2 | ■ Tōzai Line | for Rokujizō and Hamaotsu |

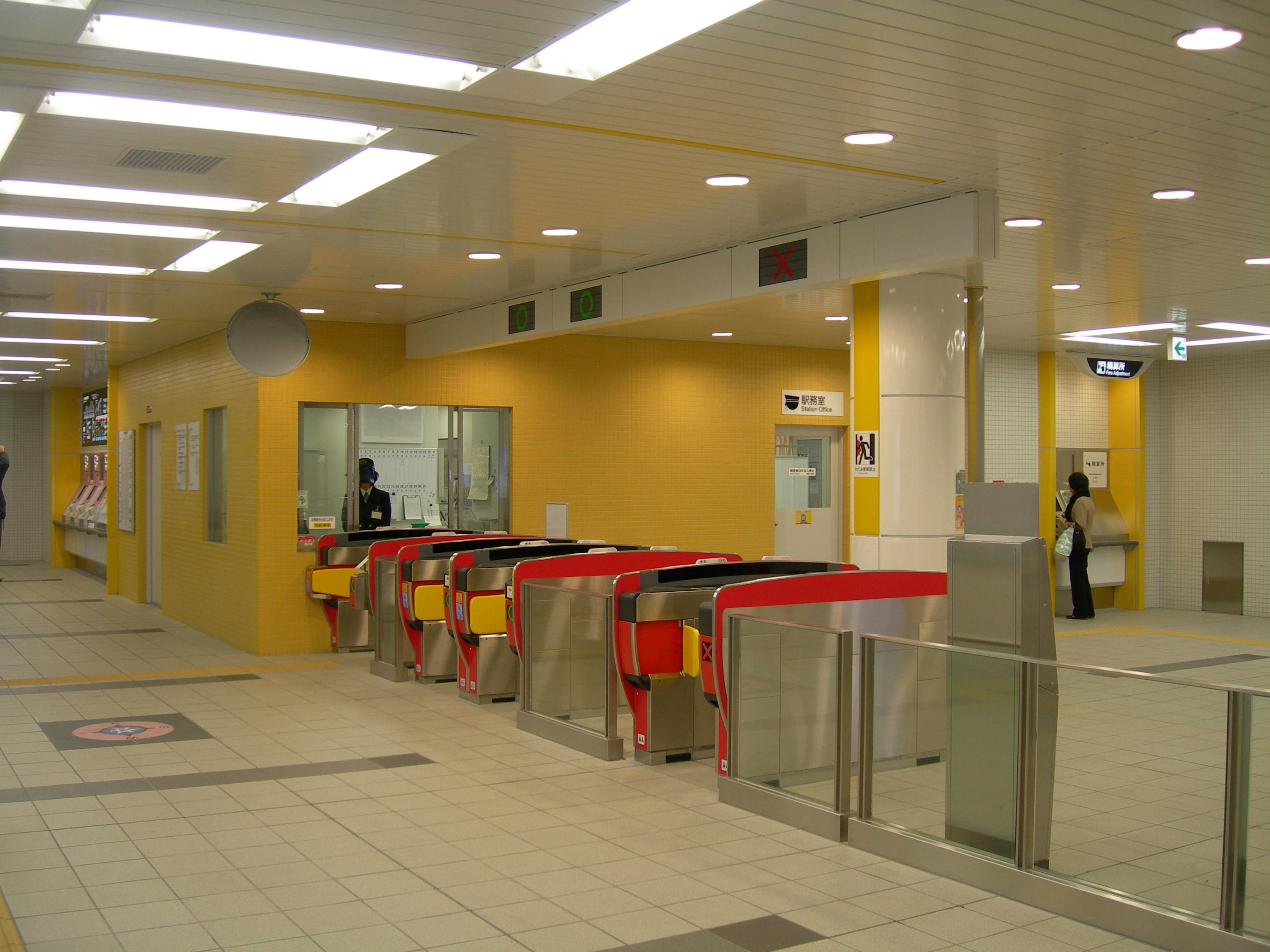
Ticket gates

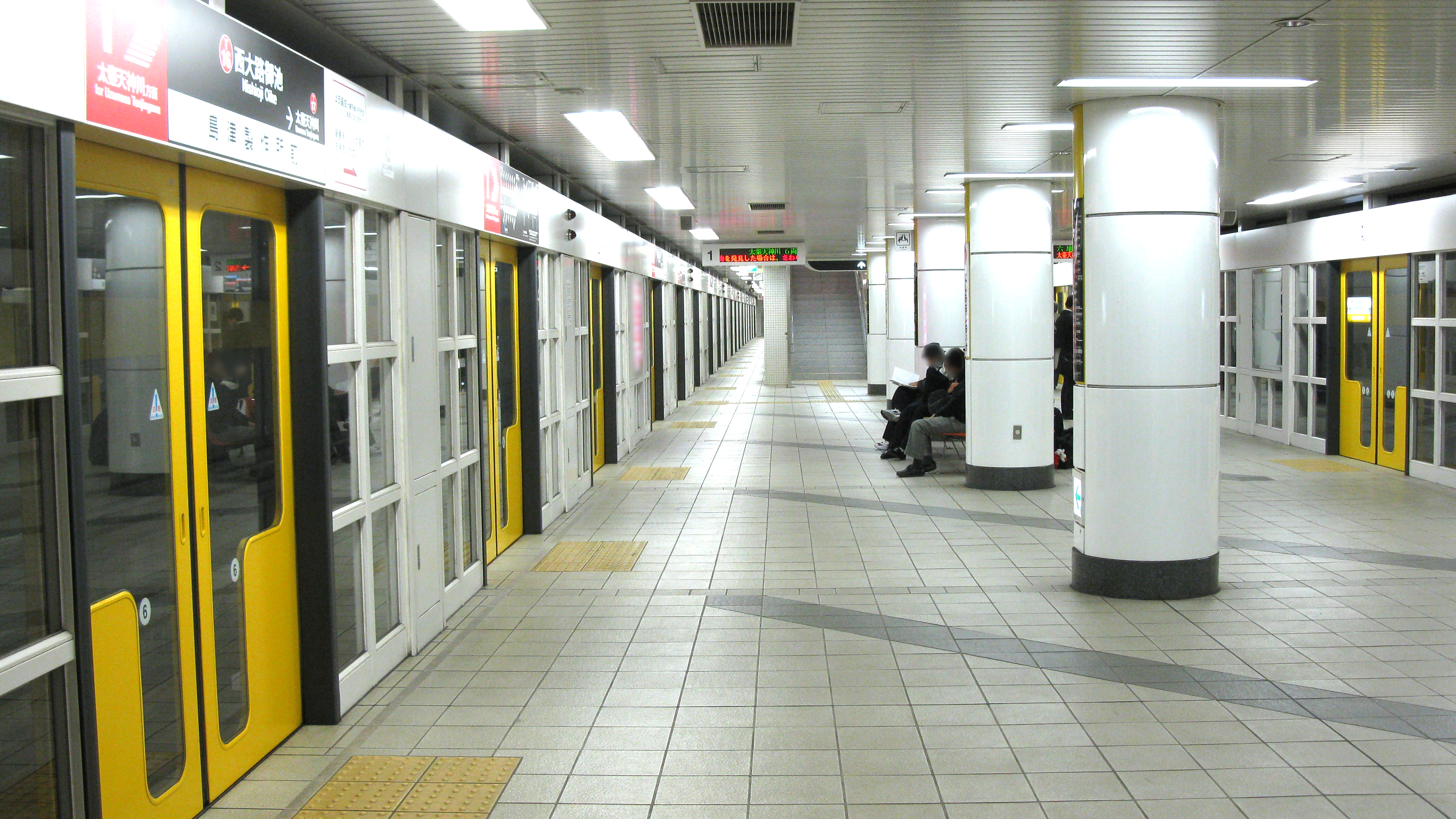
Platform

== History ==
- January 16, 2008 – Station begins operation as the Tōzai Line extension from Nijō to Uzumasa Tenjingawa completed.
