= Uzumasa Tenjingawa Station =

Metro station in Kyoto, Japan

T17 Uzumasa Tenjingawa Station 太秦天神川駅
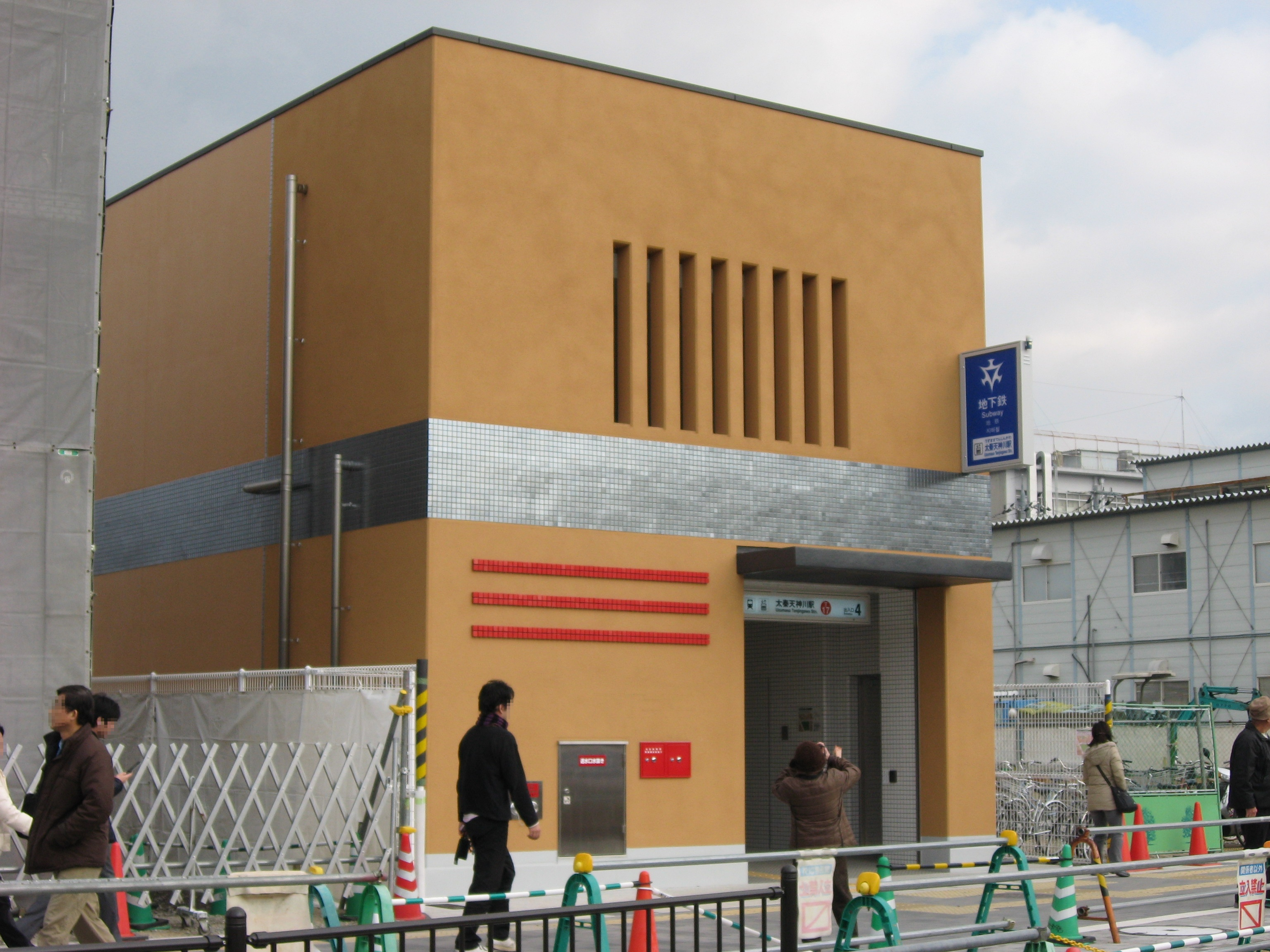
- Uzumasa Tenjingawa Station (No.4 exit), January 2008

General information
- Location: Ukyō, Kyoto, Kyoto; Japan
- Coordinates: 35°0′39″N 135°42′56″E
- Operator: Kyoto Municipal Subway
- Line: Tōzai Line
- Platforms: 1 island platform
- Tracks: 2
- Connections: Randen Arashiyama Line (A5: Randen-Tenjingawa Station)

Construction
- Structure type: Underground

Other information
- Station code: T17

History
- Opened: 16 January 2008; 18 years ago

Passengers
- FY 2024: 17,708 daily

Services
Preceding station	Kyoto Municipal Subway	Following station
Terminus	Tōzai Line	Nishiōji Oike T16 towards Rokujizō
Location

Uzumasa Tenjingawa Station (太秦天神川駅, Uzumasa Tenjingawa-eki) is a train station on the Kyoto Municipal Subway Tōzai Line, in Ukyō-ku ward, city of Kyoto, Kyoto Prefecture, Japan.

== Lines ==
- Kyoto Municipal Subway
  - Tōzai Line (Station Number: T17)

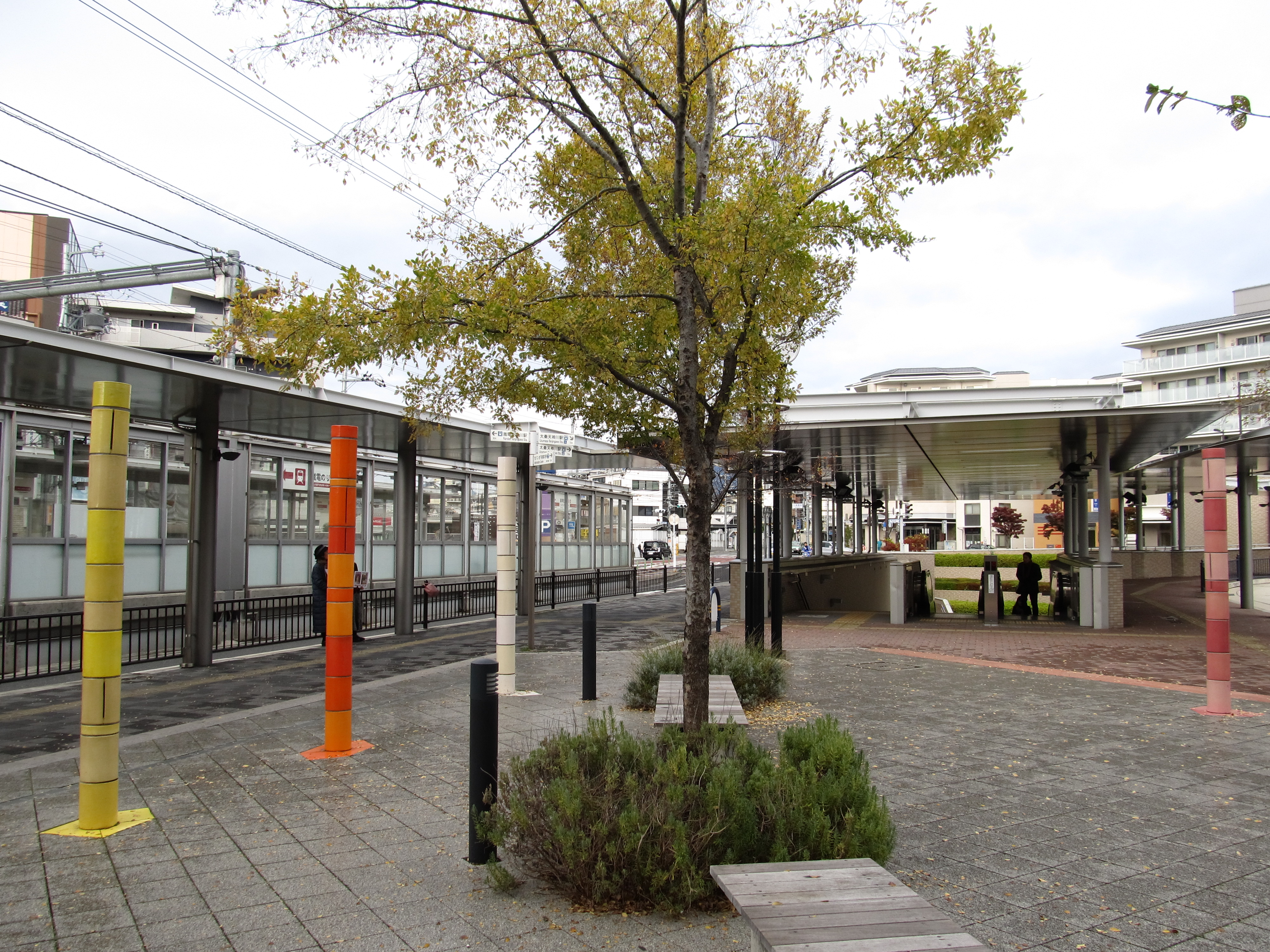
Randen Tenjingawa Station on Keifuku Electric Railway Arashiyama Main Line (left) and Uzumasa Tenjingawa Station on Kyoto City Subway Tozai Line (right)

Randen-Tenjingawa Station on the Arashiyama Main Line (Randen) of Keifuku Electric Railroad is located just above the station. Before the opening of Randen Tenjingawa Station on March 28, 2008, Kaikonoyashiro Station was the nearest Randen station.

== Layout ==
The underground station has an island platform with two tracks.

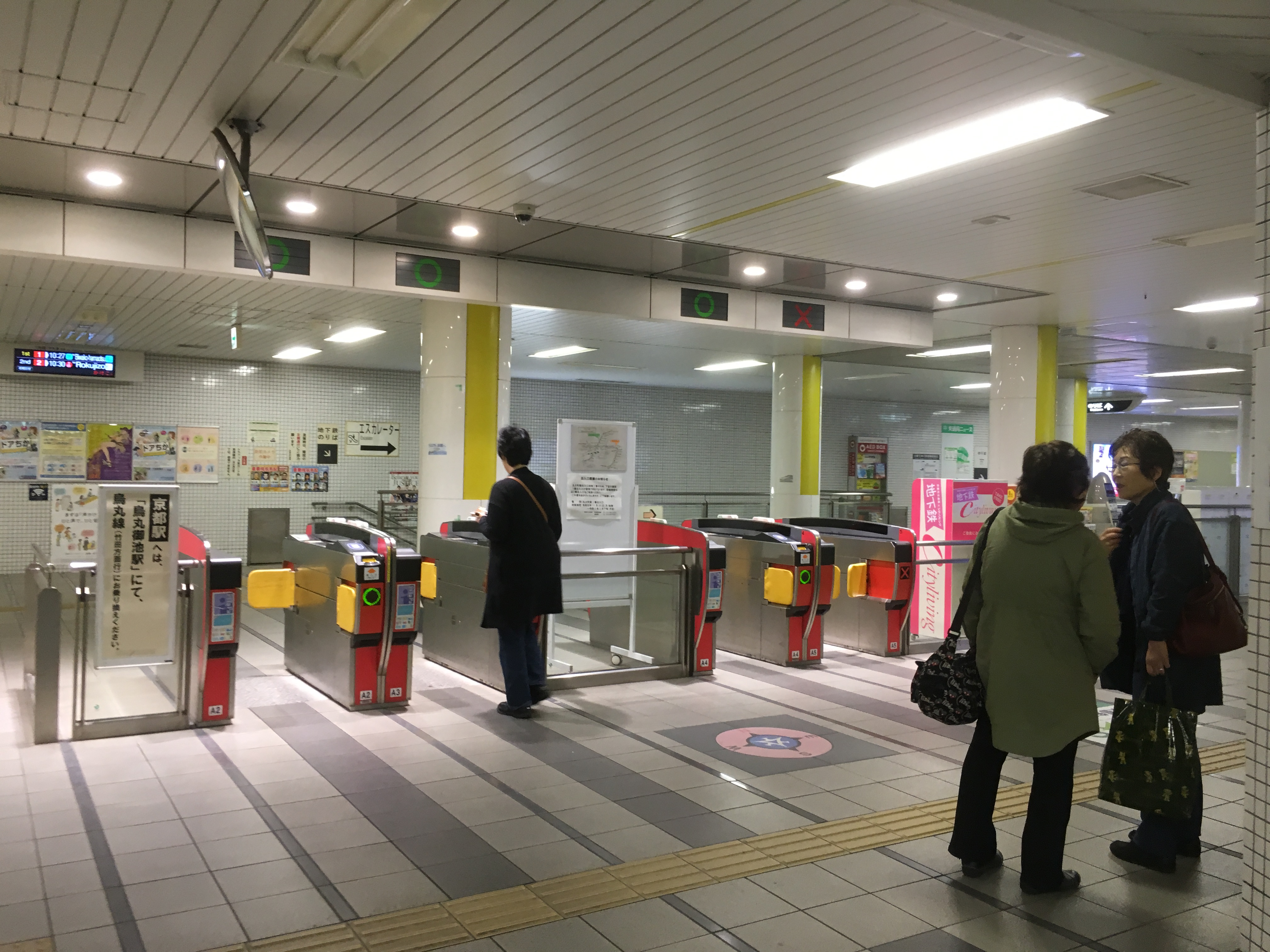
Ticket gates

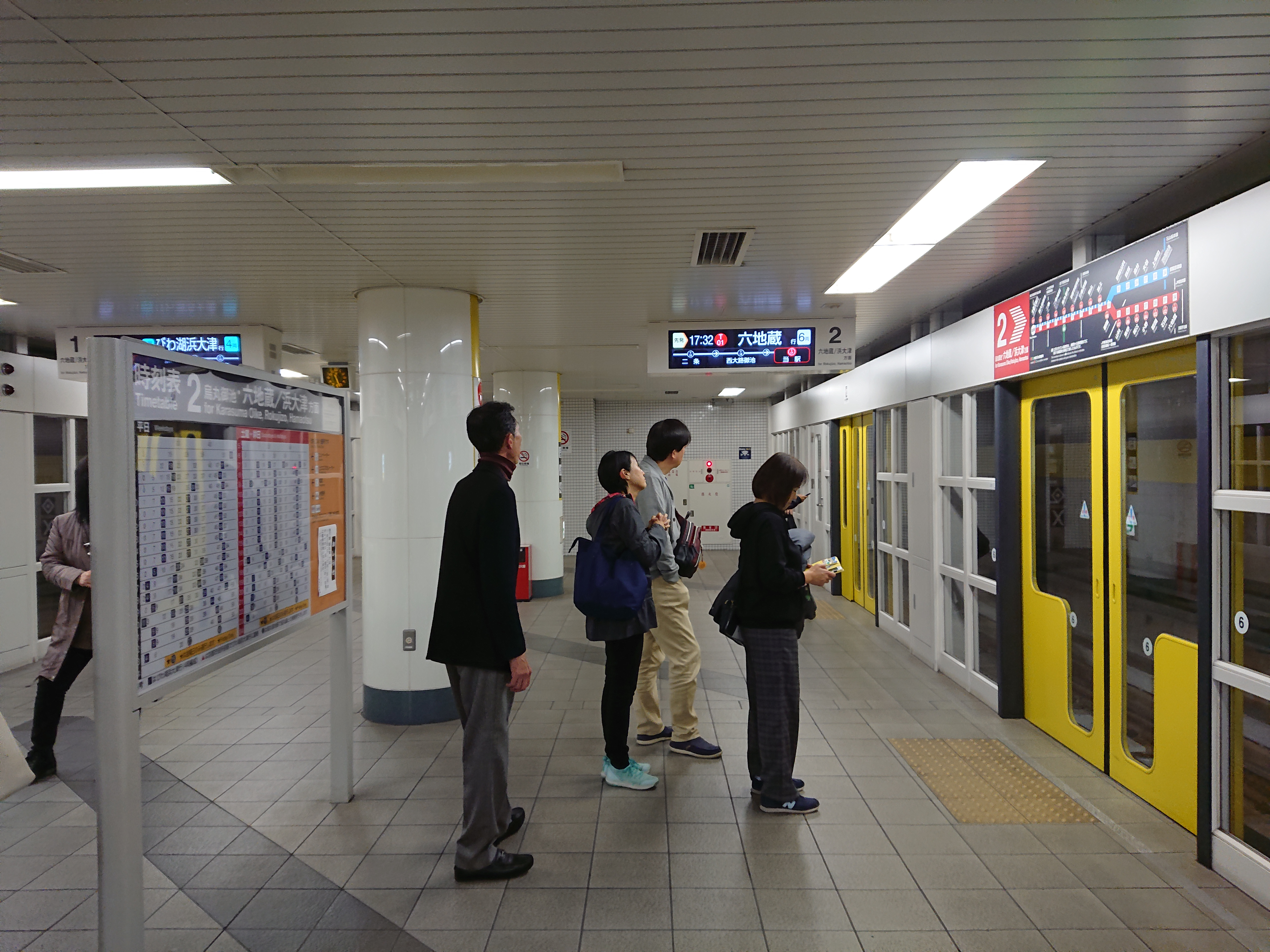
Platform

== History ==
- January 16, 2008 – Station begins operation as the Tōzai Line extension from Nijō to this station completed
