= Nishi-Kyōgoku Stadium =

Nishi-Kyōgoku Stadium is a name used to refer to several stadiums in Nishi-Kyōgoku Athletic Park in Kyoto, Japan. Specifically, it may refer to:

- Takebishi Stadium Kyoto, a 20,588 seat multi-purpose stadium used primarily for football previously known as Nishi-Kyōgoku Athletic Stadium
- Wakasa Stadium Kyoto, a 20,000 seat baseball park formerly called Nishi-Kyōgoku Stadium which served as the home field of the Shochiku Robins

== See also ==
- Nishi-Kyōgoku Station, a train station near the stadiums
