= Kyoto Municipal Transportation Bureau =

Government agency in Kyoto, Japan

Kyoto Municipal Transportation Bureau 京都市交通局

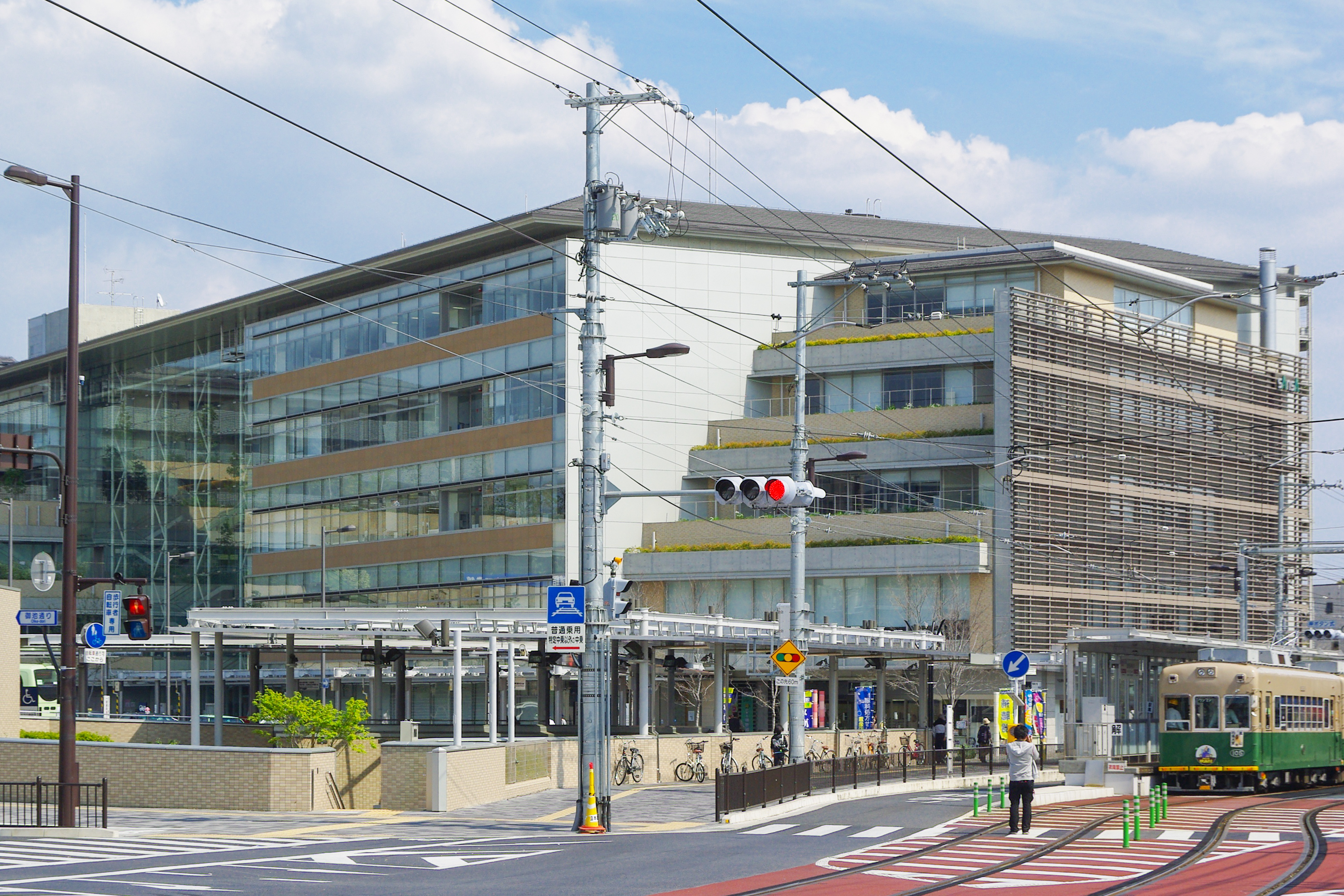
- Kyoto Municipal Transportation Bureau headquarters
- Native name: 京都市交通局
- Romanized name: Kyōto-shi Kōtsū-kyoku
- Company type: Transportation authority
- Industry: Transportation
- Founded: 11 June 1912
- Headquarters: Ukyō-ku, Kyoto, Japan
- Website: Official website

Kyoto Municipal Transportation Bureau (京都市交通局, Kyōto-shi Kōtsū-kyoku) is an agency of the city government of Kyoto, Japan that operates municipal subways and city buses within the city. Previously, it also operated trams and trolley buses.

== Subway ==
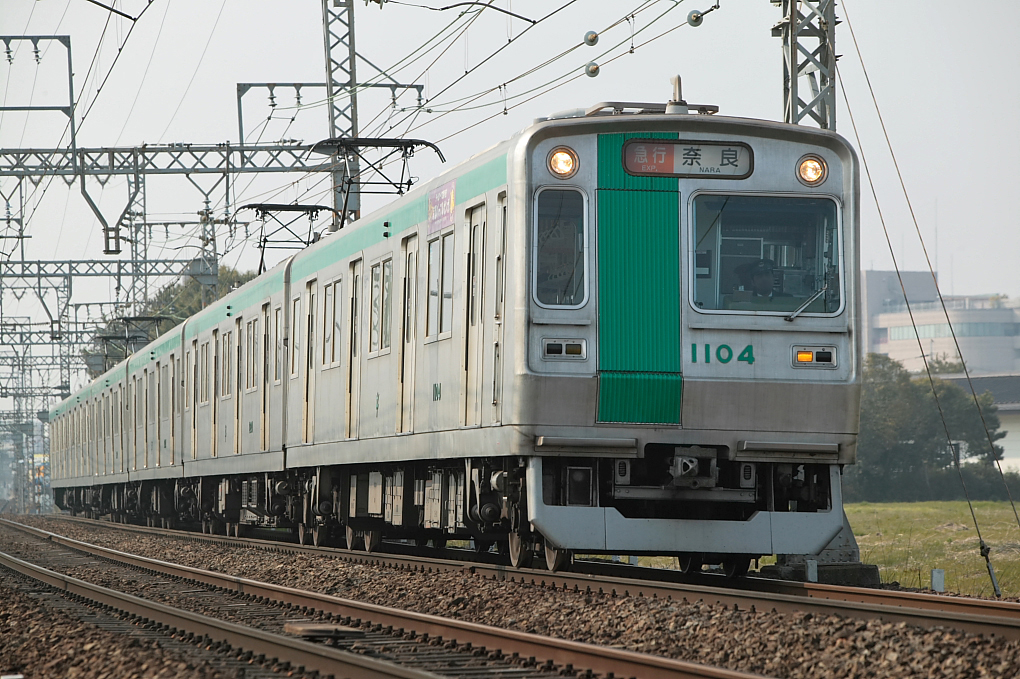
Kyoto Municipal Subway 10 series on the Karasuma Line

The Kyoto Municipal Subway operates the following two lines:

- Karasuma Line
- Tōzai Line

== Bus ==
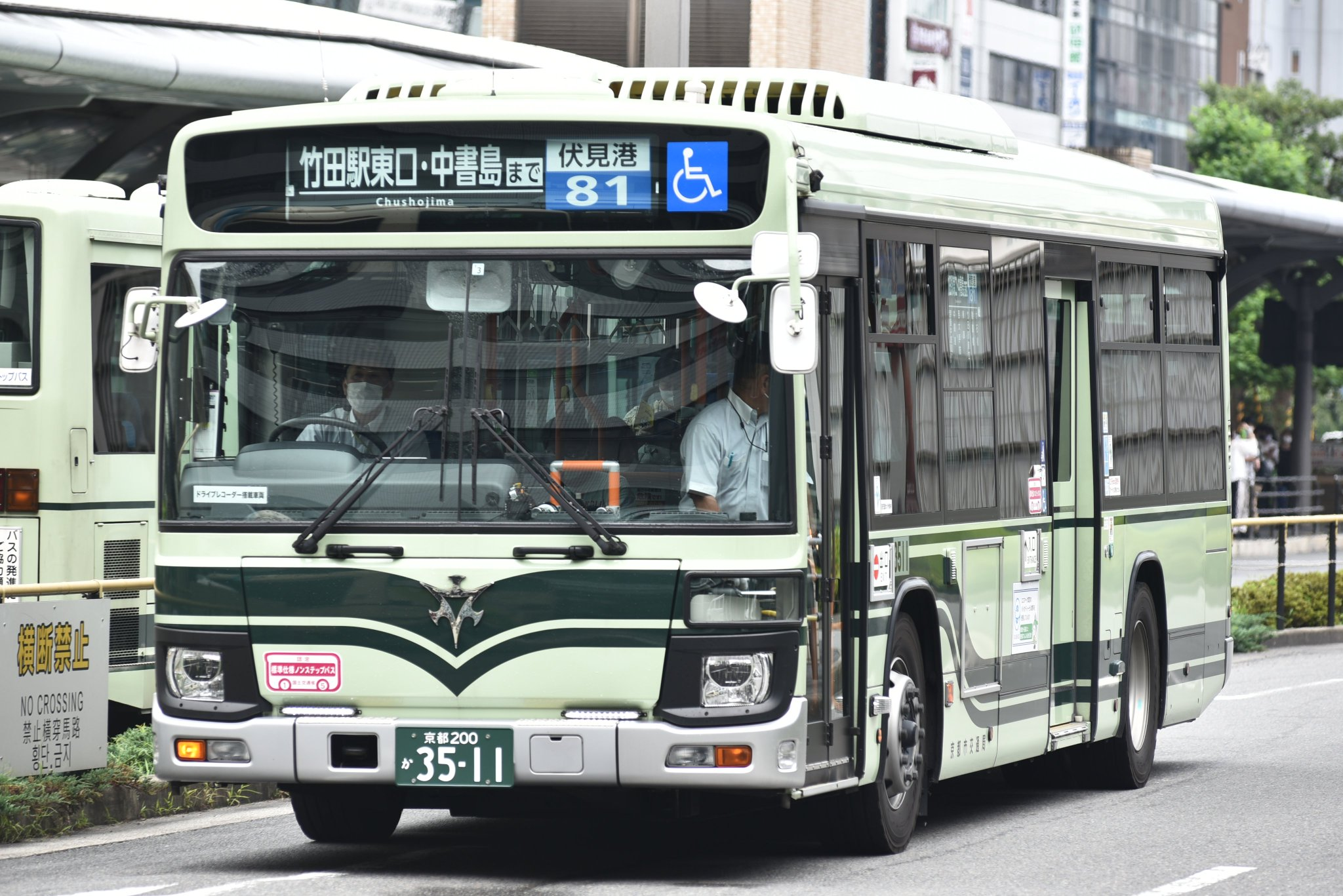
Kyoto City Bus in front of Kyoto Station

The Kyoto City Buses (京都市バス, Kyōto Shi-basu) are a major means of public transport in Kyoto. The buses have been operating since 1928.

Besides the regular commuter routes, the city bus co-operated the city's "Regular Tour Bus" with Keihan Bus.

== Tram ==
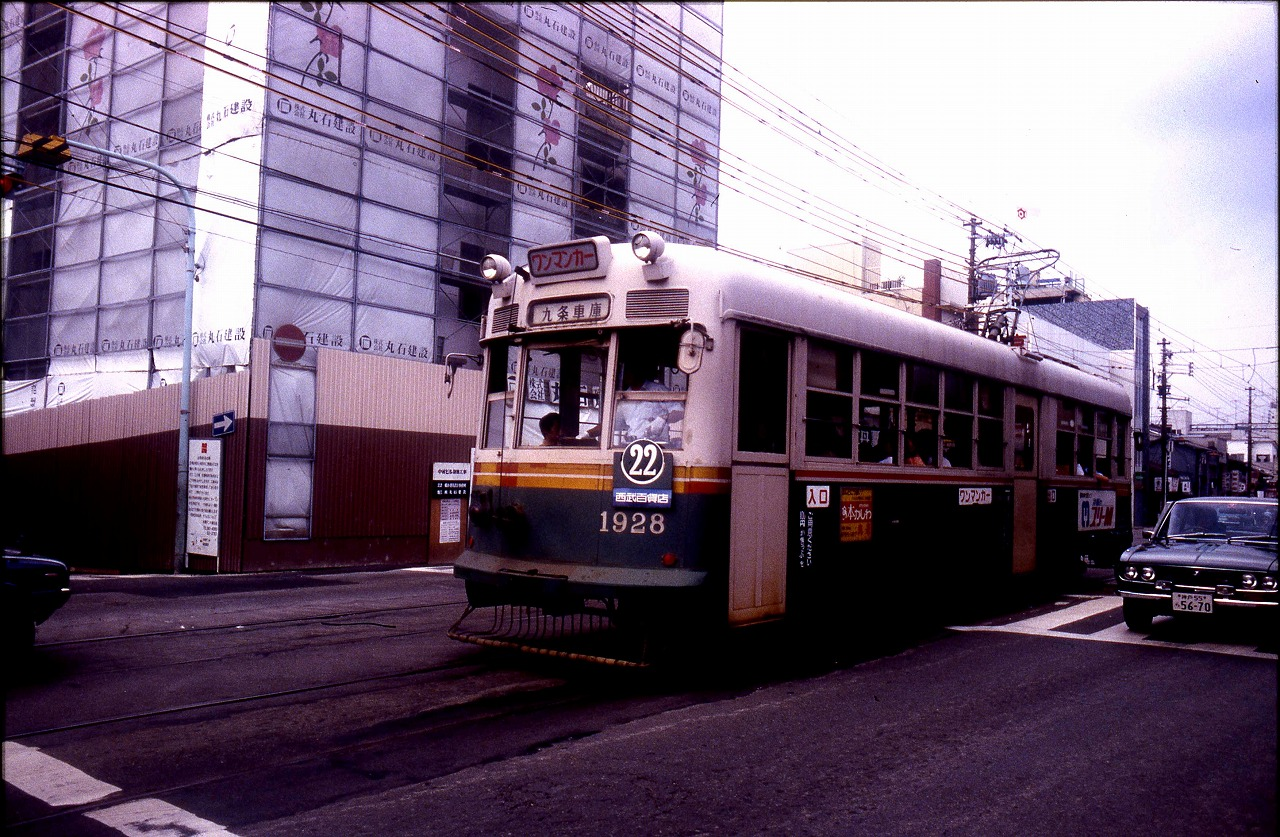
Kyoto City Tram in 1978

Kyoto Municipal Transportation Bureau operated the Kyoto City Tram (ja:京都市電, Kyōto Shiden) until 1978.

Kyoto Electric Railway (1,067 mm (3 ft 6 in) narrow gauge) opened in 1895 as the first electric streetcar in Japan in commercial operation. The city government launched separate network of streetcars of 1,435 mm (4 ft 8 1/2 in) standard gauge in 1912, which absorbed the lines of Kyoto Electric Railway in 1918. Subsequently, the narrow gauge lines were closed, rebuilt in standard gauge, or remained as is (Kitano Line).

In its peak of the 1960s, the network was as follows:

- Loop line
  - Gaishū Line (Loop on Higashiyama, Kujō, Nishiōji, Kitaōji streets)
- East-West lines
  - Imadegawa Line
  - Marutamachi Line
  - Shijō Line
  - Shichijō Line
- North-South lines
  - Senbon Line
  - Karasuma Line
  - Kawaramachi Line
  - Shirakawa Line
  - Fushimi Line
  - Kitano Line (narrow gauge, closed in 1961)

Because of increasing congestion of road traffic, the tram was abolished in 1978. Part of disused cars were sold to other cities in Japan. As of 2010, Hiroshima Electric Railway and Iyo Railway still operate ex-Kyoto tram cars. One of the cars transferred to Hankai Tramway is now preserved at Old Pueblo Trolley in Tucson, Arizona.

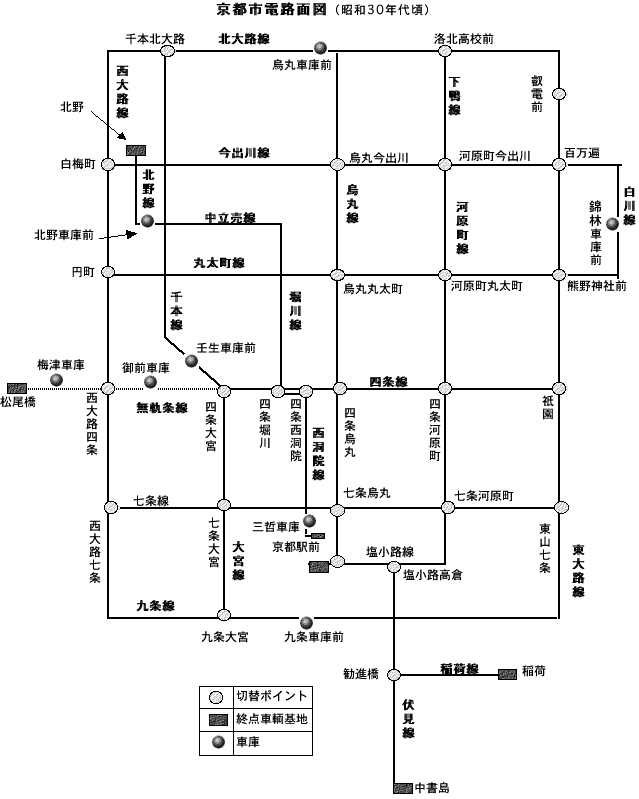
Map of the Kyoto City Tram network (circa 1955)

== Trolley bus ==
Between 1932 and 1969, the bureau also operated the Umezu Line, a trolley bus service connecting Shijō Ōmiya (Hankyu Ōmiya Station) and Matsuobashi.

== Public relations ==
The bureau has had events that promote increased ridership of their transit system. In 2013, "Get on! Kyoto City Subway" campaign with anime-style characters began. The characters and logo are also used for Kyoto City Bus.

== See also ==
- List of metro systems
