= 20 series =

20 series may refer to:

== Electronics ==
- GeForce 20 series graphics processing units made by Nvidia

== Train Types ==
- Kyoto Municipal Subway 20 series operating for the Kyoto Municipal Subway
- Osaka Municipal Subway New 20 series electric multiple unit operating for Osaka Metro
