= 10 series =

10 series may refer to:

== Electronics ==
- GeForce 10 series graphics processing units made by Nvidia

== Train types ==
- Kyoto Municipal Subway 10 series electric multiple unit operating for the Kyoto Municipal Subway
- Osaka Municipal Subway 10 series electric multiple unit operating for Osaka Metro
