= Sai-in =

Saiin may refer to:

- Saiin (priestess), female relatives of the Emperor of Japan who served at Kamo Shrine
- Saiin Station, Hankyu Kyoto line train station
- Sai-in Temple (Nara), the western structure of the greater Hōryū-ji complex in Nara
