= Get on! Kyoto City Subway =

Japanese advertising campaign

Logo

Get on! Kyoto City Subway (Japanese: 地下鉄に乗るっ, Hepburn: Chikatetsu ni Noru) is a Japanese multimedia advertising campaign produced by the Kyoto Municipal Transportation Bureau since 2013.

== History ==
The origin of the project, a campaign to increase Kyoto Municipal Subway passengers by 50 thousand, started in 2011. At that time, one of the project team called 'Moe-Moe Challenge team' created a character, 'Moe Uzumasa', to promote subway. After that, the project team created her friends and families in sequence.

In 2013, Kyoto Municipal Transportation Bureau held a competition to promote Kyoto Municipal Subway using the characters. Then the characters' refine plan proposed by GK Kyoto, a design studio in Kyoto, was adopted unanimously. Through the refine plan, campaign posters using Moe and her friends, Saki and Misa, with the sales copy 'Get on! Kyoto City Subway'. These characters were newly illustrated by Kamogawa.

== Characters ==
Characters' detailed information was published for the alternative fiction event.

=== Main characters ===
Moe Uzumasa (太秦 萌, Uzumasa Moe)
Voiced by: Nana Hasegawa
Moe is a second-year student of high school. She loves a subway affected by her father. She lives near Uzumasa Tenjingawa Station. Her hobby is taking pictures.
Saki Matsuga (松賀 咲, Matsuga Saki)
Voiced by: Yui Tsukada
Saki is Moe's childhood friend. She belongs to the track and field club and is good at running. She lives near Matsugasaki Station.
Misa Ono (小野 ミサ, Ono Misa)
Voiced by: Mimori Tanigake
Misa is Moe's childhood friend. She wears lower half-rimmed glasses. She joined light music club in high school and play the guitar affected by an animation program. She lives near Ono Station.
Rei Uzumasa (太秦 麗, Uzumasa Rei)
Voiced by: Kana Takemura
Rei is Moe's older sister and 25 years old. She works as a curator at a museum in Kyoto. She likes Sake and Tsukemono.
Ryō Ono (小野 陵, Ono Ryō)
Voiced by: Mitsuo Yūki
Ryō is Misa's older brother. He is a student of a university and studying design. He is a geek of digital gadgets.
Takeru Jūjō (十条 タケル, Jūjō Takeru)
Voiced by: Kaito Yuasa
Takeru is Ryō's high school friend. He is an apprentice to a baker. He lives near Jūjō Station.
Miyako-kun (都くん, Miyako-kun)
Voiced by: Mitsuko Ōkubo
Miyako-kun is a mascot character of Kyoto Municipal Subway. He is modeled after rolling stock '50 series' operated on Tozai Line.
Kyō-chan (京ちゃん, Kyō-chan)
Voiced by: Mitsuko Ōkubo
Kyō-chan is a mascot character of Kyoto City Bus.

=== Collaborated characters ===
Sono Uzumasa (太秦 その, Uzumasa Sono)
Voiced by: Haruka Tomatsu
Sono is Moe's cousin. She is an official character for Kyoto Gakuen University, which is near Uzumasa Tenjingawa Station. She loves Parantica sita.
Miyu Karasuma (烏丸 ミユ, Karasuma Miyu)
Miyu is Ryō's university friend. She is an official character for Kyoto International Manga Museum. She lives near Karasuma Oike Station. She knows a lot about comics. She sometimes works at a part-time shrine maiden at her grandparents' shrine.
Kyōka Ise (伊勢 京香, Ise Kyōka)
Kyōka is Rei's drinking companion. She works in JR Kyoto Isetan as an assistant buyer.
Kakeru Kitamaya (北山 駆, Kitayama Kakeru)
Kakeru is a member of Super command rescue team in Kyoto City Fire Department. He lives near Kitayama Station. He loves Rāmen, but he easily burn his mouth.
Aoi Nijo (二条 葵, Nijō Aoi)
Aoi is a firefighter of Kyoto City Fire Department. She lives near Nijō Station. She studies the soup broth of Udon.
Miyabi Shijō (四条 みやび, Shijō Miyabi)
Miyabi works in the public relations department of Daimaru Kyoto Store. She lives near Imadegawa Station. She loves Japanese sweets.

== Media ==
=== Anime ===
First 15-second-long anime commercials were produced in 2014 by Gyorai Eizō Inc. with the background theme "sakura" performed by Harumi Ōki. In 2015, another 15-second-long commercials were released.

A short animation was announced in 2016 as a crowdfunding campaign. At first, the goal of the campaign was 1 million yen, but it finally surpassed 10 million Yen, and released in May 2017. Its ending theme is "Kōsen" performed by Harumi Ōki.

In 2018, another crowdfunding campaign was announced to produce anime commercials with male characters, Takeru and Ryo. It finally surpassed 3 million Yen, and released in May 2019.

=== Novels ===
A light novel adaptation written by Motoki with art by Kamogawa was first released in 2015. In 2018, another novel adaptation written by Mai Mochizuki was released.

Kyo Girls Days

No.	Release date	ISBN
1	September 2, 2015	978-4-0638-1489-7
2	September 2, 2016	978-4-0638-1553-5

Uzumasa-so Diary

No.	Release date	ISBN
1	September 13, 2018	978-4-575-52150-4
2	April 11, 2019	978-4-575-52202-0
3	September 12, 2019	978-4-575-52264-8
