= All-Japan High School Ekiden Championship =

School sports competition in Japan

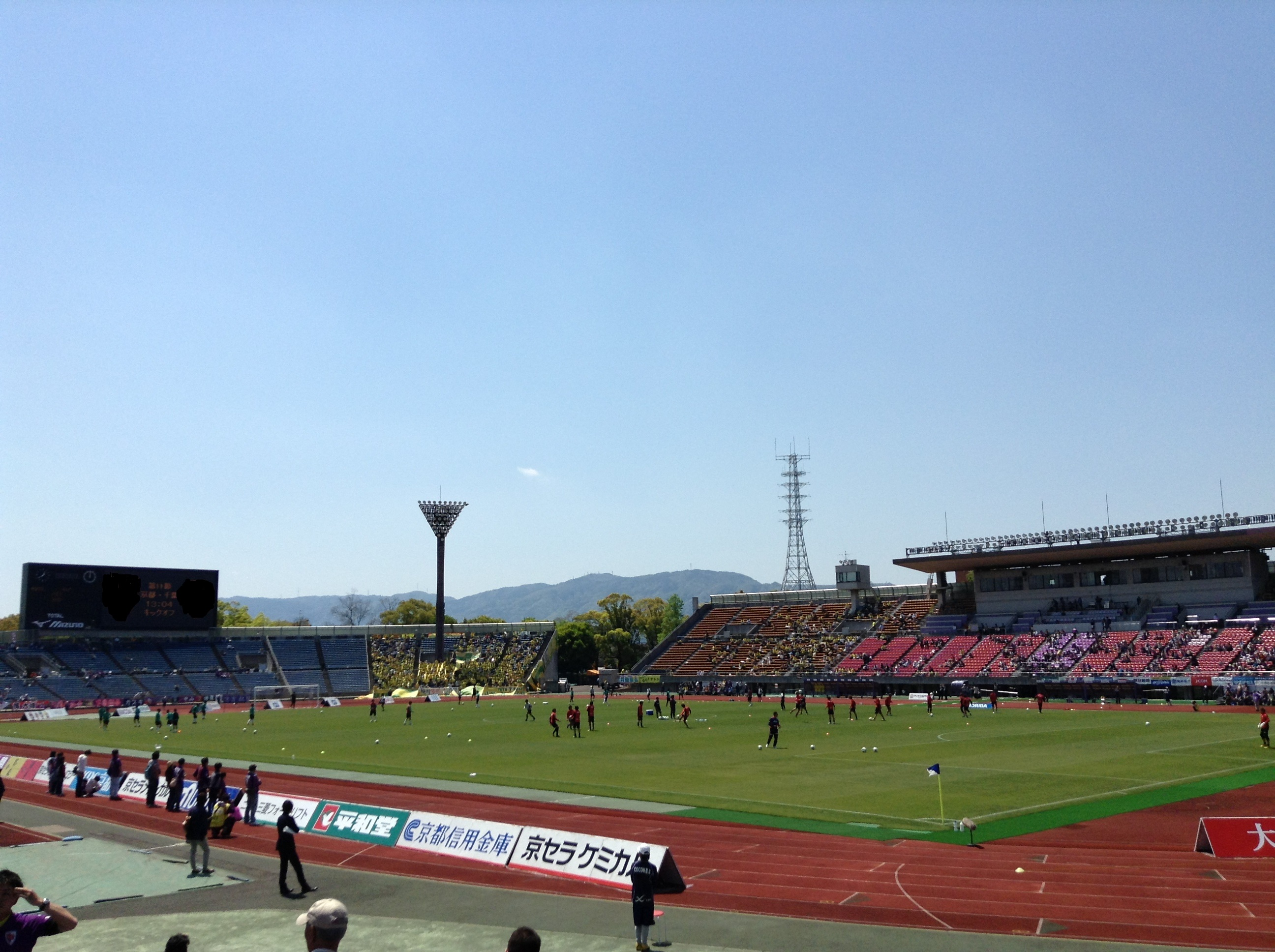
Nishikyogoku Athletic Stadium is the start and end point of the race

The All-Japan National Ekiden Championships are held for junior high and high school teams in late December, as main track and field outdoor competitions have concluded and the school year is nearing its end. A series of city (2010 Tokyo city championships video), prefectural and regional championships in November (Japanrunningnews) select the representative school teams for the national championship in late December. Competition is school-based rather than club or organization based. No regional all-star teams compete in these championships. At the high school championships, forty seven high schools send boys' teams and 47 send girls' teams to Kyoto, Japan.

== Race format ==
Although there is no single definition of ekiden format, for purposes of the Japanese national championships for junior high school and high school, the format has been set. Junior high school in Japan comprises grades 7 through 9, followed by 3 years in high school. For junior high school girls, a team of 5 girls run stages that follow the 3 - 2 - 2 - 2 - 3 kilometer pattern (total 12 kilometers). The boys team is 6 runners following the 3 - 3 - 3 - 3 - 3 - 3 kilometer pattern (total 18 kilometers). High school girls cover a half marathon; 5 runners follow the 6 - 4.1 - 3 - 3 - 5 kilometer pattern (total 21.1 kilometers). High school boys cover a full marathon; 7 runners follow the 10 - 3 - 8.1075 - 8.0875 - 3 - 5 - 5 kilometer pattern (total 42.195 kilometers). Since the high school championships were begun in 1950 (boys) and 1989 (girls), on only 3 occasions has the boys race been slightly shorter; once for the girls. See the Kyoto 2011 girls course map; 2011 boys course map; an interactive map for 2011 showing elevation change too.

== Level of competition ==
The high school ekiden is a mixture of middle distance (3 and 5 kilometers) and long distance (8 and 10 kilometers) legs. Japanese athletics considers 3000 meters and 5000 meters to be middle distance running event, whereas others consider them to be long distance. A look at the middle distance high school results in general for Japan (specifically 3000 meters for girls, 5000 meters for boys) provides a preview of the competition in the ekiden. In 2008 in Japan, at the 5000 meter distance, 575 high school boys were under 15:00, beginning 13:33.24. For the high school girls during 2008, for the 3000 meter distance, 485 high school girls were under 10:00, the fastest being 8:58.77.

For the national championship, in all, 290 girls and 329 boys competed in 2008. The girls teams consist of 5 runners and 3 alternates. Of the 47 schools that qualified in 2008, 36 schools listed at least five runners with 3000 meter times under 10:00. Twelve schools had all 8 girls listed under 10:00. The boys teams consist of 7 runners and 3 alternates. Of the schools that qualified in 2008, 31 schools listed at least five runners with 5000 meter times under 15:00. Sixteen schools listed at least 8 runners under 15:00. Data for 2011 can be seen courtesy of NHK (in Japanese): Girls boys. Team profiles for 2011 in English are also available; this source lists the individual best times for a team and the time difference between the first and fifth runner, a standard format for describing cross country team performance in America.

The 7 boys of the winning team in 2008 covered the marathon distance in 2:02:18, which is an average of a 14:29.5 5k pace (the average stage distance was 6028m). The 40th place team (in a field of 47 teams) maintained a 15:34 5k pace. The 5 girls of the winning team in 2008 covered the half marathon distance in 1:07:37, which is a 9:36.5 3k pace (average leg is 4219m). The 40th place team had a 3k pace of 10:20. Of the 47 high schools that qualified boys teams in 2009, 313 athletes had 5000 meter personal bests of under 15:00. Of the 47 high schools that qualified girls teams in 2009, 215 athletes had 3,000 meter personal bests of under 10:00.

== Race results ==
For 2011 team results in Japanese, check: girls boys. The following links provide extensive English results for 2010 and 2011. Japan Running News provides extensive English commentary: 2011 pre race commentary and 2011 post race commentary.

Team Champions 2008-2011
	Boys	Team Champion	Team Time	Girls	Team Champion	Team Time
2008	59th	Nagano Sakuchosei HS	2:02.18	20th	Aichi Toyokawa HS	1:07.37
2009	60th	Hiroshima Sera HS	2:04.09	21st	Aichi Toyokawa HS	1:08.27
2010	61st	Kagoshima Jitsugyo HS	2:03:59	22nd	Okayama Kojokan HS	1:07:50
2011	62nd	Hiroshima Sera HS	2:03:50	23rd	Aichi Toyokawa HS	1:07:29

BOYS Stage Best Times
	Stage One 10.0 km	Stage Two 3.0 km	Stage Three 8.1075 km	Stage Four 8.0875 km	Stage Five 3.0 km	Stage Six 5.0 km	Stage Seven 5.0 km
2008	Wataru Ueno Sendai Ikuei HS; 29:50	Akihiro Fujiwara Kyushu Gakuin HS; 8:17	Paul Kuira Sendai Ikuei HS; 23:07	Bedan Karoki Sera HS; 22:32 new stage record	Tsubasa Fujii Saku Chosei HS; 8:24	Hiroyuki Sasaki Saku Chosei HS; 14:14 new stage record	Suguru Osako Saku Chosei HS; 14:11
2009	Suguru Osako Saku Chosei HS; 29:06	Otake Ishiwaka Nishiwaki Kogyo HS; 8:20	Bedan Karoki Sera HS; 22:48	Ikki Takeuchi Sera HS; 23:27	Junpei Miyazawa Saitama Sakae HS; 8:42	Kentaro Yano Saitama Sakae HS; 14:56	Kazuma Kubota Kyushu Gakuin HS; 14:35
2010	Kazuto Nishiike Suma Gakuen HS; 29:35	Yudai Yamamoto Suma Gakuen HS; 8:18	Charles Ndirangu Sera HS; 22:41	Bernard Waweru Sendai Ikuei HS; 23:27	Takuma Sano Suma Gakuen HS; 8:43	Hiroshi Ichida Kagoshima Jitsugyo HS; 14:40	Koki Takada Kagoshima Jitsugyo HS; 14:31
2011	Kazuma Kubota Kyushu Gakuin HS; 29:38	Koki Maeda Omuta HS; 8:17	Charles Ndirangu Sera HS; 22:51	Kazuma Taira Toyokawa Kogyo HS; 23:32	Shoya Okuno Toyokawa Kogyo HS; 8:54	Hiram Ngatia Sendai Ikuei HS; 14:23	Tadashi Isshiki Sendai Ikuei HS; 14:13

GIRLS Stage Best Times
	Stage One 6.0 km	Stage Two 4.0975 km	Stage Three 3.0 km	Stage Four 3.0 km	Stage Five 5.0 km
2008	Rei Obara Kojokan HS; 19:33	Nanaka Izawa Toyokawa HS; 12:54	Natsuki Kawakami Suga Gakuen HS; 9:28	Waka Shimomura Toyokawa HS; 9:14	Felista Wanjugu Aomori Yamada HS; 15:04 - new stage record
2009	Nanaka Izawa Toyokawa HS; 19:43	Saori Noda Chiharadai HS; 12:51	Minami Nakaarai Suma Gakuen HS; 9:40	Rie Toda Kojokan HS; 9:33	Murugi Wainaina Toyokawa HS; 16:04
2010	Katsuki Suga Kojokan HS; 19:29	Risa Yokoe Suma Gakuen HS; 12:44	Mika Kobayashi - Suma Gakuen HS Nana Fukuzaki - Sendai Ikuei HS; Shiho Takeda -Tokiwa HS; 9:51	Hiroka Akamatsu; Kojokan HS 9:35	Murugi Wainaina; Toyokawa HS 15:40
2011	Yuriko Kosaki Narita HS; 19:21	Risa Yokoe Suma Gakuen HS; 12:55	Yui Fukuda Suma Gakuen HS; 9:44	Fumika Sasaki Nagano Higashi HS; 9:32	Mary Waithira Sendai Ikuei HS; 15:20

== Issue of non-Japanese citizen runners ==
The recent top times for the opening leg of the girls and boys high school national ekiden championships have been dominated by foreign exchange students at Japanese high schools. The issue of foreign students competing in the first stage can be seen when looking at the top 10 performance lists. In the case of the 10 kilometer first stage in the boys race, it was necessary to extend the top 10 performance list to the top 30 to obtain 10 Japanese athletes, the first one being 14th. Foreign students in the women's race have not displaced Japanese runners to the same degree, with only 4 foreigners mingled in the top 10 of the opening stage.

Starting in 2008, the All Japan High School Athletic Federation has banned non-Japanese high school students from participating in the first leg of their Ekiden Championships. For 15 straight years, a foreign student attending a Japanese high school has won the boys 10 kilometer first stage. With the new ban, speculation was high about which Japanese boy would be the first Japanese win the first stage. In 2008, foreign students were on top in the remaining long stages, posting the fastest times in the 3rd and 4th (8+ kilometer) stages of the boys race, and posting the fastest and third fastest times in the 5th stage (5 kilometers) of the girls race.

The controversy that has recently surrounded the Ekiden also applies to different degrees to participation in basketball, volleyball and table tennis. The official reason for this is stated by the Federation to be "to make races more interesting for fans". However, it has been widely reported that the principal motivation for the ban is to break that succession of victories in the event by high school students of black African descent (and in the case of table tennis, of Chinese and Indonesian descent). The corporate national ekiden championships (male and female) have policies similar to the high school policy.

== See also ==
- Relay race
- Cross country running
- Nike Cross Nationals
