= Ōmiya Station (Kyoto) =

Railway station in Kyoto, Japan

Coordinates: 35°0′13.7″N 135°44′57″E

Ōmiya Station 大宮駅
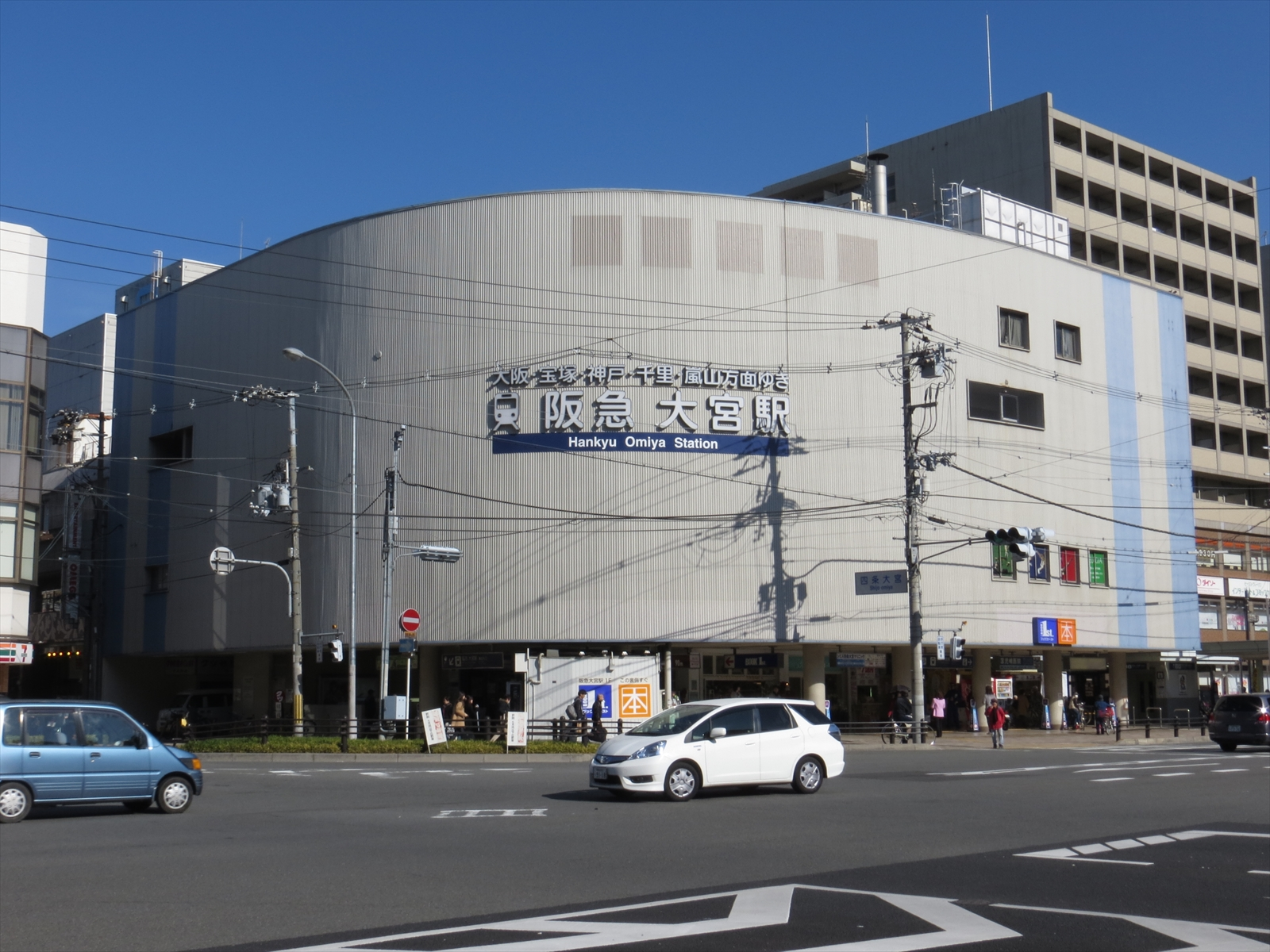
- Station building

General information
- Location: Nakagyō, Kyoto, Kyoto; Japan
- Operator: Hankyu Corporation
- Line: Hankyu Kyoto Main Line
- Tracks: 2
- Connections: Shijō-Ōmiya Station (Randen)

Other information
- Station code: HK-84

History
- Opened: 31 March 1931
- Former names: Keihan Kyōto; Hankyū Kyōto (until 1963)

Passengers
- FY2015: 11.5 million
Location

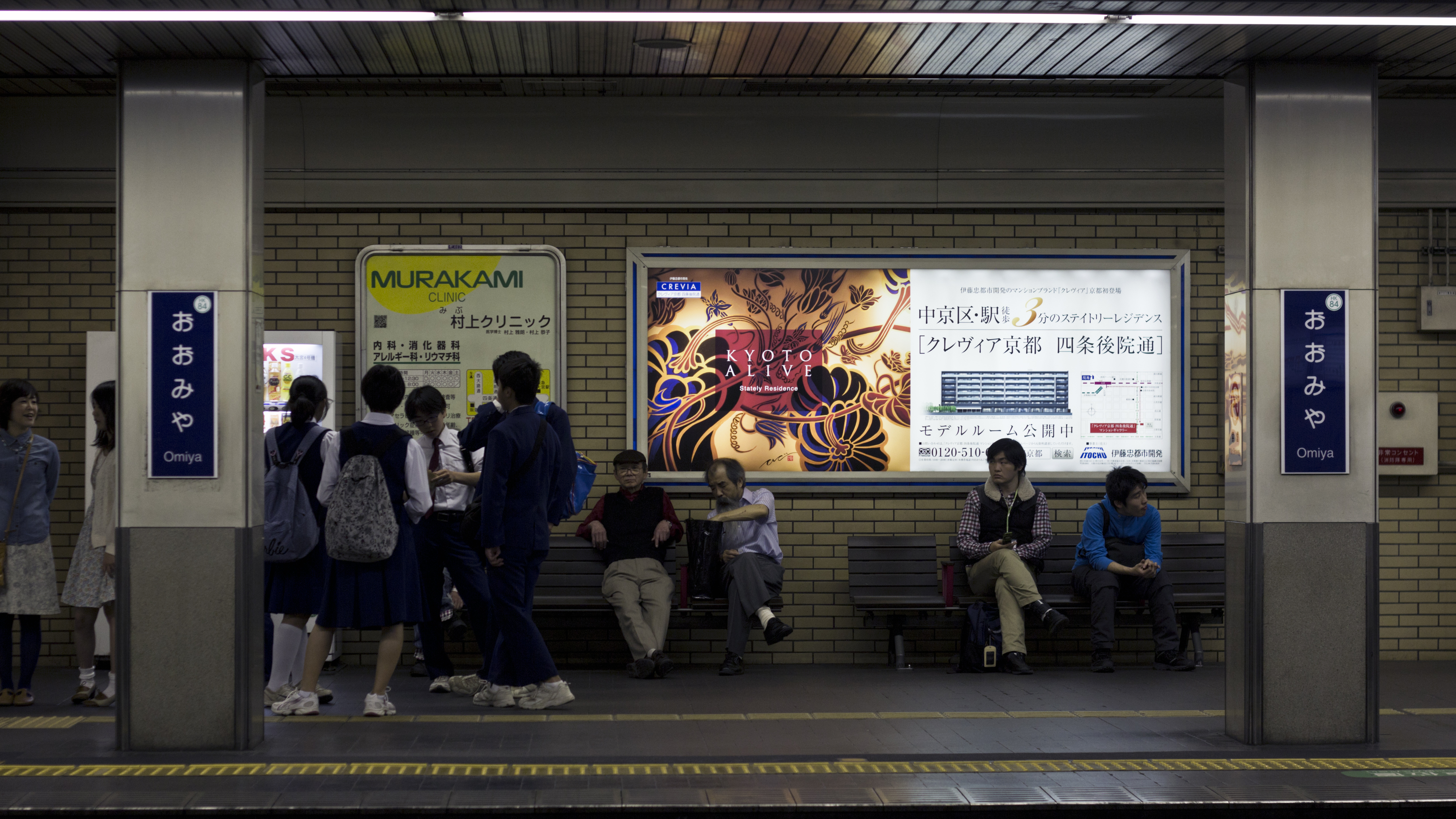
Platform of Omiya station

Ōmiya Station (大宮駅, Ōmiya Eki) is a railway station built underground in Nakagyo-ku, Kyoto, Kyoto, Japan. Hankyu Kyoto Line serves this station. Keifuku Electric Railroad Arashiyama Main Line terminus Shijō-Ōmiya Station locates nearby.

== Layout ==
The station has two side platforms.

1	■ Kyoto Line	for Kyoto Kawaramachi
2	■ Kyoto Line	for Umeda, Kobe and Takarazuka

== Usage ==
In fiscal 2015 (April 2015 to March 2016), about 11,537,000 passengers used this station annually. For historical data, see the table below.

Year	Number (in thousands)	
Year	Boarding	Total
2001	7,092	14,737
2002	6,750	13,766
2003	6,695	13,595
2004	6,552	13,381
2005	6,112	12,738
2006	5,780	11,840
2007	5,986	12,050
2008	5,916	12,078
2009	5,214	10,969
2010	5,039	10,515
2011	4,982	10,181
2012	4,966	10,098
2015	5,639	11,537

== History ==
The station opened on 31 March 1931 as Keihan Kyoto Station of the Shinkeihan Line, then operated by Keihan Electric Railway. After the Shinkeihan Line became the Hankyu Kyoto Line, the station was called Hankyu Kyoto Station. Since 17 June 1963 when the Hankyu Kyoto Line was extended to Kawaramachi Station, the station is no longer terminus and is called Ōmiya Station, after the street name.

Station numbering was introduced to all Hankyu stations on 21 December 2013 with this station being designated as station number HK-84.

== Adjacent stations ==
«	Service	»
Kyoto Main Line
Saiin	Local	Karasuma
Saiin	Semi-Express	Karasuma
Saiin	Express	Karasuma
Saiin	Semi limited Express	Karasuma
Limited Express: Does not stop at this station
Saiin	Commuter Limited Express	Karasuma
Rapid Limited Express "Kyo-Train", "Ogura": Does not stop at this station
Rapid Limited Express A "Kyo-Train": Does not stop at this station
