= Takebishi Stadium Kyoto =

Multi-purpose stadium in Japan

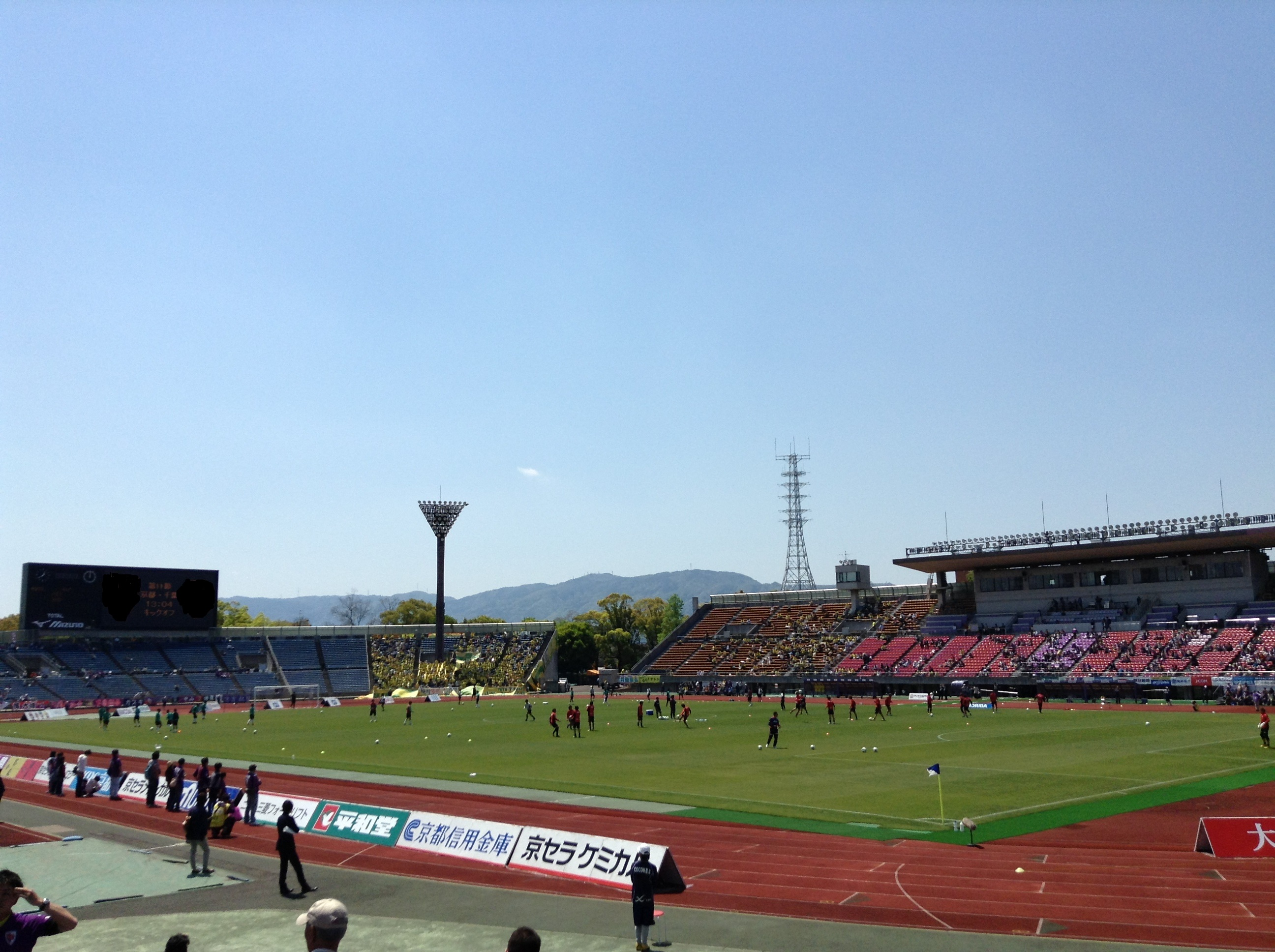
- Interactive map of Takebishi Stadium Kyoto
- Full name: Takebishi Stadium Kyoto
- Former names: Kyoto Nishikyogoku Athletic Stadium (1942-2019)
- Location: Kyoto, Japan
- Coordinates: 34°59′36.52″N 135°42′50.26″E
- Owner: Kyoto City
- Capacity: 20,588
- Surface: Grass
- Field size: 125 m × 78 m
- Public transit: Hankyu Railway: Kyoto Main Line at Nishikyogoku

Construction
- Opened: 1942; 84 years ago
- Expanded: 1985; 41 years ago, 1996; 30 years ago

Tenant
- Kyoto Sanga FC (-2019)

Takebishi Stadium Kyoto (たけびしスタジアム京都) is a multi-purpose stadium in Ukyo-ku, Kyoto, Japan. It was formerly known as Kyoto Nishikyogoku Athletic Stadium. Since August 2019 it has been called Takebishi Stadium Kyoto until July 2029 for the naming rights by Takebishi (たけびし).

It was used mostly for football matches and was the home stadium of J.League club Kyoto Sanga FC until 2019.

The stadium holds 20,588 people and was built in 1942. It hosted the football match between Romania and Ghana during the 1964 Summer Olympics.

In 2019, Kyoto Sanga announced plans to move to Sanga Stadium by Kyocera, a new, football-specific stadium being built in Kameoka, in time for the 2020 season to start.

== Access ==
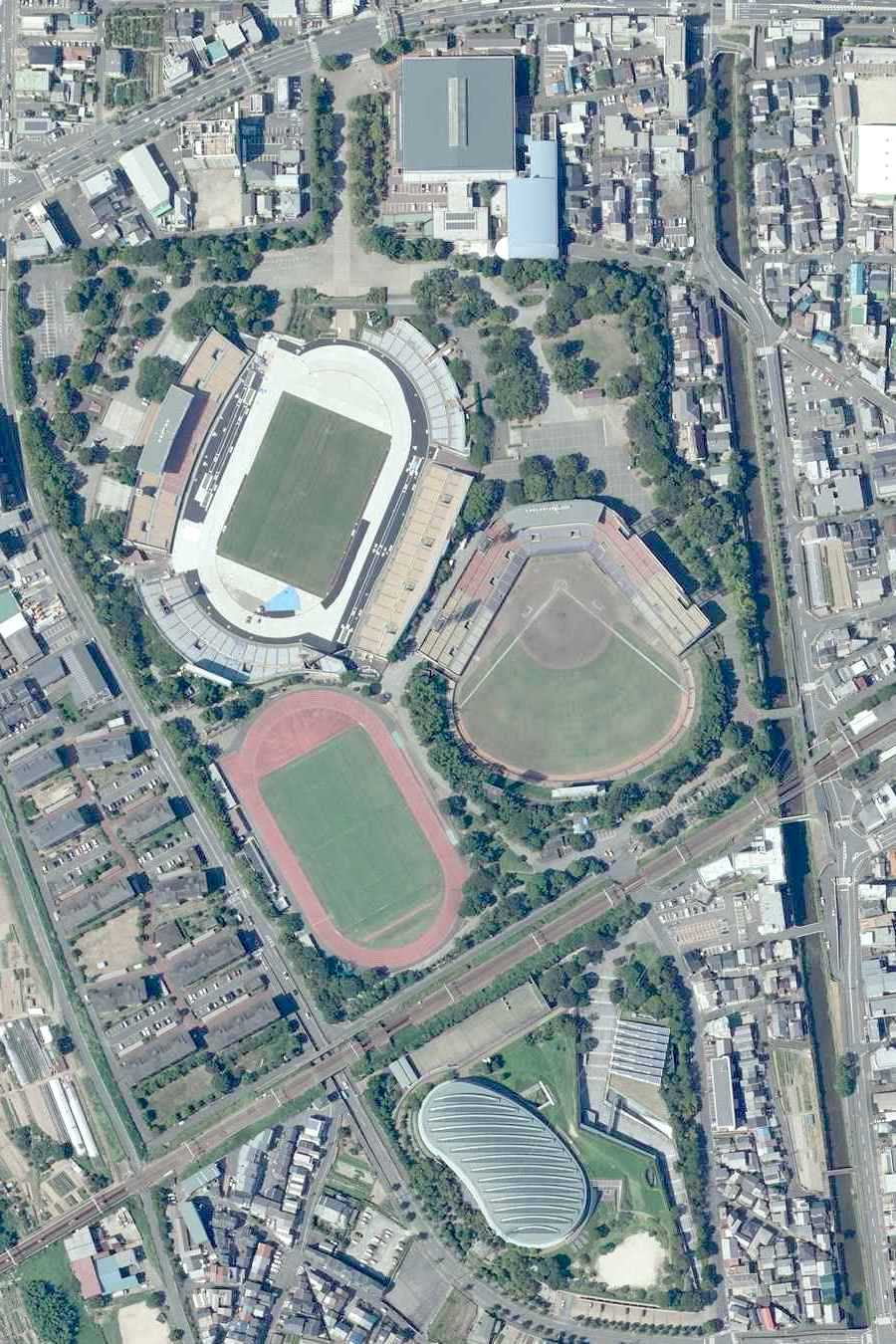
Aerial photograph of Nishikyogoku Sports Park in 2020

3-minute walk from Nishi-Kyōgoku Station on the Hankyū Kyoto Main Line.

== Events ==
- Kyoto Marathon
- All-Japan High School Ekiden Championship
- Inter-Prefectural Women's Ekiden
