= Kyoto Municipal Subway 20 series =

Japanese train type

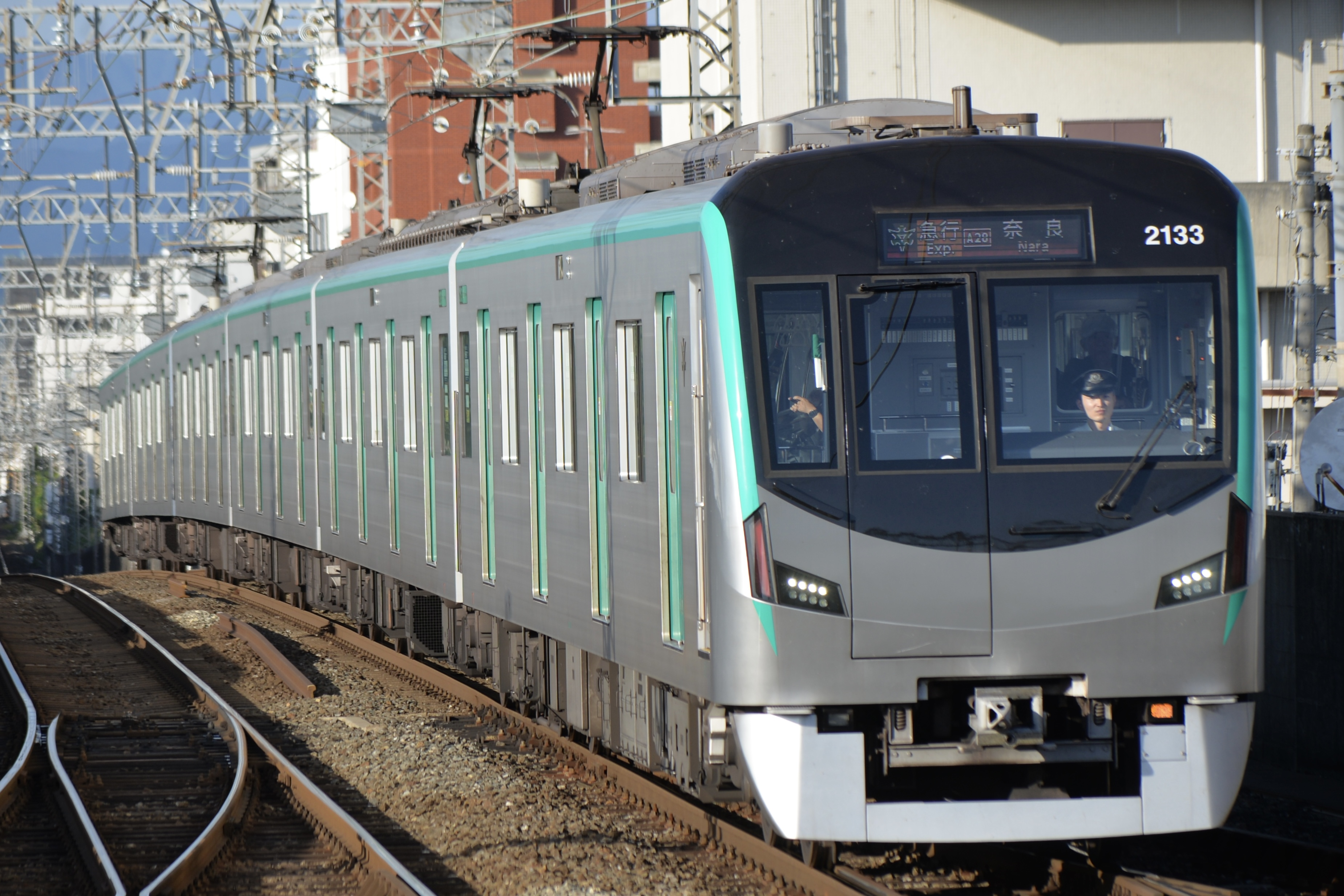
- 20 series train at Ōkubo Station
- In service: 2022–present
- Manufacturer: Kinki Sharyo
- Replaced: 10 series
- Constructed: 2021–
- Number under construction: 30 vehicles (5 sets)
- Number built: 24 vehicles (4 sets)
- Number in service: 18 vehicles (3 sets)
- Formation: 6 cars per trainset
- Fleet numbers: 2x31–2x39
- Capacity: 832 (Note: 143 in intermediate cars, 130 in end cars)
- Operators: Kyoto Municipal Subway
- Lines served: Karasuma Line; A Kintetsu Nara Line; B Kintetsu Kyoto Line

Specifications
- Car body construction: Aluminum alloy
- Car length: 20 m (65 ft 7 in)
- Width: 2.78 m (9 ft 1 in)
- Height: 4.04 m (13 ft 3 in)
- Doors: 4 pairs per side
- Maximum speed: 105 km/h (65 mph)
- Traction system: hybrid SiC-IGBT–VVVF
- Acceleration: 3.3 km/(h⋅s) (2.1 mph/s)
- Deceleration: 3.5 km/(h⋅s) (2.2 mph/s)
- Electric system(s): 1,500 V DC overhead line
- Current collection: Pantograph
- UIC classification: 2′2′+Bo′Bo′+Bo′Bo′+Bo′Bo′+Bo′Bo′+2′2′
- Track gauge: 1,435 mm (4 ft 8 1/2 in) standard gauge

The Kyoto Municipal Subway 20 series (京都市交通局20系電車) is an electric multiple unit (EMU) commuter train type operated by the Kyoto Municipal Subway in Kyoto from March 2022.

== Overview ==
The 20 series was introduced in 2022 with nine 6-car sets. These sets are replacing the oldest of the existing 10 series in service since 1981. Each vehicle costs around ¥200 million (US$1.82 million) to construct. Power consumption on these trains is projected to be about 30 percent less than the 10 series counterparts.

== Formation ==
Trainsets are formed as follows:

Designation	Tc2	M1'	M2'	M2	M1	Tc1
Numbering	28xx	27xx	26xx	23xx	22xx	21xx

== Interior ==
The interior consists of longitudinal seating throughout. Cars 1 and 6 feature leaning pads at the centre of the end section which will increase standing room; these spaces are designated as "Omoiyari Areas".

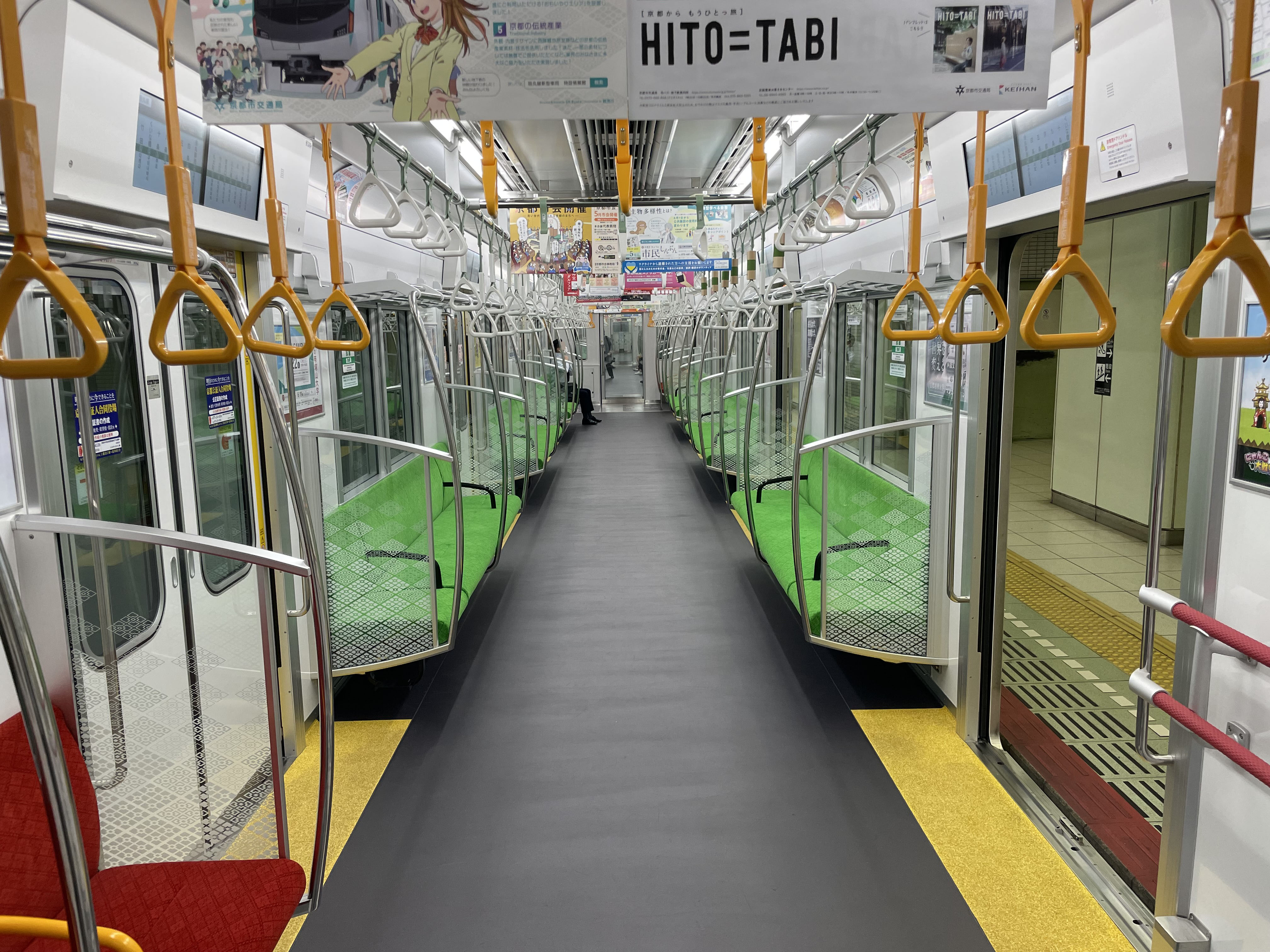
Interior

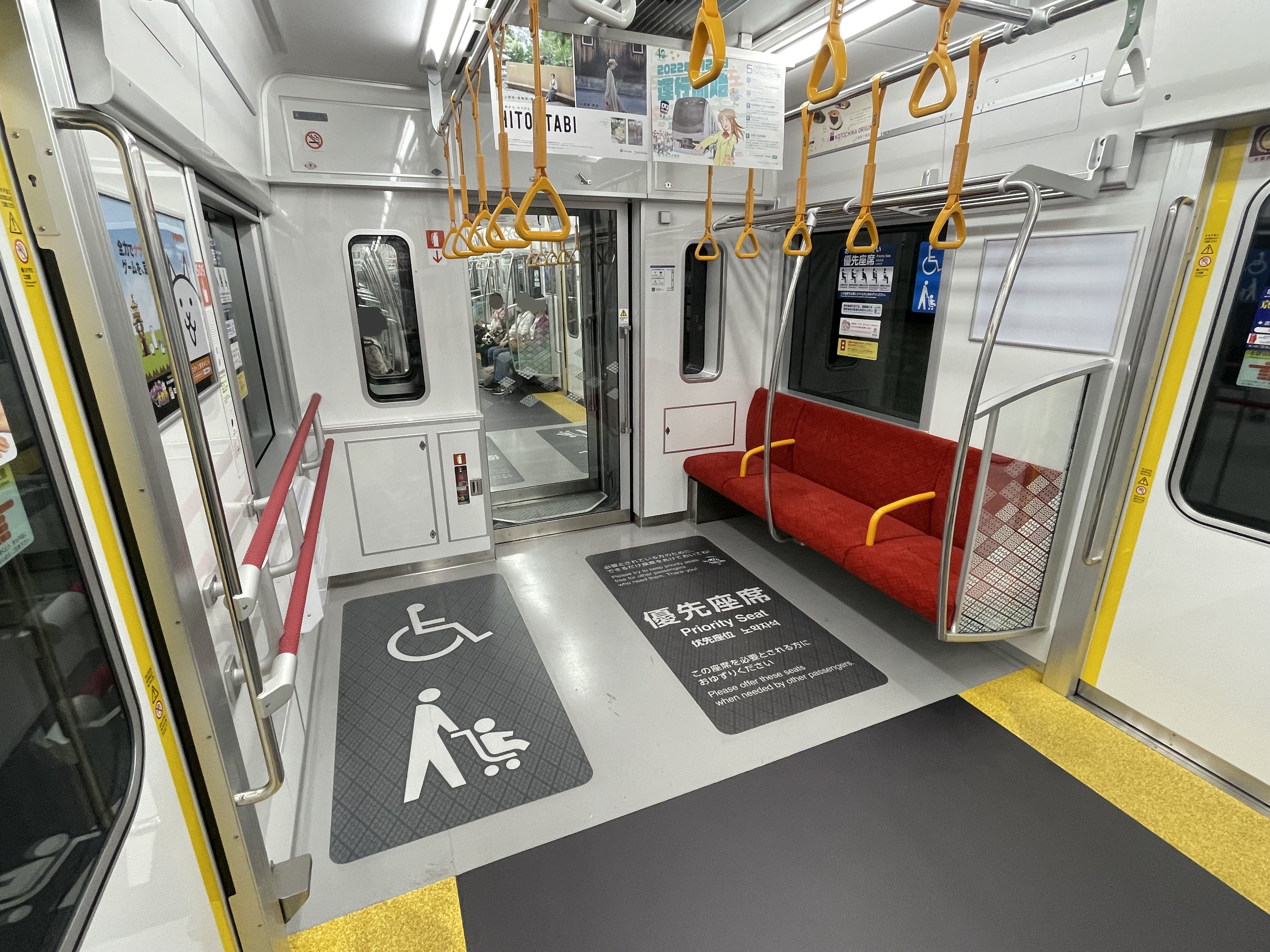
Priority seating area

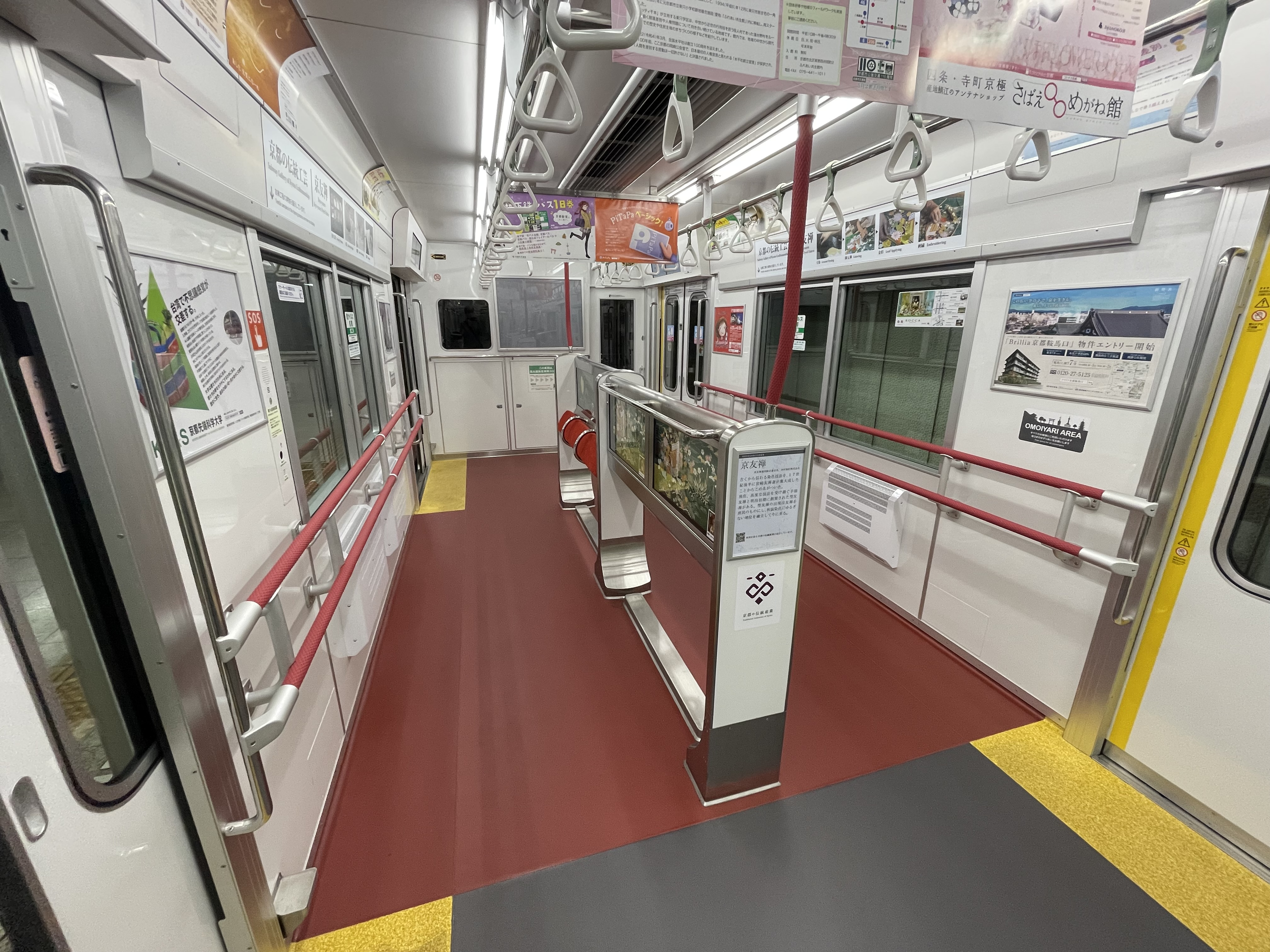
End section featuring accessible space

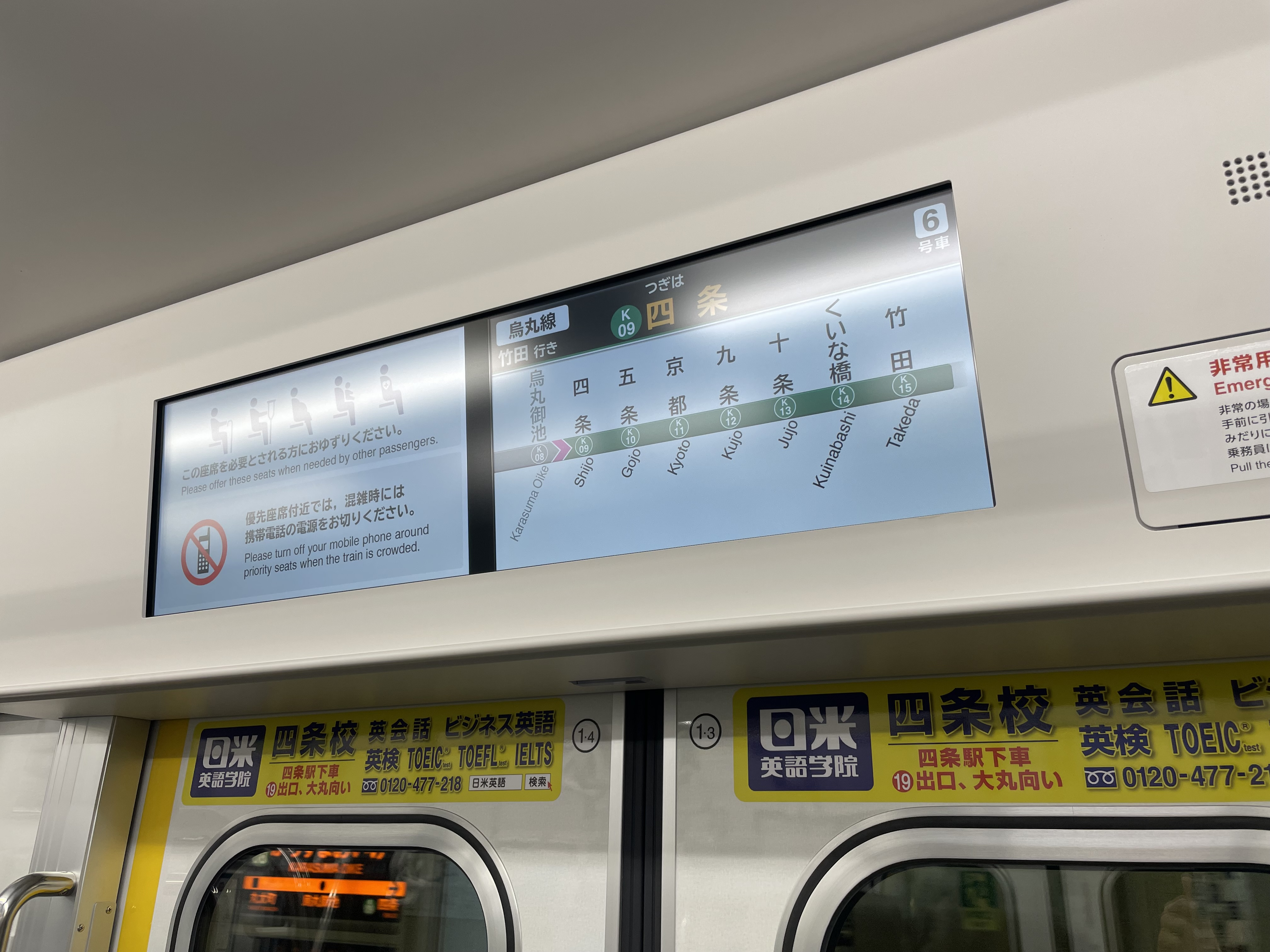
Onboard LCD screens

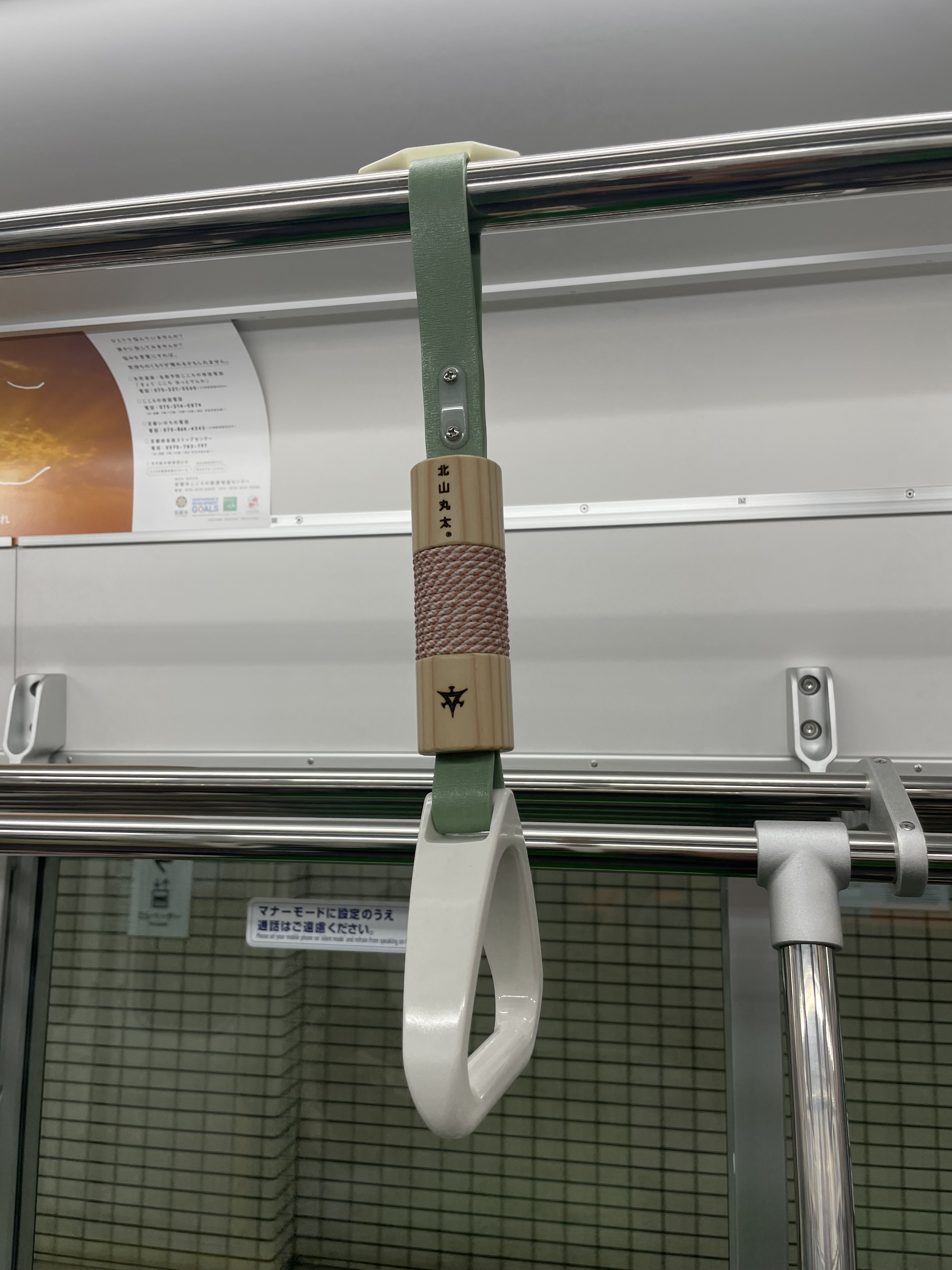
Onboard hand strap

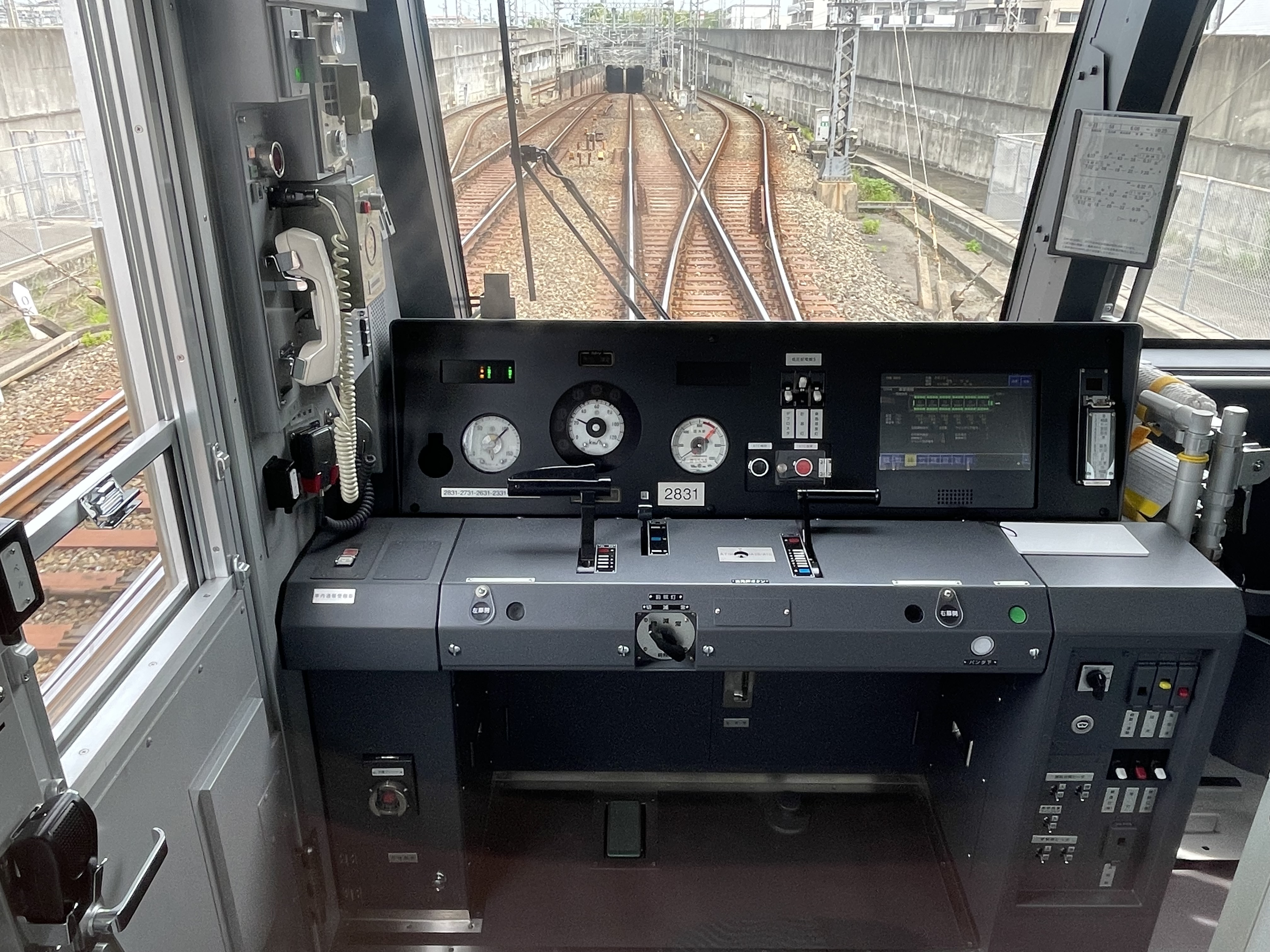
Driver's cab

== History ==
The design of what would become the 20 series was announced by the Kyoto Municipal Transportation Bureau on 29 March 2019 after a public vote.

The first set was delivered in 2021, and test runs commenced in October of that year. A total of 9 sets, 54 cars, are to be built by Kinki Sharyo.

The 20 series made its first trips in revenue service on the Karasuma Line on 26 March 2022; in addition, the fleet began service on the Kintetsu Kyoto and Nara lines from 12 and 17 April of that year, respectively. A second trainset entered service on 21 June 2022. Deliveries are expected to last until 2025.

To commemorate the type receiving the 2022 Good Design Award, a third set, scheduled to enter service on 18 November 2022, was built with commemorative "Kitayama Log" plating. Such plating is due to be applied to the pre-existing fleet as well as subsequent sets.

The 20 series received the 2023 Laurel Prize, presented annually by the Japan Railfan Club.

A fourth set will enter service on 27 September 2023.
