= Nishi-Kyōgoku Station =

Railway station in Kyoto, Japan

Coordinates: 34°59′32.58″N 135°43′5.94″E

Nishi-Kyōgoku Station 西京極駅
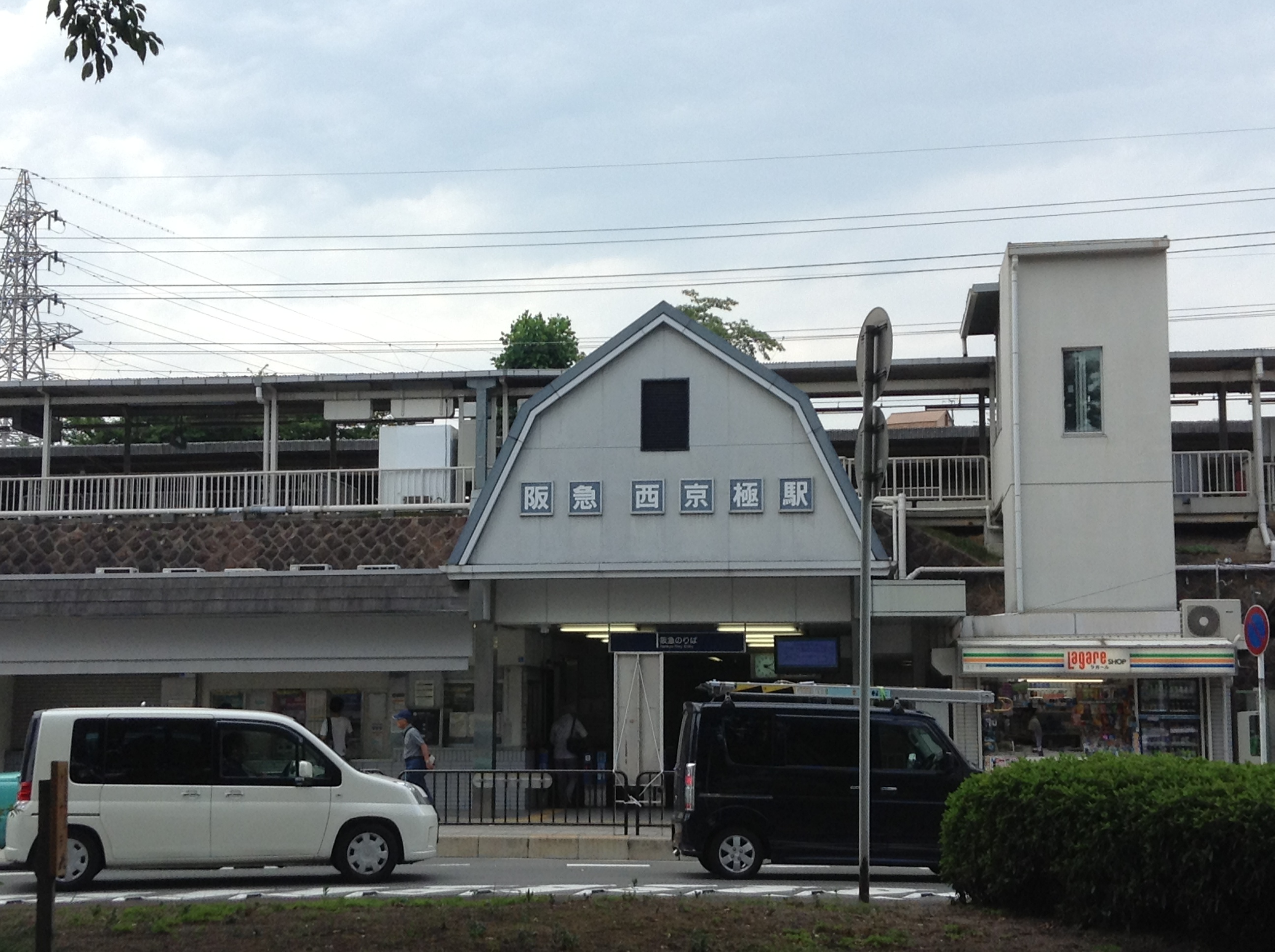

General information
- Other names: Nishikyogoku Athletic Park (西京極総合運動公園前)
- Location: Ukyō, Kyoto, Kyoto; Japan
- Operator: Hankyu Corporation
- Line: Hankyu Kyoto Main Line
- Tracks: 2

Other information
- Station code: HK-82

History
- Opened: 1 November 1928

Passengers
- FY2015: 7.7 million
Location

Nishi-Kyōgoku Station (西京極駅, Nishi-Kyōgoku-eki) is a train station on the Hankyu Railway Kyoto Line located in Ukyo-ku, Kyoto Prefecture, Japan.

It is close to the Nishikyogoku Athletic Stadium and other sports facilities.

== Layout ==
The station has two side platforms serving a track each.

north side	■ Kyoto Line	for Kawaramachi and Karasuma
south side	■ Kyoto Line	for Osaka (Umeda, Tengachaya), Kita-Senri, Kobe, and Takarazuka

== Usage ==
In fiscal 2015 (April 2015 to March 2016), about 7,699,000 passengers used this station annually. For historical data, see the table below.

Year	Number (in thousands)	
Year	Boarding	Total
2001	3,227	
2002	3,118	
2003	3,091	
2004	3,024	
2005	3,143	
2006	3,140	
2007	3,298	6,440
2008	3,445	6,454
2009	3,192	6,470
2010	3,199	6,399
2011	3,192	6,407
2012	3,273	7,233
2015	3,876	7,699

== History ==
Nishi-Kyogoku Station opened on 1 November 1928.

Station numbering was introduced to all Hankyu stations on 21 December 2013 with this station being designated as station number HK-82.

== Stations next to Nishi-Kyōgoku ==
«	Service	»
Hankyu Railway Kyoto Line
Katsura	Local	Saiin
Katsura	Semi-Express	Saiin
Katsura	Express	Saiin
Semi limited Express: Does not stop at this station
Limited Express: Does not stop at this station
Commutation Limited Express: Does not stop at this station
Limited Express "Kyo-Train", "Ogura": Does not stop at this station
