= Saiin Station =

Railway station in Kyoto, Japan

Coordinates: 35°0′13″N 135°43′57″E

Saiin Station 西院駅
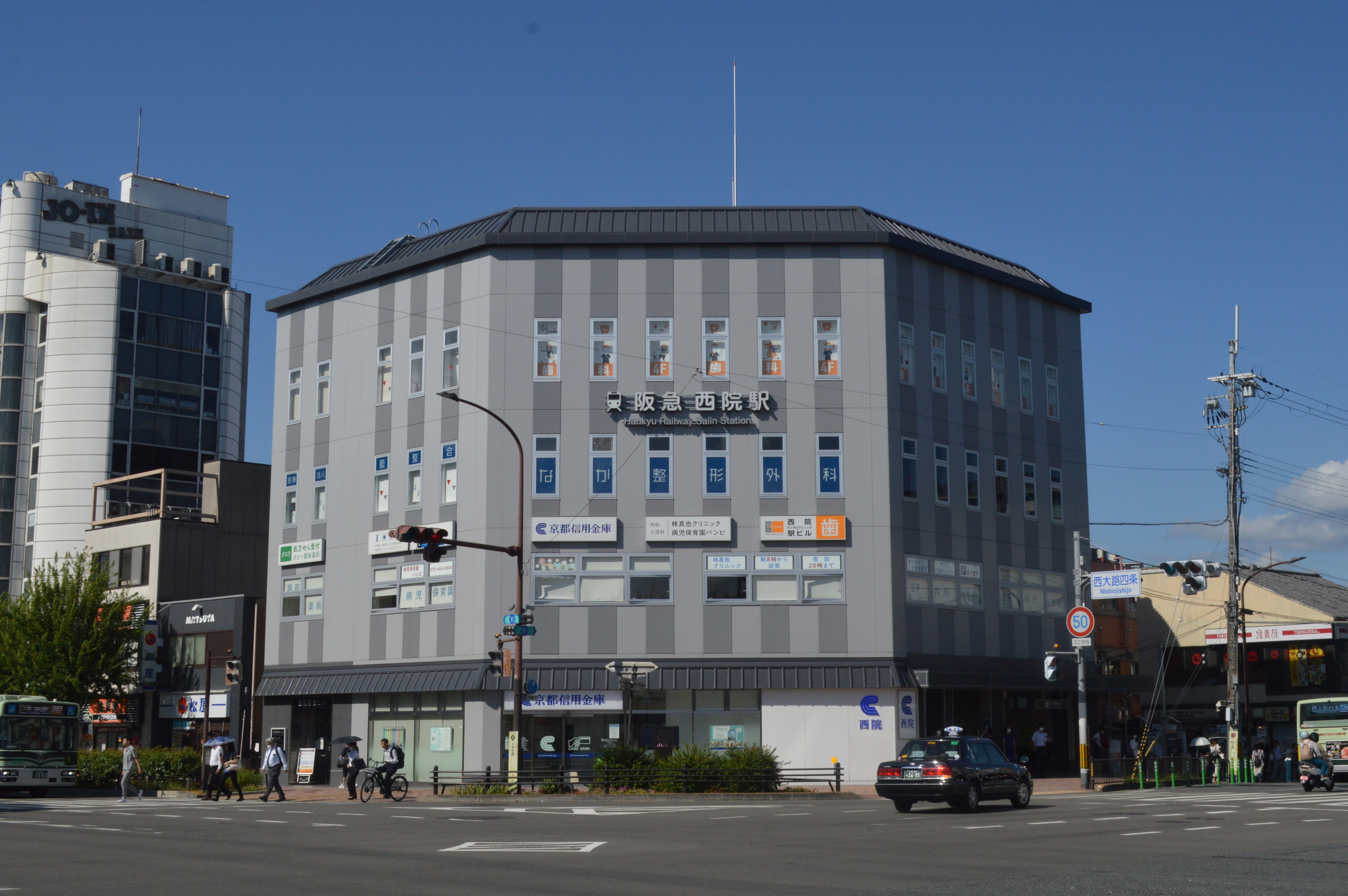

General information
- Location: Ukyō, Kyoto, Kyoto; Japan
- Operator: Hankyu Corporation
- Line: Hankyu Kyoto Main Line
- Platforms: 2
- Tracks: 2

Construction
- Structure type: Underground

Other information
- Station code: HK-83

History
- Opened: 1 November 1928
- Former names: Kyoto Saiin (until 1931)

Passengers
- FY2015: 16.1 million
Location

Sai Station 西院駅
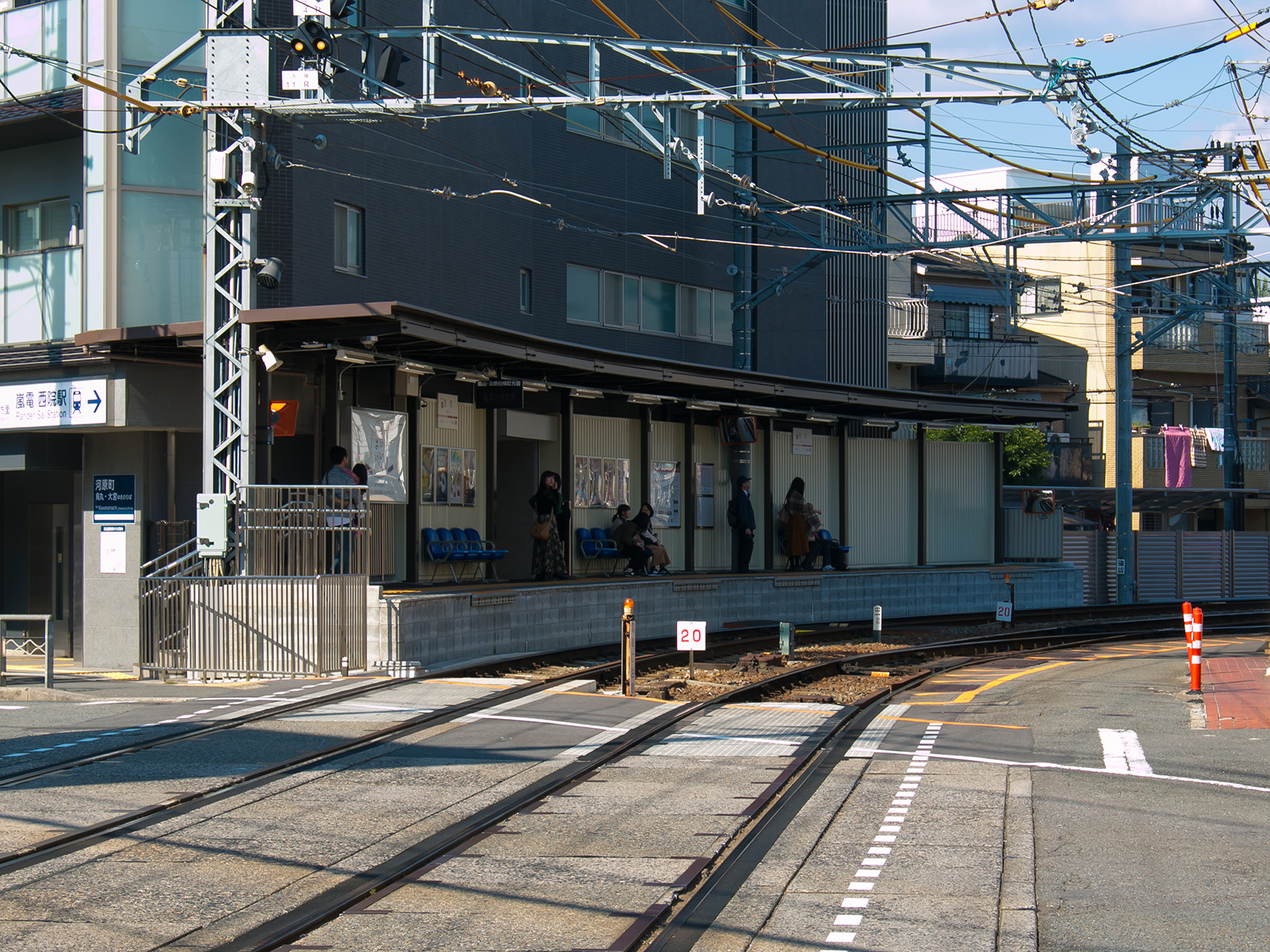

General information
- Location: Nakagyō-ku, Kyoto, Kyoto; Japan
- Operator: Keifuku Electric Railroad
- Line: Randen Arashiyama Line
- Platforms: 2
- Tracks: 2

Construction
- Structure type: At-grade

Other information
- Station code: A2

History
- Opened: 1910

Passengers
- FY2015: 1.7 million
Location

Hankyu Saiin Station (西院駅, Saiin-eki) is a train station along the Hankyu Railway Kyoto Line.

== Location ==
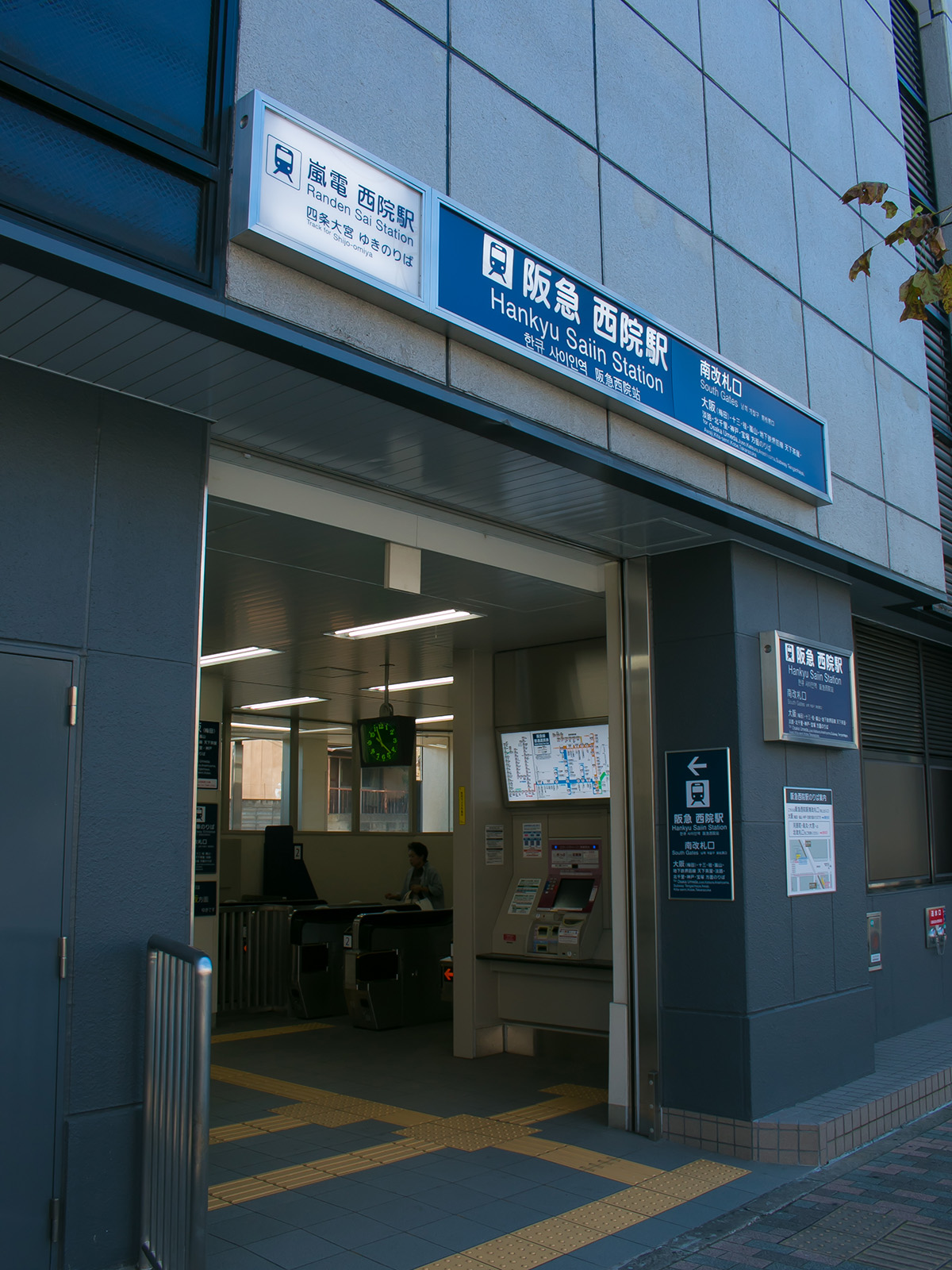
Hankyu Saiin Station Entrance

Saiin station's secondary entrance is situated on the southwest corner of Shijo street and Nishioji street in Kyoto, Kyoto Prefecture, Japan. Saiin Station is located in Saiin Kōzanji-chō, Ukyō-ku, Kyoto.

== Service ==
Saiin Station is serviced by local (普通, futsū), semi express (準急, junkyū), rapid express (快速急行, kaisoku kyūkō), and "commuter" limited express (通勤特急, tsūkin tokkyū) trains, while limited express (特急, tokkyū) trains do not service the station.

== Usage ==
In fiscal 2015, the Hankyu station was used by 16,087,000 passengers annually (both exiting and entering passengers). Over the same year, the Randen station was used by 1,674,000 passengers annually (both exiting and entering passengers). For historical data, see the table below.

Hankyu
Fiscal year	Annual total (in thousands)	
Fiscal year	Boarding	Total
2001	8,055	16,569
2002	7,869	15,990
2003	7,799	15,923
2004	7,629	15,665
2005	7,755	15,737
2006	7,691	15,483
2007	7,935	15,810
2008	8,394	16,697
2009	7,554	15,698
2010	7,619	15,376
2011	7,595	15,436
2012	7,667	15,494
2015	7,993	16,087

== Attractions ==
=== Dining ===
A variety of quaint restaurants, izakaya, and fast food locations lie within short walking distance of the station.

=== Retail ===
A few large retail outlets and a variety of small shops line the streets surrounding Saiin Station. A 100 yen shuttle bus stops in front of Saiin Station and carries passengers directly to the retail area.

There are many convenience stores within a 2 or 3 minute walk of Saiin Station.

=== Hotels ===
The Rhino hotel is located directly beside Saiin Station.

=== Historical sites ===
Kōzan-ji, a small Buddhist temple, is located directly across from Saiin Station, on the northeast corner of Nishioji Street and Shijo Street, less than one-minute walking distance.

=== Gaming ===
Several pachinko parlors are located within walking distance of Saiin Station.

== History ==
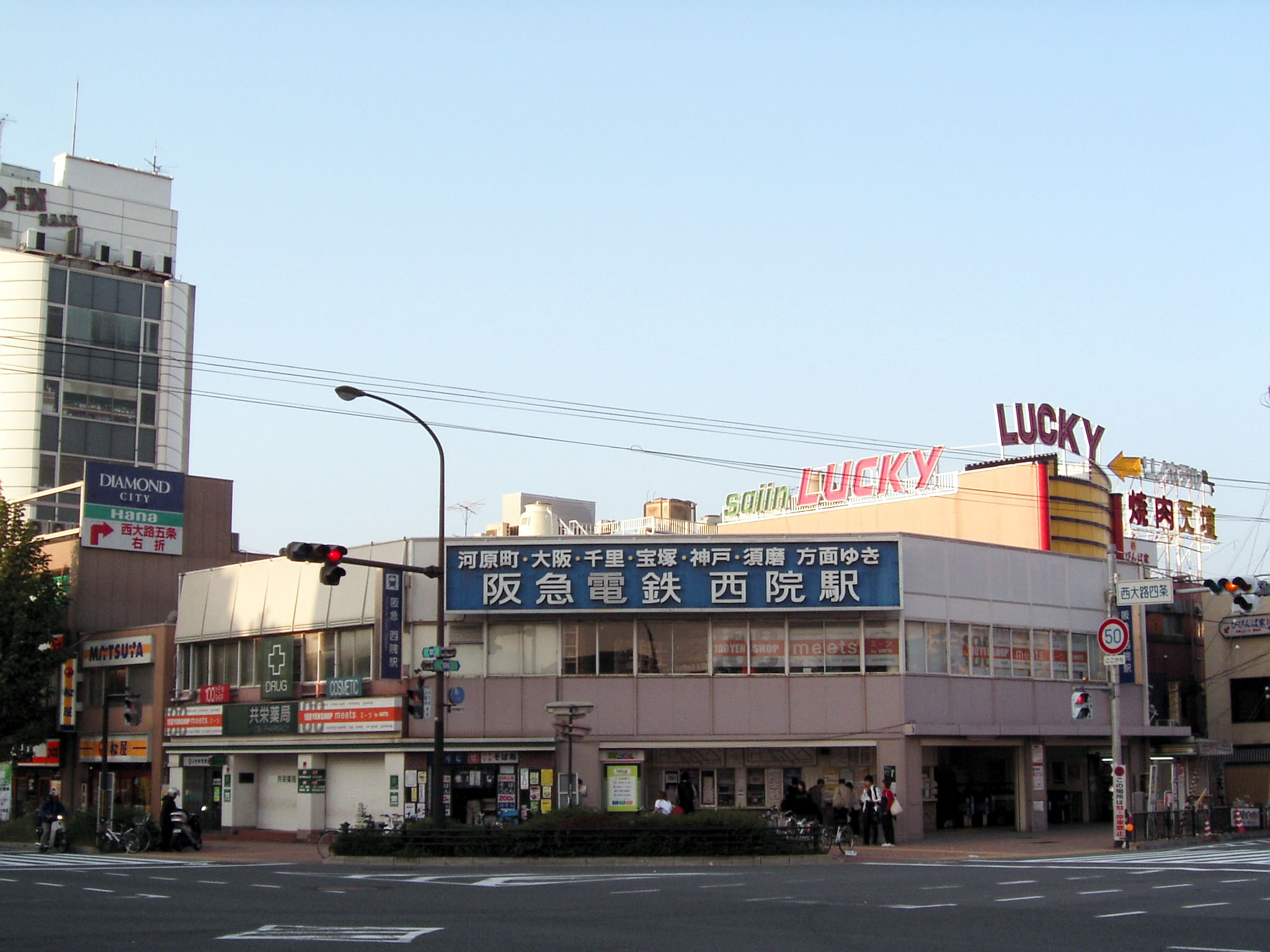
Hankyu Saiin Station (2006)

Saiin Station opened as Kyoto Saiin Station (京都西院駅, Kyōto-Saiin-eki) on 1 November 1928. At the time of opening, the station was the terminus of the Shinkeihan Railway, a former operator of the Hankyu Kyoto Line. On 31 March 1931, when the underground extension from Saiin to Keihan Kyoto Station (present-day Ōmiya Station) was completed, the station was moved from the ground level to the underground facilities and renamed Saiin Station.

Station numbering was introduced to all Hankyu stations on 21 December 2013 with this station being designated as station number HK-83.

At the time of the construction, a plan was tabled to link Saiin Station with the smaller and older Sai Station (located one-minute walking distance east on Shijo street) by means of an underground path, but the plan was eventually scrapped, due to strong opposition from people living in the area. The underground path was under construction until 2017.

== Adjacent stations ==
«	Service	»
Hankyu Railway Kyoto Line
Nishi-Kyōgoku	Local	Ōmiya
Nishi-Kyōgoku	Semi-Express	Ōmiya
Nishi-Kyōgoku	Rapid Service	Ōmiya
Katsura	Semi limited Express	Ōmiya
Limited Express: Does not stop at this station
Katsura	Commuter Limited Express	Ōmiya
Rapid Limited Express "Kyo-Train", "Ogura": Does not stop at this station
Rapid Limited Express A "Kyo-Train": Does not stop at this station
Randen Arashiyama Line
Shijō-Ōmiya	-	Nishiōji-Sanjō
