= Kyoto Municipal Subway 10 series =

Japanese train type

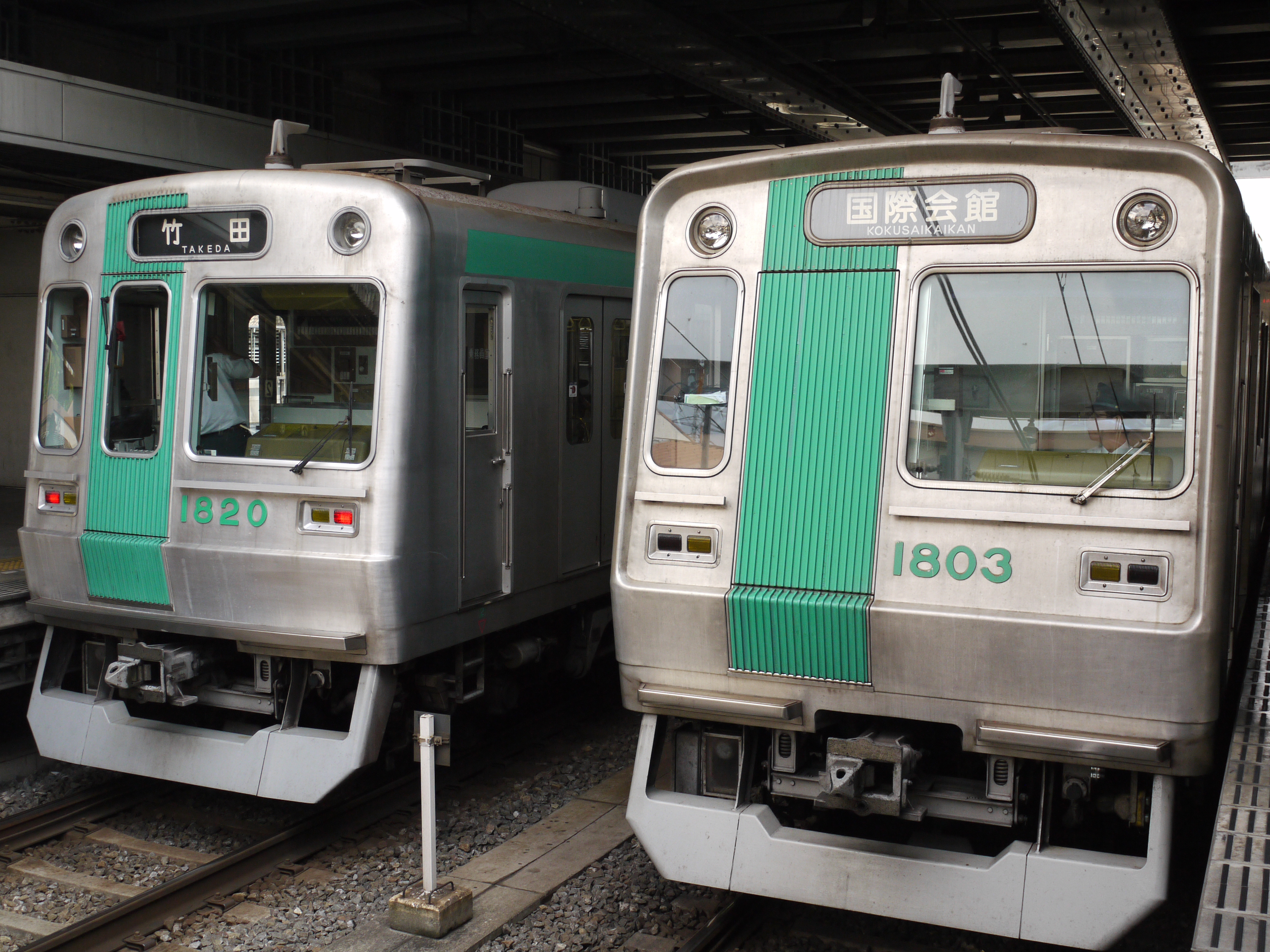
- Two 10 series trains with differences between the 6th batch (left) and 1st batch (right)
- In service: 1981–present
- Manufacturer: Kinki Sharyo
- Scrapped: 2020–present
- Number built: 120 vehicles (20 sets)
- Number in service: 72 vehicles (12 sets)
- Number scrapped: 48 vehicles (8 sets)
- Successor: 20 series
- Formation: 6 cars per trainset
- Fleet numbers: 1x01–1x20
- Capacity: 144 (intermediate cars); 130 (end cars)
- Operators: Kyoto Municipal Subway
- Lines served: Karasuma Line; Kintetsu Nara Line; Kintetsu Kyoto Line

Specifications
- Car body construction: Aluminum alloy
- Car length: 20,500 mm (67 ft 3 in)
- Width: 2,872 mm (9 ft 5.1 in)
- Height: 4,040 mm (13 ft 3 in)
- Doors: 4 pairs per side
- Maximum speed: 105 km/h (65 mph)
- Acceleration: 3.3 km/(h⋅s) (2.1 mph/s)
- Deceleration: 3.5 km/(h⋅s) (2.2 mph/s)
- Electric system(s): 1,500 V DC overhead line
- Current collection: Pantograph
- UIC classification: Bo′Bo′+Bo′Bo′+2′2′+2′2′+Bo′Bo′+Bo′Bo′
- Track gauge: 1,435 mm (4 ft 8 1/2 in) standard gauge

The Kyoto Municipal Subway 10 series (京都市交通局10系電車), is an electric multiple unit (EMU) commuter train type operated by the Kyoto Municipal Subway in Kyoto, Japan, since 1981.

== Overview ==
The 10 series was introduced in 1981 with nine four-car sets built to coincide with the opening of the Karasuma Line between Kyoto and Kitaoji stations. By 1997, the line was extended south to Takeda Station and north to Kokusaikaikan Station. These extensions were accompanied by an additional 84 cars spread over five batches.

== Formations ==
=== Four-car sets ===
Nine four car sets were introduced for the opening of the initial section on the Karasuma Line between Kyōto Station and Kitaōji Station in May 1981.

Designation	Mc2'	M1'	M1	Mc2
Numbering	18xx	17xx	12xx	11xx

=== Six-car sets ===
Starting from the third batch in 1988, all trains were lengthened to six-car trains. This was done to supplement the opening of an extension between Kyoto Station and Takeda Station.

Designation	Mc2'	M1'	T2	T1	M1	Mc2
Numbering	18xx	17xx	16xx	13xx	12xx	11xx

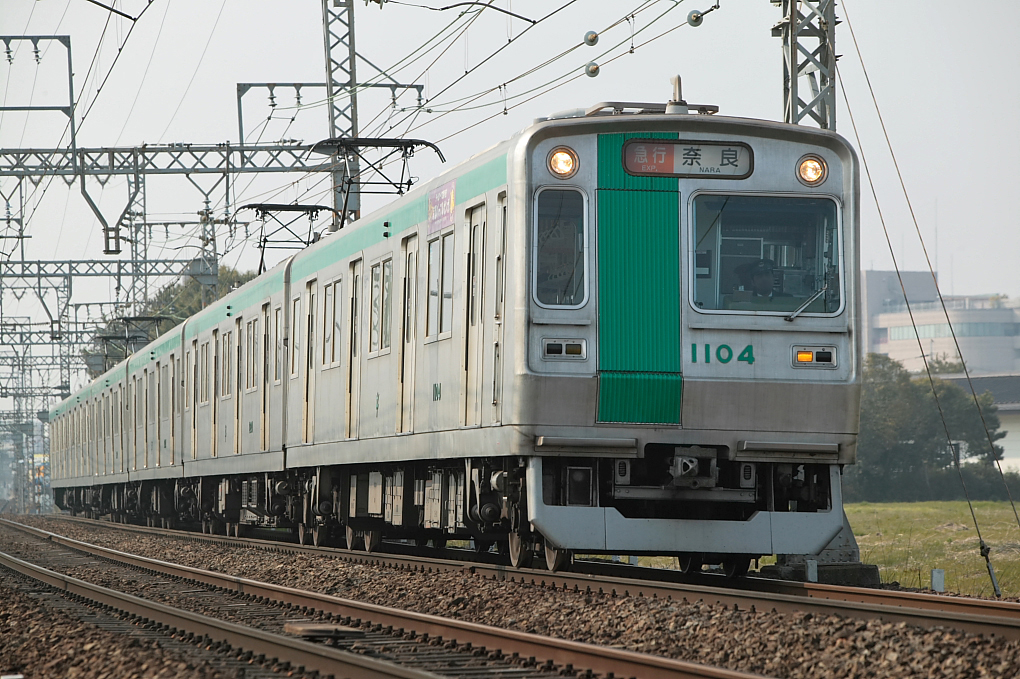
Original model trainset

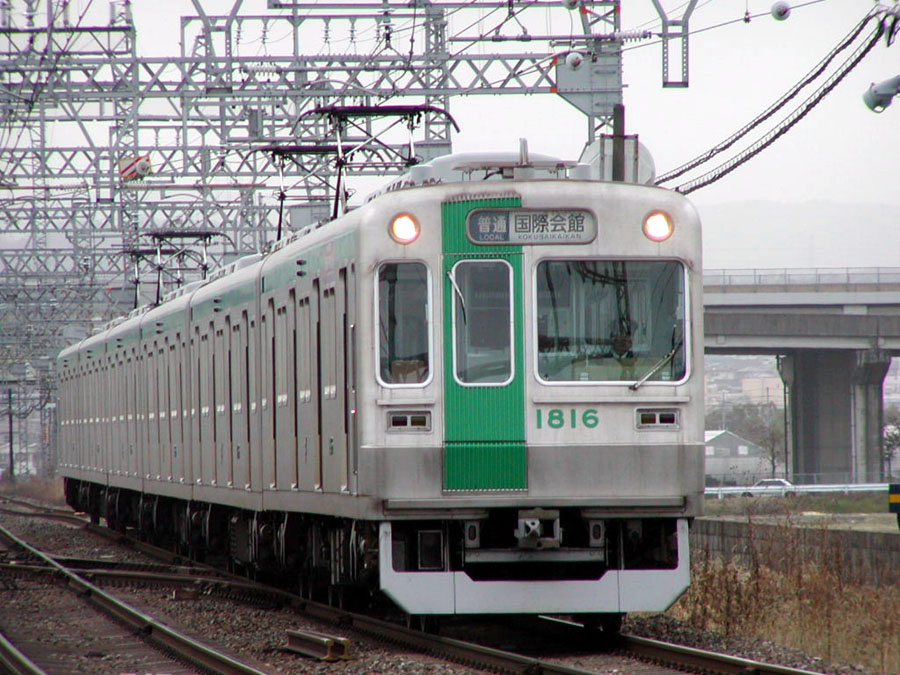
Updated model trainset starting from the third batch

== Interior ==
The interior consists of longitudinal seating throughout.

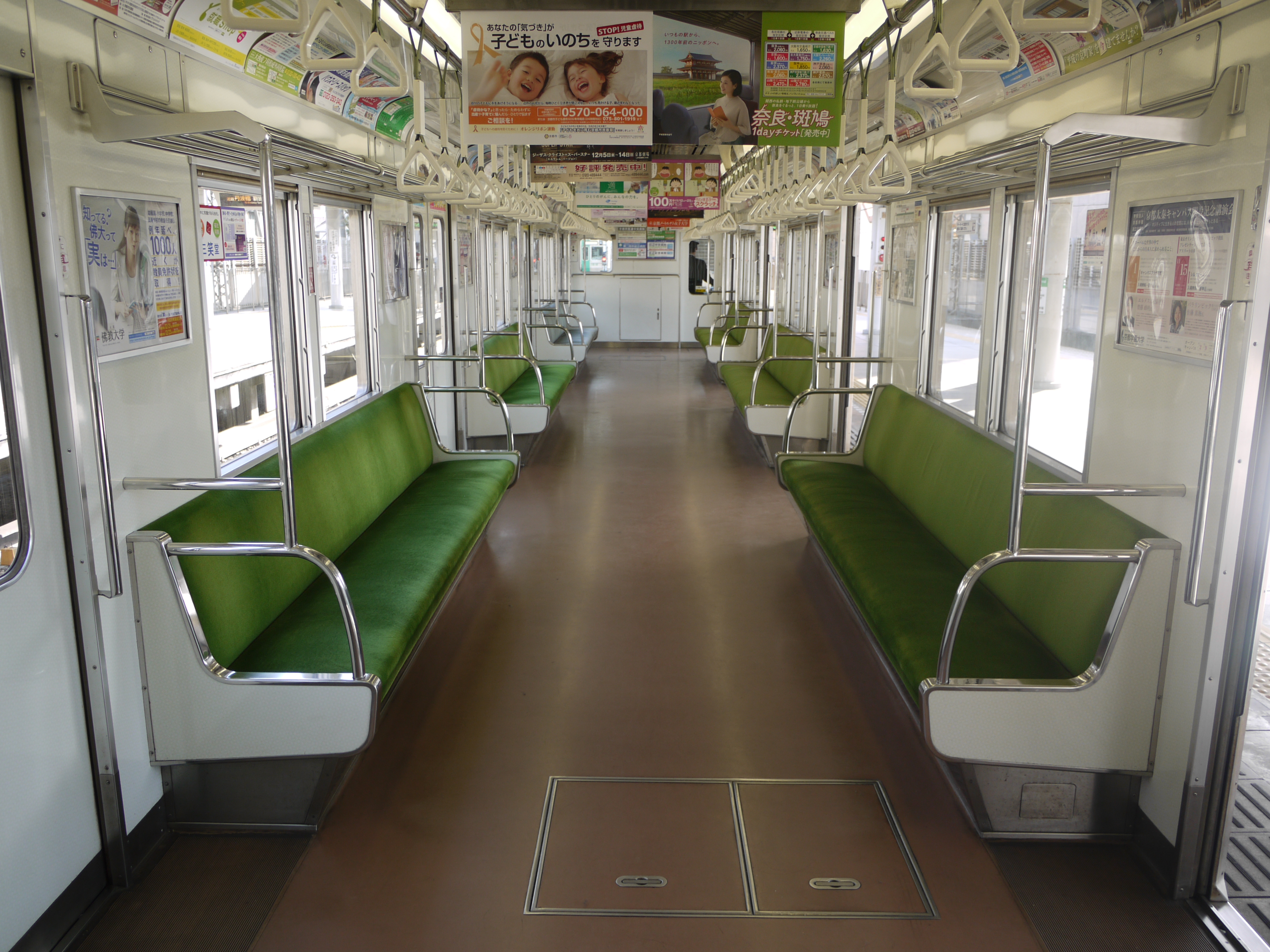
Interior view

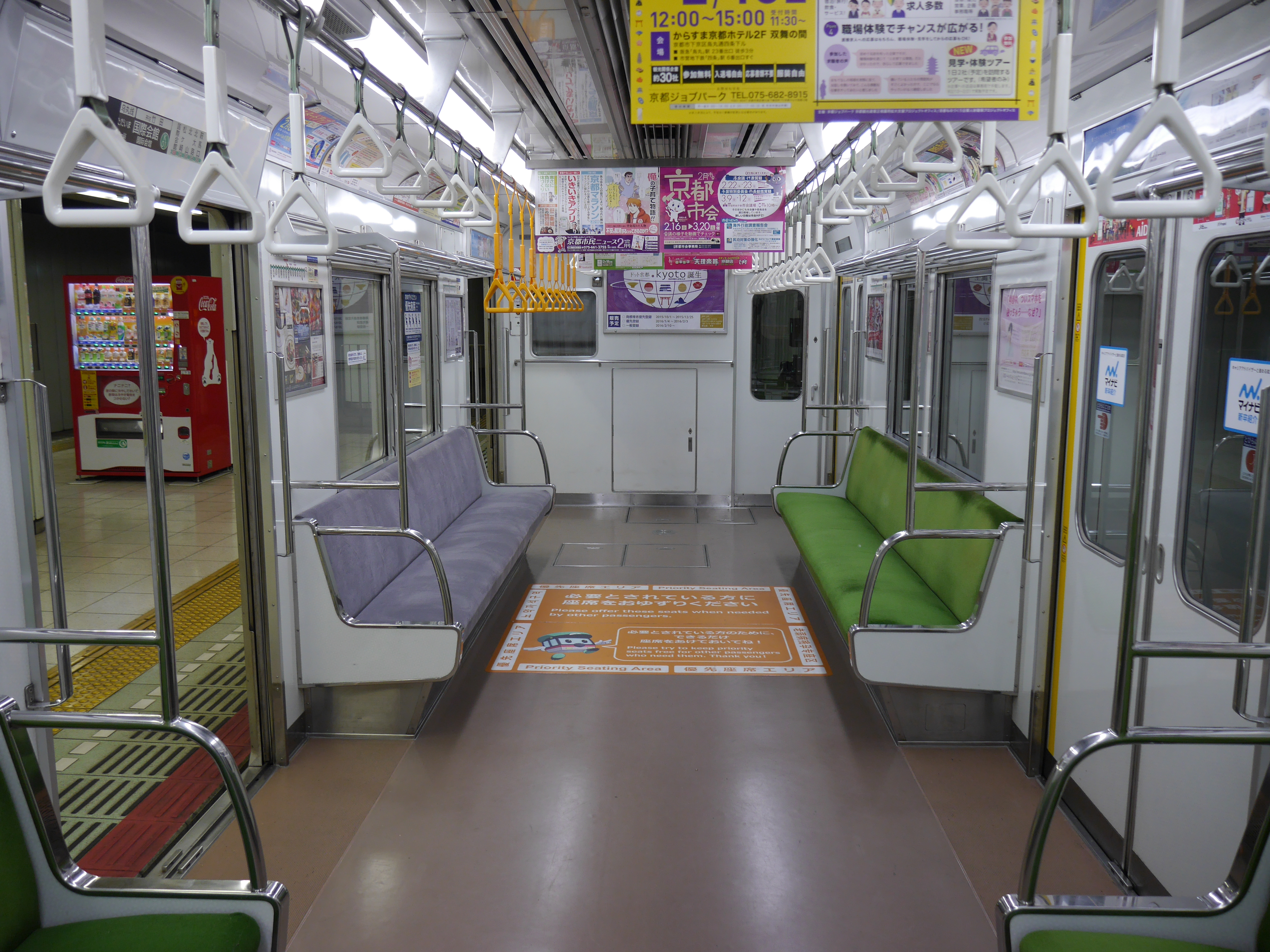
Priority seating area after refurbishment

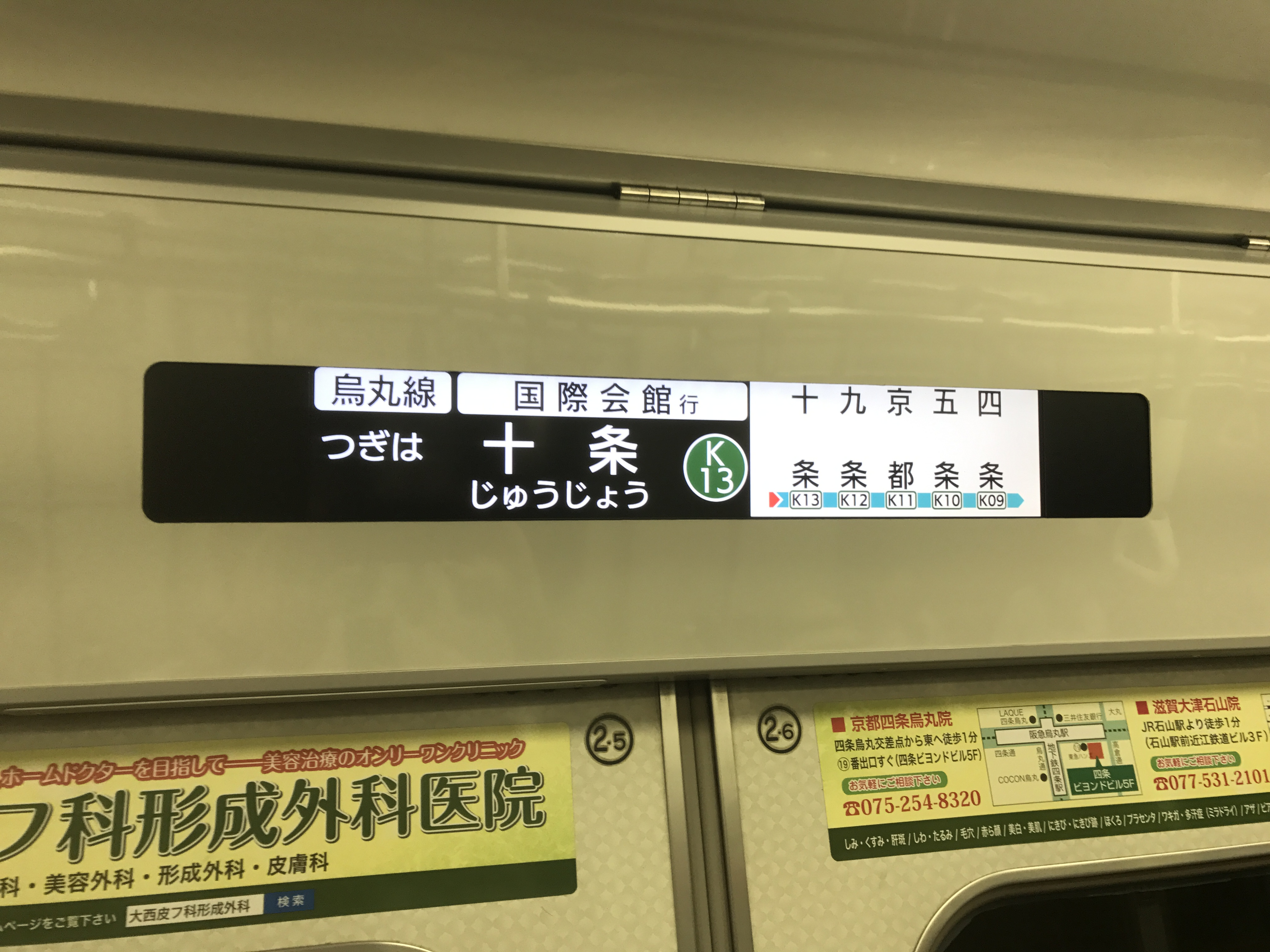
LCD screens installed after refurbishment

== Disposal ==
Set 1806 was scrapped in 2020. The remaining eight earlier-batch sets are set to undergo replacement as newer Kyoto Municipal Subway 20 series trains enter service.

Among the nine sets put into service when the Karasuma Line first opened for service, 1808 is the last remaining one in operation as of August 2025.
