= Hata no Kawakatsu =

Government official in the Asuka period in Japan

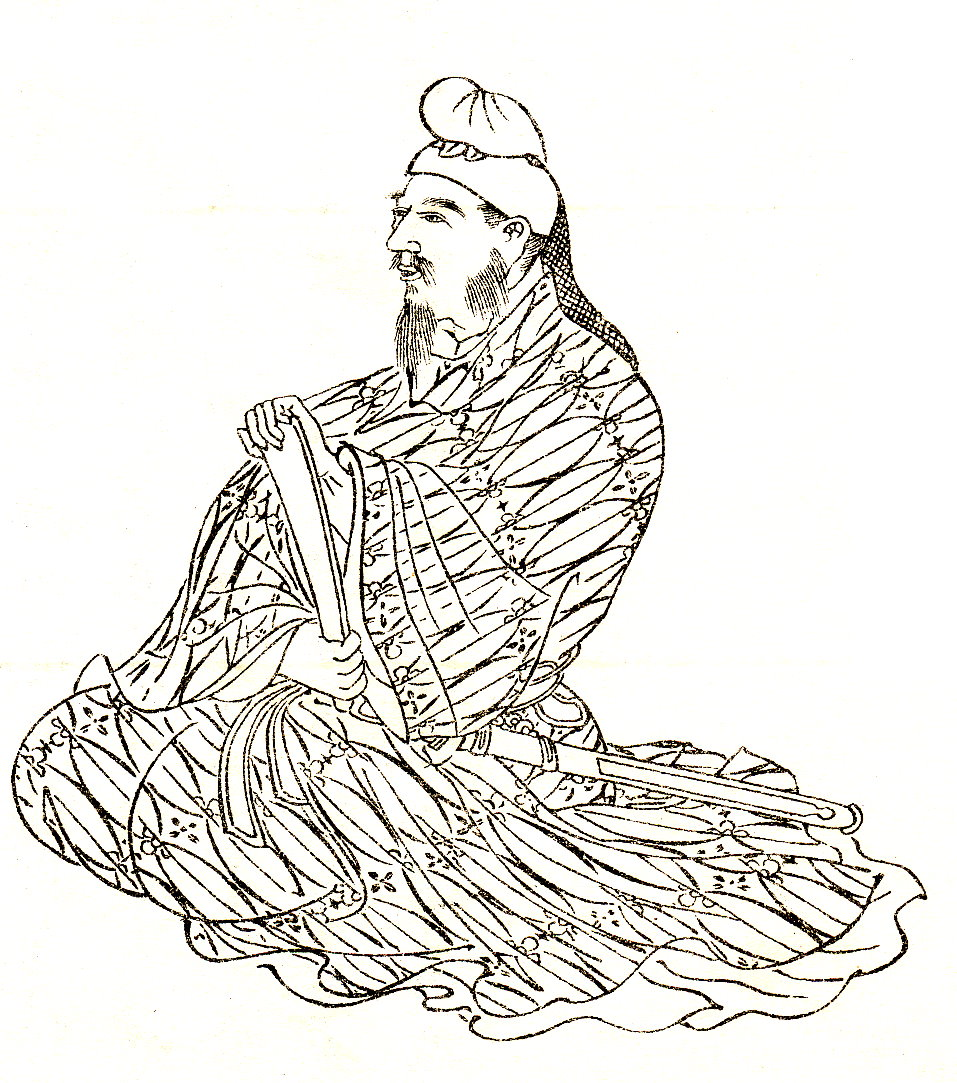
- A nineteenth century portrait of Hata no Kawakatsu from Zenken Kojitsu by Kikuchi Yōsai.
- Native name: 秦河勝
- Occupation: politician
- Period: Kofun - Asuka

Hata no Kawakatsu (秦河勝, alternatively read as Hada no Kōkatsu), or Hata no Miyatsuko no Kawakatsu (秦造河勝 (Note: Miyatsuko (造) being a hereditary title roughly equivalent to "chief".)), was a semi-legendary statesman active during the Asuka period in Japan. He is recorded as serving under Empress Suiko and Empress Kōgyoku in the Nihon Shoki, and appears as a noteworthy figure in narratives surrounding Prince Shōtoku.

Later legends present Kawakatsu as the reincarnation of Emperor Qin Shi Huang, in addition to being the ancestor of the Hata clan and the founder of sarugaku. He is also credited with the construction of Kōryū-ji in Kyoto, and is enshrined as the deity Ōsake Daimyōjin (大避大明神) at the Ōsake Shrine in Akō.

== Family ==
Kawakatsu belonged to the Hata clan, an immigrant group that settled in Japan during the fourth and fifth centuries. They were particularly influential within the Kadono district of what is now Kyoto, and played a significant part in the formation of Japan's political and religious institutions. Furthermore, the Hata were renowned for being skilled weavers, brewers and construction workers, credited with the introduction of technologies such as sericulture.

Various origins have been attributed to the Hata clan over time, with the Nihon Shoki recording that Yuzuki no Kimi, alongside 120 members of his clan (i.e. the Hata), settled in Japan from Baekje during the reign of Emperor Ōjin. Alternatively, the Shinsen Shōjiroku states that the Hata were descended from Emperor Qin Shi Huang, linking the name Hata (秦) to the Qin dynasty (秦). Despite this, it is agreed by most modern scholars that the Hata clan was of Korean origin, having arrived in Japan from Silla.

Although little is known concerning Kawakatsu's direct family, the noh playwright Zeami Motokiyo claimed to be a distant descendant of his, even referring to himself as Hata no Motokiyo (秦元清). In his work the Fūshikaden (風姿花伝; "Transmission of the Flower Through Forms"), Zeami goes on to assert that the leaders of the Konparu troupe can trace their ancestry back to Hata no Ujiyasu (秦氏安), a descendant of Kawakatsu, who inherited the art of sarugaku and performed alongside his brother-in-law Ki no Gonnokami (紀権守). Together the two are also credited with establishing the three performances (Note: Inatsumi no okina (稲積の翁, corresponding to the Okina omote (翁面)), Yonatsumi no okina (代継の翁, corresponding to the Sanban sarugaku (三番申楽)) and Chichi no Jō (父助).) of Shiki-sanban (式三番; "The Three Ceremonies").

Much like Zeami, the musicians of Shitennō-ji likewise claimed to be descendants of Kawakatsu, and by extension Qin Shi Huang.

== Career ==
=== Nihon Shoki ===
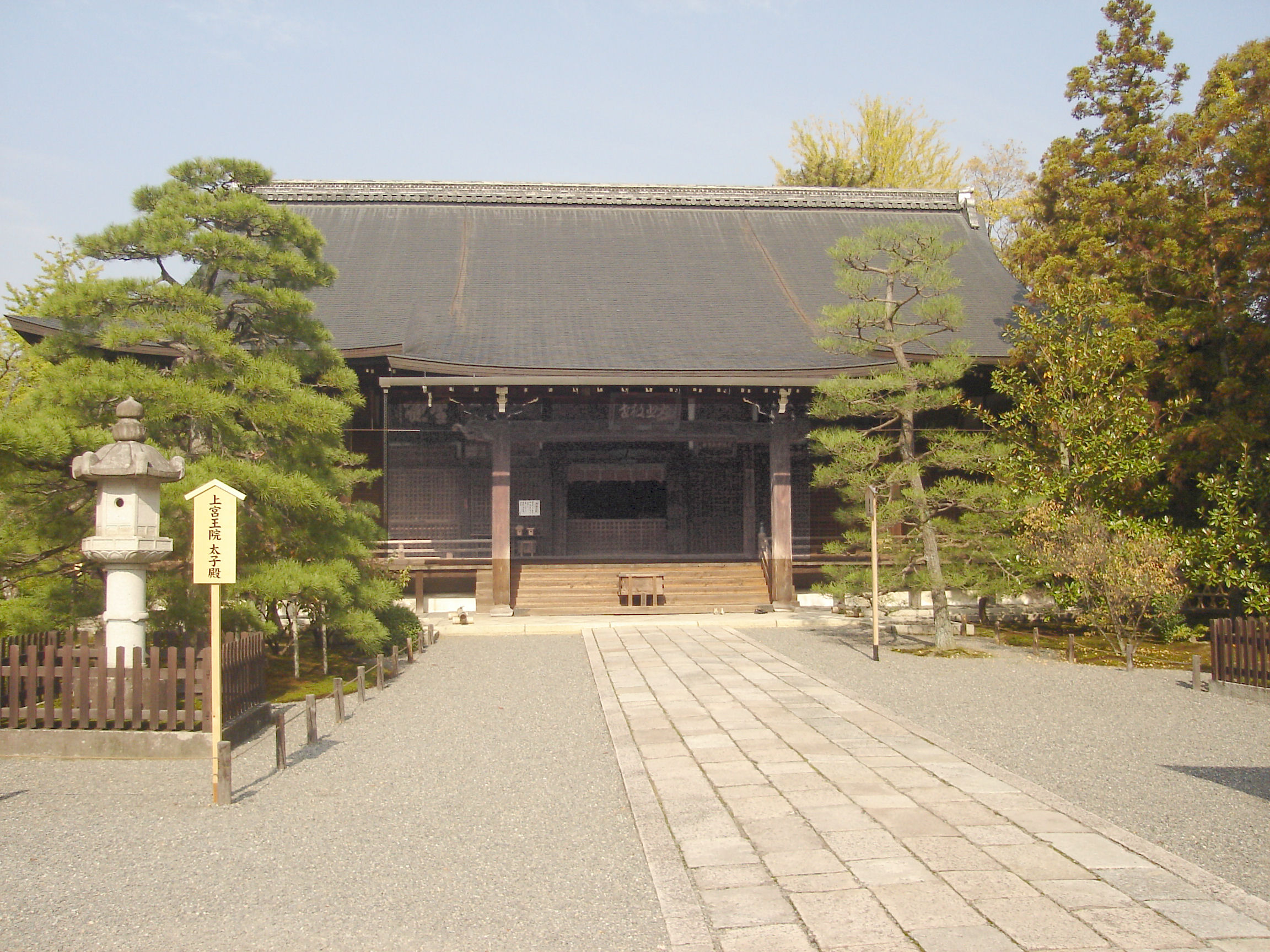
Kōryū-ji, a Shingon temple in the district of Uzumasa (Ukyō ward, Kyoto).

The Nihon Shoki makes only sparse references to Hata no Kawakatsu, providing no record of his birth or death, but acknowledges him as a high-ranking courtier (大夫, taifu) who served Empress Suiko and Empress Kōgyoku. He is first mentioned in the eleventh year of Empress Suiko's reign (603 CE) as founding a temple called Hachioka-dera (蜂岡寺), also known as Kōryū-ji, after receiving a statue of the Buddha as a gift from Prince Shōtoku.

The Prince Imperial addressed all the high functionaries, saying: “I have an image of the venerable Buddha. Which of you will receive this image and worship it reverently?” Now Hata no Miyatsuko no Kawakatsu came forward and said: “Thy servant will worship it.” So he received the image of Buddha, and built for it the Temple of Hachioka.

In the eighteenth year of Empress Suiko's reign (610 CE), Kawakatsu was tasked with escorting a group of envoys from Silla, aided by another servant named Haji no Muraji Usagi (土師連菟). Together with Hashihito no Muraji Shiofuta (間人連臨蓋) and Abe no Omi Ōko (阿閉臣大籠) accompanying a group from Mimana, the envoys were brought before the south gate of the imperial court.

Kawakatsu was also responsible for putting an end to the self-destructive worship of a "faddish deity" (流行神, hayarigami), named Tokoyo-no-Kami (常世の神; "God of the Everlasting World"), in the third year of Empress Kōgyoku's reign (644 CE).

A certain Ōfube no Ō, from the neighborhood of the Fuji river in the east, urged his fellow-villagers to worship an insect, saying: “This is the God of the Everlasting World. Those who worship this God will have long life and riches.” At length the priests and priestesses, feigning divine inspiration, said: “Those who worship the God of the Everlasting World will, if poor, become rich, and, if old, will become young again.” So they more and more persuaded the people to cast out the valuables of their houses, and to set out by the roadside sake, vegetables, and the six domestic animals. (Note: Horse, cow, sheep, pig, dog and chicken.) They were then made to shout: “The new riches have come!” Both in the country and in the capital people took the insect of the Everlasting World and, placing it in a sanctified spot, with song and dance invoked happiness. They threw away their treasures, but to no purpose whatsoever. The loss and waste was extreme. Hereupon Hata no Miyatsuko no Kawakatsu of Kadono was angered that the people should be so deluded, and struck down Ōfube no Ō. The priests and priestesses were intimidated, and ceased to persuade people to this worship.

It is said that the people of that time then made a song, saying:

Uzumasa (Note: Referring to Hata no Kawakatsu.)
Has executed
The God of the Everlasting World
Who we were told
Was the very God of Gods. (Note: 「太秦は 神とも神と 聞え來る 常世の神を 打ち懲ますも」)

The Nihon Shoki further states that the "Insect of the Everlasting World" (常世の虫, Tokoyo no Mushi) resembled a silkworm, over four inches in length and about as thick as a thumb. It had a green coloration with black spots, and lived on tachibana and hosoki (曼椒; "creeping pepper" (Note: Probably refers to the Japanese prickly-ash.)) trees. Based on this description it is theorized that the insect in question may have been the caterpillar of a Swallowtail butterfly, specifically P. xuthus, given that they feed on both Citrus and Zanthoxylum.

=== Shōtoku Taishi Denryaku ===
Kawakatsu is acknowledged as having close ties to Prince Shōtoku in the Shōtoku Taishi Denryaku (聖徳太子伝暦; "Biography of Prince Shōtoku"), compiled in the tenth century, which records his name as Hata no Miyatsuko no Kawakatsu (秦造川勝).

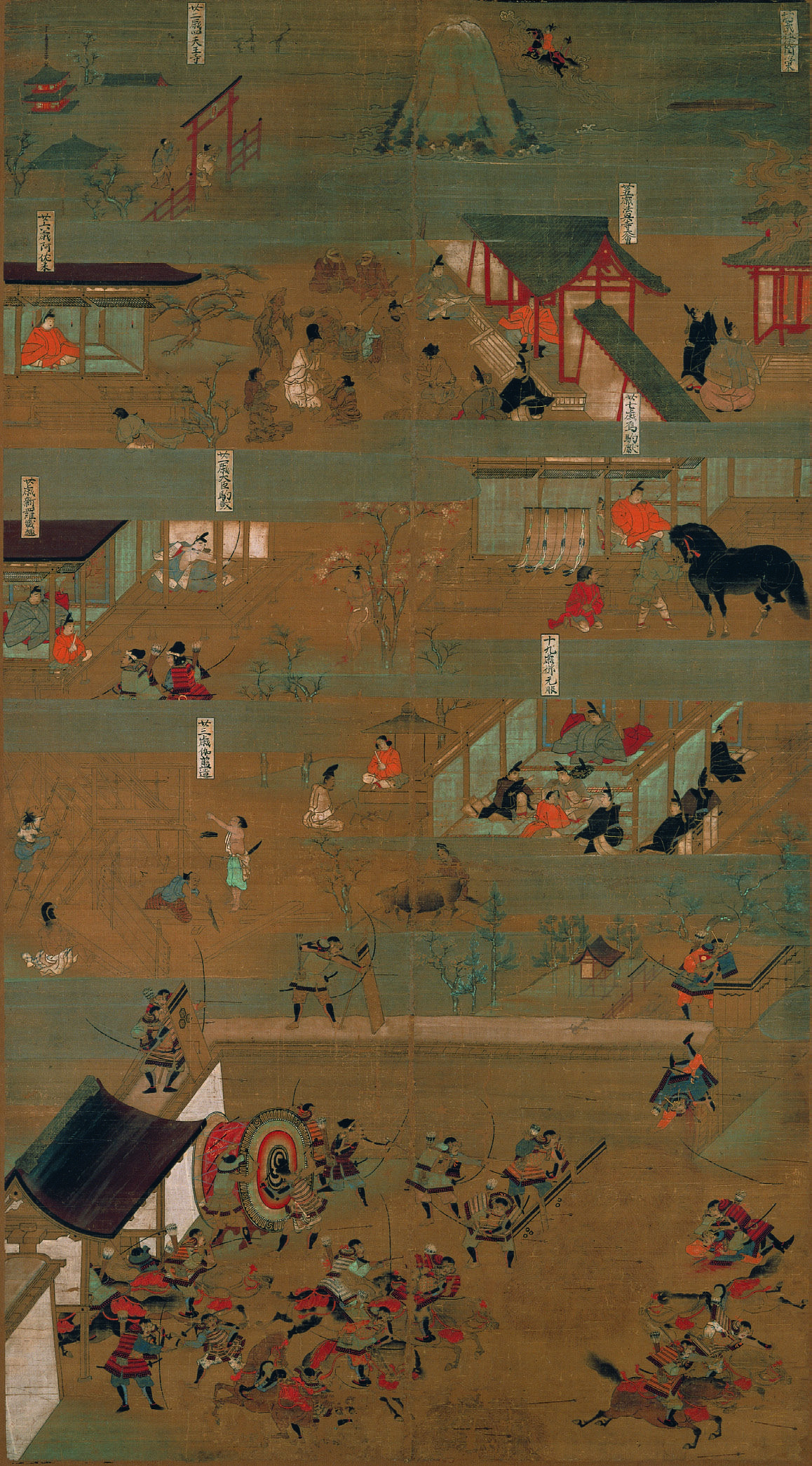
A scroll from the "Illustrated Biography of Prince Shōtoku" (聖徳太子絵伝, Shōtoku Taishi Eden) owned by Shitennō-ji.

It is written that, when Prince Shōtoku was sixteen years old, Kawakatsu served as the head of his army during the Battle of Shigisan. In an effort to secure victory, Prince Shōtoku commanded Kawakatsu to carve statues of the Four Heavenly Kings out of Chinese sumac (白膠, nude). Raising the statues over his head (or alternatively at the army's vanguard), Prince Shōtoku then vowed: “If I am granted victory, I will build a temple in honor of the Four Heavenly Kings who protect the world.” This temple being Shitennō-ji.

During the battle, Kawakatsu was also responsible for beheading the rebel Mononobe no Moriya:

At this moment, the Ōmuraji [Mononobe no Moriya] climbed a large enoki tree. (...) He swore an oath and released the arrow of the Mononobe clan's ancestral deity (府都の大明神, Futo no Daimyōjin), which struck the prince’s armor. The prince then ordered his attendant, Tomi no Ichii, to shoot the arrow of the Four Heavenly Kings. (His bow was steady and calm, his arrow swift and true.) The arrow struck the Ōmuraji in the chest, causing him to fall headlong from the tree. While the rebel forces fell into chaos, Kawakatsu severed the Ōmuraji’s head.

When Prince Shōtoku was thirty three years old he addressed Kawakatsu about a dream he had, in which he traveled north to a beautiful village and attended a feast held by Kawakatsu's relatives. Kawakatsu himself confirmed that his village was exactly as the prince observed in his dream, and so the two departed for the village the following day.

The next day, they arrived at Uji Bridge, and Kawakatsu's family, dressed in robes and mounted on horseback, came to greet them at the head of the bridge, filling the road with their presence.

The prince then spoke to his attendants, saying:

“The relatives of the Han people (漢人, Ayahito) are wealthy, and their hand-woven silk garments are exquisite. These are the nation's treasures.”

When they reached the district of Uki, Kawakatsu and his kin presented them with a banquet. Around two hundred attendants, including servants, drank without tiring. The prince was so pleased that he spent the day lodging by a large dam in Kaedeno. A temporary residence was built at the foot of Hachioka (蜂岡) and completed in just a few days.

The building was later converted into a temple and given to Kawakatsu, in addition to 30 chō (町; approx. 0.99 hectares) of rice fields in front of the temple and 60 chō of mountains and fields behind the temple. He also received items such as Buddhist statues and banners that had been donated by the King of Silla.

According to another biography produced in 1666, Prince Shōtoku's horse, the Black Steed of Kai (甲斐の黒駒, Kai no Kurokoma), was chosen from among a thousand horses that were gathered as a gift from Hata no Kawakatsu.

== Legends ==
=== Fūshikaden ===
While Hata no Kawakatsu was merely presented as a courtly figure in the Nihon Shoki, the Kōryū-ji traditions asserted his identity as the semi-divine reincarnation of Emperor Qin Shi Huang. This is reflected in the Fūshikaden (風姿花伝), a treatise on noh drama written in the early fifteenth century by Zeami Motokiyo, which provides a legendary account of Kawakatsu's life, alongside other narratives concerning the origins and transmission of sarugaku. According to the Fūshikaden, Kawakatsu not only served under the emperors Kinmei, Bidatsu, Yōmei and Sushun, in addition to Empress Suiko and Prince Shōtoku, but was also the supernatural progenitor of the Hata clan.

In Japan, during the reign of Emperor Kinmei, a flood occurred in the Hatsuse River in the province of Yamato, and a jar flowed down from the upper reaches of that river. A high-ranking court official picked up the jar next to the cedar torii gate at Miwa Shrine. Inside was a jewel-like infant with a tender expression. As this must have been someone descended from heaven, the noble reported the event to the throne. In the emperor’s dream that night, the infant said: “I am the reincarnation of the emperor Shi Huang of the Qin dynasty in China. I have a karmic relation to the Land of the Rising Sun, and thus I have appeared here now.” The emperor thought this to be a marvel and summoned the infant to the court. As the child grew to maturity, he was exceptionally intelligent; by the age of fifteen he rose to the rank of minister. Because the Chinese character qin (秦) is pronounced hada in Japanese, he was given the name Hada no Kōkatsu (秦河勝).

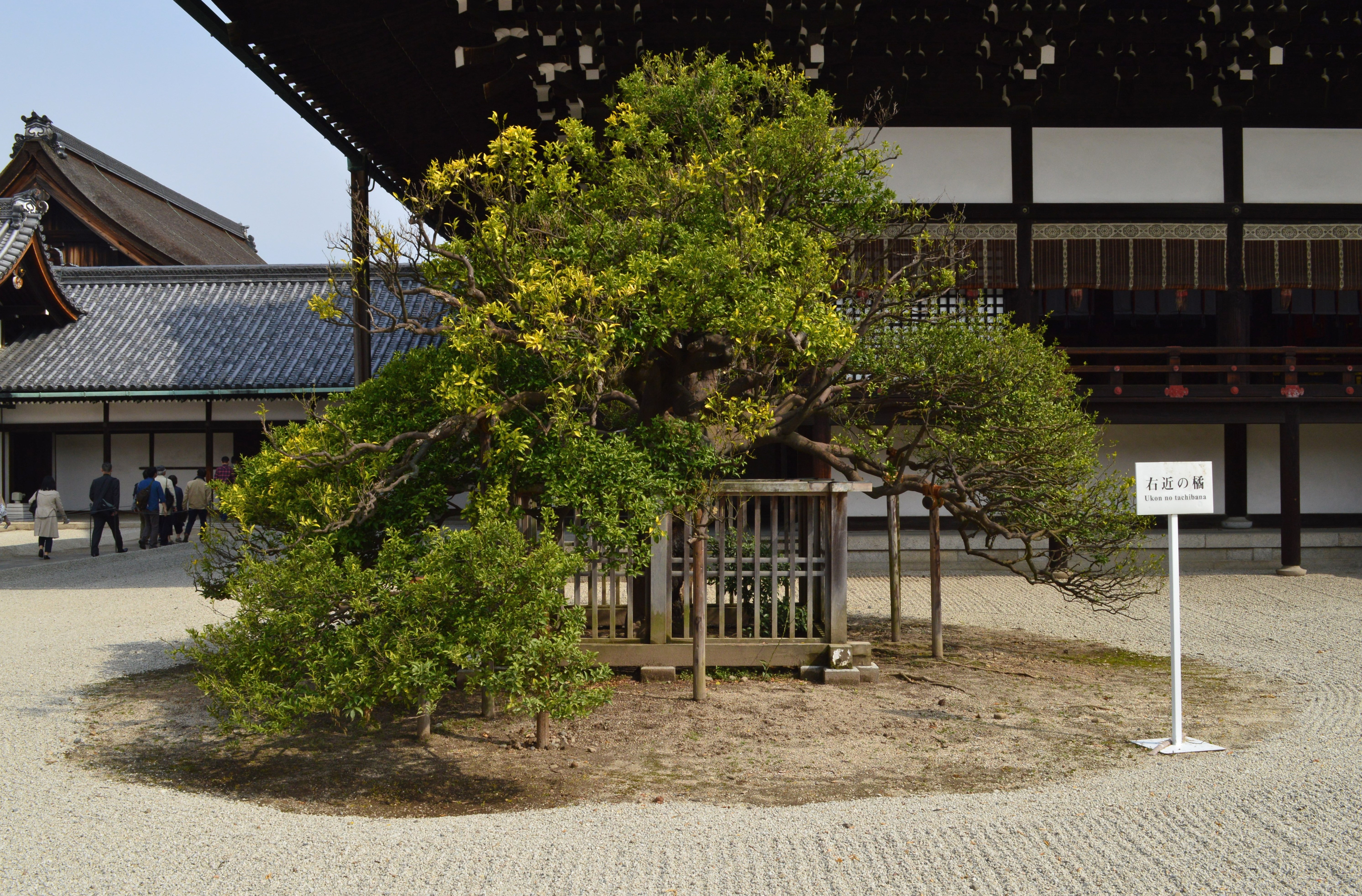
The Ukon no Tachibana (右近橘) located outside the Hall for State Ceremonies (紫宸殿, Shishinden) at the Kyoto Imperial Palace. According to the Gōdanshō (江談抄), the site was said to have formerly been the residence of Hata no Kawakatsu.

Following this, the Fūshikaden also credits Kawakatsu and Prince Shōtoku with the founding of sarugaku:

Once, during a time of great disturbances in the country, Prince Jōgū (Note: (上宮太子, Jōgū Taishi) Another name for Prince Shōtoku.) put his trust in the ancient examples from the Age of the Gods and from the Land of the Buddha, and commanded this Kōkatsu to perform sixty-six pieces of role-play, while he himself carved sixty-six masks for Kōkatsu to wear. Kōkatsu performed the pieces at the Hall for State Ceremonies (紫宸殿, Shishinden) in the Tachibana Palace. The country was soon brought under control and peace again reigned. Prince Jōgū handed down these performances for the sake of later generations. (...) The performance was thus given the name sarugaku (申楽).

Kawakatsu, wishing to leave no trace of his manifestation (化人, kenin), is then said to have set out from Naniwa Bay, in the province of Settsu, aboard a "hollow ship" (うつぼ舟, utsubo-bune). Entrusting himself to the wind, he sailed across the western sea and eventually arrived at Sakoshi Bay in the province of Harima.

When the people of this bay pulled the boat to land, his shape had changed from that of a human being. He began to possess and haunt all the people of the area, and to cause strange omens. The people thereupon began to worship him as a god, and the province prospered. They named him Taikō Daimyōjin (大荒大明神), writing this with the characters meaning “greatly violent” (大きに荒るる, ōkini araruru). Even today he is astonishingly responsive to prayers, and his true essence (本地, honji) is that of the Heavenly King Bishamonten. It is said that when Prince Jōgū quelled the rebellion of Moriya, he used this god’s power to defeat his enemies.

Taikō Daimyōjin is also identified as Ōsake Daimyōjin (大避大明神), a deified form of Hata no Kawakatsu enshrined at the Ōsake Shrine in the town of Sakoshi (Akō).

=== Ikishima ===
A local legend from Sakoshi speaks of how Kawakatsu arrived at the bay by boat in 644, fleeing prosecution from the Soga clan. After his death, the Ōsake Shrine was subsequently built to appease Kawakatsu's spirit, with the nearby island of Ikishima, which belongs to the precincts of the Ōsake Shrine, claimed to be his final resting place.

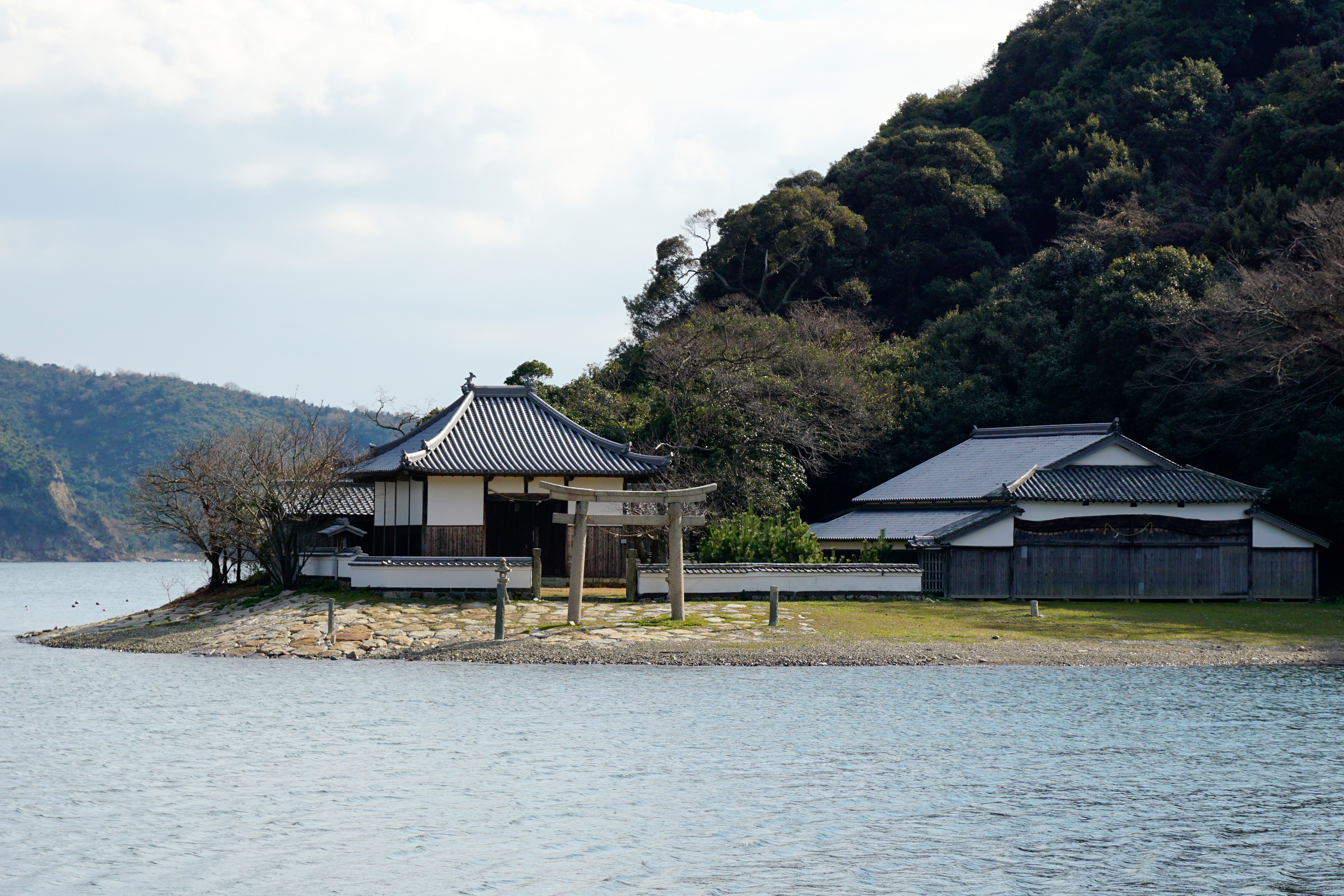
The otabisho of the Ōsake Shrine on the island of Ikishima in Sakoshi (Akō). An alleged "Grave of Hata no Kawakatsu" (秦河勝の墓) is also located on the island.

Hata no Kawakatsu was the person who built the temple of Kōryū-ji in Kyoto. He also contributed to the founding of Kyūchū Kagura (宮中神楽; a type of Japanese orchestra played at the palace), and the establishment the financial system of the government. Prince Shōtoku thought much of him, but after Prince Shotoku passed away in 622, he was prosecuted by the Soga family, a powerful rival family. Then, in 644, he escaped by a ship and drifted to the Sakoshi Bay. The place he arrived was the island of Ikishima. Later, he cultivated around the Chikusa River. While he was at Sakoshi, people warmly served him, and in return, he promised the local people a big haul of fish. People prayed for his soul after his death and from that time were successful in catching many fish, which led them to a better life. Then people built the Ōsake Shrine in Sakoshi in order to pray for his soul. Ikishima Island, where his grave is located, has been regarded as a sacred island. Therefore entry to the island is strictly prohibited because of its sacredness.

=== Shōyoshō ===
In a legend from the Shōyoshō (聖誉鈔), a Muromachi period work on Prince Shōtoku, Kawakatsu is noted as one of the two sons of Hata no Sake no Kimi. The account describes Sake no Kimi (酒公) as a great-grandson of the first Chinese emperor (i.e. Qin Shi Huang), who received his name because he grew up in a jar (酒瓶, sakebin). Having fled China, Sake no Kimi arrived in Japan at Naniwa Bay in Settsu where he was awarded the name Hada (秦) by Empress Suiko. He is then said to have begot two sons, with the older, Toshiyuki, being ennobled, and the younger, Kōkatsu, becoming a servant.

Hata no Sake no Kimi is himself an important figure in the Hata clan's history, recognized in the Nihon Shoki as being made chief of the Hata in the fifteenth year of Emperor Yūryaku's reign (471 CE). Under Sake no Kimi's leadership the silk produced by the Hata workmen piled up so high that he was given the title of Uzumasa (Note: Said to come from uzumorimasa (うづもりまさ; "piled up to overflowing").) (禹豆麻佐, a phonetic spelling of 太秦).

== Legacy ==
=== Kōryū-ji ===
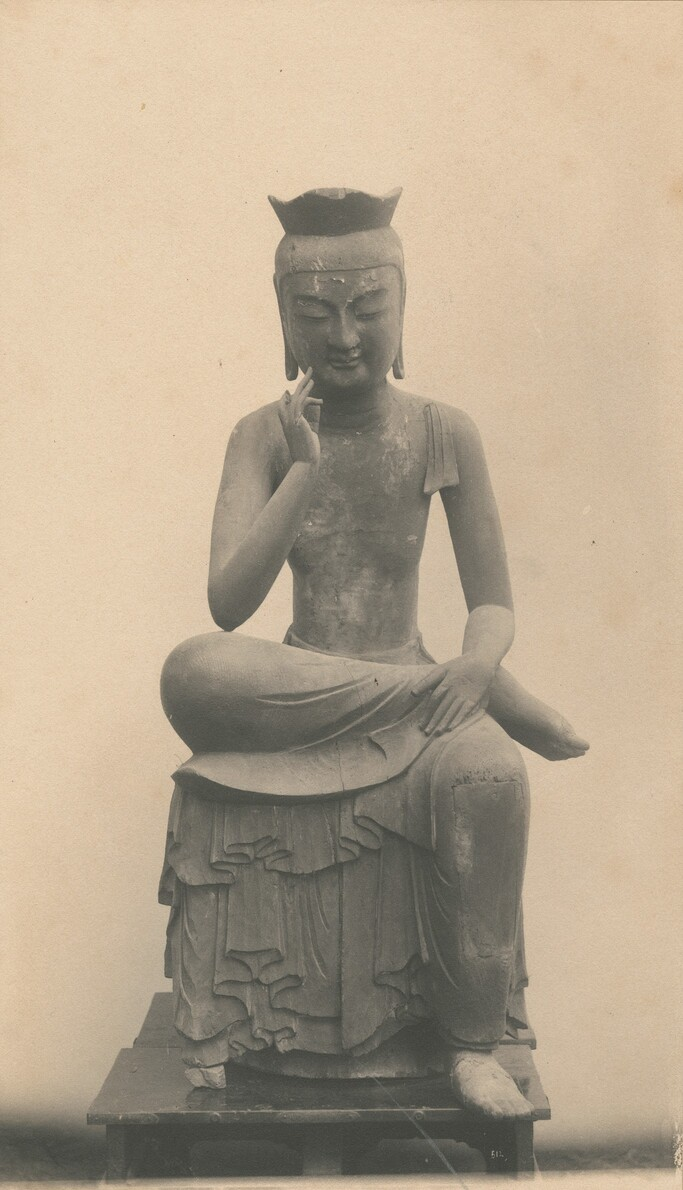
The "Crowned Maitreya" (宝冠弥勒, Hōkan Miroku) statue housed at Kōryū-ji, designated as a national treasure.

Hata no Kawakatsu is credited with founding Kōryū-ji (also called Uzumasa-dera (太秦寺), Kadono-dera (葛野寺), Hata no Kimi-dera (秦公寺) and Hachioka-dera (蜂岡寺)), a Hata clan temple located in the Uzumasa district. Said to be the oldest Buddhist temple in Kyoto. The Nihon Shoki records its construction as occurring in the year 603, after Kawakatsu received a statue of the Buddha as a gift from Prince Shōtoku. Temple tradition identifies this gift with a statue of Maitreya housed in its collection.

According to the Kōryū-ji Engi (広隆寺縁起) and Kōryūji Shizai Kōtai Jitsurokuchō (広隆寺資財交替実録帳) however, the temple was instead built in the year 622, as a memorial to Prince Shōtoku. This appears to correspond with another report in the Nihon Shoki, that in the year 623 a Buddha statue, presented by envoys from Silla and Mimana, was installed at the Hata Temple in Kadono (葛野秦寺, Kadono no Hata-dera). Furthermore, the Jōgū Shōtoku Hōō Teisetsu (上宮聖徳法王帝説; "Imperial Record of Prince Shōtoku, Dharma King of the Upper Palace") lists Kōryū-ji as one of the seven temples built by Prince Shōtoku himself.

=== Ōsake Jinja ===
Kawakatsu is enshrined as Ōsake Daimyōjin (大避大明神), also called Ōsake-no-Ōkami (大避大神), at the Ōsake Shrine (大避神社) in Akō, he additionally serves as the central deity of the shrine's autumn festival, the "Sakoshi Boat Festival" (坂越の船祭り, Sakoshi no Funamatsuri). According to the historical documents of the shrine, the festival was traditionally held on the 12th of September (based on the lunar calendar), the date Kawakatsu was believed to have drifted ashore the nearby island of Ikishima, however the festival is now held on the second weekend of October.

An Ōsake Shrine (大酒神社) is also present in Kyoto, formerly belonging to the precincts of Kōryū-ji before it was relocated during the Meiji Restoration. Although it does not enshrine Kawakatsu, instead venerating Emperor Qin Shi Huang, Yuzuki no Kimi and Hata no Sake no Kimi, it is said that the shrine was initially established by one King Kōman (功満王), a supposed descendant of Qin Shi Huang and ancestor of the Hata clan, to worship the deity Ōsake Myōjin (大酒明神). Additionally, the Engishiki records the shrine's name as Ōsake Jinja (大辟神社), with the enshrined deity being referred to as Ōsake-no-Kami (大辟神).

The Japanese scholar Peter Yoshiro Saeki, in his work Uzumasa wo Ronzu (太秦を論ず; "Discussing the Hata"), argued that Ōsake (大酒 or 大辟) was derived from the Chinese name for King David (大闢, Dàpì), citing this, among other things, as proof that the Hata were of Jewish descent. This is widely dismissed as ahistorical in modern scholarship however, as Dàpì (大闢) is only used to render the name David in modern Chinese (while Duōhuì (多恵) was used historically), and the case for Jewish ancestry among the Hata lacks any significant textual or DNA evidence to support it.

=== Meishukushū ===
Zeami Motokiyo's successor and son-in-law, Konparu Zenchiku, also viewed Kawakatsu as an important figure in his conception of the deity Okina, as developed in his incomplete work the Meishukushū (明宿集; "Collected Writings Illuminating the Indwelling Deity"). The text serves chiefly as an explication of the nature and significance of Okina (翁; "Old Man"), a name referring to the central role played in Shiki-sanban, interpreted by Zenchiku as a primordial deity who was the source of all the gods and buddhas. The Meishukushū identifies numerous figures as manifestations of Okina, such as Sumiyoshi Daimyōjin and Ariwara no Narihira, but places particular emphasis on Shukujin (宿神; meaning "astral deity" or "god of destiny"); a god worshiped among outcast groups; inhabitants of the shuku (宿; "relay station"), presented in the Meishukushū as a clan deity of the Konparu family.

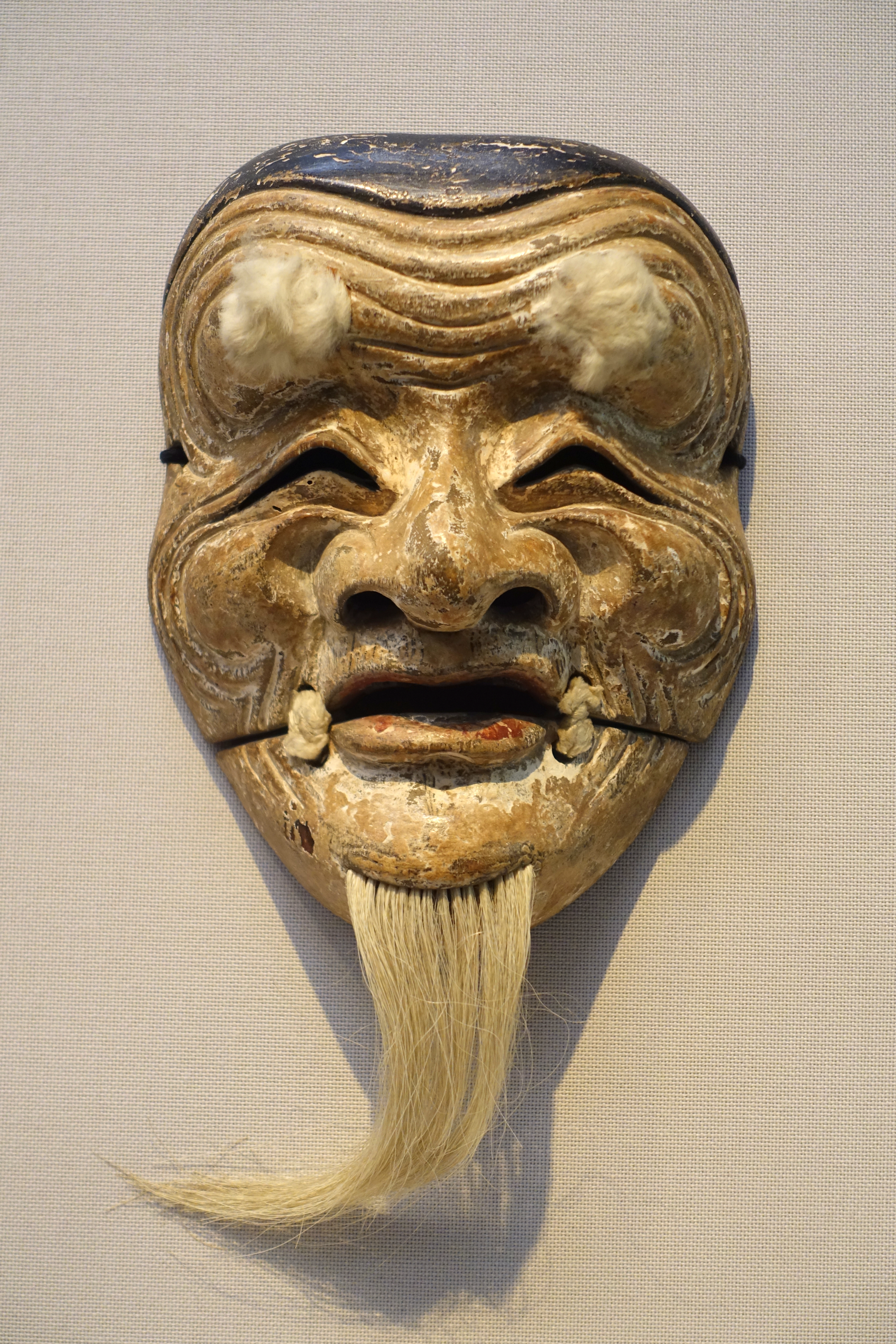
A Muromachi period Okina (翁; "Old Man") mask, used in Shiki-sanban

According to Zenchiku, Okina came into being at the creation of the world to protect the imperial throne and aid the Japanese people. Kawakatsu in-turn served as one of the many incarnations of Okina, and performed Okina-sarugaku (翁猿楽) at the command of Prince Shōtoku with the intention of establishing peace in the realm. As a result, Zenchiku assigned spiritual significance to Kawakatsu's actions, stating of his involvement in the Battle of Shigisan:

When the prince destroyed the rebel minister Moriya, shooting him with a magic arrow, as he fell from the scaffold Moriya intoned a passage from the Lotus Sutra:

“Thus my many wishes of long ago are now fully satisfied.”

Kōkatsu intoned the next phrase:

“Transforming all living beings, all are brought into the Buddhist way.”

At the time the Lotus Sutra had not yet been brought from China. It is thus clear that both were the expedient means of incarnations benefiting living beings. It is this same Kōkatsu who was commanded to perform sarugaku and first danced Okina at the Shishinden of the Tachibana court. So it is recorded.

Additionally, the Konparu lineage claimed descent from Kawakatsu, citing as proof their inheritance of three treasures that had supposedly been handed down from Kawakatsu himself: A demon mask carved by Prince Shōtoku, a painting of Okina as performed by Kawakatsu (though formerly described by Zeami as a portrait of Kasuga Myōjin), and one of the Buddha's relics. In the Meishukushū, this mask was further explained by Zenchiku as representing the dual-nature of Shukujin, who manifests as both the benevolent deity of song and dance, Okina, and the "raging spirit" (荒神, kōjin) of Hata no Kawakatsu.

Concerning the fact that, in contrast to Okina, an oni mask is enshrined in this troupe. Prince Shōtoku made it. He gave it to Kōkatsu when he ordered him to perform sarugaku. This is therefore a mask with the same essence as Okina. The various heavenly and protective deities, the Buddhas and bodhisattvas, and human beings too, all have two forms, mild and fierce.

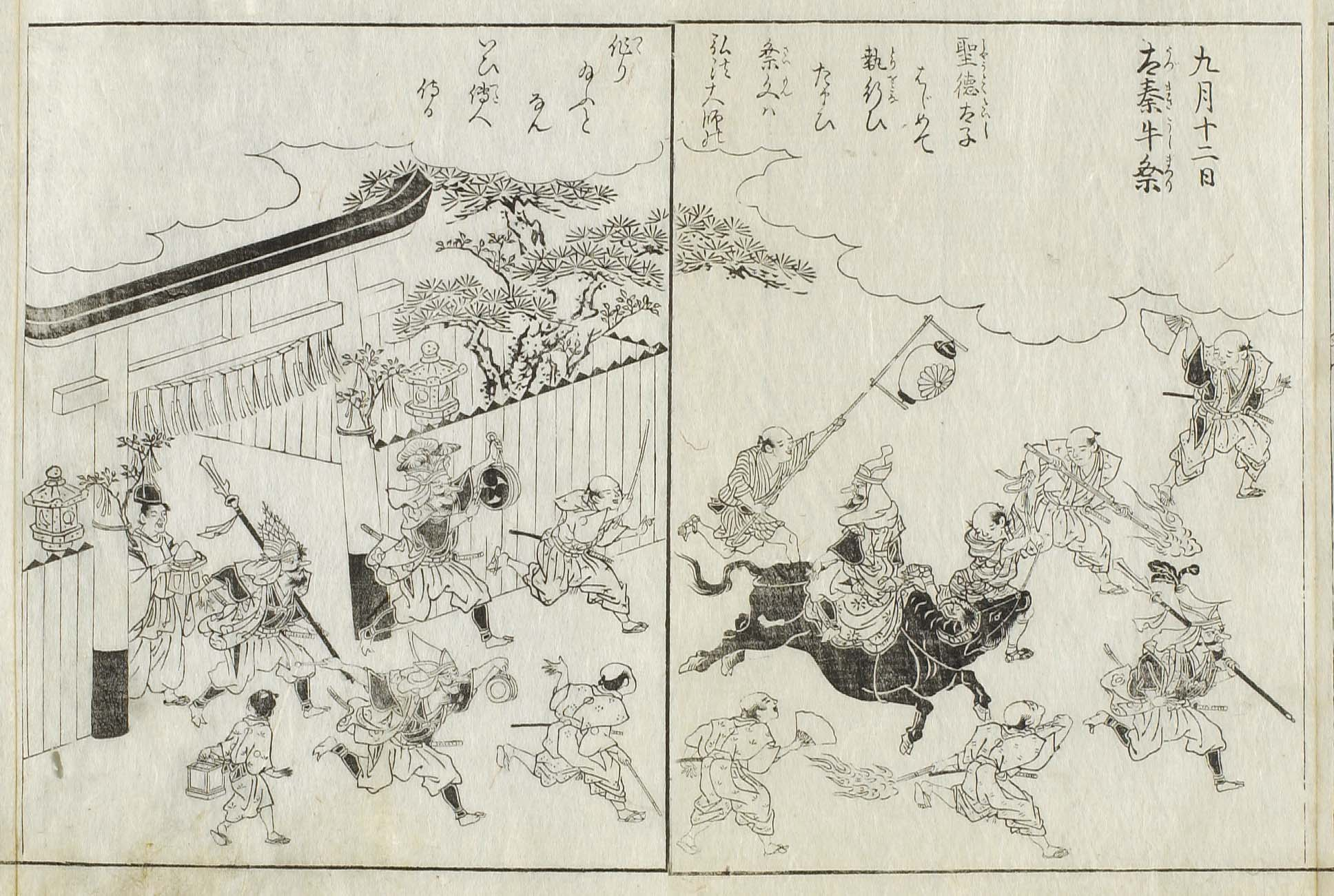
An Edo period illustration of the "Ox Festival" (牛祭, Ushi-matsuri) held at Kōryū-ji, centered on the deity Matarajin.

Though never explicitly mentioned in the Meishukushū, it has been suggested by Hattori Yukio that Zenchiku implicitly equated the Tendai deity Matarajin with his notion of Shukujin. Matarajin was chiefly enshrined at the backdoor (後戸, ushirodo) of temples, where sarugaku performances took place, and so merged with the figure of Okina as a protector of the performing arts. Hattori thus argued that the original function of sarugaku was to entertain and placate Matarajin, whose violent disposition was projected on to the stories surrounding Kawakatsu. A connection between the two figures is further evidenced by Matarajin's role in the annual "Ox Festival" (牛祭, Ushi-matsuri) held at Kōryū-ji, wherein a priest wearing a white mask (supposedly representing Matarajin), flanked by four monks dressed as demons (symbolizing the Four Heavenly Kings), rides a black ox while reciting saimon (祭文; "ritual text") aimed at eliminating disease. Moreover, it has been proposed that Matarajin was a deity worshiped by Korean immigrants such as the Hata clan, and that Matarajin's identification with Okina was facilitated by his association with such groups.

== Bibliography ==
- Aston, William George (1896). Nihongi : chronicles of Japan from the earliest times to A.D. 697. Vol. 2. Kegan Paul, Trench, Trübner & Co.
- Como, Michael (2009). Weaving and Binding: Immigrants Gods and Female Immortals in Ancient Japan. University of Hawaii Press. ISBN 978-0-8248-3752-5. JSTOR j.ctt6wqcr3.
- Deal, William E. (1999). "30. Hagiography and History: The Image of Prince Shōtoku". Religions of Japan in Practice. Vol. 17. Princeton University Press. pp. 316–333. doi:10.1515/9780691214740-036. ISBN 978-0-691-21474-0.
- Faure, Bernard (2011). "From Bodhidharma to Daruma: The Hidden Life of a Zen Patriarch". Japan Review (23). International Research Centre for Japanese Studies, National Institute for the Humanities: 45–71. ISSN 0915-0986. JSTOR 41304923.
- Faure, Bernard (2013). "The Cultic World of the Blind Monks: Benzaiten, Jūzenji, and Shukujin". Journal of Religion in Japan. 2 (2–3): 171–194. doi:10.1163/22118349-12341254. ISSN 2211-8349.
- Faure, Bernard (2015). Protectors and Predators. Gods of Medieval Japan. Vol. 2. University of Hawaii Press. ISBN 978-0-8248-5772-1.
- Faure, Bernard (2022). Rage and Ravage. Gods of Medieval Japan. Vol. 3. University of Hawaii Press. ISBN 978-0-8248-8938-8.
- Goethem, Ellen V. (2008). "Chapter Three. The Search For A Suitable Site". Nagaoka: Japan's Forgotten Capital. Brill. pp. 69–92. doi:10.1163/9789047433255_006. ISBN 9789047433255.
- Keyworth, George A. (2017). "Copying for the Kami: The Manuscript Set of the Buddhist Canon Held by Matsuno'o Shrine". Japanese Journal of Religious Studies. 44 (2): 161–190. doi:10.18874/jjrs.44.2.2017.161-190. ISSN 0304-1042. JSTOR 90017695.
- Kim, Sujung (2014). Transcending Locality, Creating Identity: Shinra Myōjin, a Korean Deity in Japan (Thesis). Columbia University. doi:10.7916/D8SF2TBT.
- Kondo, Masaki (1991). "The formation of sacred places as a factor of the environmental preservation: The case of Setonaikai (Inland Sea) in Japan". Marine Pollution Bulletin. 23: 649–652. Bibcode:1991MarPB..23..649K. doi:10.1016/0025-326X(91)90751-D. ISSN 0025-326X.
- Morris, James H. (2016). "The Legacy of Peter Yoshirō Saeki: Evidence of Christianity in Japan before the Arrival of Europeans". Journal of Academic Perspectives. 2016 (2): 1–22. ISSN 2328-8264.
- Payne, Richard; Rozett, Ellen (1994). "Activity of the Aya and Hata in the Domain of the Sacred". Pacific World: Journal of the Institute of Buddhist Studies. 10: 219–230. ISSN 0897-3644.
- Pinnington, Noel J. (1998). "Invented Origins: Muromachi Interpretations of "okina sarugaku"". Bulletin of the School of Oriental and African Studies. 61 (3): 492–518. doi:10.1017/S0041977X00019315. ISSN 0041-977X. JSTOR 3107756.
- Pinnington, Noel J. (2006). Traces in the Way: Michi and the Writings of Komparu Zenchiku. Cornell University Press. ISBN 978-1-942242-32-1. JSTOR 10.7591/j.ctv2vnh12h.
- Rambelli, Fabio (2021). "The Dharma of Music: Gagaku and Buddhist Salvation in Medieval Japan". Japanese Journal of Religious Studies. 48 (1): 45–71. doi:10.18874/jjrs.48.1.2021.45-71. ISSN 0304-1042. JSTOR 27039931.
- Rimer, J. Thomas; Yamazaki, Masakazu (1984). On the art of the nō drama : the major treatises of Zeami. Princeton University Press. ISBN 978-0-691-21330-9.
- Sakakibara, Sayoko (2012). Domesticating Prince Shōtoku : Tokugawa sacred geography and the construction of a national landscape (Thesis). Stanford University, Department of History.
- Scheid, Bernhard; Teeuwen, Mark (2015). The Culture of Secrecy in Japanese Religion. Routledge. ISBN 9781134168743.
- Su, Nan-Yao (2014). "Tokoyo no Kami: A Caterpillar Worshipped by a Cargo Cult in Ancient Japan". American Entomologist. 60 (3): 182–188. doi:10.1093/ae/60.3.182. ISSN 1046-2821.
- Wilson, William Scott (2013). The Spirit of Noh: A New Translation of the Classic Noh Treatise the Fushikaden. Shambhala Publications. ISBN 9780834828988.
