= Nissin Electric =

Japanese electrical equipment company

Nissin Electric Co., Ltd.
- Native name: 日新電機株式会社
- Romanized name: Nisshin Denki Kabushiki-gaisha
- Company type: Subsidairy KK
- Traded as: TYO: 6641
- Industry: Electrical equipment
- Founded: (April 11, 1917; 109 years ago)
- Headquarters: 47, Umezu-Takase-cho, Ukyo-ku, Kyoto 615-8686, Japan
- Key people: Yoshikazu Amano (Chairman); Hideaki Obata (President)
- Products: Substation equipment; Power distribution equipment; Reactive power compensation equipment; Supervisory control systems; Ion doping systems; Photovoltaic systems
- Revenue: ▲US$ 1.07 billion (FY 2013) (JPY 109.8 billion) (FY 2013)
- Net income: ▲US$ 52.49 million (FY 2013) (JPY 5.35 billion) (FY 2013)
- Owner: Sumitomo Electric Industries
- Number of employees: 4,720 (as of March 31, 2014)
- Website: Official website

Nissin Electric Co., Ltd. (日新電機株式会社, Nisshin Denki Kabushiki-gaisha) is a Japanese, Kyoto-based electrical equipment company. The company is a member of the Sumitomo Group and a partner of Sumitomo Electric Industries. As of 2015, Nissin Electric has 24 subsidiaries located in Japan, China, Taiwan, Korea, Thailand, Vietnam, India, U.S.A. and Spain.

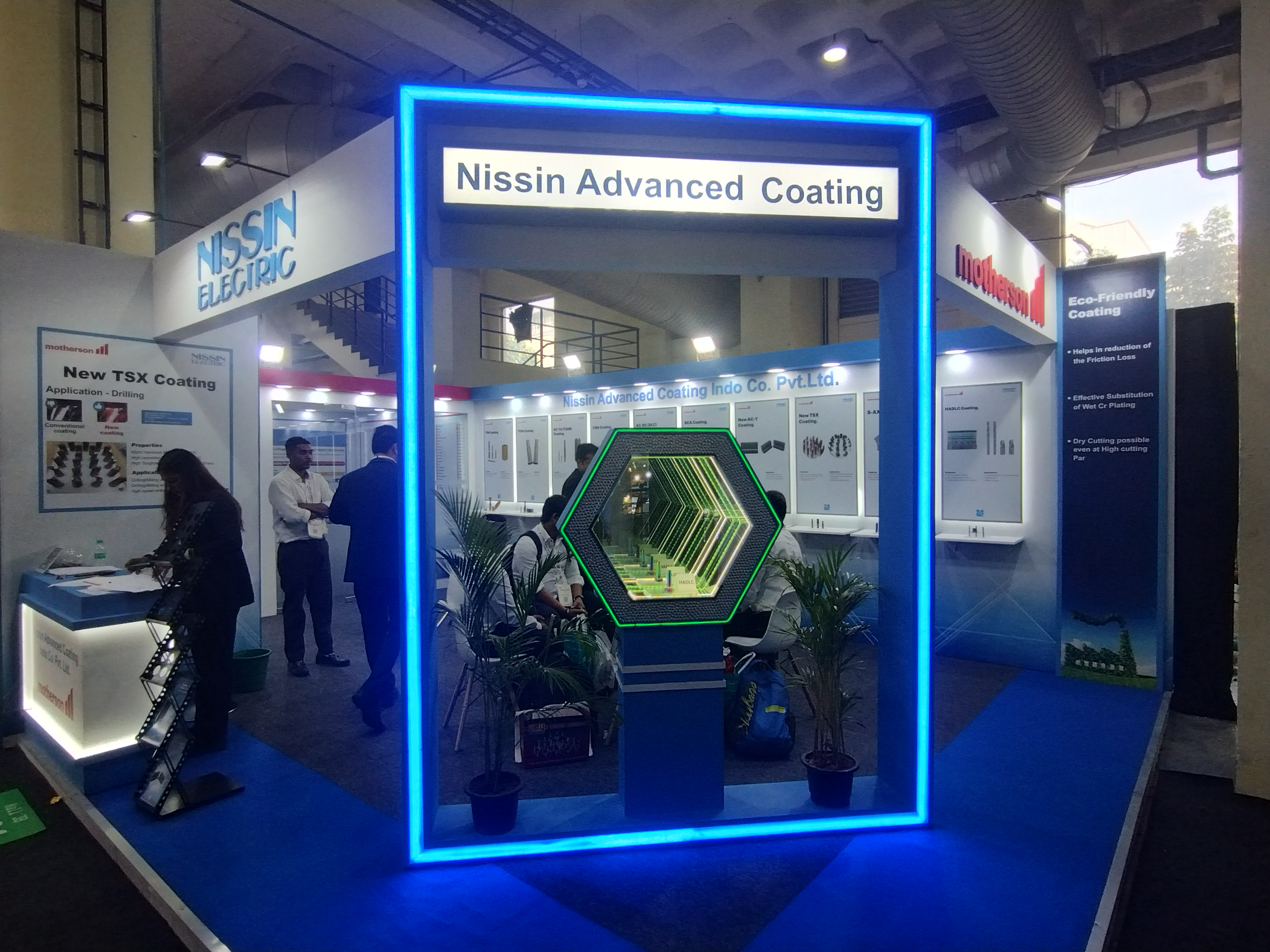
A Nissin Electric stall at Bangalore International Exhibition Centre, 2025

== Business segments and products ==
=== Power system equipment ===
- Gas insulated switchgears
- Capacitors
- Transformers
- Shunt reactors
- Instrument transformers
- Medium / low voltage metal enclosed equipment
- Islanding protection device

=== Charged beam equipment and processing ===
- Ion implanters
- Electron beam processing systems
- Thin-film coating service

=== Renewable energy and environment ===
- Static VAR compensator
- Voltage dip compensators for low voltage applications
- Power conditioners for photovoltaic systems
- Photovoltaic systems

=== Life cycle engineering ===
- Installation, adjustment, inspection and maintenance services
