= Kyoto Koka Women's University =

Private women's college in Ukyō, Kyoto, Kyoto, Japan

Coordinates: 34°59′50.4″N 135°43′8″E

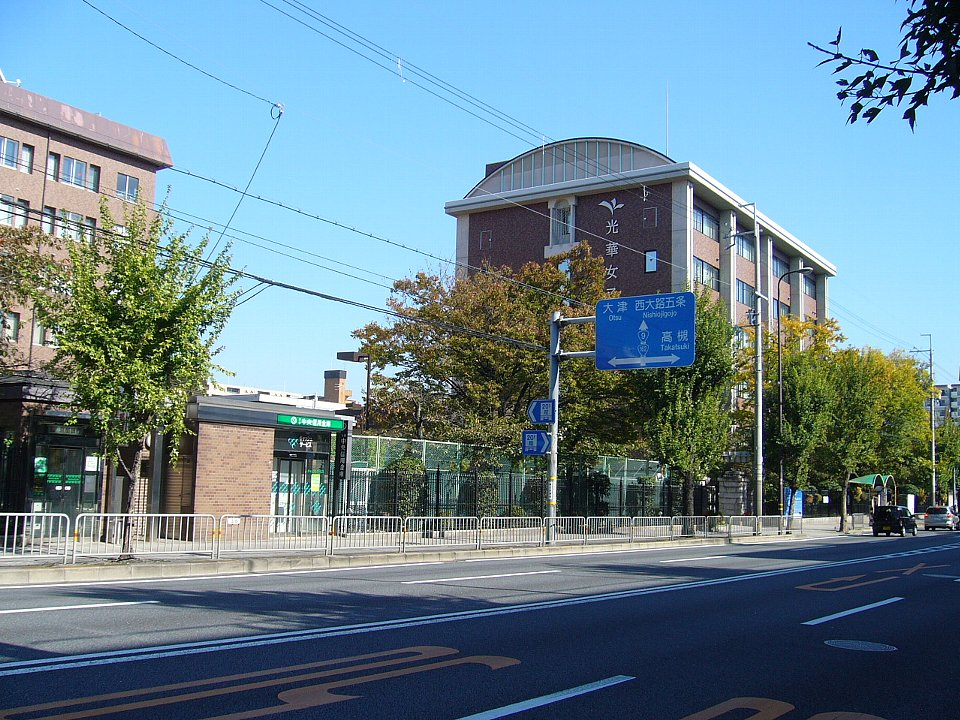
Kyoto Koka Women's University

Kyoto Koka Women's University (京都光華女子大学, Kyoto kōka joshi daigaku) is a private women's college in Ukyō, Kyoto, Kyoto, Japan. The predecessor of the school was founded in 1939. It was chartered as a women's junior college in 1949 and became a four-year college in 1964.
