= Kōryū-ji =

Buddhist temple in Kyōto, Japan

- 広隆寺
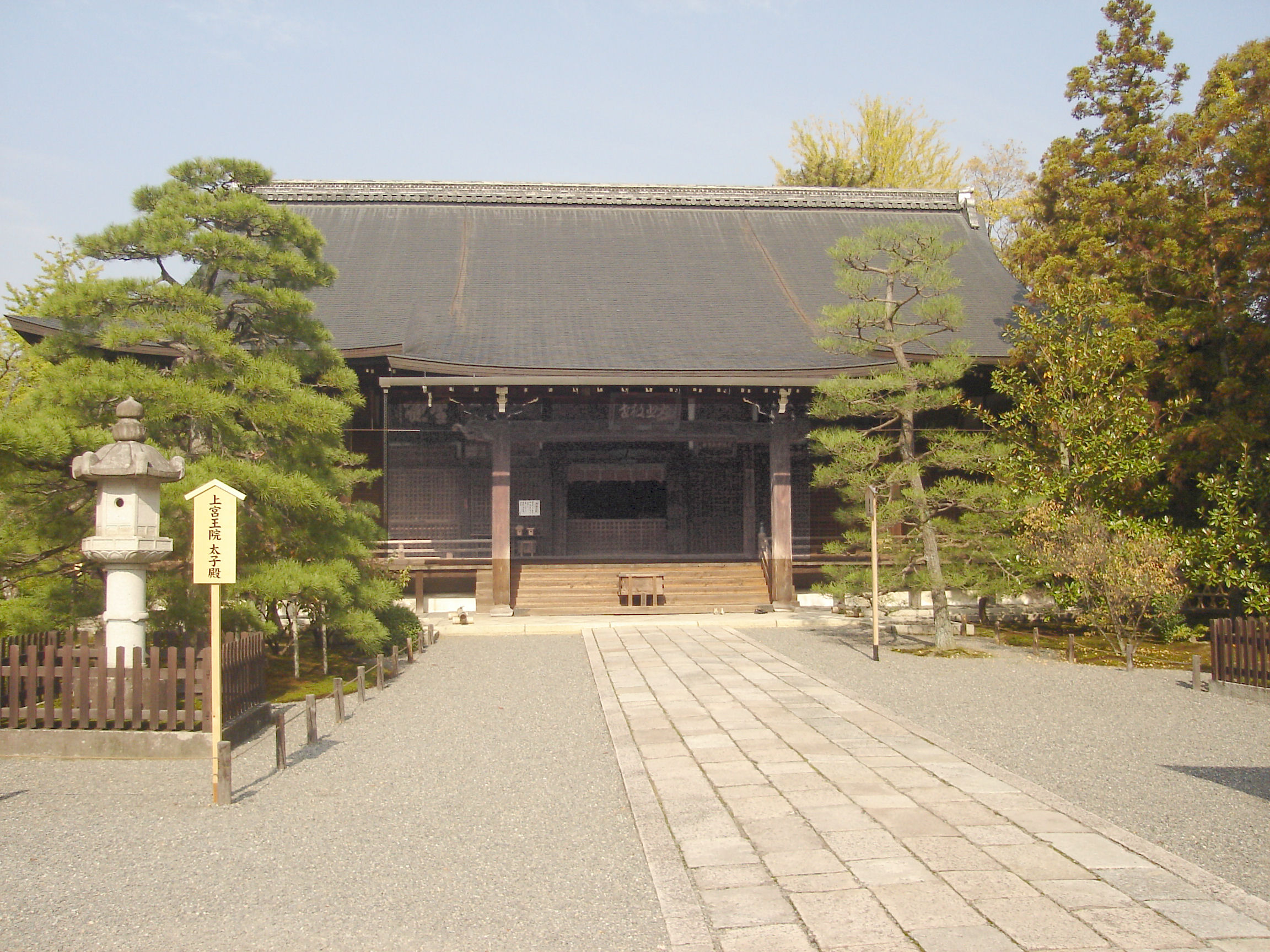
- Kōryū-ji Taishi-den

- Location within Kyoto Prefecture Location within Japan

Religion
- Affiliation: Buddhist
- Deity: Prince Shotoku
- Rite: Shingon
- Status: functional

Location
- Location: 32 Uzumasa Hachioka-cho, Ukyo-ku, Kyoto-shi, Kyoto-fu
- Country: Japan
- Coordinates: 35°00′55.8″N 135°42′26.13″E

Architecture
- Founder: c.Hata no Kawakatsu
- Completed: c.603 or 622
- National Treasure National Important Cultural Property

Kōryū-ji (広隆寺) is a Shingon temple in Uzumasa, Ukyō Ward, Kyoto, Japan. The temple is also known by the names Uzumasa-dera (太秦寺) and Kadono-dera (葛野寺), and was formerly known as Hatanokimi-dera (秦公寺), Hachioka-dera (蜂岡寺) and Hōkō-ji (蜂岡寺).

Kōryū-ji is said to be the oldest temple in Kyoto, having been constructed in 603 by Hata no Kawakatsu upon receiving a Buddhist statue from Prince Shōtoku. Fires in 818 and 1150 destroyed the entire temple complex, but it was rebuilt several times since.

== History ==
The prevailing theory is that Kōryū-ji was founded in the first half of the 7th century near the present-day Hirano Shrine in Kita-ku, Kyoto (identified as the site of the "Kitano Temple ruins"), and moved to its current location around the time of the Heian-kyō foundation. Initially, the temple's principal image was Miroku Bosatsu, but around the time of its relocation, it became a temple centered on Yakushi Nyorai, and it also became a temple centered on the worship of Prince Shōtoku. The principal image of the Jōgūō-in, which is the current main hall of Kōryū-ji, is a statue of Prince Shōtoku. The "Jōgū Shōtoku Hōō Teisetsu" lists Hachioka-dera (Kōryū-ji) as one of the "Seven Great Temples Established by Prince Shotoku."

While texts such as the "Nihon Shoki" confirmed that it was a family temple of the Hata clan established by Hata no Kawakatsu, many points remain unclear due to the loss of ancient records in a fire in 818. The Hata clan was a toraijin immigrant clan, whose origins are theorized as from Han China, Silla or Baekje. They possessed skills in sericulture, weaving, sake brewing, and water management. The Kijima-za Amaterasu Mitama Jinja (a shrine dedicated to silkworms) near Kōryū-ji, the Umenomiya Taisha in Umezu, Ukyo-ku, Kyoto, and the Matsuo Taisha in Arashiyama, (both dedicated to the gods of sake brewing) are also said to be shrines related to the Hata clan. According to the Nihon Shoki, in the 11th year of Empress Suiko's reign (603), Prince Shōtoku asked his ministers, "I have a precious Buddha statue in my possession; is there anyone who would like to worship it?" and Hata no Kawakatsu received the statue and built Hachioka-dera. On the other hand, the Kōryū-ji Engi (Jōwa Engi), compiled in 838, and the Kōryū-ji Shizai Kōtai Jitsurokuchō (Record of the Changes in Koryu-ji Temple's Assets), compiled around 890, state that Kōryū-ji was built in the 30th year of Empress Suiko's reign (622) to commemorate Prince Shōtoku, who died that same year. There is a difference of nearly 20 years regarding the founding year between the Nihon Shoki and the Kōryū-ji Engi, which may indidate that the temple was founded in 603 and completed in 622, or that "Hachioka-dera," built in 603, and another temple built in 622 later merged. On the other hand, the Shōtoku Taishi Denreki (Biography of Prince Shōtoku) contains an alternative account that the temple was built on Prince Shōtoku's Kaede-no-betsugū detached palace.

Kōryū-ji was completely destroyed by fire in 818, and none of the original buildings remain. Dōshō (a disciple of Kūkai), who became the head priest of Kōryū-ji in 836, worked to restore the burnt halls, pagodas, and Buddhist statues, and is considered the restorer of Kōryū-ji. Later, in 1150, the temple was completely destroyed by fire, but it was rebuilt relatively quickly, and the dedication ceremony for the various halls was held in 1165. The existing lecture hall (an Important Cultural Property), although heavily modified, is thought to be a successor to the building completed in 1165.

The temple possesses the "Kōryū-ji Engi Shizai-chō" (National Treasure), compiled in 873, and the "Kōryū-ji Shizai Kōtai Jitsuroku-chō" (National Treasure), dating from around 890. These documents provide clues to understanding the actual state of Kōryū-ji's buildings, Buddhist statues, land, and assets in the 9th century. The "Jitsuroku-cho" is a record of changes made by inspecting the entries in the "Shizai-cho" more than ten years later. While the first few dozen lines of the "Shizai-chō" are missing, the "Jitsuroku-chō" can fill in these gaps.

During the Edo period, following the enthronement of Emperor Reigen in 1663, Kōryū-ji was added as one of the "Seven Great Temples" institutionalized by Emperor Go-Mizunoo, and played a role in national prayers.

== Statues of Miroku Bosatsu ==
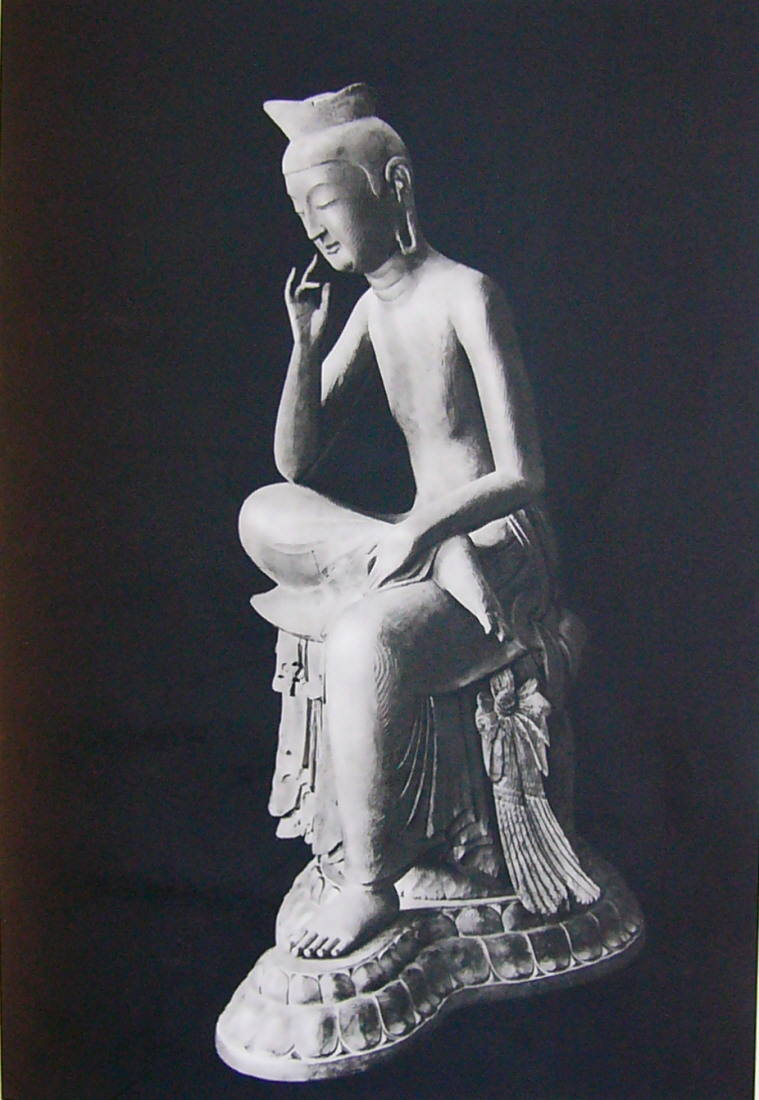
A statue of the bodhisattva Maitreya, at Kōryū-ji

Kōryū-ji houses two half-seated Maitreya Bodhisattva statues, sitting contemplatively in the half-lotus position, commonly known as the "Hōkan Miroku" (宝冠弥勒) and Hōkei Miroku (泣き弥勒), both designated as National Treasures. The Hōkan Maitreya statue is made of Japanese red pine, a unique material for ancient Japanese Buddhist statues. The Hokei Maitreya statue, on the other hand, is made of camphor wood, a common material for wooden sculptures from the Asuka period.

As mentioned earlier, the Nihon Shoki records that in the 11th year of Empress Suiko's reign (603 AD), Hata no Kawakatsu received a Buddhist statue from Prince Shōtoku. However, the Nihon Shoki only refers to it as a "revered Buddha statue," not specifically mentioning "Maitreya," and there is no conclusive evidence that this "revered Buddha statue" corresponds to either of the two Maitreya Bodhisattva statues mentioned above.In addition, although it is a later record, the "Kōryū-ji Raiyuki" (compiled in 1499) states that in the 24th year of Empress Suiko's reign (616), a gilded bronze statue of the Maitreya Bodhisattva, seated at a height of 2 shaku, was brought from Silla and enshrined in the temple. Furthermore, the Nihon Shoki contains an account that in the 31st year of Emperor Suiko's reign (623, or the 30th year in the Iwasaki edition), envoys from Silla and Mimana came to Japan and enshrined Buddhist statues they brought back at Kadono Hata-dera, and there is a theory that these Buddhist statues correspond to one of the two wooden half-seated statues of Maitreya Bodhisattva.

Hōkan Miroku statue is 123.3 centimeters tall (including the left foot), and 84.2 centimeters tall when seated. Carved from a single piece of Japanese red pine, it depicts Maitreya with his right hand lightly resting on his cheek, in a contemplative pose. While the surface of the statue currently shows most of its natural wood, traces of gold leaf remain on the lower abdomen and other areas, indicating it was originally covered. The index and little fingers of the right hand and the tips of both feet are later additions, and the face has also been repaired. The statue is believed to have been made in the 7th century, but based on its style and other characteristics, the prevailing theory is that it was brought from the Korean Peninsula. There are hypotheses that it was made in Japan, and hypotheses that it was carved in Japan from sacred wood brought from the Korean Peninsula, but this is not certain. The theory that it was brought from the Korean Peninsula suggests that this statue corresponds to the Buddhist statue brought to Silla in the 31st year of Empress Suiko's reign (623 AD), as recorded in the Nihon Shoki.

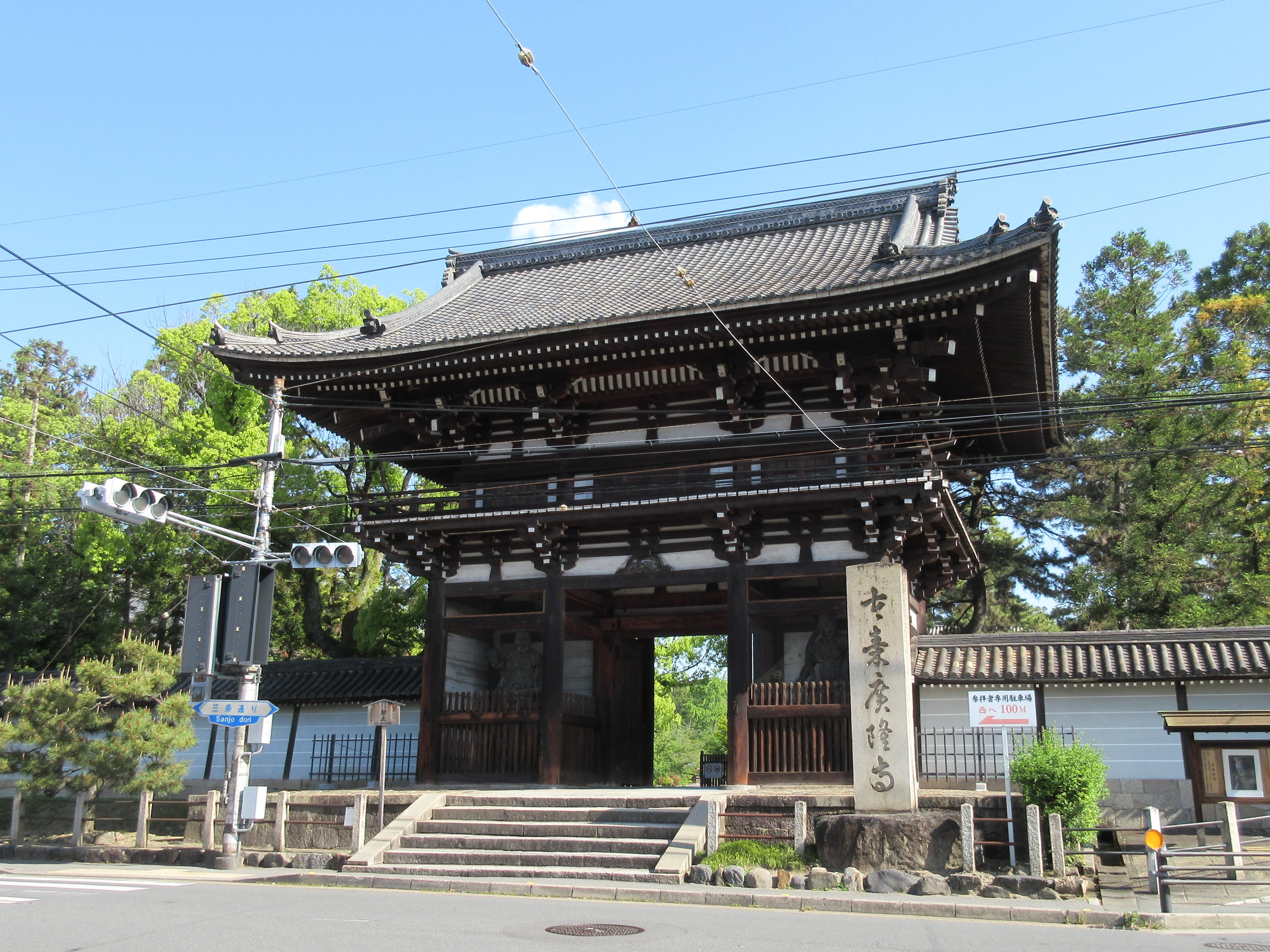
Roman main gate

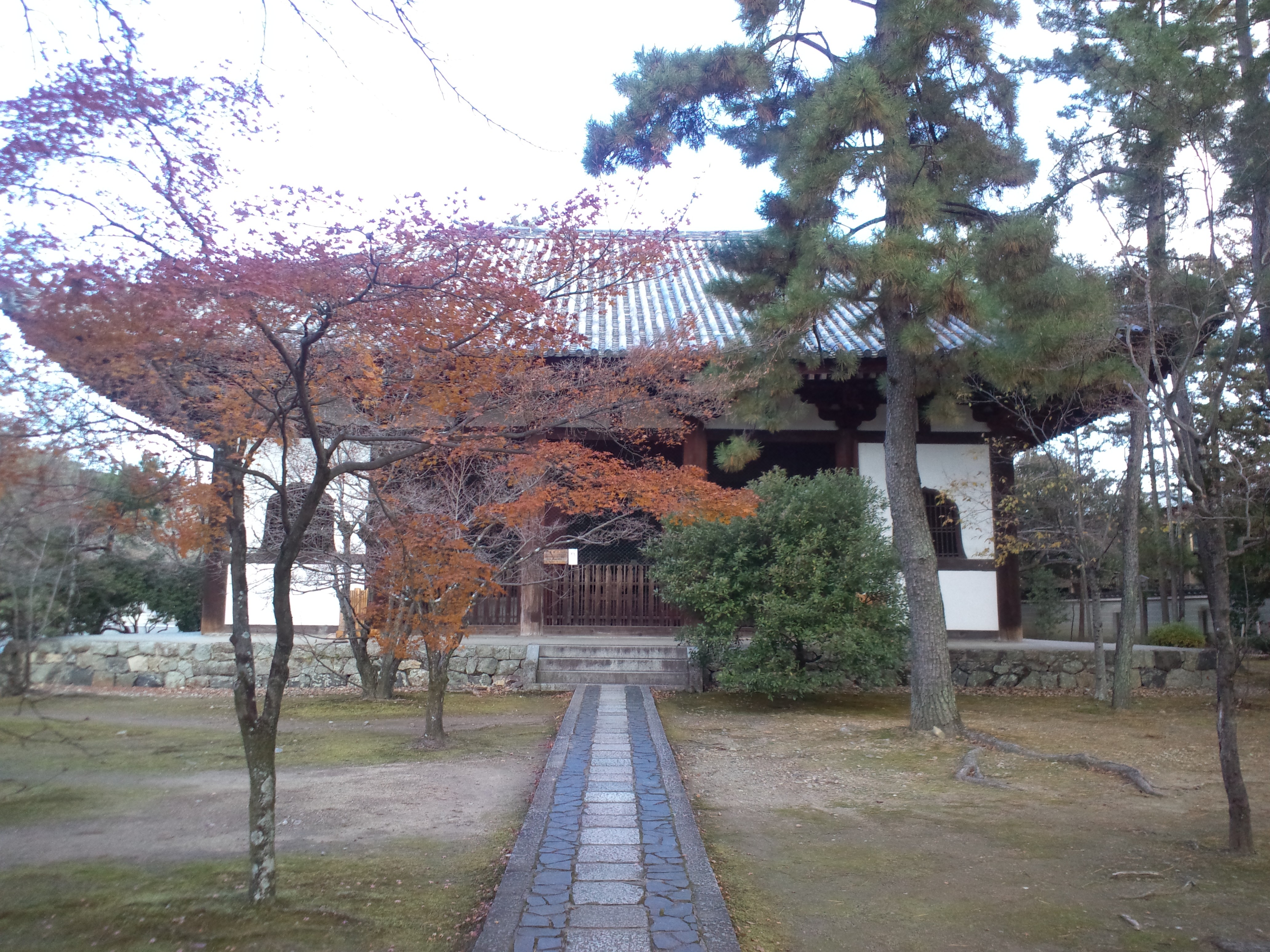
Lecture Hall

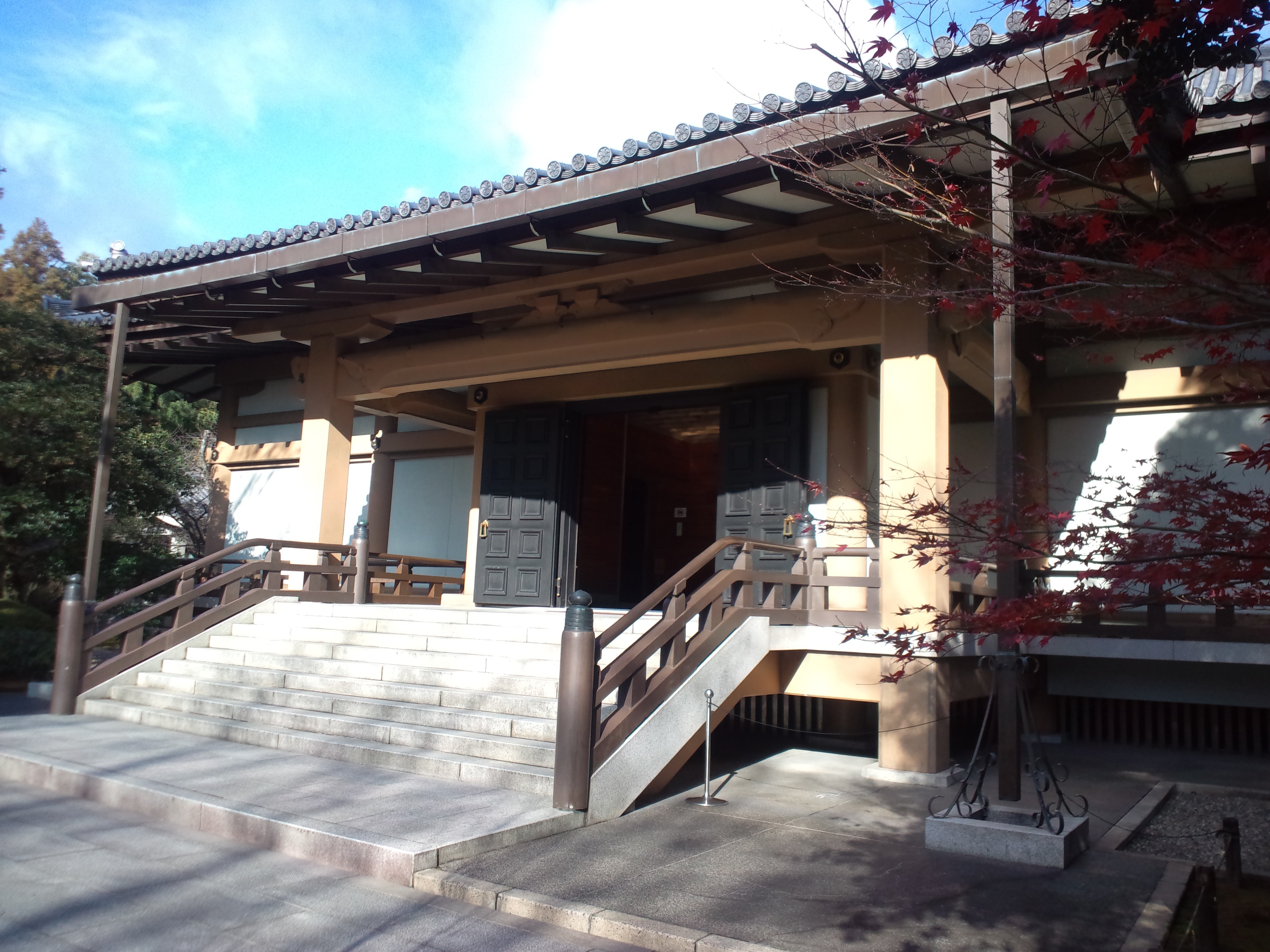
Reiho-den

== Cultural Properties ==
=== National Treasures ===
- Katsura-no-miya-in Hondo (桂宮院本堂) Kamakura period. The inner sanctuary of Kōryū-ji, it is located in a walled-off area on the west side of the temple grounds, it is believed to be the site of Prince Shotoku's Kaedeno Detached Palace and, like the Yumedono (Dream Hall) of Hōryū-ji, is an octagonal hall. The exact year of construction is unknown, but since there is a fundraising document for the construction of this hall dated 1251 survives. The octagonal shrine inside the hall is also from the same period and is designated as an accessory to the National Treasure. The principal image, a half-seated statue of Prince Shotoku (Kamakura period, ICP), has been moved to the Reihōden (Treasure Hall). The building is generally not open to the public.
- Wooden half-seated statue of Miroku Bosatsu (木造弥勒菩薩半跏像) (commonly known as the "Crowned Maitreya") - Explanation given above.
- Wooden half-seated statue of Miroku Bosatsu (木造弥勒菩薩半跏像) (commonly known as the "Weeping Maitreya") Asuka period - Housed in the Treasure Hall. Statue height 90 cm (including left foot), seated height 66.4 cm. A half-seated statue in a similar pose to "Crowned Maitreya," but slightly smaller in height. Made of camphor wood, which does not exist in the Korean Peninsula, it is believed to be a Japanese-made statue from the late 7th to early 8th century, although there are differing theories. It is commonly known as "Weeping Maitreya" because its somber expression and the way it places its right hand on its cheek make it appear as if it is weeping.
- Wooden seated statue of Amida Nyorai (木造阿弥陀如来坐像) - Heian period (c.840). Height 261.5 cm. The principal image of the Lecture Hall. Both hands are raised in front of the chest, forming the mudra of preaching. This statue corresponds to the one mentioned in the "Shizaicho" and "Jitsurokucho" as "the late Lady Nagahara's wish". Lady Nagahara refers to Nagahara-hime, a consort of Emperor Junna. The head and the main body are carved from a single large piece of hinoki cypress wood, and the surface of the statue is shaped by building up a thick layer of wood pulp lacquer. The double circular halo and the drapery pedestal have some later additions, but the original ones remain.
- Wooden standing statue of Fukūkensaku Kannon (木造不空羂索観音立像) late Nara period to early Heian period (late 8th century to early 9th century). Height 313.6 cm. Housed in the Reihōden (Treasure Hall). Until the opening of the new Reihōden, it was located in the northeast corner of the outer hall of the Lecture hall. One of the seven Buddhist statues predating the 818 fire at Koryu-ji Temple in 818).
- Wooden standing statue of Senjū Kannon (木造千手観音立像), early Heian period (9th century). Height 266.0 cm. Enshrined in the Reihōden. Until the new Reihōden opened, it was located in the northwest corner of the outer hall of the Lecture Hall.
- Wooden standing statues of Twelve Heavenly Generals (木造十二神将立像) Heian period (1064); set of 12. Height 113–123 cm. Enshrined in the Treasure Hall. According to the "Koryu-ji Origin Record," this set was created in 1064 by the sculptor Chōsei. Chōsei was a disciple of Jōchō.
- Kōryū-ji Inventory (広隆寺縁起資財帳) Heian period;
- Kōryū-ji Inventory Change Record (広隆寺資財交替実録帳) Heian period;

=== Important Cultural Properties ===
- Lecture Hall (講堂) Kamakura period (1165). Also known as the "Red Hall", this 5 x 5 bay structure has a hipped roof and tiled roof. According to the tile inscriptions and early modern drawings, it was originally called the "Kondo" (main hall). It is one of the few remaining Heian period buildings in Kyoto, but it was remodeled during the Eiroku period (1558-1570) and repaired in the early modern period, so there are hardly any old parts left in the exterior or eaves of the building. The interior is an earthen floor with tiles, and the three central bays on the front are open (without walls or fittings), while the bays on the left and right ends have earthen walls with arched windows. The interior shows the style of the Heian period, and the main hall is characterized by having two tiers of rainbow beams, with board frog-leg brackets, and an exposed attic without ceiling boards. The inner sanctuary houses the principal image, a seated statue of Amida Nyorai (NT), in the center, a seated statue of Jizo Bosatsu (ICP) to the right, and a seated statue of Kokuzo Bosatsu (ICP) to the left. General visitors are not allowed to enter the hall and can only view it from outside.
- Painted Silk Scroll of the Three Thousand Buddhas (絹本著色三千仏図), Heian period; Measuring over three meters in both height and width, it features a central triad of the past, present, and future Buddhas seated amidst a moonlight halo, with three thousand smaller Buddha images housed in the outer sanctuary. This is the principal image of the Butsumyo-e, a repentance ceremony held annually in the imperial court and various temples from the Heian period onward.
- Painted Silk Scroll of the Twelve Devas (絹本著色十二天像), Kamakura period;
- Painted Silk Scroll of Cundi Buddha (絹本著色准胝仏母図), Kamakura period;
- Painted Paper Scroll of the Tale of Nōe Hōshi (紙本著色能恵法師絵詞), Kamakura period;
- Wooden seated statue of Kokuzō Bosatsu (木造虚空蔵菩薩坐像), Heian period;
- Wooden seated statue of Jizō Bosatsu (木造地蔵菩薩立像), Heian period; (located in the Lecture Hall)
- Wooden standing Statue of Yakushi Nyorai (木造薬師如来立像), Heian period; - Hidden Buddha. Opened only on November 22.
- Clay seated statue of Miroku Butsu (塑造弥勒仏坐像), Nara period,
- Wooden seated statue of Dainichi Nyorai (木造大日如来坐像) Heian period; Height 95.5 cm
- Wooden seated statue of Dainichi Nyorai (木造大日如来坐像) Heian period,; Height 74.5 cm
- Wooden standing statue of Amida Nyorai (木造阿弥陀如来立像) Heian period; (Originally enshrined in the main hall of Katsura-no-miya Temple)
- Wooden seated statue of Monju Bosatsu (木造五髻文殊菩薩坐像), Heian period;
- Wooden standing statue of Shō Kannon (木造聖観音立像), Heian period;
- Wooden seated statue of Senjū Kannon (木造千手観音坐像) Heian period (1012)
- Wooden half-seated statue of Nyōirin Kannon (木造如意輪観音半跏像); Heian period; (originally enshrined in the main hall of Katsura-no-miya-in)
- Wooden standing statues of Nikkō and Gekkō Bosatsu (木造日光月光菩薩立像), Heian period;
- Wooden standing statue of Jizō Bosatsu (木造地蔵菩薩立像(埋木地蔵)) Heian period;
- Wooden standing statue of a Bodhisattva (木造菩薩立像), Heian period;
- Wooden seated statue of Fudō Myōō (木造不動明王坐像), Heian period;
- Wooden standing statue of Bishamonten (木造毘沙門天立像), Heian period;
- Wooden standing statues of Jikokuten, Zōchōten, and Komokuten (木造持国天・増長天・広目天立像), Heian period;
- Wooden standing statue of Tamonten (木造多聞天立像), Heian period;
- Wooden standing statue of Kichijoten (木造吉祥天立像) Heian period; (height 184.5 cm)
- Wooden standing statue of Kichijoten (木造吉祥天立像) Heian period; (height 168.0 cm)
- Wooden standing statue of Kichijoten (木造吉祥天立像) Heian period; (height 164.6 cm)
- Wooden Standing Statue of Kichijoten (木造吉祥天立像) Heian period; (Statue height 142.2 cm)
- Wooden Standing Statue of Kichijoten (木造吉祥天立像), Heian period; (Statue height 106.8 cm)
- Wooden half-standing statue of Shōtoku Taishi (木造聖徳太子半跏像), Kamakura period; Originally housed in the Katsura-no-miya Hondo
- Wooden standing statue of Zaō Gongen (木造蔵王権現立像), Heian period; Statue height 100.4 cm
- Wooden standing statue of Zaō Gongen (木造蔵王権現立像) Heian period; Statue height 96.4 cm
- Wooden Deity Statue (木造神像), Heian period; attributed to Hata no Kawakatsu.
- Wooden Seated Goddess Statue (木造女神坐像) Heian period; attributed to wife of Hata no Kawakatsu.
- Iron Bell (鉄鐘) - Kamakura period (1217).

Of the Buddhist statues designated as Important Cultural Properties, all except the seated statues of Kokuzo Bosatsu and Jizo Bosatsu are housed in the Reihoden (Treasure Hall).

== Festivals ==
The temple is also renowned for its Bull Festival (牛祭, ushi matsuri), traditionally held in mid-October, but currently suspended.

== See also ==
- Historical Sites of Prince Shōtoku
- List of Buddhist temples in Kyoto
- List of National Treasures of Japan (temples)
- List of National Treasures of Japan (ancient documents)
- List of National Treasures of Japan (sculptures)
