= Tokoyo-no-Kami =

Tokoyo-no-Kami (常世神, God of the Eternal World) is the god of Tokoyo-no-Kuni (常世の国, Land of Eternal Youth). It is believed that those who worship him would be blessed with wealth and longevity, making the poor rich and the elderly youthful again.

According to the Nihon Shoki, in the third year of Empress Kogyoku's reign, a man named Obe no Ta, from the vicinity of the Fujikawa River in eastern Japan, urged the villagers to worship insects, by saying, "These are the gods of Tokoyo. If you worship these gods, you will be granted wealth and longevity!" Later on, local shamans falsely claimed to have been given divine oracles, spreading the message that "If you worship the gods of Tokoyo, the poor will gain wealth and the elderly will become young again." However, to receive his blessings, people had to abandon their possessions and line the roadside with sake and food, chanting, "New wealth has come in!"

== Etymology ==
The god goes by the name "Tokoyo-no-Kami." Tokoyo is widely believed to be an "eternal land", a realm beyond our own, though not always deemed as the afterlife.
