= Ukyō-ku =

Ukyo 右京区
- Ward of Kyoto
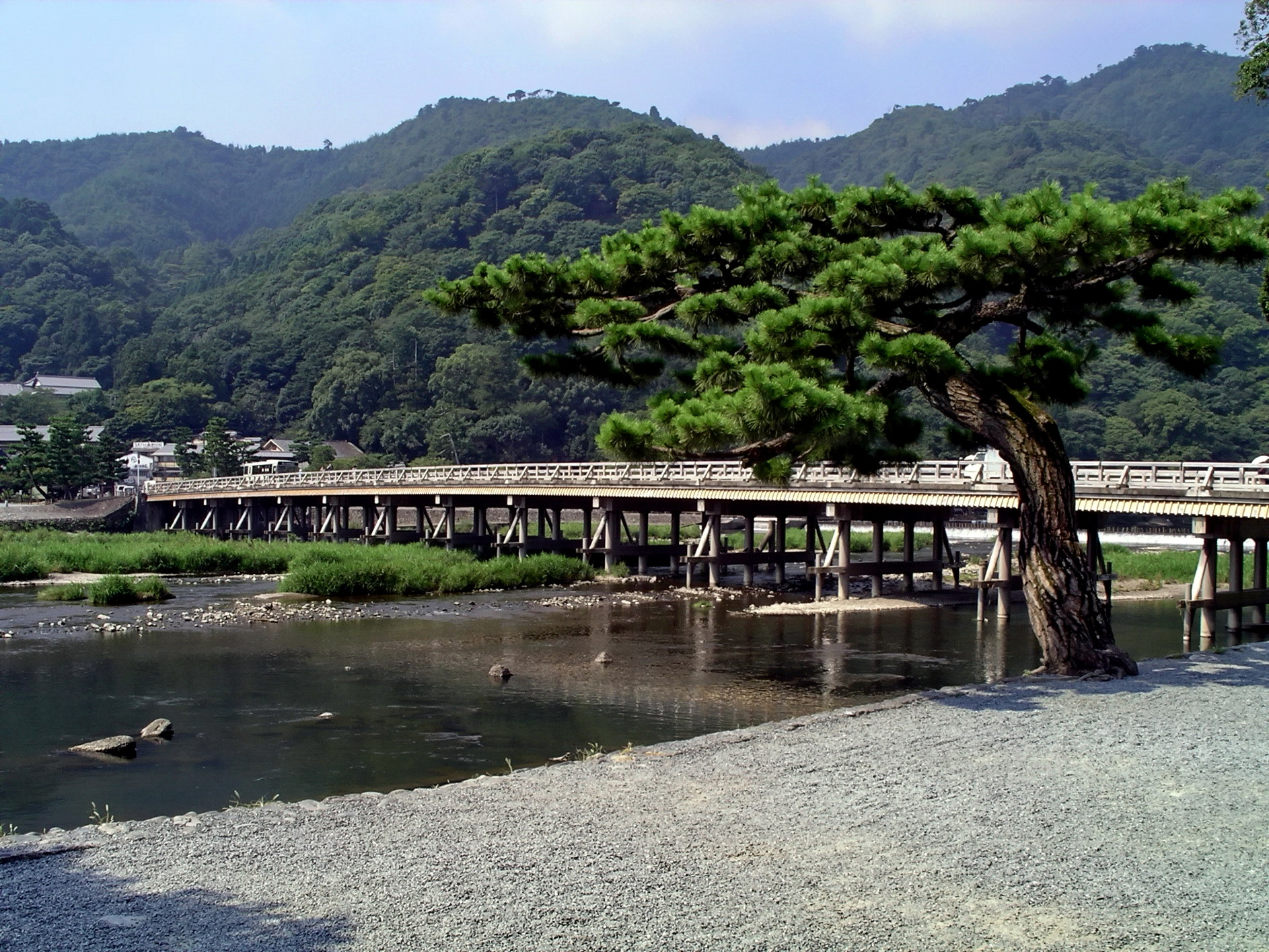
- Togetsu Bridge in Arashiyama

- Location of Ukyo in Kyoto

- Location in Japan
- Coordinates: 35°0′37″N 135°42′58″E
- Country: Japan
- Region: Kinki (Kansai)
- Prefecture: Kyoto

Area
  - Total: 292.07 km^{2} (112.77 sq mi)

Population (October 1, 2020)
  - Total: 202,047
  - Density: 691.78/km^{2} (1,791.7/sq mi)
- Time zone: UTC+09:00 (JST)
- City hall address: Uzumasa Shimokeibu-chō 12, Ukyo-ku, Kyoto City, Kyoto Prefecture (京都府京都市右京区太秦下刑部町12); 616-8511
- Website: www.city.kyoto.lg.jp/ukyo/

Ukyō-ku (右京区) is one of the eleven wards in the city of Kyoto, in Kyoto Prefecture, Japan.

== History ==
The meaning of ukyō (右京) is "on the Emperor's right." When residing in the Kyoto Imperial Palace the emperor would sit facing south, thus the western direction would be to his right. Similarly, there is a ward to the east called Sakyō-ku (左京区), meaning "the ward on the Emperor's left." In old times, ukyō was referring to the western part of the capital. The area of ancient Ukyō slightly overlaps the area of present Ukyō-ku.

The ward was established in 1931 when nine villages merged to form it.

On April 1, 2005, the ward expanded its territory to the area of former town of Keihoku when the town merged into the city of Kyoto. This increased the ward's territory from 74.27 square kilometres (28.68 sq mi) to 291.95 square kilometres (112.72 sq mi), and made it the largest ward in the city by area.

As of October 1, 2020, the ward has an estimated population of 202,047, with 97,849 households and a density of 692 inhabitants per square kilometre (1,790/sq mi).

Historical population
Year	Pop.	±%
1980	192,646	—
1990	195,323	+1.4%
2000	195,573	+0.1%
2010	202,943	+3.8%
2020	202,047	−0.4%

== Geography ==
=== Mountains ===
- Iwatayama
- Mount Atago
- Mount Ogura

=== Rivers ===
- Arisugawa
- Katsura River
- Tenjin River (Kamiya River)
- Yugegawa

=== Adjacent municipalities ===
- Kyoto wards of: Kita-ku, Sakyo-ku, Nakagyo-ku, Shimogyo-ku, Nishikyo-ku, and Minami-ku.
- Kameoka, Kyoto
- Nantan, Kyoto

== Sights ==
Ukyo-ku is home to many renowned sites, including:

- Arashiyama, a hill famed for its maple leaves and the Togetsu-kyō, the Bridge to the Moon
- Ninna-ji, a Buddhist temple with a fine pagoda
- Ryōan-ji, the Zen Buddhist temple with the karesansui (dry-landscape, i.e. raked stones) garden
- Tenryū-ji, the head temple of the Tenryū branch of Rinzai Zen Buddhism
- Sagano, a neighborhood with Sagano Romantic Train and many temples, including the Nonomiya Shrine as well as Rakushi-sha, the Fallen Persimmon Hut
- Uzumasa, the location of Kōryū-ji, a temple founded before Kyoto became the Imperial capital. The neighborhood is also the home of the Toei Uzumasa Eigamura studios and the center of Japan's television and film industries.

== Economy ==
Rohm, an electronic parts manufacturer, and Nissin Electric, a global electrical equipment company, are headquartered in the ward.

== Education ==
=== Universities ===
- Kyoto Koka Women's University
- Kyoto Saga University of Arts
- Kyoto University of Advanced Science - Kyoto Uzumasa Campus
- Kyoto University of Foreign Studies

=== Senior high schools ===
- Hanazono Senior High School (花園高等学校)
- Kitakuwada High School (ja:京都府立北桑田高等学校)
- Kitasaga Senior High School (ja:京都府立北嵯峨高等学校)
- Kyoto Gaidai Nishi High School
- Kyoto Gakuen High School (ja:京都学園高等学校)
- Kyoto Koka Senior High School (京都光華高等学校)
- Kyoto Prefectural Sagano High School

=== Junior high schools ===
There are 12 junior high schools, of which nine are public and three are private.

=== Elementary schools ===
There are 21 elementary schools, of which 20 are public and one is private.

=== Others ===
- North Korean school: Kyoto Korean No. 2 Elementary School (京都朝鮮第二初級学校).

== Sights of Ukyo-ku ==
Sights of Ukyō-ku

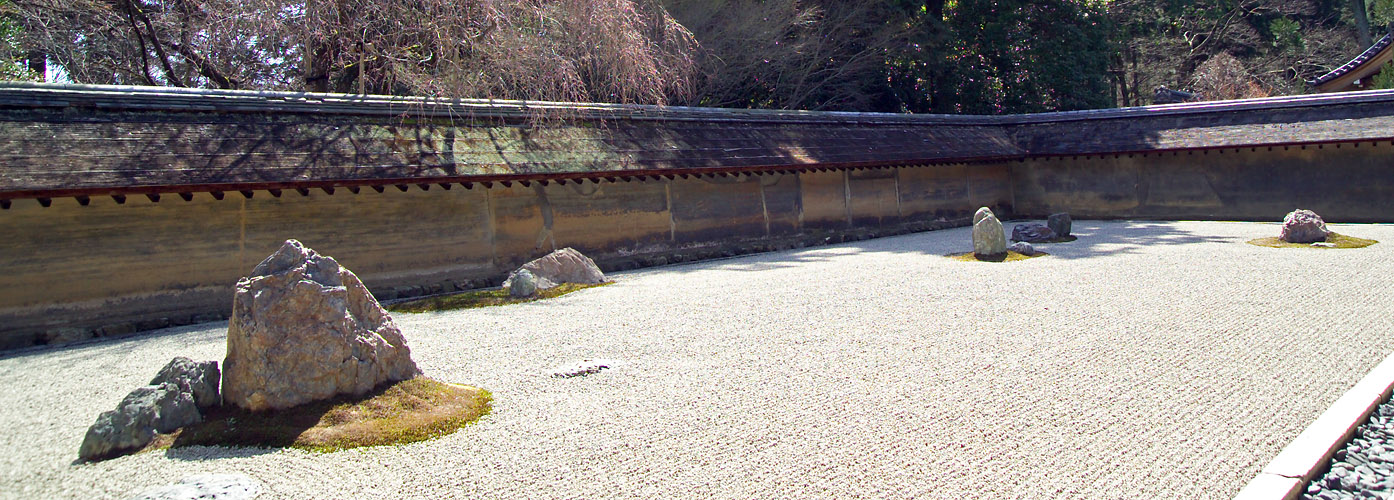
The karesansui garden at Ryoan-ji is one of Kyoto's most famous sights.

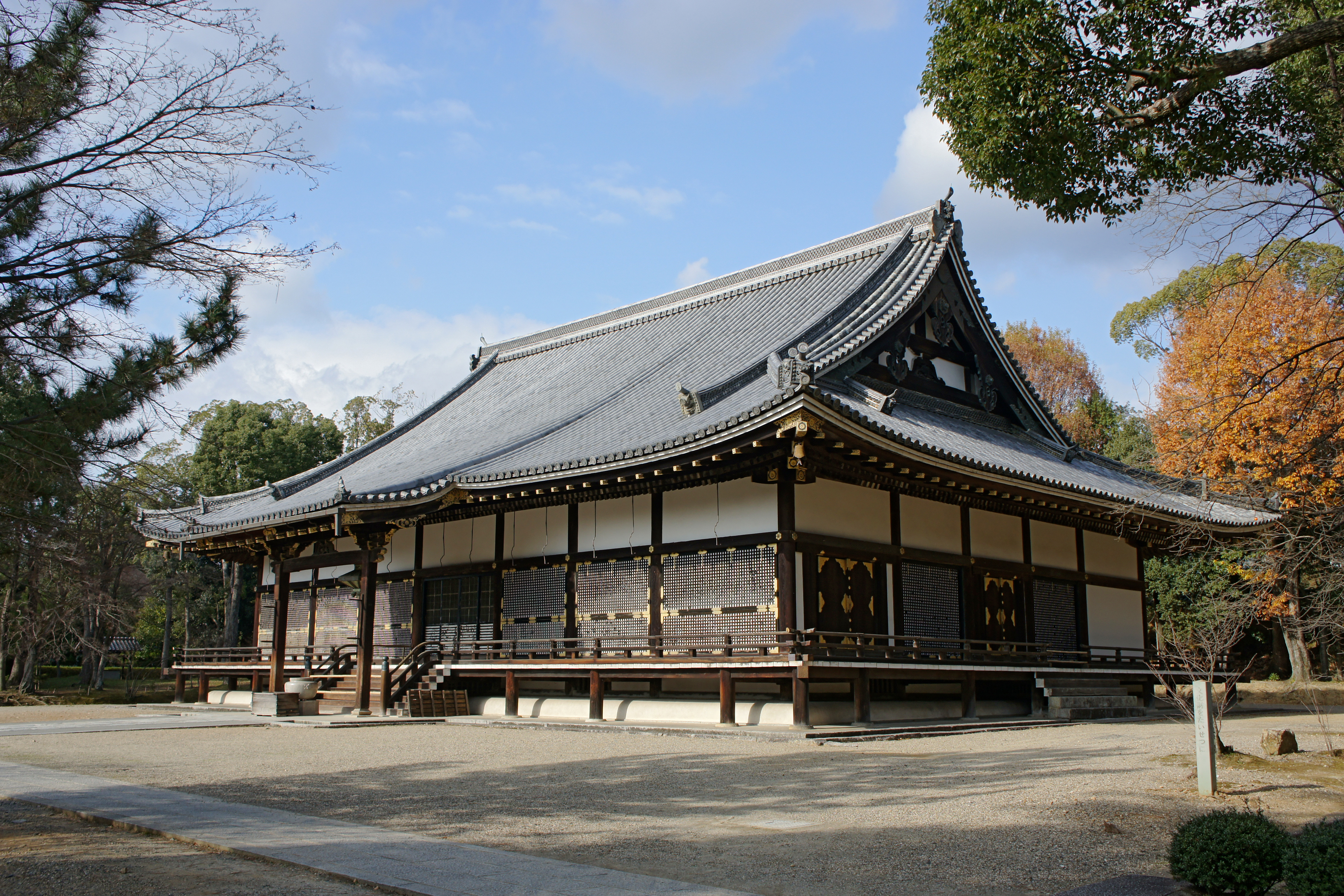
Ninna-ji Temple

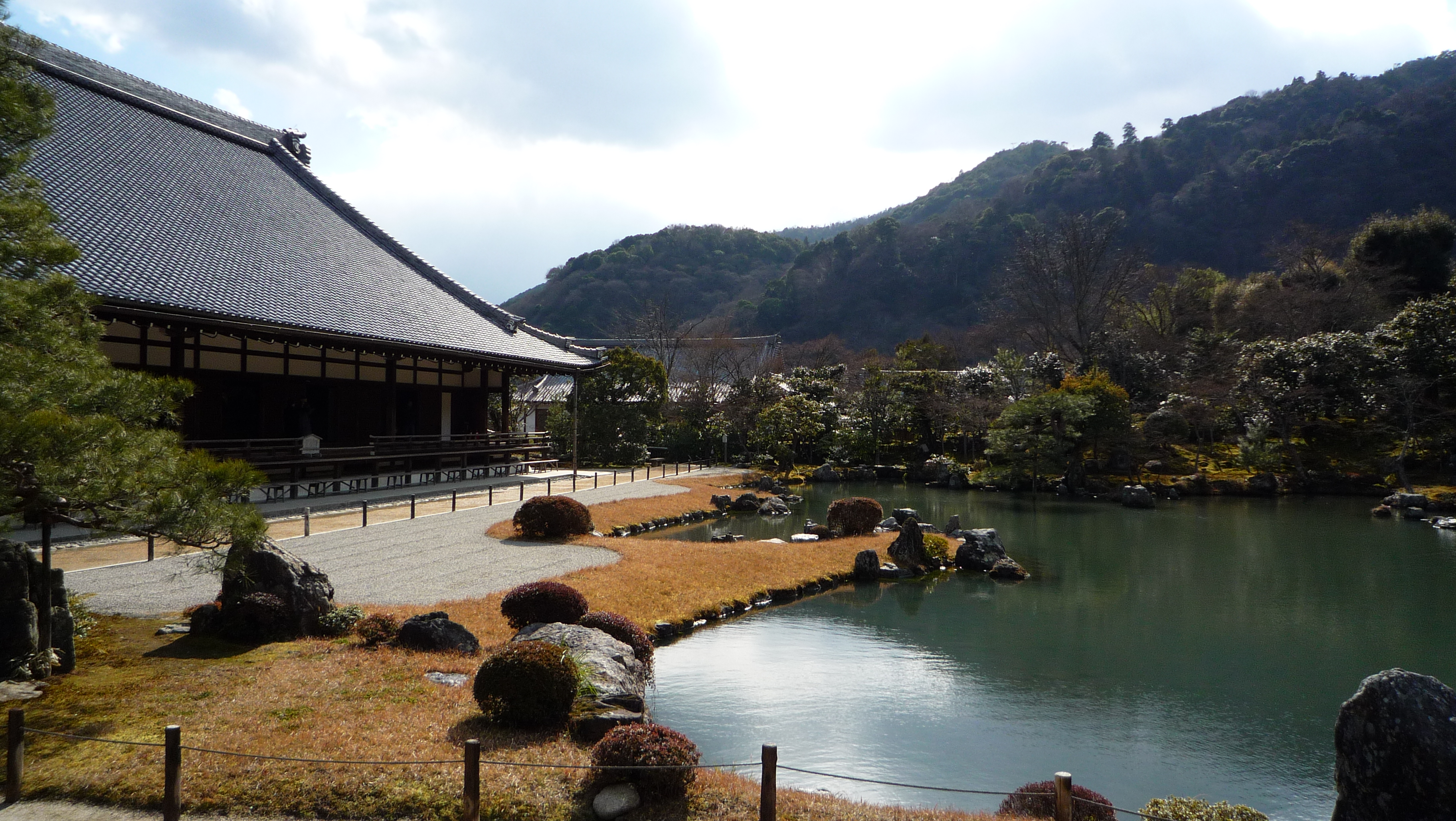
Tenryū-ji Temple

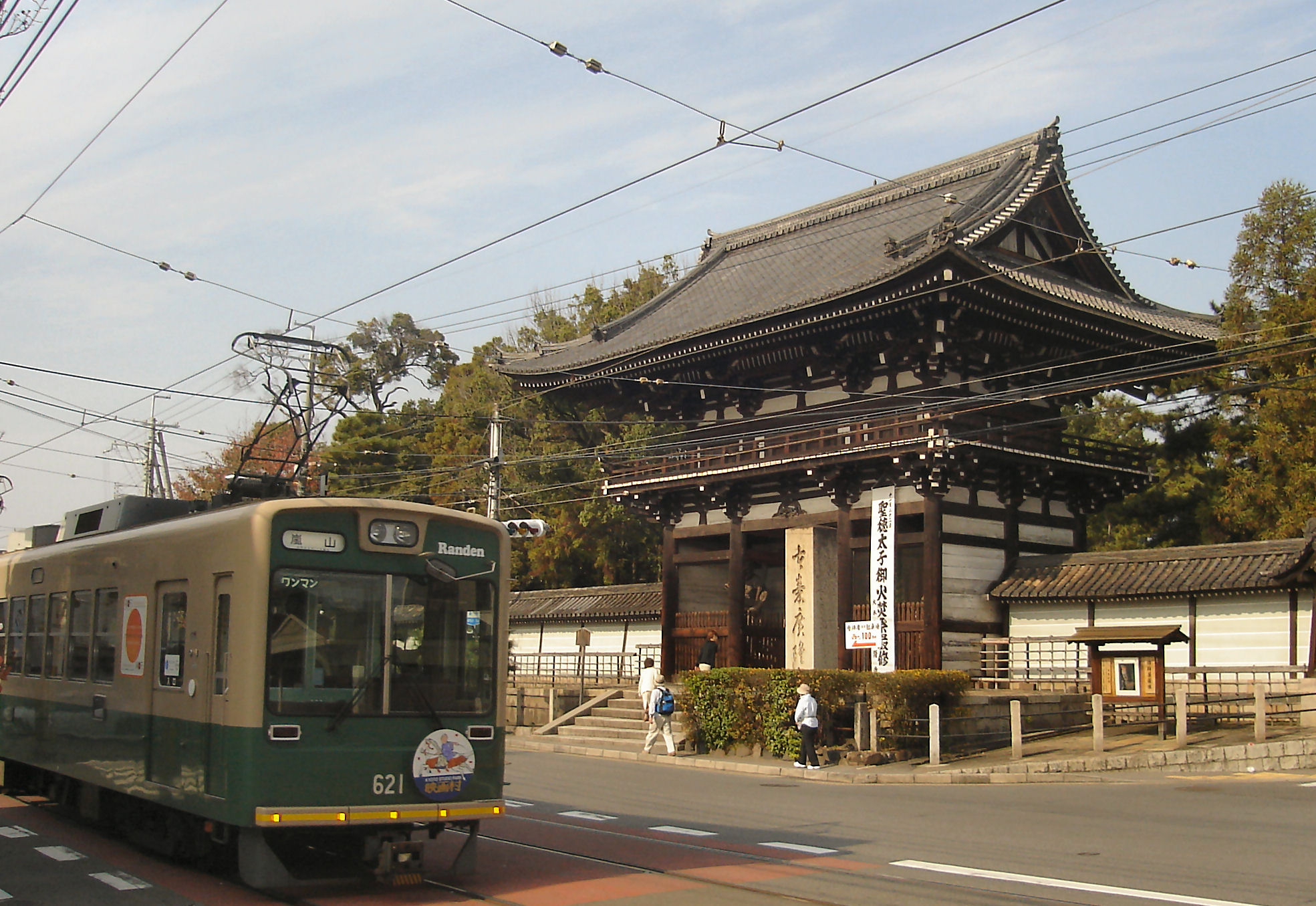
Rou Gate in Kōryū-ji Temple, and Randen Street-car

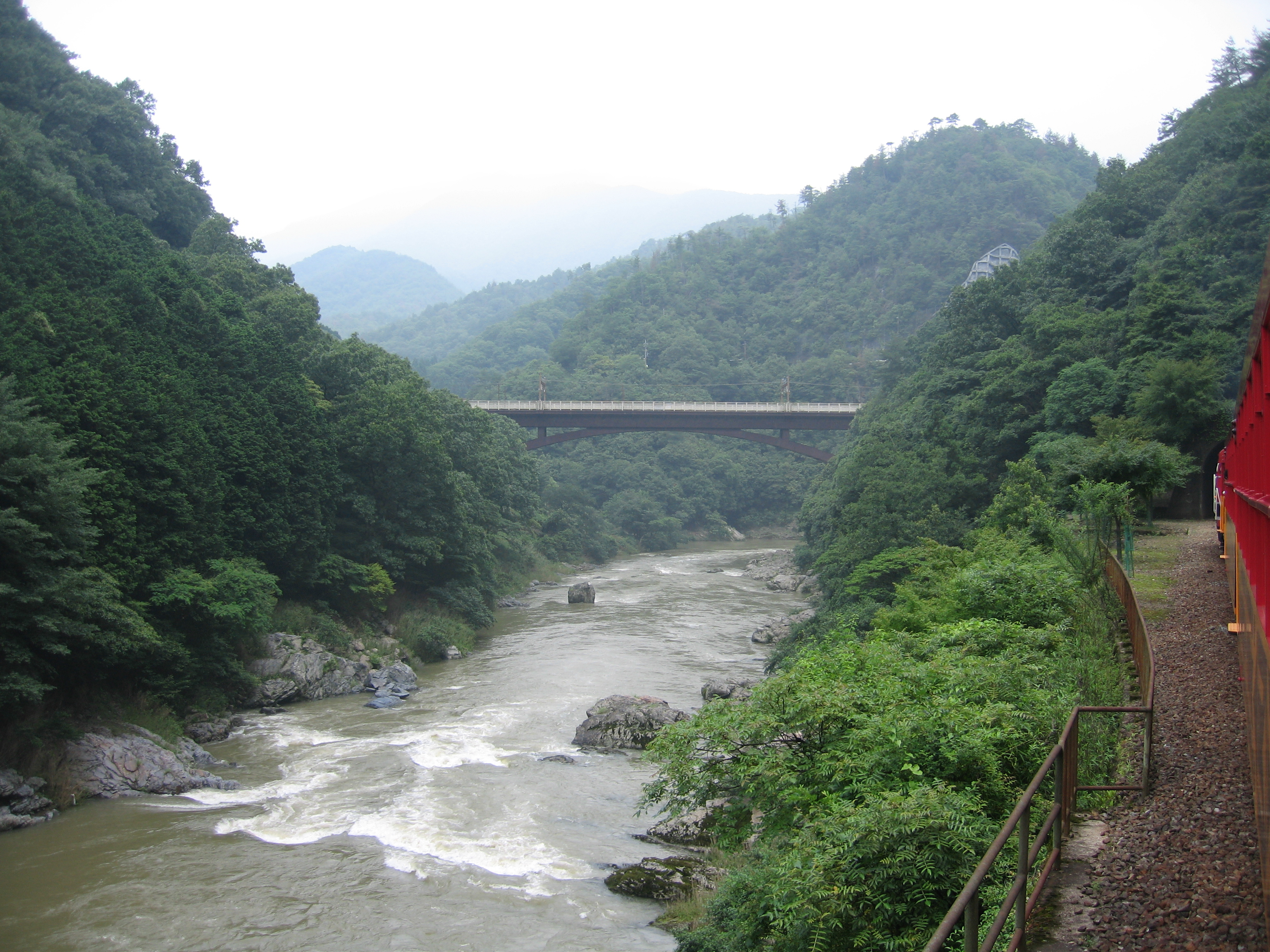
Hozu River and Gorge

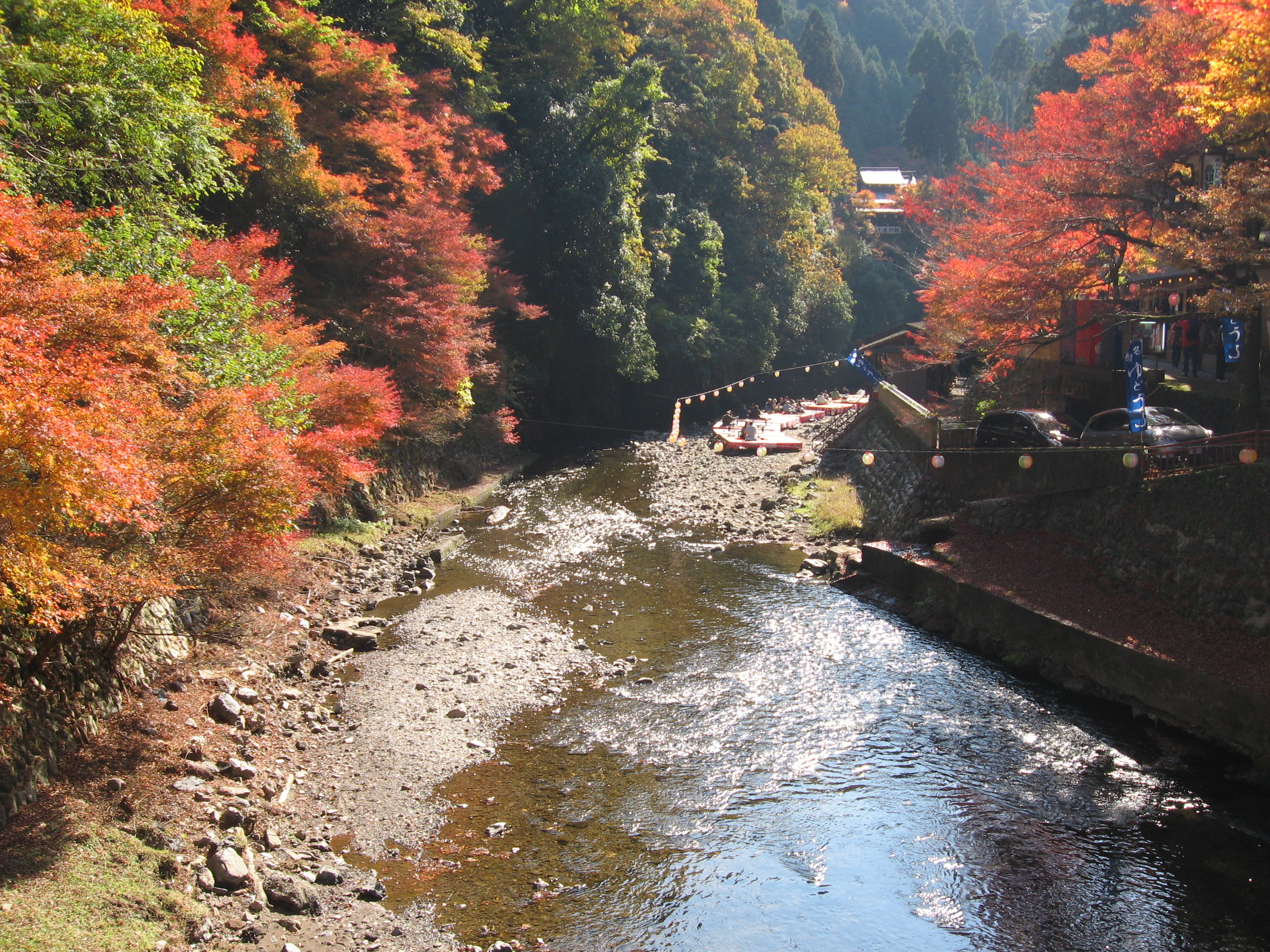
Kiyotaki river in Takao area
